= China national football team results (1970–1989) =

This article presents the results of the China PR national football team's matches spanning from 1970 to 1989.

Key
Win
Draw
Defeat

== 1971 ==
Date	Venue	Opponents	Score	Competition	Scorers
21 May	Beijing, China	Cuba	1–0	Friendly	
9 December	Dar es Salaam, Tanzania	Tanzania	1–1	Friendly	
12 December	Tanga, Tanzania	Tanzania	4–3	Friendly	

== 1972 ==
Date	Venue	Opponents	Score	Competition	Scorers
1 January	Lusaka, Zambia	Zambia	3–3	Friendly	
18 January	Mogadiscio, Somalia	Somalia	3–1	Friendly	
20 January	Aden, South Yemen	South Yemen	4–2^{1}	Friendly	
3 September	Colombo, Sri Lanka	Sri Lanka	3–2	Friendly	
12 September	Colombo, Sri Lanka	Sri Lanka	1–0	Friendly	
13 October	Beijing, China	Nepal	6–2	Friendly	
24 November	Conakry, Guinea	Guinea	1–1	Friendly	
29 November	Dakar, Senegal	Senegal	0–0	Friendly	
1: Non FIFA 'A' international match

== 1973 ==
Date	Venue	Opponents	Score	Competition	Scorers
10 June	Beijing, China	Pakistan	7–4	Friendly	
17 June	Beijing, China	Somalia	7–4	Friendly	
3 August	Beijing, China	Guinea	5–2	Friendly	Li Zhouzhe (2), Wang Jilian (2), Rong Zhixing
8 November	Tirana, Albania	Albania	1–1	Friendly	

== 1974 ==
Date	Venue	Opponents	Score	Competition	Scorers
5 May	Beijing, China	Sierra Leone	4–1	Friendly	
7 July	Beijing, China	Togo	4–2^{1}	Friendly	
10 July	Beijing, China	South Yemen	6–5^{1}	Friendly	Wang Houjun (2), Wang Jilian, Liu Qingquan
10 July	Beijing, China	North Korea	6–5^{1}	Friendly	Yang Limin 4', Yong Zhixing 21'
7 August	Beijing, China	Sudan	2–2	Friendly	
11 August	Beijing, China	Senegal	5–2	Friendly	
2 September	Tehran, Iran	North Korea	0–2^{1}	1974 Asian Games	
4 September	Tehran, Iran	Iraq	0–1^{1}	1974 Asian Games	
6 September	Tehran, Iran	India	7–1^{1}	1974 Asian Games	Li Guoning 19' (pen.), Wang Jilian 30', 31', Liu Qingquan 46', Li Guoning 56', Lin Xinjiang 76', Chi Shangbin 79'
1 November	Singapore	Singapore XI	7–2^{1}	Friendly	Chi Shangbin 8', 47', Wang Jilian 15', 27', Lin Xinjiang 22', Yung Zhixing 39', Liu Qingquan 78'
3 November	Singapore	Singapore	1–1^{1}	Friendly	Li Zhouzhe 7'
13 November	Bangkok, Thailand	(Thailand) Bangkok XI	3–2^{1}	Friendly	Li Zhouzhe 28', Chi Shangbin 32', 68'
15 November	Bangkok, Thailand	Thailand	3–2^{1}	Friendly	Yung Zhixing 50', Li Zhouzhe 59'
18 November	Manila, Philippines	(Philippines) Manila XI	6–1^{1}	Friendly	Wang Jilian (2), Rong Zhixing (2), Yang Limin, Lin Xinjiang
20 November	Manila, Philippines	Philippines	2–0^{1}	Friendly	Liu Qingquan 6', Wang Hangqin 8'
23 November	Manila, Philippines	Philippines XI	2–0^{1}	Friendly	Chi Shangbin 45' (?)
26 November	Government Stadium, Hong Kong	Hong Kong	5–2^{1}	Friendly	Qi Wusheng 13', Chi Shangbin 23', Li Yingfa 38', Rong Zhixing 75', Li Guoning 80'
27 December	Hanoi, North Vietnam	North Vietnam	3–3^{1}	Friendly	
29 December	Hanoi, North Vietnam	(North Vietnam) Quân Khu Việt Bắc	3–0^{1}	Friendly	
1: Non FIFA 'A' international match

== 1975 ==
Date	Venue	Opponents	Score	Competition	Scorers
24 March	Beijing, China	Panama	1–1	Friendly	
2 May	Beijing, China	Singapore	1–0^{1}	Friendly	
25 May	Shanghai, China	Lebanon	2–0^{1}	Friendly	
15 June	Hong Kong	North Korea	1–0	1976 AFC Asian Cup qualification	Li Guoning
19 June	Hong Kong	Brunei	10–1	1976 AFC Asian Cup qualification	
21 June	Hong Kong	Hong Kong	1–0	1976 AFC Asian Cup qualification	Rong Zhixing
23 June	Hong Kong	Japan	2–1	1976 AFC Asian Cup qualification	
26 June	Hong Kong	North Korea	0–2	1976 AFC Asian Cup qualification	
3 July	Beijing, China	Thailand	2–2	Friendly	
20 July	Auckland, New Zealand	New Zealand	1–2	Friendly	
23 July	Wellington, New Zealand	New Zealand	2–2	Friendly	
26 July	Christchurch, New Zealand	New Zealand	0–2	Friendly	
28 July	Nadi, Fiji	Fiji	4–1	Friendly	
6 August	Melbourne, Australia	Australia	0–1^{1}	Friendly	
14 August	Beijing, China	Kuwait	3–3	Friendly	
19 October	Beijing, China	New Zealand	2–1	Friendly	
1: Non FIFA 'A' international match

== 1976 ==
Date	Venue	Opponents	Score	Competition	Scorers
6 May	Beijing, China	Malaysia	2–0	Friendly	
5 June	Tabriz, Iran	Malaysia	1–1	1976 AFC Asian Cup	Wang Jilian
7 June	Tabriz, Iran	Kuwait	0–1	1976 AFC Asian Cup	
10 June	Tehran, Iran	Iran	0–2AET	1976 AFC Asian Cup	
13 June	Tehran, Iran	Iraq	1–0	1976 AFC Asian Cup	He Jia

== 1977 ==
Date	Venue	Opponents	Score	Competition	Scorers
17 June	Beijing, China	Zaire	3–2	Friendly	Chi Shangbin, Wang Changtai, Rong Zhixing
25 June	Beijing, China	Morocco	3–2AET	Friendly	
27 June	Beijing, China	Hong Kong	1–2	Friendly	Rong Zhixing
14 September	Beijing, China	Thailand	5–2^{1}	Friendly	
6 October	Washington D.C., United States	United States	1–1	Friendly	He Jia
10 October	Atlanta, United States	United States	0–1	Friendly	
16 October	San Francisco, United States	United States	1–2	Friendly	
23 October	Kingston, Jamaica	Jamaica	1–0	Friendly	
31 October	Kingston, Jamaica	Jamaica	3–0	Friendly	
1: Non FIFA 'A' international match

== 1978 ==
Date	Venue	Opponents	Score	Competition	Scorers
31 March	Caracas, Venezuela	Venezuela	1–0	Friendly	
9 April	Medellín, Colombia	Colombia	0–1^{1}	Friendly	
12 April	Bogotá, Colombia	Colombia	2–2^{1}	Friendly	
22 April	Lima, Peru	Peru	1–2	Friendly	Chi Shangbin
5 December	Bangkok, Thailand	Saudi Arabia	1–0	1978 Asian Games	
7 December	Bangkok, Thailand	Iraq	0–2	1978 Asian Games	
9 December	Bangkok, Thailand	Qatar	3–0	1978 Asian Games	
12 December	Bangkok, Thailand	South Korea	0–1	1978 Asian Games	
14 December	Bangkok, Thailand	Malaysia	7–1	1978 Asian Games	
16 December	Bangkok, Thailand	Thailand	4–1	1978 Asian Games	
19 December	Bangkok, Thailand	Iraq	1–0	1978 Asian Games	Li Fubao
25 December	Manila, Philippines	Philippines	3–0	1980 AFC Asian Cup qualification	
27 December	Manila, Philippines	Macau	2–1	1980 AFC Asian Cup qualification	
29 December	Manila, Philippines	South Korea	0–1	1980 AFC Asian Cup qualification	
1: Non FIFA 'A' international match

== 1980 ==
Date	Venue	Opponents	Score	Competition	Scorers
24 February	Singapore	India	1–0^{1}	1980 Summer Olympics qualification	Huang Xiangdong
27 February	Singapore	Iran	2–2^{1}	1980 Summer Olympics qualification	Li Fubao, Chi Shangbin
2 March	Singapore	North Korea	1–1^{1}	1980 Summer Olympics qualification	Own Goal
6 March	Singapore	Sri Lanka	7–0^{1}	1980 Summer Olympics qualification	Shen Xiangfu(2), Rong Zhixing(2), Chi Shangbin, Gu Guangming, Zuo Shusheng
8 March	Singapore	Singapore	0–1^{1}	1980 Summer Olympics qualification	
16 March	Kuala Lumpur, Malaysia	Malaysia	1–3	Friendly	Li Fubao
12 June	Guangzhou, China	Japan	1–0	Friendly	Li Jinchun
14 June	Guangzhou, China	Hong Kong	7–0	Friendly	Zuo Shusheng(3), Xu Yonglai(2), Huang Xiangdong(2)
18 September	Kuwait City, Kuwait	North Korea	1–2	1980 AFC Asian Cup	Li Fubao
20 September	Kuwait City, Kuwait	Iran	2–2	1980 AFC Asian Cup	Chen Jingang, Xu Yonglai
23 September	Kuwait City, Kuwait	Syria	0–1	1980 AFC Asian Cup	
25 September	Kuwait City, Kuwait	Bangladesh	6–0	1980 AFC Asian Cup	Shen Xiangfu(3), Xu Yonglai(3)
21 December	Hong Kong	Hong Kong	1–0	1982 FIFA World Cup qualification	Chen Jingang
24 December	Hong Kong	Macau	3–0	1982 FIFA World Cup qualification	Gu Guangming, Zuo Shusheng, Rong Zhixing
26 December	Hong Kong	Japan	1–0	1982 FIFA World Cup qualification	Rong Zhixing
31 December	Hong Kong	Hong Kong	0–0AET; 5–4PSO	1982 FIFA World Cup qualification	
1: Non FIFA 'A' international match

== 1981 ==
Date	Venue	Opponents	Score	Competition	Scorers
4 January	Hong Kong	North Korea	4–2AET	1982 FIFA World Cup qualification	Huang Xiangdong(2), Chen Xirong, Gu Guangming
2 June	Saitama, Japan	Japan	0–0	Friendly	
24 September	Beijing, China	New Zealand	0–0	1982 FIFA World Cup qualification	
3 October	Auckland, New Zealand	New Zealand	0–1	1982 FIFA World Cup qualification	
18 October	Beijing, China	Kuwait	3–0	1982 FIFA World Cup qualification	Rong Zhixing, Gu Guangming, Shen Xiangfu
12 November	Kuala Lumpur, Malaysia	Saudi Arabia	4–2	1982 FIFA World Cup qualification	Zuo Shusheng, Chen Jingang, Gu Guangming, Huang Xiangdong
19 November	Kuala Lumpur, Malaysia	Saudi Arabia	2–0	1982 FIFA World Cup qualification	Huang Xiangdong, Cai Jinbiao
30 November	Kuwait City, Kuwait	Kuwait	0–1	1982 FIFA World Cup qualification	

== 1982 ==
Date	Venue	Opponents	Score	Competition	Scorers
10 January	Singapore	New Zealand	1–2	1982 FIFA World Cup qualification	Huang Xiangdong
16 February	Calcutta, India	India	1–1	Nehru Cup 1982	Zuo Shusheng
22 February	Calcutta, India	Uruguay	0–0	Nehru Cup 1982	
1 March	Calcutta, India	South Korea	1–1	Nehru Cup 1982	Shen Xiangfu
4 March	Calcutta, India	Uruguay	0–2	Nehru Cup 1982	
6 June	Vaduz, Liechtenstein	Liechtenstein	0–2	Friendly	
21 July	Beijing, China	Hong Kong	2–0	Friendly	Zhao Dayu, Shen Xiangfu
23 July	Beijing, China	Morocco	3–3	Friendly	Xu Shugang, Chen Jingang, Zhao Dayu
20 November	New Delhi, India	Malaysia	1–0	1982 Asian Games	Liu Chengde
22 November	New Delhi, India	Bangladesh	1–0	1982 Asian Games	Huang Xiangdong
24 November	New Delhi, India	India	2–2	1982 Asian Games	Shen Xiangfu, Zuo Shusheng
27 November	New Delhi, India	North Korea	0–1	1982 Asian Games	

== 1983 ==
Date	Venue	Opponents	Score	Competition	Scorers
20 July	Beijing, China	Thailand	2–1	Friendly	Liu Haiguang, Zuo Shusheng
1 November	Bangkok, Thailand	Hong Kong	4–0^{1}	1984 Summer Olympics qualification	Zuo Shusheng(2), Liu Haiguang, Gu Guangming
3 November	Bangkok, Thailand	South Korea	3–3^{1}	1984 Summer Olympics qualification	Liu Haiguang(2), Jia Xiuquan
5 November	Bangkok, Thailand	Thailand	0–0^{1}	1984 Summer Olympics qualification	
8 November	Bangkok, Thailand	South Korea	0–0^{1}	1984 Summer Olympics qualification	
10 November	Bangkok, Thailand	Thailand	0–1^{1}	1984 Summer Olympics qualification	
12 November	Bangkok, Thailand	Hong Kong	3–1^{1}	1984 Summer Olympics qualification	Jia Xiuquan, Li Huajun, Liu Haiguang
4 December	Singapore	Australia	2–1	Merlion Cup 1983	Liu Haiguang, Lin Lefeng
14 December	Singapore	Singapore	0–1^{1}	Merlion Cup 1983	
1: Non FIFA 'A' international match

== 1984 ==
Date	Venue	Opponents	Score	Competition	Scorers
13 January	Calcutta, India	Hungary	1–1^{1}	Nehru Cup 1984	Zuo Shusheng
15 January	Calcutta, India	Poland	0–1	Nehru Cup 1984	
18 January	Calcutta, India	Romania	2–1^{1}	Nehru Cup 1984	Li Hui, Lü Hongxiang
20 January	Calcutta, India	Argentina	1–0	Nehru Cup 1984	Zhao Dayu
25 January	Calcutta, India	India	3–0	Nehru Cup 1984	Li Huayun(2), Jia Xiuquan
27 January	Calcutta, India	Poland	0–1	Nehru Cup 1984	
12 April	Nairobi, Kenya	Kenya	0–1	Friendly	
31 May	Ōmiya, Japan	Japan	0–1^{1}	Friendly	
3 June	Sapporo, Japan	Republic of Ireland	0–1	Friendly	
21 June	Beijing, China	India	2–0	Friendly	Zuo Shusheng, Li Hui
4 July	Beijing, China	Iran	1–0^{1}	Friendly	Zhu Bo
29 July	Iaşi, Romania	Romania	2–4	Friendly	Liu Haiguang, Zhao Dayu
31 July	Buzău, Romania	Romania	0–1	Friendly	
12 September	Guangzhou, China	Afghanistan	6–0	1984 AFC Asian Cup qualification	Li Hui(2), Zhao Dayu, Li Huayun, Zuo Shusheng, Yang Zhaohui
15 September	Guangzhou, China	Jordan	6–0	1984 AFC Asian Cup qualification	Zhao Dayu(2), Li Huayun, Gu Guangming, Li Hui, Yang Zhaohui
17 September	Guangzhou, China	Hong Kong	2–0	1984 AFC Asian Cup qualification	Zhao Dayu(2)
20 September	Guangzhou, China	Qatar	1–0	1984 AFC Asian Cup qualification	Zhao Dayu
3 November	Beijing, China	Australia	3–2	Friendly	Zhao Dayu, Lin Qiang, Zuo Shusheng
3 December	Singapore	Iran	0–2	1984 AFC Asian Cup	
5 December	Singapore	Singapore	2–0	1984 AFC Asian Cup	Jia Xiuquan, Zhao Dayu
9 December	Singapore	India	3–0	1984 AFC Asian Cup	Lin Lefeng, Gu Guangming, Jia Xiuquan
11 December	Singapore	United Arab Emirates	5–0	1984 AFC Asian Cup	Yang Zhaohui, Jia Xiuquan, Zuo Shusheng, Zhao Dayu, Gu Guangming
14 December	Singapore	Kuwait	1–0AET	1984 AFC Asian Cup	Li Huayun
16 December	Singapore	Saudi Arabia	0–2	1984 AFC Asian Cup	
1: Non FIFA 'A' international match

== 1985 ==
Date	Venue	Opponents	Score	Competition	Scorers
21 January	Kochi, India	Soviet Union	2–3^{1}	Nehru Cup 1985	Mai Chao, Ma Lin
24 January	Kochi, India	Iran	0–4^{1}	Nehru Cup 1985	
29 January	Kochi, India	Yugoslavia	1–1^{1}	Nehru Cup 1985	Wei Kexing
17 February	Hong Kong	Hong Kong	0–0	1986 FIFA World Cup qualification	
20 February	Macau	Macau	4–0	1986 FIFA World Cup qualification	Gu Guangming, Lin Lefeng, Zuo Shusheng, Own Goal
26 February	Macau	Brunei	8–0	1986 FIFA World Cup qualification	Zhao Dayu(3), Zuo Shusheng(2), Liu Haiguang(2), Li Hui
1 March	Hong Kong	Brunei	4–0	1986 FIFA World Cup qualification	Zhao Dayu(2), Liu Haiguang(2)
12 May	Beijing, China	Macau	6–0	1986 FIFA World Cup qualification	Yang Chaohui(2), Jia Xiuquan, Li Hui, Zhao Dayu, Wang Huiliang
19 May	Beijing, China	Hong Kong	1–2	1986 FIFA World Cup qualification	Li Hui
16 September	Lae, Papua New Guinea	Papua New Guinea	4–1	Friendly	Liu Haiguang(2), Ma Lin, Wu Qunli
19 September	Port Moresby, Papua New Guinea	Papua New Guinea	1–1	Friendly	Liu Haiguang
21 September	Canberra, Australia	Australia	0–2^{1}	Friendly	
24 September	Sydney, Australia	Australia	1–1^{1}	Friendly	Ma Lin
27 September	Brisbane, Australia	Australia	0–3	Friendly	
1: Non FIFA 'A' international match

== 1986 ==
Date	Venue	Opponents	Score	Competition	Scorers
3 January	Doha, Qatar	Qatar	1–1^{1}	Friendly	Li Huajun
25 January	Trivandrum, India	India	0–0	Nehru Cup 1986	
28 January	Trivandrum, India	Peru	3–1	Nehru Cup 1986	Ma Lin(2), Chen Dong
11 May	Naples, Italy	Italy	0–2	Friendly	
28 May	Beijing, China	Iran	2–1	Friendly	Li Hui, Liu Haiguang
23 August	Singapore	North Korea	0–0	Merlion Cup 1986	
25 August	Singapore	Indonesia	3–0	Merlion Cup 1986	Ma Lin, Liu Haiguang, Mai Chao
28 August	Singapore	Malaysia	4–0	Merlion Cup 1986	Jia Xiuquan, Ma Lin, Liu Haiguang, Li Hui
30 August	Singapore	Canada	1–0	Merlion Cup 1986	Ma Lin
1 September	Singapore	Singapore	3–0	Merlion Cup 1986	Tang Yaodong, Mai Chao, Li Hui
3 September	Singapore	Singapore	2–1AET	Merlion Cup 1986	Liu Haiguang, Qin Guorong
6 September	Singapore	North Korea	2–1	Merlion Cup 1986	Ma Lin, Qin Guorong
20 September	Busan, Korea Republic	Bahrain	5–1	1986 Asian Games	Ma Lin(2), Liu Haiguang, Liu Zhongchang, Qin Guorong
22 September	Busan, Korea Republic	India	2–1	1986 Asian Games	Ma Lin(2)
28 September	Busan, Korea Republic	South Korea	2–4	1986 Asian Games	Li Hui(2)
1 October	Busan, Korea Republic	Kuwait	1–1AET; 5–6PSO	1986 Asian Games	Own Goal
1: Non FIFA 'A' international match

== 1987 ==
Date	Venue	Opponents	Score	Competition	Scorers
7 March	León, Mexico	Mexico	2–3	Friendly	Jia Xiuquan, Tang Yaodong
10 April	Guangzhou, China	Philippines	9–0^{1}	1988 Summer Olympics qualification	Ma Lin(3), Li Hui(3), Jia Xiuquan, Liu Haiguang, Qin Guorong
13 April	Guangzhou, China	Philippines	10–0^{1}	1988 Summer Olympics qualification	Ma Lin(4), Jia Xiuquan(2), Mai Chao(2), Liu Haiguang, Own Goal
19 April	Hong Kong	Hong Kong	0–0^{1}	1988 Summer Olympics qualification	
20 May	Guangzhou, China	Hong Kong	1–0^{1}	1988 Summer Olympics qualification	Tang Yaodong
23 September	Guangzhou, China	Nepal	8–0^{1}	1988 Summer Olympics qualification	Wang Baoshan(3), Li Hui(3), Zhu Ping, Duan Ju
26 September	Guangzhou, China	Nepal	12–0^{1}	1988 Summer Olympics qualification	Wang Baoshan(3), Ma Lin(2), Duan Ju(2), Li Hui, Jia Xiuquan, Tang Yaodong, Mai Chao, Own Goal
4 October	Guangzhou, China	Japan	0–1^{1}	1988 Summer Olympics qualification	
11 October	Bangkok, Thailand	Thailand	1–0^{1}	1988 Summer Olympics qualification	Ma Lin
18 October	Guangzhou, China	Thailand	2–0^{1}	1988 Summer Olympics qualification	Liu Haiguang, Tang Yaodong
26 October	Tokyo, Japan	Japan	2–0^{1}	1988 Summer Olympics qualification	Liu Haiguang, Tang Yaodong
1: Non FIFA 'A' international match

== 1988 ==
Date	Venue	Opponents	Score	Competition	Scorers
5 February	Abu Dhabi, United Arab Emirates	South Yemen	0–0	1988 AFC Asian Cup qualification	
8 February	Abu Dhabi, United Arab Emirates	Bangladesh	4–0	1988 AFC Asian Cup qualification	Mai Chao(2), Liu Haiguang, Wu Qunli
10 February	Abu Dhabi, United Arab Emirates	United Arab Emirates	0–0	1988 AFC Asian Cup qualification	
14 February	Abu Dhabi, United Arab Emirates	Thailand	5–0	1988 AFC Asian Cup qualification	Mai Chao(2), Xie Yuxin, Jia Xiuquan, Liu Haiguang
16 February	Abu Dhabi, United Arab Emirates	India	1–0	1988 AFC Asian Cup qualification	Liu Haiguang
8 May	Hangzhou, China	North Korea	0–0^{1}	Friendly	
2 June	Nagoya, Japan	Japan	3–0	Friendly	Wang Baoshan, Gao Sheng, Ma Lin
17 September	Busan, Korea Republic	West Germany	0–3^{1}	1988 Summer Olympics	
19 September	Busan, Korea Republic	Sweden	0–2^{1}	1988 Summer Olympics	
21 September	Busan, Korea Republic	Tunisia	0–0^{1}	1988 Summer Olympics	
4 December	Doha, Qatar	Syria	3–0	1988 AFC Asian Cup	Xie Yuxin(2), Gao Sheng
6 December	Doha, Qatar	Bahrain	1–0	1988 AFC Asian Cup	Zhang Xiaowen
10 December	Doha, Qatar	Kuwait	2–2	1988 AFC Asian Cup	Ma Lin(2)
12 December	Doha, Qatar	Saudi Arabia	0–1	1988 AFC Asian Cup	
14 December	Doha, Qatar	South Korea	1–2AET	1988 AFC Asian Cup	Mai Chao
16 December	Doha, Qatar	Iran	0–0AET; 0–3PSO	1988 AFC Asian Cup	
1: Non FIFA 'A' international match

== 1989 ==
Date	Venue	Opponents	Score	Competition	Scorers
23 February	Guangzhou, China	Bangladesh	2–0	1990 FIFA World Cup qualification	Wang Baoshan, Mai Chao
28 February	Bangkok, Thailand	Thailand	3–0	1990 FIFA World Cup qualification	Ma Lin(2), Tang Yaodong
4 March	Dhaka, Bangladesh	Bangladesh	2–0	1990 FIFA World Cup qualification	Wang Baoshan, Ma Lin
10 May	Tokyo, Japan	Japan	2–2	Friendly	Own Goal, Zhang Xiaowen
13 May	Okayama, Japan	Japan	0–2	Friendly	
15 July	Shenyang, China	Iran	2–0	1990 FIFA World Cup qualification	Liu Haiguang, Zhang Xiaowen
22 July	Tehran, Iran	Iran	2–3	1990 FIFA World Cup qualification	Mai Chao, Ma Lin
29 July	Shenyang, China	Thailand	2–0	1990 FIFA World Cup qualification	Jia Xiuquan, Ma Lin
20 September	Kuwait City, Kuwait	Kuwait	0–2	Friendly	
12 October	Singapore	Saudi Arabia	2–1	1990 FIFA World Cup qualification	Mai Chao(2)
17 October	Singapore	United Arab Emirates	1–2	1990 FIFA World Cup qualification	Tang Yaodong
20 October	Singapore	South Korea	0–1	1990 FIFA World Cup qualification	
24 October	Singapore	North Korea	1–0	1990 FIFA World Cup qualification	Xie Yuxin
28 October	Singapore	Qatar	1–2	1990 FIFA World Cup qualification	Ma Lin
