= China at the AFC Asian Cup =

China PR has participated in the AFC Asian Cup since 1976.

== Overview ==
China's AFC Asian Cup record									Qualification record						
Year	Round	Position	Pld	W	D	L	GF	GA	Pld	W	D	L	GF	GA	Link
(Hong Kong) 1956	Did not enter								Did not enter						Link
(South Korea) 1960	Did not enter								Did not enter						Link
(Israel) 1964	Did not enter								Did not enter						Link
(Iran) 1968	Did not enter								Did not enter						Link
(Thailand) 1972	Did not enter								Did not enter						Link
(Iran) 1976	Third place	3rd	4	1	1	2	2	4	5	4	0	1	14	4	Link
(Kuwait) 1980	Group stage	7th	4	1	1	2	9	5	3	2	0	1	5	2	Link
(Singapore) 1984	Runners-up	2nd	6	4	0	2	11	4	4	4	0	0	15	0	Link
(Qatar) 1988	Fourth place	4th	6	2	2	2	7	5	5	2	3	0	10	1	Link
(Japan) 1992	Third place	3rd	5	1	3	1	6	6	3	3	0	0	7	0	Link
(United Arab Emirates) 1996	Quarter-finals	8th	4	1	0	3	6	7	3	3	0	0	16	1	Link
(Lebanon) 2000	Fourth place	4th	6	2	2	2	11	7	3	3	0	0	29	0	Link
(China) 2004	Runners-up	2nd	6	3	2	1	13	6	Qualified as hosts						Link
(Indonesia) (Malaysia) (Thailand) (Vietnam) 2007	Group stage	9th	3	1	1	1	7	6	6	3	2	1	7	3	Link
(Qatar) 2011	Group stage	9th	3	1	1	1	4	4	6	4	1	1	13	5	Link
(Australia) 2015	Quarter-finals	7th	4	3	0	1	5	4	6	2	2	2	5	6	Link
(United Arab Emirates) 2019	Quarter-finals	6th	5	3	0	2	7	7	8	5	2	1	27	1	Link
(Qatar) 2023	Group stage	18th	3	0	2	1	0	1	8	6	1	1	30	3	Link
(Saudi Arabia) 2027	Qualified								6	2	2	2	9	9	Link
Total	14/19	0 titles	59	23	15	21	88	66	66	43	13	10	187	35	Link

== 1976 ==
=== Group A ===
Team	Pld	W	D	L	GF	GA	GD	Pts
Kuwait	2	2	0	0	3	0	+3	4
China	2	0	1	1	1	2	−1	1
Malaysia	2	0	1	1	1	3	−2	1

5 June 1976

China	1–1	Malaysia
Wang Jilian 58'		Mokhtar 50'

Reza Pahlavi Stadium, Tabriz

7 June 1976

Kuwait	1–0	China
Kameel 1'

Reza Pahlavi Stadium, Tabriz

=== Knockout stage ===
Semi-finals

11 June 1976

Iran	2–0 (a.e.t.)	China
Khorshidi 100'; Roshan 119'

Aryamehr Stadium, Tehran
Attendance: 60,000
Referee: Asami (Japan)

Third place play-off

13 June 1976

Iraq	0–1	China
		He Jia 61'

Aryamehr Stadium, Tehran

== 1980 ==
=== Group A ===
Team	Pld	W	D	L	GF	GA	GD	Pts
Iran	4	2	2	0	12	4	+8	6
North Korea	4	3	0	1	9	7	+2	6
Syria	4	2	1	1	3	2	+1	5
China	4	1	1	2	9	5	+4	3
Bangladesh	4	0	0	4	2	17	−15	0

18 September 1980

North Korea	2–1	China
Kim Bok-man 20'		Li Fubao 7'

Sabah Al-Salem Stadium, Kuwait City

20 September 1980

China	2–2	Iran
Chen Jingang 74'; Xu Yonglai 89'		Alidousti 35'; Fariba 70'

Sabah Al-Salem Stadium, Kuwait City
Attendance: 10,000

23 September 1980

Syria	1–0	China
Keshek 86'

Sabah Al-Salem Stadium, Kuwait City

25 September 1980

China	6–0	Bangladesh
Shen Xiangfu; Xu Yonglai

Sabah Al-Salem Stadium, Kuwait City

== 1984 ==
=== Group B ===
Team	Pld	W	D	L	GF	GA	GD	Pts
China	4	3	0	1	10	2	+8	6
Iran	4	2	2	0	6	1	+5	6
United Arab Emirates	4	2	0	2	3	8	−5	4
Singapore	4	1	1	2	3	4	−1	3
India	4	0	1	3	0	7	−7	1

3 December 1984
19:00

Iran	2–0	China
Mohammadkhani 57'; Arabshahi 69'

National Stadium, Singapore
Attendance: 19,000
Referee: George Courtney (England)

5 December 1984
21:00

Singapore	0–2	China
		Jia Xiuquan 21'; Zhao Dayu 39'

National Stadium, Singapore
Attendance: 20,752
Referee: Ahmed Jassim (Bahrain)

9 December 1984
21:00

China	3–0	India
Lin Lefeng 19'; Gu Guangming 59'; Jia Xiuquan 79'

National Stadium, Singapore
Attendance: 8,256
Referee: Ahmed Jassim (Bahrain)

11 December 1984
19:00

China	5–0	United Arab Emirates
Yang Zhaohui 12'; Jia Xiuquan 20'; Zuo Shusheng 36'; Zhao Dayu 52'; Gu Guangming 67'

National Stadium, Singapore
Attendance: 5,000
Referee: Shizuo Takada (Japan)

=== Knockout stage ===
Semi-finals

14 December 1984
20:00

China	1–0 (a.e.t.)	Kuwait
Li Huayun 108'

National Stadium, Singapore
Attendance: 20,000
Referee: Augusto Lamo (Spain)

Final

16 December 1984
20:00

Saudi Arabia	2–0	China
Al-Nafisah 10'; Abdullah 46'

National Stadium, Singapore
Attendance: 26,000
Referee: Shizuo Takada (Japan)

== 1988 ==
=== Group B ===
Team	Pts	Pld	W	D	L	GF	GA	GD
Saudi Arabia	6	4	2	2	0	4	1	+3
China	5	4	2	1	1	6	3	+3
Syria	4	4	2	0	2	2	5	−3
Kuwait	3	4	0	3	1	2	3	−1
Bahrain	2	4	0	2	2	1	3	−2

4 December 1988
17:00

China	3–0	Syria
Gao Sheng 13'; Xie Yuxin 14', 19'	Report

Qatar SC Stadium, Doha
Referee: Mohamed Hansal (Algeria)

6 December 1988
17:00

Bahrain	0–1	China
	Report	Zhang Xiaowen 78'

Qatar SC Stadium, Doha
Referee: Syed Shahid Hakim (India)

10 December 1988
17:00

Kuwait	2–2	China
Adel Abbas 60' (pen.); Mansour Basha 62'	Report	Ma Lin 10', 87'

Al-Ahly Stadium, Doha
Referee: Erik Fredriksson (Sweden)

12 December 1988
15:00

China	0–1	Saudi Arabia
	Report	Al-Bishi 56'

Al-Ahly Stadium, Doha
Referee: Mohamed Hansal (Algeria)

=== Knockout stage ===
Semi-finals

14 December 1988
16:00

South Korea	2–1 (a.e.t.)	China
Lee Tae-Ho 93', 103'	Report	Mai Chao 100'

Qatar SC Stadium, Doha
Attendance: 1,000
Referee: Vincent Mauro (United States)

Third place play-off

17 December 1988
16:00

China	0–0	Iran
	Report
Penalties
Duan Ju (penalty missed); Wang Baoshan (penalty missed); Wu Wenbing (penalty missed)	0–3	(penalty scored) Moharrami; (penalty scored) Ansarifard; (penalty scored) Ghayeghran

Al-Ahly Stadium, Doha
Attendance: 2,000
Referee: Ahmad Bash (Jordan)

== 1992 ==
=== Group B ===
Team	Pts	Pld	W	D	L	GF	GA	GD
Saudi Arabia	5	3	1	2	0	6	2	+4
China	5	3	1	2	0	3	2	+1
Qatar	2	3	0	2	1	3	4	−1
Thailand	2	3	0	2	1	1	5	−4

29 October 1992
17:00

Saudi Arabia	1–1	China
Al-Thunayan 17'	Report	Li Bing 41'

Hiroshima Big Arch, Hiroshima
Attendance: 15,000
Referee: Shinichiro Obata (Japan)

31 October 1992
15:00

China	0–0	Thailand
	Report

Hiroshima Stadium, Hiroshima
Attendance: 5,000
Referee: Noh Byung-Il (Korea Republic)

2 November 1992
19:00

Qatar	1–2	China
Al-Sulaiti 20'	Report	Peng Weiguo 44', 58'

Bingo Sports Park, Onomichi
Attendance: 4,500
Referee: Badara Sène (Senegal)

=== Knockout stage ===
Semi-finals

6 November 1992
16:30

Japan	3–2	China
Fukuda 48'; Kitazawa 57'; Nakayama 84'	Report	Xie Yuxin 1'; Li Xiao 70'

Hiroshima Stadium, Hiroshima
Attendance: 15,000
Referee: Hossein Khoshkhan (Iran)

Third place play-off

8 November 1992
12:00

China	1–1	United Arab Emirates
Hao Haidong 15'	Report	Ismail 10'
Penalties
	4–3

Hiroshima Big Arch, Hiroshima
Attendance: 40,000
Referee: Neji Jouini (Tunisia)

== 1996 ==
=== Group C ===
Team	Pts	Pld	W	D	L	GF	GA	GD
Japan	9	3	3	0	0	7	1	+6
China	3	3	1	0	2	3	3	0
Syria	3	3	1	0	2	3	6	−3
Uzbekistan	3	3	1	0	2	3	6	−3

6 December 1996
19:00

China	0–2	Uzbekistan
	Report	Shkvyrin 78'; Shatskikh 90'

Tahnoun Bin Mohamed Stadium, Al Ain
Attendance: 3,000
Referee: Abdul Rahman Al-Zeid (Saudi Arabia)

9 December 1996
19:00

Syria	0–3	China
	Report	Ma Mingyu 35'; Gao Feng 49'; Li Bing 73'

Tahnoun Bin Mohamed Stadium, Al Ain
Attendance: 3,000
Referee: Kim Young-Joo (Korea Republic)

12 December 1996
16:45

Japan	1–0	China
Soma 90'	Report

Tahnoun Bin Mohamed Stadium, Al Ain
Attendance: 2,000
Referee: Abdul Rahman Al-Zeid (Saudi Arabia)

=== Knockout stage ===
Quarter-finals

16 December 1996
19:30

Saudi Arabia	4–3	China
Al-Thunayan 31', 65'; Al-Jaber 34'; Al-Mehallel 43'	Report	Zhang Enhua 6', 89'; Peng Weiguo 16'

Sheikh Zayed Stadium, Abu Dhabi
Attendance: 5,000
Referee: Mohd Nazri Abdullah (Malaysia)

== 2000 ==
=== Group B ===
Team	Pts	Pld	W	D	L	GF	GA	GD
China	5	3	1	2	0	6	2	+4
Kuwait	5	3	1	2	0	1	0	+1
South Korea	4	3	1	1	1	5	3	+2
Indonesia	1	3	0	1	2	0	7	−7

13 October 2000
17:00

South Korea	2–2	China
Lee Young-Pyo 30'; Noh Jung-Yoon 58'	Report	Su Maozhen 36'; Fan Zhiyi 66' (pen.)

International Olympic Stadium, Tripoli
Attendance: 1,000
Referee: Omer Al-Mehannah (Saudi Arabia)

16 October 2000
17:00

China	4–0	Indonesia
Li Ming 2'; Shen Si 7' (pen.); Yang Chen 10'; Qi Hong 90'	Report

International Olympic Stadium, Tripoli
Attendance: 2,000
Referee: Nabil Ayad (Lebanon)

19 October 2000
19:30

China	0–0	Kuwait
	Report

International Olympic Stadium, Tripoli
Attendance: 5,000
Referee: Shamsul Maidin (Singapore)

=== Knockout stage ===
Quarter-finals

23 October 2000
19:45

China	3–1	Qatar
Li Ming 9'; Qi Hong 38'; Yang Chen 54'	Report	Al-Enazi 65'

Saida Municipal Stadium, Sidon
Attendance: 3,000
Referee: Mohd Nazri Abdullah (Malaysia)

Semi-finals

26 October 2000
19:45

China	2–3	Japan
Qi Hong 30'; Yang Chen 48'	Report	Fan Zhiyi 21' (o.g.); Nishizawa 53'; Myojin 61'

Sports City Stadium, Beirut
Attendance: 5,000
Referee: Shamsul Maidin (Singapore)

Third place play-off

29 October 2000
17:00

South Korea	1–0	China
Lee Dong-Gook 76'	Report

Sports City Stadium, Beirut
Attendance: 20,000
Referee: Nabil Ayad (Lebanon)

== 2004 ==
=== Group A ===
Team	Pts	Pld	W	D	L	GF	GA	GD
China	7	3	2	1	0	8	2	+6
Bahrain	5	3	1	2	0	6	4	+2
Indonesia	3	3	1	0	2	3	9	−6
Qatar	1	3	0	1	2	2	4	−2

17 July 2004
20:00

China	2–2	Bahrain
Zheng Zhi 58' (pen.); Li Jinyu 66'	Report	M. Hubail 41'; Ali 89'

Workers Stadium, Beijing
Attendance: 40,000
Referee: Subkhiddin Mohd Salleh (Malaysia)

21 July 2004
21:00

Indonesia	0–5	China
	Report	Shao Jiayi 25', 66'; Hao Haidong 40'; Li Ming 51'; Li Yi 80'

Workers Stadium, Beijing
Attendance: 48,000
Referee: Talaat Najm (Lebanon)

25 July 2004
19:00

China	1–0	Qatar
Xu Yunlong 77'	Report

Workers Stadium, Beijing
Attendance: 60,000
Referee: Masoud Moradi (Iran)

=== Knockout stage ===
Quarter-finals

30 July 2004
21:00

China	3–0	Iraq
Hao Haidong 8'; Zheng Zhi 81' (pen.), 90+2' (pen.)	Report

Workers Stadium, Beijing
Attendance: 60,000
Referee: Shamsul Maidin (Singapore)

Semi-finals

3 August 2004
21:00

China	1–1 (a.e.t.)	Iran
Shao Jiayi 18'	Report	Alavi 38'
Penalties
Zheng Zhi (penalty scored); Zhao Junzhe (penalty missed); Li Xiaopeng (penalty scored); Sun Xiang (penalty scored); Shao Jiayi (penalty scored)	4–3	(penalty scored) Daei; (penalty scored) Mahdavikia; (penalty scored) Nekounam; (penalty missed) Mobali; (penalty missed) Golmohammadi

Workers Stadium, Beijing
Attendance: 55,000
Referee: Talaat Najm (Lebanon)

Final

7 August 2004
20:00

China	1–3	Japan
Li Ming 31'	Report	Fukunishi 22'; Nakata 65'; Tamada 90+1'

Workers Stadium, Beijing
Attendance: 62,000
Referee: Saad Kamil Al-Fadhli (Kuwait)

== 2007 ==
=== Group C ===
Team	Pld	W	D	L	GF	GA	GD	Pts
Iran	3	2	1	0	6	3	+3	7
Uzbekistan	3	2	0	1	9	2	+7	6
China	3	1	1	1	7	6	+1	4
Malaysia	3	0	0	3	1	12	−11	0

10 July 2007
20:30 UTC+8

Malaysia	1–5	China
Mahayuddin 74'	Report	Han Peng 15', 55'; Shao Jiayi 36'; Wang Dong 51', 90+3'

Bukit Jalil Stadium, Kuala Lumpur
Attendance: 21,155
Referee: Muhsen Basma (Syria)

15 July 2007
18:15 UTC+8

China	2–2	Iran
Shao Jiayi 7'; Mao Jianqing 33'	Report	Zandi 45+1'; Nekounam 74'

Bukit Jalil Stadium, Kuala Lumpur
Attendance: 5,938
Referee: Khalil Al-Ghamdi (Saudi Arabia)

18 July 2007
20:30 UTC+8

Uzbekistan	3–0	China
Shatskikh 72'; Kapadze 86'; Geynrikh 90+4'	Report

Shah Alam Stadium, Shah Alam
Attendance: 2,200
Referee: Saad Kamil Al-Fadhli (Kuwait)

== 2011 ==
=== Group A ===
Team	Pld	W	D	L	GF	GA	GD	Pts
Uzbekistan	3	2	1	0	6	3	+3	7
Qatar	3	2	0	1	5	2	+3	6
China	3	1	1	1	4	4	0	4
Kuwait	3	0	0	3	1	7	−6	0

8 January 2011
Kuwait	0–2	China
12 January 2011
China	0–2	Qatar
16 January 2011
China	2–2	Uzbekistan

== 2015 ==
=== Group B ===
Pos	Team	Pld	W	D	L	GF	GA	GD	Pts	Qualification
1	China	3	3	0	0	5	2	+3	9	Advance to knockout stage
2	Uzbekistan	3	2	0	1	5	3	+2	6	Advance to knockout stage
3	Saudi Arabia	3	1	0	2	5	5	0	3	
4	North Korea	3	0	0	3	2	7	−5	0	

Source: Asian Cup Australia 2015
Rules for classification: Tiebreakers

10 January 2015
Saudi Arabia	0–1	China	Brisbane Stadium, Brisbane
14 January 2015
China	2–1	Uzbekistan	Brisbane Stadium, Brisbane
18 January 2015
China	2–1	North Korea	Canberra Stadium, Canberra

=== Knockout stage ===
Quarter-finals

22 January 2015
20:30 AEST (UTC+10)

China	0–2	Australia
	Report	Cahill 48', 65'

Brisbane Stadium, Brisbane
Attendance: 46,067
Referee: Kim Jong-hyeok (South Korea)

== 2019 ==
=== Group C ===
Pos	Team	Pld	W	D	L	GF	GA	GD	Pts	Qualification
1	South Korea	3	3	0	0	4	0	+4	9	Advance to knockout stage
2	China	3	2	0	1	5	3	+2	6	Advance to knockout stage
3	Kyrgyzstan	3	1	0	2	4	4	0	3	Advance to knockout stage
4	Philippines	3	0	0	3	1	7	−6	0	

Source: AFC
7 January 2019
15:00

China	2–1	Kyrgyzstan
Matyash 50' (o.g.); Yu Dabao 78'	Report	Israilov 42'

Khalifa bin Zayed Stadium, Al Ain
Attendance: 1,839
Referee: Mohammed Abdulla Hassan Mohamed (United Arab Emirates)

11 January 2019
17:30

Philippines	0–3	China
	Report	Wu Lei 40', 66'; Yu Dabao 80'

Mohammed bin Zayed Stadium, Abu Dhabi
Attendance: 16,013
Referee: Hiroyuki Kimura (Japan)

16 January 2019
17:30

South Korea	2–0	China
Hwang Ui-jo 14' (pen.); Kim Min-jae 51'	Report

Al Nahyan Stadium, Abu Dhabi
Attendance: 13,579
Referee: Abdulrahman Al-Jassim (Qatar)

=== Knockout stage ===
Round of 16

20 January 2019
18:00

Thailand	1–2	China
Supachai 31'	Report	Xiao Zhi 67'; Gao Lin 71' (pen.)

Hazza bin Zayed Stadium, Al Ain
Attendance: 8,026
Referee: Mohammed Abdulla Hassan Mohamed (United Arab Emirates)

Quarter-finals

24 January 2019
20:00

China	0–3	Iran
	Report	Taremi 18'; Azmoun 31'; Ansarifard 90+1'

Mohammed bin Zayed Stadium, Abu Dhabi
Attendance: 19,578
Referee: Abdulrahman Al-Jassim (Qatar)

== 2023 ==
=== Group A ===
Pos	Team	Pld	W	D	L	GF	GA	GD	Pts	Qualification
1	Qatar (H)	3	3	0	0	5	0	+5	9	Advance to knockout stage
2	Tajikistan	3	1	1	1	2	2	0	4	Advance to knockout stage
3	China	3	0	2	1	0	1	−1	2	
4	Lebanon	3	0	1	2	1	5	−4	1	

Source: AFC
(H) Hosts
13 January 2024
17:30

China	0–0	Tajikistan
	Report

Abdullah bin Khalifa Stadium, Doha
Attendance: 4,001
Referee: Mohammed Al-Hoaish (Saudi Arabia)

17 January 2024
14:30

Lebanon	0–0	China
	Report

Al Thumama Stadium, Doha
Attendance: 14,137
Referee: Ko Hyung-jin (South Korea)

22 January 2024
18:00

Qatar	1–0	China
Al-Haydos 66'	Report

Khalifa International Stadium, Al Rayyan
Attendance: 42,104
Referee: Abdullah Jamali (Kuwait)

Ranking of third-placed teams

Pos	Grp	Team	Pld	W	D	L	GF	GA	GD	Pts	Qualification
1	E	Jordan	3	1	1	1	6	3	+3	4	Advance to knockout stage
2	C	Palestine	3	1	1	1	5	5	0	4	Advance to knockout stage
3	B	Syria	3	1	1	1	1	1	0	4	Advance to knockout stage
4	D	Indonesia	3	1	0	2	3	6	−3	3	Advance to knockout stage
5	F	Oman	3	0	2	1	2	3	−1	2	
6	A	China	3	0	2	1	0	1	−1	2	

Source: AFC

== See also ==
- China at the FIFA World Cup

== Head-to-head record ==
Opponent	Pld	W	D	L	GF	GA	GD	Win %
Australia	1	0	0	1	0	2	−2	0.00
Bahrain	2	1	1	0	3	2	+1	50.00
Bangladesh	1	1	0	0	6	0	+6	100.00
India	1	1	0	0	3	0	+3	100.00
Indonesia	2	2	0	0	9	0	+9	100.00
Iran	7	0	4	3	5	12	−7	0.00
Iraq	2	2	0	0	4	0	+4	100.00
Japan	4	0	0	4	5	10	−5	0.00
Kuwait	5	2	2	1	5	3	+2	40.00
Kyrgyzstan	1	1	0	0	2	1	+1	100.00
Lebanon	1	0	1	0	0	0	+0	0.00
Malaysia	2	1	1	0	6	2	+4	50.00
North Korea	2	1	0	1	3	3	+0	50.00
Philippines	1	1	0	0	3	0	+3	100.00
Qatar	5	3	0	2	6	5	+1	60.00
Saudi Arabia	5	1	1	3	5	8	−3	20.00
Singapore	1	1	0	0	2	0	+2	100.00
South Korea	4	0	1	3	3	7	−4	0.00
Syria	3	2	0	1	6	1	+5	66.67
Tajikistan	1	0	1	0	0	0	+0	0.00
Thailand	2	1	1	0	2	1	+1	50.00
United Arab Emirates	2	1	1	0	6	1	+5	50.00
Uzbekistan	4	1	1	2	4	8	−4	25.00
Total	59	23	15	21	88	66	+22	38.98
