= 1986 FIFA World Cup qualification – AFC first round =

International football competition

The 1986 FIFA World Cup qualification AFC first round was part of the AFC qualifying tournament for the 1986 FIFA World Cup. 27 national teams were separated into an Eastern and Western zone where they were split into groups of 3 or 4, with the group winners progressing to the second round.

The teams which qualified for the second round were United Arab Emirates, Iraq, Syria, Bahrain, South Korea, Indonesia, Hong Kong and Japan.

India entered the World Cup qualifiers for the first time after 35 year wait. The last time they entered, they had directly qualified for the 1950 edition of the World Cup.

== West Asia Zone ==
=== Group 1A ===
Team	Pld	W	D	L	GF	GA	GD	Pts
United Arab Emirates	2	1	1	0	1	0	+1	3
Saudi Arabia	2	0	1	1	0	1	−1	1
Oman	Withdrew							

12 April 1985

Saudi Arabia	0–0	United Arab Emirates
	Report

King Fahd Stadium, Riyadh
Attendance: 30,973
Referee: Mohammad Sakran (Jordan)

19 April 1985

United Arab Emirates	1–0	Saudi Arabia
F. Khamees 12'	Report

Zabeel Stadium, Dubai
Attendance: 15,000
Referee: Bob Valentine (Scotland)

=== Group 1B ===
Team	Pld	W	D	L	GF	GA	GD	Pts
Iraq	4	3	0	1	7	6	+1	6
Qatar	4	2	0	2	6	3	+3	4
Jordan	4	1	0	3	3	7	−4	2
Lebanon	Withdrew							

Lebanon played 4 matches before withdrawing, their results were annulled.

15 March 1985

Jordan	1–0	Qatar
Saleh 83'	Report

Amman, Jordan
Referee: Abuwahid Shambe Al-Baluchi (Oman)
15 March 1985

Iraq	6–0 (Annulled)	Lebanon
Radhi; Saeed; Allawi; Hashim

Kuwait City, Kuwait
Referee: Fallaj Al-Shanar (Saudi Arabia)

18 March 1985

Lebanon	0–6 (Annulled)	Iraq
		Radhi; Saeed; Allawi

Kuwait City, Kuwait
Referee: Fahd Al-Dahmash (Saudi Arabia)

22 March 1985

Qatar	7–0 (Annulled)	Lebanon
Muftah; Khamis; Khalfan; Daham

Doha, Qatar
Referee: Hamed Assaid (Oman)

27 March 1985

Lebanon	0–8 (Annulled)	Qatar
		Muftah 27', 73', 85', 88'; Zaid 61', 65', 69'; Al-Mehaizaa 13'

Doha, Qatar
Referee: Jassim Mandi (Bahrain)

29 March 1985

Jordan	2–3	Iraq
Al-Dawud ?'; Abu Abed ?'	Report	Munir ?'; Radhi ?'; Saeed ?'

Amman, Jordan
Referee: Abdulaziz Saleh Al-Salmi (Kuwait)

5 April 1985

Qatar	3–0	Iraq
Muftah 40'; Issa Al-Mohammadi 52' (pen.); Al-Ammari 71'	Report

Doha, Qatar
Referee: Na Yoon-Shik (South Korea)

12 April 1985

Qatar	2–0	Jordan
Zaid 53'; Malalla 78'	Report

Doha, Qatar
Referee: Mohamed Sanhoub (Yemen)

19 April 1985

Iraq	2–0	Jordan
Radhi 46'; Allawi 50'	Report

Kuwait City, Kuwait
Referee: Jamal Al-Sharif (Syria)

5 May 1985

Iraq	2–1	Qatar
Radhi 21'; Allawi 76'	Report	Muftah 44'

Yuva Bharati Krirangan, Calcutta, India
Attendance: 30,000
Referee: George Courtney (England)

=== Group 2A ===
Team	Pld	W	D	L	GF	GA	GD	Pts
Syria	4	3	1	0	5	0	+5	7
Kuwait	4	2	1	1	8	2	+6	5
North Yemen	4	0	0	4	1	12	−11	0

22 March 1985

Syria	1–0	Kuwait
Madarati 78'	Report

Abbasiyyin Stadium, Damascus
Attendance: 21,000
Referee: Ahmad Bash (Jordan)

29 March 1985

North Yemen	0–1	Syria
	Report	Al-Sel 70'

Revolution 1962 Stadium, Sana'a
Attendance: 15,000
Referee: Abuwahid Shambe Al-Baluchi (Oman)

5 April 1985

Kuwait	5–0	North Yemen
Al-Anberi 39', 44'; Al-Hasawi 58'; Al-Dakhil 80'; Yaqoub 88'	Report

Kuwait City
Referee: Hussein Suleiman Awil (Jordan)

12 April 1985

Kuwait	0–0	Syria
	Report

Kuwait City
Referee: Abdul-Rahman Jassim Mandi (Bahrain)

19 April 1985

Syria	3–0	North Yemen
Al-Sayed 31', 70'; Al-Sheikh 40'	Report

Abbasiyyin Stadium, Damascus
Attendance: 28,000
Referee: Ahmed Jassim Mohamed (Bahrain)

26 April 1985

North Yemen	1–3	Kuwait
Abbas 88'	Report	Al-Hasawi 13', 57'; Al-Dakhil 25'

Revolution 1962 Stadium, Sana'a
Attendance: 10,000
Referee: Mohamed Saleh Alawi Al-Farisi (Oman)

=== Group 2B ===
Team	Pld	W	D	L	GF	GA	GD	Pts
Bahrain	2	1	1	0	7	4	+3	3
South Yemen	2	0	1	1	4	7	−3	1
Iran	Disqualified							

Iran disqualified for refusing to play matches on neutral ground

29 March 1985

South Yemen	1–4	Bahrain
Al-Mass 74'	Report	Farhan 9', 50'; Al-Hardan 17'; Al-Sobaei 60'

Mortayer Yard, Aden
Attendance: 19,082
Referee: Fallaj Al-Shanar (Saudi Arabia)

12 April 1985

Bahrain	3–3	South Yemen
Al-Hardan 48'; Abdullah 66'; Daif 69'	Report	Shadli 18'; Kassim 75'; Al-Sabbou 88'

Bahrain National Stadium, Manama
Attendance: 3,216
Referee: Abdullah Ghareeb Shehab (Kuwait)

== East Asia Zone ==
=== Group 3A ===
Team	Pld	W	D	L	GF	GA	GD	Pts
South Korea	4	3	0	1	8	1	+7	6
Malaysia	4	2	1	1	6	2	+4	5
Nepal	4	0	1	3	0	11	−11	1

2 March 1985

Nepal	0–2	South Korea
	Report	Sharma 35' (o.g.); Lee Tae-ho 64' (pen.)

Dasarath Rangasala Stadium, Kathmandu
Attendance: 40,000
Referee: Zhang Daqiao (China)

10 March 1985

Malaysia	1–0	South Korea
Salleh 49'	Report

Stadium Merdeka, Kuala Lumpur
Attendance: 36,738
Referee: Samuel Chan Yam-Ming (Hong Kong)

16 March 1985

Nepal	0–0	Malaysia
	Report

Dasarath Rangasala Stadium, Kathmandu
Attendance: 8,000
Referee: Nadasen Chandra (Singapore)

31 March 1985

Malaysia	5–0	Nepal
Hassan 4', 26', 33'; Salleh 29'; Alif 40'	Report

Stadium Merdeka, Kuala Lumpur
Attendance: 33,000
Referee: Lourenco Reinaldo (Macau)

6 April 1985

South Korea	4–0	Nepal
Huh Jung-moo 18', 57'; Kim Seok-won 36'; Chung Jong-soo 41'	Report

Dongdaemun Stadium, Seoul
Referee: Cheung Kwok Kui (Hong Kong)

19 May 1985

South Korea	2–0	Malaysia
Park Chang-sun 12' (pen.); Cho Min-kook 19'	Report

Olympic Stadium, Seoul
Attendance: 45,780
Referee: Shizuo Takada (Japan)

=== Group 3B ===
Team	Pld	W	D	L	GF	GA	GD	Pts
Indonesia	6	4	1	1	8	4	+4	9
India	6	2	3	1	7	6	+1	7
Thailand	6	1	2	3	4	4	0	4
Bangladesh	6	2	0	4	5	10	−5	4

15 March 1985

Indonesia	1–0	Thailand
Sulaiman 84'	Report

Senayan Stadium, Jakarta
Attendance: 60,000
Referee: Tulu Gurkan (Philippines)

18 March 1985

Indonesia	2–0	Bangladesh
Nurdiansyah 48'; Sulaiman 57'	Report

Senayan Stadium, Jakarta
Attendance: 40,000
Referee: Cesar Brillantes (Philippines)

21 March 1985

Indonesia	2–1	India
Nurdiansyah 41', 49'	Report	K. Dey 34'

Senayan Stadium, Jakarta
Attendance: 70,000
Referee: Reynaldo Reyes (Philippines)

23 March 1985

Thailand	3–0	Bangladesh
Thanis 2'; Vitoon 9'; Sakdarin 44'	Report

Suphachalasai Stadium, Bangkok
Referee: Shunsaku Nakanishi (Japan)

26 March 1985

Thailand	0–0	India
	Report

Suphachalasai Stadium, Bangkok
Referee: Shunsaku Nakanishi (Japan)

29 March 1985

Thailand	0–1	Indonesia
	Report	Kiswanto 25'

Suphachalasai Stadium, Bangkok
Referee: Toshikazu Sano (Japan)

30 March 1985

Bangladesh	1–2	India
Chunnu 42'	Report	Ghosh 34'; Panji 84'

Dhaka Stadium, Dhaka
Attendance: 8,000
Referee: Liu Jingli (China)

2 April 1985

Bangladesh	2–1	Indonesia
Kaiser 75'; Chunnu 81'	Report	Nurdiansyah 11'

Dhaka Stadium, Dhaka
Attendance: 5,000
Referee: Xia Changfa (China)

5 April 1985

Bangladesh	1–0	Thailand
Elias 76'	Report

Dhaka Stadium, Dhaka
Attendance: 7,000
Referee: Chen Shengcai (China)

6 April 1985

India	1–1	Indonesia
Thapa 89'	Report	Sulaiman 20'

Salt Lake Stadium, Calcutta
Attendance: 10,000
Referee: Farouk Mustafa (Iraq)

9 April 1985

India	1–1	Thailand
K. Dey 85'	Report	Narasak 76'

Salt Lake Stadium, Calcutta
Attendance: 6,000
Referee: Shokor Abdulkader Abdul Latif (Iraq)

12 April 1985

India	2–1	Bangladesh
Panji 36'; Gonsalves 54'	Report	Bhadra 15'

Salt Lake Stadium, Calcutta
Attendance: 8,000
Referee: Salih Abdul Karim Saadi (Iraq)

=== Group 4A ===
Team	Pld	W	D	L	GF	GA	GD	Pts
Hong Kong	6	5	1	0	19	2	+17	11
China	6	4	1	1	23	2	+21	9
Macau	6	2	0	4	4	15	−11	4
Brunei	6	0	0	6	2	29	−27	0

17 February 1985

Macau	2–0	Brunei
Meng Kam Jong 76'; Carvalhal 82'	Report

Canidrome, Nossa Senhora de Fátima
Attendance: 495
Referee: Reynaldo Reyes (Philippines)

17 February 1985

Hong Kong	0–0	China
	Report

Government Stadium, Hong Kong
Attendance: 20,935
Referee: Maidin Bin Singah (Singapore)

20 February 1985

Macau	0–4	China
	Report	Ng Chi Kit 44' (o.g.); Lin Qiang 51'; Zuo Shusheng 52'; Lin Lefeng 62'

Canidrome, Nossa Senhora de Fátima
Attendance: 1,048
Referee: S.Balasundram (Malaysia)

23 February 1985

Hong Kong	8–0	Brunei
Mak King-Fun 2', 51', 79', 85'; Lai Wing Cheung 4'; Lee Wai-Shan 30'; Lau Wing Yip 74', 87'	Report

Government Stadium, Hong Kong
Attendance: 12,401
Referee: Stephen Ovinis (Malaysia)

26 February 1985

China	8–0	Brunei
Zhao Dayu 26', 85', 90'; Zuo Shusheng 38', 65'; Li Hui 40'; Liu Haiguang 44', 47'	Report

Canidrome, Nossa Senhora de Fátima
Attendance: 960
Referee: Pamon Saismutr (Thailand)

1 March 1985

Brunei	0–4	China
	Report	Zhao Dayu 8', 74'; Liu Haiguang 15', 80'

Government Stadium, Hong Kong
Attendance: 2,019
Referee: Mohammed Jahirul Haq (Bangladesh)

6 April 1985

Brunei	1–5	Hong Kong
Zainuddin Kassim 49'	Report	Wan Chi Keung 4', 82'; Lai Wing-Cheung 7'; Lau Wing Yip 38', 83'

Sultan Hassal Bolkiah Stadium, Bandar Seri Begawan
Referee: Sudarso Hardjowasito (Indonesia)

13 April 1985

Brunei	1–2	Macau
Ahmed Rahim ?'	Report	Carvalhal ?'; Pinto ?'

Sultan Hassal Bolkiah Stadium, Bandar Seri Begawan
Referee: Djadja Mudjahidin (Indonesia)

28 April 1985

Macau	0–2	Hong Kong
	Report	Lau Wing Yip 80'; Cheung Ka-Ping 88'

Canidrome, Nossa Senhora de Fátima
Attendance: 4,000
Referee: Somporn Patcharamukdakorn (Thailand)

4 May 1985

Hong Kong	2–0	Macau
Lau Wing Yip 8', 30'	Report

Government Stadium, Hong Kong
Attendance: 15,778
Referee: Kil Ki-Chul (South Korea)

12 May 1985

China	6–0	Macau
Jia Xiuquan 10'; Li Hui 12'; Yang Zhaohui 27', 50'; Wang Huiliang 60'; Zhao Dayu 67'	Report

Workers' Stadium, Beijing
Attendance: 30,000
Referee: Shetty Sheena (India)

19 May 1985

China	1–2	Hong Kong
Li Hui 32'	Report	Cheung Chi Tak 26'; Ku Kam Fai 60'

Workers' Stadium, Beijing
Attendance: 60,000
Referee: Melvyn J. Victor D'Souza (India)

=== Group 4B ===
Team	Pld	W	D	L	GF	GA	GD	Pts
Japan	4	3	1	0	9	1	+8	7
North Korea	4	1	2	1	3	2	+1	4
Singapore	4	0	1	3	2	11	−9	1

19 January 1985

Singapore	1–1	North Korea
Pak Kuan ?' (pen.)	Report	Yu Song-chol ?' (pen.)

National Stadium, Singapore
Referee: Sudarso Harjowasito (Indonesia)

23 February 1985

Singapore	1–3	Japan
Madon 39'	Report	Kimura 20'; Hashiratani 47'; Kato 84'

National Stadium, Singapore
Attendance: 16,146
Referee: Soetoyo Hartasardjono (Indonesia)

21 March 1985

Japan	1–0	North Korea
Hara 20'	Report

National Stadium, Tokyo
Attendance: 25,000
Referee: Timothy Joseph (Malaysia)

30 April 1985

North Korea	0–0	Japan
	Report

Kim Il-sung Stadium, Pyongyang
Attendance: 52,500
Referee: Samuel Chan Yam-Ming (Hong Kong)

18 May 1985

Japan	5–0	Singapore
Mizunuma 48'; Nishimura 57', 59'; Hara 79'; Kimura 86'	Report

National Stadium, Tokyo
Attendance: 28,000
Referee: Cha Kyung-Bok (South Korea)

25 May 1985

North Korea	2–0	Singapore
Yun Jong-su 25'; Han Hyong-Il 55'	Report

Nampo Stadium, Nampo
Attendance: 25,000
Referee: Sukho Vuddhijoti (Thailand)
