= 1986 FIFA World Cup qualification (AFC) =

Tournament details
- Teams: 27 (from 1 confederation)

Tournament statistics
- Top scorer: (Hong Kong) Lau Wing Yip (7 goals)

Listed below are the dates and results for the 1986 FIFA World Cup qualification rounds for the Asian zone (AFC). For an overview of the qualification rounds, see the article 1986 FIFA World Cup qualification.

A total of 28 AFC teams entered the competition. However, Chinese Taipei were assigned to the Oceanian zone instead. The Asian zone was allocated 2 places (out of 24) in the final tournament. Asia's automatic qualifying berths were taken by Iraq and Korea Republic.

== Tournament structure ==
The 27 teams were divided into 2 zones, based on geographical considerations. Zone A had 13 teams (teams from West Asia) and Zone B had 14 teams (teams from East Asia). There would be three rounds of play in each zone:

- First Round: The teams were divided into 4 groups of 3 or 4 teams each. The teams played against each other on a home-and-away basis. The group winners would advance to the Second Round.
- Second Round: The 4 teams in each zone were paired up to play knockout matches on a home-and-away basis. The winners would advance to the Final Round.
- Final Round: The 2 teams in each zone played against each other on a home-and-away basis. The winners would qualify for the 1986 FIFA World Cup.

Due to wars their countries were involved in, Iran, Iraq and Lebanon had to play all their home matches on neutral ground or away. Iran refused this arrangement and were disqualified, while Lebanon withdrew from the qualifiers after the fourth match.

== AFC Zone A (West) ==
=== First round ===
==== Group 1A ====
Team	Pld	W	D	L	GF	GA	GD	Pts
United Arab Emirates	2	1	1	0	1	0	+1	3
Saudi Arabia	2	0	1	1	0	1	−1	1
Oman	Withdrew							

	(Oman)	(Saudi Arabia)	(United Arab Emirates)
Oman	—	—	—
Saudi Arabia	—	—	0–0
United Arab Emirates	—	1–0	—

==== Group 1B ====
Team	Pld	W	D	L	GF	GA	GD	Pts
Iraq	4	3	0	1	7	6	+1	6
Qatar	4	2	0	2	6	3	+3	4
Jordan	4	1	0	3	3	7	−4	2
Lebanon	Withdrew							

	(Iraq)	(Jordan)	(Lebanon)	(Qatar)
Iraq	—	2–0	—	2–1
Jordan	2–3	—	—	1–0
Lebanon	—	—	—	—
Qatar	3–0	2–0	—	—

==== Group 2A ====
Team	Pld	W	D	L	GF	GA	GD	Pts
Syria	4	3	1	0	5	0	+5	7
Kuwait	4	2	1	1	8	2	+6	5
North Yemen	4	0	0	4	1	12	−11	0

	(Kuwait)	(Yemen Arab Republic)	(Syria)
Kuwait	—	5–0	0–0
North Yemen	1–3	—	0–1
Syria	1–0	3–0	—

==== Group 2B ====
Team	Pld	W	D	L	GF	GA	GD	Pts
Bahrain	2	1	1	0	7	4	+3	3
South Yemen	2	0	1	1	4	7	−3	1
Iran	Disqualified							

	(Bahrain)	(Iran)	(South Yemen)
Bahrain	—	—	3–3
Iran	—	—	—
South Yemen	1–4	—	—

=== Second round ===
Team 1	Agg.	Team 2	1st leg	2nd leg
United Arab Emirates	4–4 (a)	Iraq	2–3	2–1
Bahrain	1–2	Syria	1–1	0–1

==== First leg ====
20 September 1985

United Arab Emirates	2–3	Iraq
Al-Talyani 15'; F. Khamees 60'	Report	Saeed 42', 79'; Hashim 81'

Al-Rashid Stadium, Dubai
Referee: Abdul-Aziz Saleh Al-Salmi (Kuwait)

6 September 1985

Bahrain	1–1	Syria
Issa 42'	Report	Mahrous 61'

Bahrain National Stadium, Riffa
Attendance: 8,224
Referee: Ahmad Bash (Jordan)

==== Second leg ====
27 September 1985

Iraq	1–2	United Arab Emirates
Saddam 88'	Report	F. Khamees 2'; Al-Talyani 60'

King Fahd Stadium, Ta'if
Attendance: 4,175
Referee: Daina (Switzerland)

4–4 on aggregate, Iraq advanced to the Zone A Final Round on away goals.

20 September 1985

Syria	1–0	Bahrain
Kardaghli 4'	Report

Abbasiyyin Stadium, Damascus
Attendance: 25,000
Referee: Abuwahid Shambe El-Boloshi (Oman)

Syria advanced to the Zone A Final Round.

=== Final round ===
Team 1	Agg.	Team 2	1st leg	2nd leg
Syria	1–3	Iraq	0–0	1–3

==== First leg ====
15 November 1985

Syria	0–0	Iraq
	Report

Abbasiyyin Stadium, Damascus
Attendance: 25,000
Referee: Vautrot (France)

==== Second leg ====
29 November 1985

Iraq	3–1	Syria
Saeed 28'; Mahmoud 49'; Allawi 72'	Report	Al-Sel 54' (pen.)

King Fahd Stadium, Ta'if
Attendance: 4,500
Referee: Erik Fredriksson (Sweden)

Iraq won 3–1 on aggregate and qualified for the 1986 FIFA World Cup.

== AFC Zone B (East) ==
=== First round ===
==== Group 3A ====
Team	Pld	W	D	L	GF	GA	GD	Pts
South Korea	4	3	0	1	8	1	+7	6
Malaysia	4	2	1	1	6	2	+4	5
Nepal	4	0	1	3	0	11	−11	1

	(South Korea)	(Malaysia)	(Nepal)
South Korea	—	2–0	4–0
Malaysia	1–0	—	5–0
Nepal	0–2	0–0	—

==== Group 3B ====
Team	Pld	W	D	L	GF	GA	GD	Pts
Indonesia	6	4	1	1	8	4	+4	9
India	6	2	3	1	7	6	+1	7
Thailand	6	1	2	3	4	4	0	4
Bangladesh	6	2	0	4	5	10	−5	4

	(Bangladesh)	(India)	(Indonesia)	(Thailand)
Bangladesh	—	1–2	2–1	1–0
India	2–1	—	1–1	1–1
Indonesia	2–0	2–1	—	1–0
Thailand	3–0	0–0	0–1	—

==== Group 4A ====
Team	Pld	W	D	L	GF	GA	GD	Pts
Hong Kong	6	5	1	0	19	2	+17	11
China	6	4	1	1	23	2	+21	9
Macau	6	2	0	4	4	15	−11	4
Brunei	6	0	0	6	2	29	−27	0

	(Brunei)	(China)	(Hong Kong)	(Macau)
Brunei	—	0–4	1–5	1–2
China	8–0	—	1–2	6–0
Hong Kong	8–0	0–0	—	2–0
Macau	2–0	0–4	0–2	—

==== Group 4B ====
Team	Pld	W	D	L	GF	GA	GD	Pts
Japan	4	3	1	0	9	1	+8	7
North Korea	4	1	2	1	3	2	+1	4
Singapore	4	0	1	3	2	11	−9	1

	(Japan)	(North Korea)	(Singapore)
Japan	—	1–0	5–0
North Korea	0–0	—	2–0
Singapore	1–3	1–1	—

=== Second round ===
Team 1	Agg.	Team 2	1st leg	2nd leg
South Korea	6–1	Indonesia	2–0	4–1
Japan	5–1	Hong Kong	3–0	2–1

==== First leg ====
21 July 1985

South Korea	2–0	Indonesia
Byun Byung-joo 73'; Kim Joo-sung 81'	Report

Olympic Stadium, Seoul
Attendance: 80,000
Referee: Booncherd Pratumthong (Thailand)
11 August 1985

Japan	3–0	Hong Kong
Kimura 9' (pen.); Hara 11'; Mizunuma 53'	Report

Universiade Stadium, Kobe
Attendance: 19,000
Referee: Tulu Gurkan (Philippines)

==== Second leg ====
30 July 1985

Indonesia	1–4	South Korea
Sulaiman 87'	Report	Byun Byung-joo 7'; Choi Soon-ho 9'; Huh Jung-moo 32'; Kim Joo-sung 47'

Senayan Stadium, Jakarta
Attendance: 80,000
Referee: Timothy Joseph (Malaysia)

Korea Republic won 6–1 on aggregate and advanced to the Zone B Final Round.

22 September 1985

Hong Kong	1–2	Japan
Wan Chi Keung 79'	Report	Kimura 45'; Hara 90'

Government Stadium, Hong Kong
Attendance: 28,000
Referee: Lee Kok Leong (Singapore)

Japan won 5–1 on aggregate and advanced to the Zone B Final Round.

=== Final round ===
Team 1	Agg.	Team 2	1st leg	2nd leg
Japan	1–3	South Korea	1–2	0–1

==== First leg ====
26 October 1985

Japan	1–2	South Korea
Kimura 43'	Report	Chung Yong-hwan 30'; Lee Tae-ho 42'

National Stadium, Tokyo
Attendance: 62,000
Referee: Maidin Bin-Singah (Singapore)

==== Second leg ====
3 November 1985

South Korea	1–0	Japan
Huh Jung-moo 61'	Report

Olympic Stadium, Seoul
Attendance: 70,000
Referee: Othman Bin Omar (Malaysia)

Korea Republic won 3–1 on aggregate and qualified for the 1986 World Cup

== Qualified teams ==
The following two teams from AFC qualified for the final tournament.

Team	Qualified as	Qualified on	Previous appearances in FIFA World Cup^{1}
Iraq	Zone A final round winners	29 November 1985	0 (debut)
South Korea	Zone B final round winners	3 November 1985	1 (1954)

^{1} Bold indicates champions for that year. Italic indicates hosts for that year.

== Goalscorers ==
7 goals

- (Hong Kong) Lau Wing Yip

6 goals

- (China) Zhao Dayu

5 goals

- (Japan) Kazushi Kimura

4 goals

- (China) Liu Haiguang
- (Hong Kong) Mak King-Fun
- (Indonesia) Bambang Nurdiansyah
- (Indonesia) Dede Sulaiman
- (Iraq) Hussein Saeed
- (Japan) Hiromi Hara
- (South Korea) Huh Jung-moo

3 goals

- (China) Li Hui
- (China) Zuo Shusheng
- (Hong Kong) Wan Chi Keung
- (Iraq) Ahmed Radhi
- (Japan) Takashi Mizunuma
- (Japan) Akihiro Nishimura
- (Kuwait) Salah Al-Hasawi
- (Malaysia) Zainal Abidin Hassan

2 goals

- (Bahrain) Ibrahim Al-Hardan
- (Bahrain) Ibrahim Farhan
- (Bangladesh) Ashrafuddin Chunnu
- (China) Yang Zhaohui
- (Hong Kong) Lai Wing-Cheung
- (India) Krishanu Dey
- (India) Bikash Panji
- (Iraq) Khalil Allawi
- (Kuwait) Abdul-Aziz Al-Anbari
- (Kuwait) Faisal Al-Dakhil
- (Macau) Alberto Carvalhal
- (Malaysia) Dollah Salleh
- (Qatar) Mansour Muftah
- (South Korea) Byun Byung-joo
- (South Korea) Kim Joo-sung
- (South Korea) Lee Tae-ho
- (Syria) Mahmoud Al-Sayed
- (Syria) Walid Abu Al-Sel
- (United Arab Emirates) Adnan Al-Talyani
- (United Arab Emirates) Fahad Khamees

1 goal

- (Bahrain) Rahman Hisham Abdullah
- (Bahrain) Yousif Al-Sobaei
- (Bahrain) Adnan Ali Deif
- (Bahrain) Ebrahim Isa
- (Bangladesh) Ashish Bhadra
- (Bangladesh) Kaiser Hamid
- (Bangladesh) Elias Hossein
- (Brunei) Zainudin Kassim
- (Brunei) Ahmed Rahim
- (China) Jia Xiuquan
- (China) Lin Lefeng
- (China) Lin Qiang
- (China) Wang Huiliang
- (Hong Kong) Cheung Chi Tak
- (Hong Kong) Cheung Ka-Ping
- (Hong Kong) Ku Kam Fai
- (Hong Kong) Sze Wai-Shan
- (India) Camilo Gonsalves
- (India) Sisir Ghosh
- (India) Narender Thapa
- (Indonesia) Herry Kiswanto
- (Iraq) Karim Allawi
- (Iraq) Shaker Mahmoud
- (Iraq) Haris Mohammed
- (Iraq) Wamidh Munir
- (Iraq) Karim Saddam
- (Japan) Koichi Hashiratani
- (Japan) Hisashi Kato
- (Jordan) Jamal Abu Abed
- (Jordan) Rateb Al-Dawud
- (Jordan) Issam Said Saleh
- (Kuwait) Jamal Yaqoub
- (Macau) Meng Kam Jong
- (Macau) Daniel Pinto
- (Malaysia) Yunus Alif
- (North Korea) Han Hyong-Il
- (North Korea) Song Chul Yu
- (North Korea) Yung Jong-Sung
- (Yemen Arab Republic) Abdulnaser Abbas
- (Qatar) Mohamed Al Ammari
- (Qatar) Issa Al-Mohammadi
- (Qatar) Ali Zaid
- (Qatar) Adel Ahmed Malalla
- (Singapore) Au-Yeong Pak Kuan
- (Singapore) Yahya Madon
- (South Korea) Cho Min-kook
- (South Korea) Choi Soon-ho
- (South Korea) Chung Jong-soo
- (South Korea) Chung Yong-hwan
- (South Korea) Kim Seok-won
- (South Korea) Park Chang-sun
- (South Yemen) Abubakar Al-Mass
- (South Yemen) Adnan Ahmed Al-Sabbou
- (South Yemen) Tariq Abdullah Kassim
- (South Yemen) Wagdan Mahmoud Shadli
- (Syria) Radwan Al-Shaikh
- (Syria) Abdul Kader Kardaghli
- (Syria) Nizar Mahrous
- (Syria) Marwan Medrati
- (Thailand) Thanis Areesa-ngarkul
- (Thailand) Narasak Boonkleang
- (Thailand) Vithoon Kijmongkolsak
- (Thailand) Sakdarin Thongmee

1 own goal

- (Macau) Ng Chi Kit (playing against China)
- (Nepal) Rupak Raj Sharma (playing against South Korea)

== See also ==
- China v Hong Kong (1985)
- 1986 FIFA World Cup qualification (UEFA)
- 1986 FIFA World Cup qualification (CONMEBOL)
- 1986 FIFA World Cup qualification (CONCACAF)
- 1986 FIFA World Cup qualification (CAF)
- 1986 FIFA World Cup qualification (OFC)
