= 1976 AFC Asian Cup qualification =

Tournament details
- Dates: 15 March 1975 – 2 December 1975
- Teams: 15 (from 1 confederation)

Tournament statistics
- Matches played: 35
- Goals scored: 94 (2.69 per match)

The qualification for the 1976 AFC Asian Cup consisted of 17 teams in four groups. The winner and runners-up of each group would join hosts Iran in the final tournament.

== Groups ==
| Group 1 | Group 2 | Group 3 | Group 4 |
|---|---|---|---|
| ~~Bahrain~~*; Kuwait; ~~Lebanon~~*; ~~Pakistan~~*; South Yemen; ~~Syria~~* | Afghanistan; ~~Bangladesh~~*; ~~India~~*; Iraq; ~~Jordan~~*; ~~Nepal~~*; Qatar; Saudi Arabia | Brunei; ~~Burma~~*; China; Hong Kong; Japan; North Korea; Singapore; ~~Sri Lanka~~* | Indonesia; ~~Khmer Republic~~*; ~~Laos~~*; Malaysia; ~~Philippines~~*; South Korea; South Vietnam; Thailand |

- * Withdrew
- Iran qualified as host and defending champions
- Israel and Taiwan were expelled from AFC in 1974

== Qualification ==
=== Group 1 ===
All the others withdrew, so Kuwait and South Yemen qualified automatically.

=== Group 2 ===
All matches played in Iraq.

| Pos | Team | Pld | W | D | L | GF | GA | GD | Pts | Qualification |
|---|---|---|---|---|---|---|---|---|---|---|
| 1 | Iraq | 6 | 5 | 1 | 0 | 14 | 3 | +11 | 11 | 1976 AFC Asian Cup |
| 2 | Saudi Arabia | 6 | 3 | 1 | 2 | 12 | 5 | +7 | 7 | 1976 AFC Asian Cup |
| 3 | Qatar | 6 | 2 | 1 | 3 | 5 | 8 | −3 | 5 | |
| 4 | Afghanistan | 6 | 0 | 1 | 5 | 3 | 18 | −15 | 1 | |

21 November 1975

| Iraq | 1–0 | Qatar |
|---|---|---|
| Hassan 55' |

Al-Shaab Stadium, Baghdad
21 November 1975
18:00 (UTC+3)

| Saudi Arabia | 2–0 | Afghanistan |
|---|---|---|
| Al Mugnim 40'; Subhi 50' | Report |

Al-Shaab Stadium, Baghdad

23 November 1975

| Iraq | 3–1 | Afghanistan |
|---|---|---|
| Subhi 9'; Alwan 17'; Kadhim 78' | | ? (?) |

Al-Shaab Stadium, Baghdad
23 November 1975
18:00 (UTC+3)

| Saudi Arabia | 0–1 | Qatar |
|---|---|---|
| | Report | ? 8' |

Al-Shaab Stadium, Baghdad

25 November 1975
18:00 (UTC+3)

| Iraq | 1–1 | Saudi Arabia |
|---|---|---|
| Ahmed 86' | Report | Al Mugnim 4' |

Al-Shaab Stadium, Baghdad
25 November 1975

| Qatar | 2–1 | Afghanistan |

Al-Shaab Stadium, Baghdad

28 November 1975

| Iraq | 3–0 | Qatar |
|---|---|---|
| Alwan 9'; Hassan 60'; Waal 74' |

Al-Shaab Stadium, Baghdad
28 November 1975
18:00 (UTC+3)

| Saudi Arabia | 6–0 | Afghanistan |
|---|---|---|
| Al Mugnim 7', 41'; Bakhit 12', 33'; Naseab 25'; Abdeli 65' | Report |

Al-Shaab Stadium, Baghdad

30 November 1975

| Iraq | 4–0 | Afghanistan |
|---|---|---|
| Mahmoud 2', 5'; Mustafa 70'; Ahmed 84' |

Al-Shaab Stadium, Baghdad
30 November 1975
18:00 (UTC+3)

| Saudi Arabia | 2–1 | Qatar |
|---|---|---|
| Al Mugnim 52'; Bakhit 59' | Report | Alsaieq 7' |

Al-Shaab Stadium, Baghdad

2 December 1975
18:00 (UTC+3)

| Iraq | 2–1 | Saudi Arabia |
|---|---|---|
| Subhi 13'; Hassan 42' | Report | Bakhit 54' |

Al-Shaab Stadium, Baghdad
Referee: Mohsen Zamanyhe (Iran)
2 December 1975

| Qatar | 1–1 | Afghanistan |

Al-Shaab Stadium, Baghdad

Iraq and Saudi Arabia qualified for the final tournament. Saudi Arabia eventually withdrew from the competition.

=== Group 3 ===
All matches played in Hong Kong.

Group allocation matches where winners were divided into separate groups.

14 June 1975

| Hong Kong | 0–0 | Japan |
Penalties
| | 4–3 |

Government Stadium, Hong Kong
Attendance: 26,000
Referee: Watana Promasakhanaskolnakorn (Thailand)

15 June 1975

| China | 1–0 | North Korea |
|---|---|---|
| Li Guoning 40' |

Government Stadium, Hong Kong
Attendance: 28,864

15 June 1975
18:30 (UTC+8)

| Singapore | 6–0 | Brunei |
|---|---|---|
| Kassim 1', 58'; Gulam 10', 14'; Noh 45'; Abidin 80' |

Government Stadium, Hong Kong
Referee: Ruslan Hatta (Indonesia)

==== Group 3A ====
| Pos | Team | Pld | W | D | L | GF | GA | GD | Pts | Qualification |
|---|---|---|---|---|---|---|---|---|---|---|
| 1 | China | 2 | 2 | 0 | 0 | 11 | 1 | +10 | 4 | Advance to semi-finals |
| 2 | Hong Kong | 2 | 1 | 0 | 1 | 3 | 1 | +2 | 2 | Advance to semi-finals |
| 3 | Brunei | 2 | 0 | 0 | 2 | 1 | 13 | −12 | 0 | |

17 June 1975

| China | 10–1 | Brunei |
|---|---|---|
| Li Zhouzhe 4', 22', 25'; Chi Shangbin 30'; De Zudian 35'; Lin Xinjiang 50'; Yang Limin 68', 88'; Rong Zhixing 74'; Liu Jinshan 83' | | Tuah 87' |

Government Stadium, Hong Kong
Attendance: 9,465

19 June 1975

| Hong Kong | 3–0 | Brunei |

Government Stadium, Hong Kong

21 June 1975

| Hong Kong | 0–1 | China |
|---|---|---|
| | | Rong Zhixing 82' |

Government Stadium, Hong Kong
Attendance: 28,550

==== Group 3B ====
| Pos | Team | Pld | W | D | L | GF | GA | GD | Pts | Qualification |
|---|---|---|---|---|---|---|---|---|---|---|
| 1 | North Korea | 2 | 2 | 0 | 0 | 2 | 0 | +2 | 4 | Advance to semi-finals |
| 2 | Japan | 2 | 1 | 0 | 1 | 2 | 2 | 0 | 2 | Advance to semi-finals |
| 3 | Singapore | 2 | 0 | 0 | 2 | 1 | 3 | −2 | 0 | |

17 June 1975

| North Korea | 1–0 | Japan |
|---|---|---|
| An Se-uk 65' (pen.) |

Government Stadium, Hong Kong
Attendance: 30,000

19 June 1975

| North Korea | 1–0 | Singapore |
|---|---|---|
| Kim Bok-nam 52' |

Government Stadium, Hong Kong
Attendance: 12,000
Referee: Marcus Wong (Hong Kong)

21 June 1975

| Japan | 2–1 | Singapore |
|---|---|---|
| Ochiai 40'; Nagai 82' | | Anandan 79' |

Government Stadium, Hong Kong
Attendance: 28,000
Referee: Tam Sun Luk (Hong Kong)

==== Semi-finals ====
23 June 1975

| China | 2–1 | Japan |
|---|---|---|
| Li Zhouzhe 4'; Chi Shangbin 33' | | Arai 44' |

Government Stadium, Hong Kong
Attendance: 22,265

24 June 1975

| North Korea | 3–3 | Hong Kong |
Penalties
| | 11–10 |

Government Stadium, Hong Kong

==== Third place match ====
26 June 1975

| Hong Kong | 0–1 | Japan |
|---|---|---|
| | | Watanabe 6' |

Government Stadium, Hong Kong
Attendance: 30,000
Referee: Hashita (Indonesia)

==== Final ====
26 June 1975

| North Korea | 2–0 | China |
|---|---|---|
| Hong Song-nam 8'; Myong Dong-chan 28' |

Government Stadium, Hong Kong
Attendance: 28,566

North Korea and China qualified for the final tournament. North Korea eventually withdrew from the competition.

=== Group 4 ===
All matches played in Thailand.

| Pos | Team | Pld | W | D | L | GF | GA | GD | Pts | Qualification |
|---|---|---|---|---|---|---|---|---|---|---|
| 1 | Malaysia | 4 | 3 | 1 | 0 | 6 | 1 | +5 | 7 | 1976 AFC Asian Cup |
| 2 | Thailand | 4 | 3 | 0 | 1 | 8 | 2 | +6 | 6 | 1976 AFC Asian Cup |
| 3 | South Korea | 4 | 2 | 0 | 2 | 3 | 3 | 0 | 4 | |
| 4 | Indonesia | 4 | 1 | 1 | 2 | 3 | 5 | −2 | 3 | |
| 5 | South Vietnam | 4 | 0 | 0 | 4 | 1 | 10 | −9 | 0 | |

15 March 1975

| Thailand | 3–1 | Indonesia |
|---|---|---|
| Naphatalung 60', 66'; Maklamthong 88' | | Pangdee 70' (o.g.) |

National Stadium, Bangkok

16 March 1975

| Malaysia | 2–1 | South Korea |
|---|---|---|
| Bakar 19'; Dahari 50' | | Cho Dong-hyun 34' |

National Stadium, Bangkok
Attendance: 4,000

17 March 1975

| Indonesia | 2–1 | South Vietnam |
|---|---|---|
| Wibisono 9', 13' | | ? 32' |

National Stadium, Bangkok
Attendance: 1,000

18 March 1975

| Thailand | 0–1 | Malaysia |

National Stadium, Bangkok

19 March 1975

| South Korea | 1–0 | South Vietnam |

National Stadium, Bangkok

20 March 1975

| Malaysia | 0–0 | Indonesia |

National Stadium, Bangkok

21 March 1975

| Thailand | 4–0 | South Vietnam |

National Stadium, Bangkok

22 March 1975

| South Korea | 1–0 | Indonesia |

National Stadium, Bangkok

23 March 1975

| Malaysia | 3–0 | South Vietnam |

National Stadium, Bangkok

24 March 1975

| Thailand | 1–0 | South Korea |
|---|---|---|
| Pongsri 10' (pen.) |

National Stadium, Bangkok
Attendance: 20,000

Malaysia and Thailand qualified for the final tournament. Thailand eventually withdrew from the competition.

== Qualified teams ==
| Team | Qualified as | Qualified on | Previous appearance |
|---|---|---|---|
| Iran | Hosts | N/A | 2 (1968, 1972) |
| Kuwait | Automatically qualified from Group 1 | 1975 | 1 (1972) |
| South Yemen | Automatically qualified from Group 1 | 1975 | 0 (debut) |
| Iraq | Group 2 winners | 2 December 1975 | 1 (1972) |
| ~~Saudi Arabia~~ (Note: Withdrew after qualifying) | ~~Group 2 runners-up~~ | ~~2 December 1975~~ | ~~0 (debut)~~ |
| ~~North Korea~~ | ~~Group 3 winners~~ | ~~24 June 1975~~ | ~~0 (debut)~~ |
| China | Group 3 runners-up | 23 June 1975 | 0 (debut) |
| Malaysia | Group 4 winners | 23 March 1975 | 0 (debut) |
| ~~Thailand~~ | ~~Group 4 runners-up~~ | ~~24 March 1975~~ | ~~1 (1972)~~ |

== Goalscorers ==
There were 94 goals scored in 35 matches, for an average of 2.69 goals per match.

5 goals

- (Saudi Arabia) Mohammed Al Mugnim

4 goals

- (China) Li Zhouzhe
- (Saudi Arabia) Mohsen Bakhit

3 goals

- (Iraq) Falah Hassan

2 goals

- (China) Chi Shangbin
- (China) Rong Zhixing
- (China) Yang Limin
- (Iraq) Ahmed Subhi
- (Iraq) Ali Hussein Mahmoud
- (Iraq) Hadi Ahmed
- (Iraq) Hassani Alwan
- (Singapore) Dollah Kassim
- (Singapore) Mohammed Gulam
- (Thailand) Jesdaporn Naphatalung

1 goal

- (Brunei) Rosli Tuah
- (China) De Zudian
- (China) Li Guoning
- (China) Li Xinjiang
- (China) Liu Jinshan
- (Indonesia) Raden Mas Wibisono
- (Iraq) Ali Kadhim
- (Iraq) Hesham Mustafa
- (Iraq) Kadhim Waal
- (Japan) Hiroshi Ochiai
- (Japan) Kozo Arai
- (Japan) Mitsuo Watanabe
- (Japan) Yoshikazu Nagai
- (Malaysia) Isa Bakar
- (Malaysia) Mokhtar Dahari
- (North Korea) An Se-uk
- (North Korea) Hong Song-nam
- (North Korea) Kim Bok-nam
- (North Korea) Myong Dong-chan
- (Qatar) Majed Alsaieq
- (Saudi Arabia) Hamid Subhi
- (Saudi Arabia) Mohammad S. Abdeli
- (Saudi Arabia) Sultan Naseab
- (Singapore) Mat Noh
- (Singapore) Surash Anandan
- (Singapore) Zainal Abidin
- (South Korea) Cho Dong-hyun
- (Thailand) Pallop Maklamthong
- (Thailand) Sithiporn Pongsri

1 own goal

- (Thailand) Prajrit Pangdee
