= Alberto Carvalhal =

Portuguese sailor and Macau international footballer

Personal information
- Date of birth: 1953 (age 72–73)
- Place of birth: Canas de Senhorim, Portugal
- Position: Attacking midfielder

Youth career
- GDR Canas de Senhorim

Senior career*
Years	Team	Apps	(Gls)
–1971	GDR Canas de Senhorim		
1972–1974	Obra Social dos Serviços de Marinha		
1975–1977	Negro Rubro		
1977–????	Lam Ieng		
????–1986	Negro Rubro		

International career
1985–1986	Macau	7	(2)
- * Club domestic league appearances and goals

Alberto Carvalhal (born 1953) is a former sailor and footballer who played as an attacking midfielder. Born in Portugal, he represented the Macau national team.

== Naval career ==
Carvalhal joined the Portuguese Navy as a volunteer at the age of 17, as he wanted to see the world. Following the completion of his naval training, he served on the Portuguese frigate Almirante Gago Coutinho and made various trips, including one in which the ship escorted another carrying the remains of Pedro I of Brazil to Guanabara Bay in Rio de Janeiro as part of the 150th anniversary of Brazilian independence.

In August 1973, he was assigned to the Province of Macau, to fill a vacancy for an engine operator. He arrived via. British Hong Kong, with little knowledge of the colony, and stayed in a facility located in the present-day Maritime Museum in Macau. Initially, Carvalhal was going to return to Portugal following the end of his term, but decided to stay following the Carnation Revolution and later chose to remain permanently. He continued working in Macau at the maintenance workshop of the Port Authority until his retirement in 1999.

== Football career ==
Carvalhal played youth football for GDR Canas de Senhorim, and later joined the club's senior team, helping them win a district championship. Upon his arrival to Macau, an officer asked if he had ever played football. Despite some people wanting him to join Sporting CP in Portugal, he began playing for the Obra Social dos Serviços de Marinha team, made up mostly of players from Macau and China, and helped them to win several titles, including the Macau Second Division and the Taça de Macau. He later played for Negro Rubro and Lam Ieng, notably playing for Negro Rubro during a tour of the Philippines.

Carvalhal made seven appearances for the Macau national team between 1985 and 1986, scoring twice, with both goals coming in separate matches against Brunei in the first round of 1986 FIFA World Cup qualification. He also served as the Macau national team's captain, and had previously represented the national team in a match against Sporting CP in the late 1970s.

While in Macau, he also played both seven-a-side football and futsal. Following his retirement, he served as the club director of Benfica de Macau.

== Personal life ==
Carvalhal married his wife in 1977, and has three children. Growing up, he was a supporter of Benfica.
