= Li Guoning =

Chinese footballer (born 1942)

Li Guoning 李国宁
Personal information
- Full name: Li Guoning
- Date of birth: 1942 (age 83–84)
- Place of birth: Fuzhou, Fujian, China
- Position: Central midfielder

Youth career
- 1960–1961: Fujian

Senior career*
Years	Team	Apps	(Gls)
1962–1976	Fujian		

International career
1966–1976	China		

Managerial career
- 2009: Guangdong Sunray Cave
Medal record
Men's football
Representing China
AFC Asian Cup
Bronze medal – third place	1976 Iran	Team
- * Club domestic league appearances and goals

Li Guoning
- Simplified Chinese: 李国宁
- Traditional Chinese: 李國寧
Transcriptions
Standard Mandarin
- Hanyu Pinyin: Lǐ guóníng
- Wade–Giles: Lǐ^{1} guó^{1}níng^{2}

Li Guoning (Chinese: 李国宁; pinyin: Lǐ guóníng; born 1942) is a retired Chinese footballer. He played as the main midfielder for his home province of Fujian throughout the 1960s and the 1970s. He also represented China, being the captain for both the 1974 Asian Games as well as the 1976 AFC Asian Cup as the first ever Fujianese player to play internationally.

== Club career ==
Throughout his childhood, Li attended the Fuzhou No. 9 Middle School and studied under footballer He Xinchao who was a famous footballer within Fujian. In 1960, at the age of 18, he was called up to represent Fujian within their youth sector and played within the second division of Chinese football within the Hangzhou Division of Zhejiang. Despite the club only reaching thirteenth place that season, he would continue to gain more experience to where by 1965, he was promoted to the main midfielder for the upcoming 1965 National Games of China. Despite a rather disappointing performance within the group stage at a meager 4th place, Li found substantially more success within the domestic league, finally seeing promotion for the 1966 National Football League. Following his absence throughout the season and harsh weather causing it to be cancelled abruptly, he would return to the club for an additional decade before retiring in 1976.

== International career ==
Despite Fujian reaching promotion in 1966, Li was largely absent for a majority of the season as he was scouted by China manager Nian Weisi to represent the team internationally for the upcoming 1965 Games of the New Emerging Forces. The club were runners-up as despite winning against Palestine, North Vietnam, Yemen and hosts Cambodia, they lost 1–2 against powerhouses North Korea as they went on to win the tournament. Following this, the national team would remain in a state of hiatus until 1970 when he was called up once more as a part of a restructuring of the national team as well as the beginning for China to enter the international stage. This was first seen through his participation in several international friendlies throughout the early 1970s. This was first seen in 1974 for the Asian Games that year as captain of the team. Despite scoring two goals in a 7–1 victory against India, China would remain in the group stage following defeats against Iraq and North Korea.

He was once selected as the only Fujianese player for the upcoming 1976 AFC Asian Cup. During the qualifiers, he scored the only goal against rivals North Korea which secured both their qualification as well as their debut in the Asian Cup following consecutive victories against Brunei, Hong Kong and Japan. Throughout the tournament, China made it into the semi-finals and during a decisive fight against hosts Iran, neither team could score goal and had reached extra time, to which the Chinese Dragons lost 2–0. Despite this, China achieved third place over defeating Iraq in the third-place playoffs.

== Later life ==
Li would later serve as an assistant manager for China as well as its youth sector before moving to Los Angeles in the 1980s. He occasionally returns to China to participate in amateur football in Guangdong. His international teammate Rong Zhixing described him as being "an excellent international player in Chinese football, who has served in the national team for 12 years and has made great contributions to Chinese football". Similarly, other people have described him as being a talented player that was born during an amateur era of Chinese football.
