= Hesham Mustafa =

Iraqi association football player

Personal information
- Full name: Hesham Mustafa
- Date of birth: 1 July 1952 (age 74)
- Place of birth: Iraq
- Position: Midfielder

Senior career*
Years	Team	Apps	(Gls)
- Al-Quwa Al-Jawiya
- Salahaddin FC

International career
1974–1979	Iraq		
- * Club domestic league appearances and goals

Hesham Mustafa (Arabic: هِشَام مُصْطَفَى; born 1 July 1952) is a former Iraqi football midfielder who played for Iraq in the 1976 AFC Asian Cup.

Hesham played for the national team between 1974 and 1979.
