= Li Huajun =

Chinese engineer (born 1962)

- 李华军
- Born: 25 February 1962 (age 64); Guangrao County, Shandong, China
- Education: Shandong University; Dalian University of Technology; Kyoto University
- Scientific career
- Fields: Oceanographic engineering
- Workplaces: Ocean University of China

Chinese name
- Simplified Chinese: 李华军
- Traditional Chinese: 李華軍
Transcriptions
Standard Mandarin
- Hanyu Pinyin: Lǐ Huájūn

Li Huajun (born 25 February 1962) is a Chinese engineer who is a professor and vice president of the Ocean University of China, and an academician of the Chinese Academy of Engineering.

== Biography ==
Li was born in Guangrao County, Shandong, on 25 February 1962. In 1978, he enrolled at Shandong Institute of Technology (now Shandong University), where he majored in power machinery. After graduating in 1982, he became a technician at Guangrao Planter Factory. He did his postgraduate work at Dalian Institute of Technology (now Dalian University of Technology) between August 1983 and July 1986. He received his Doctor of Engineering degree from Kyoto University in 2001.

He joined the Chinese Communist Party in June 1986. In July 1986, he joined the faculty of PLA Navy Submarine Academy, he remained at the university until August 1992, then he moved to Qingdao University of Oceanology (now Ocean University of China), becoming dean of the College of Engineering in March 2001 and vice president in December 2009. He was honored as a Distinguished Young Scholar by the National Science Fund for Distinguished Young Scholars in 2003. He was appointed as a "Chang Jiang Scholar" (or " Yangtze River Scholar") by the Ministry of Education of the People's Republic of China in February 2006.

== Honors and awards ==
- 2006 6th Guanghua Engineering Technology Award
- 2010 State Science and Technology Progress Award (Second Class)
- 2016 Science and Technology Innovation Award of the Ho Leung Ho Lee Foundation
- 27 November 2017 Member of the Chinese Academy of Engineering (CAE)
- 2019 State Science and Technology Progress Award (Second Class)
