= Zhang Xiaowen (footballer) =

Chinese footballer

Zhang Xiaowen 张小文
Personal information
- Date of birth: 15 July 1964 (age 62)
- Place of birth: Xingning, Guangdong China
- Height: 1.78 m (5 ft 10 in)
- Position: Defender

Senior career*
Years	Team	Apps	(Gls)
1983–19??	Guangdong		

International career
1988–1990	China	19	(2)
- * Club domestic league appearances and goals

Zhang Xiaowen (Chinese: 张小文 born 15 July 1964) is a Chinese former international football defender who played for Guangdong throughout his career as well as representing China in the 1988 Olympics and 1988 Asian Cup.

== Playing career ==
Zhang started his career playing for the Guangdong youth football team before being promoted to the team's senior squad in the 1983 league season. After establishing himself as a regular within the team, he was called up to the Chinese national team and played within the 1988 Olympics. While China had a disappointing tournament after being knocked out in the group stages, Zhang was still called up to represent China as he played within the 1988 Asian Cup, where they finished fourth.

== International goals ==
No.	Date	Venue	Opponent	Score	Result	Competition
1.	15 July 1989	Shenyang People's Stadium, Shenyang, China	Iran	2–0	2–0	1990 FIFA World Cup qualification

== Career statistics ==
=== International statistics ===
Year	Competition	Apps	Goal
1989	Friendly	2	0
1988	AFC Asian Cup qualifiers	2	0
1988	Asian Cup	6	1
1989	FIFA World Cup qualification	7	1
Total		19	2
