= Li Zhouzhe =

Chinese footballer

Li Zhouzhe 李宙哲
Personal information
- Full name: Li Zhouzhe
- Date of birth: 1944
- Place of birth: Jixi, China
- Date of death: 2002 (aged 57)
- Place of death: Beijing, China
- Height: 1.68 m (5 ft 6 in)
- Position: Right winger

Senior career*
Years	Team	Apps	(Gls)
1964–1976	Air Force Football Team		

International career
1969–1976	China		

Managerial career
- Bayi
- 1996–1997: Harbin Lange
- * Club domestic league appearances and goals

Li Zhouzhe (Chinese: 李宙哲; pinyin: Lǐ Zhòuzhé; 1944 — 2002) was a Chinese footballer who played as a right winger.

== Playing career ==
In 1964, Li began his senior career with the Air Force Football Team.

In 1969, Li's performances led to him being called-up for China. Li played in both the 1974 Asian Games and the 1976 AFC Asian Cup, scoring a hat-trick against Brunei in a 10–1 victory whilst qualifying for the latter tournament on 19 June 1975.

== Managerial career ==
In 1977, following his retirement from football a year prior, Li began coaching at Bayi, managing the first team, second team and youth teams for a period of 18 years.

In December 1996, Li was appointed head coach of newly formed club Harbin Lange. On 13 May 1997, Li was sacked from Harbin Lange due to poor results.
