= Wang Huiliang =

Chinese footballer

Wang Huiliang 王惠良
Personal information
- Full name: Wang Huiliang
- Date of birth: 5 June 1960 (age 66)
- Place of birth: Meixian, Guangdong, China
- Position: Midfielder

Youth career
- 1974–1979: Guangdong Youth

Senior career*
Years	Team	Apps	(Gls)
1980–1987	Guangdong		

International career
1985–1986	China	3	(1)
- * Club domestic league appearances and goals

Wang Huiliang (Chinese: 王惠良; pinyin: Wáng Huìliáng; born 5 June 1960) is a Chinese former association football player.

== Playing career ==
Wang Huiliang joined Guangdong Youth academy in 1974 and was promoted to Guangdong's first team squad in 1980. He was called up to the China national team in 1985 for the 1986 FIFA World Cup qualification. On 12 May 1985, he made his international debut and scored a goal in a 6–0 victory over Macau. On 19 May 1985, he was the starting left midfielder in a 2–1 defeat against Hong Kong which was known as the 5.19 incident. Wang retired from football in 1987.

== Personal life ==
Wang became a businessman after his retirement. His son, Wang Peng, is a footballer who currently plays for Guangzhou R&F.
