= Li Huayun =

Chinese footballer

Li Huayun 李华筠
Personal information
- Date of birth: 22 September 1963 (age 63)
- Place of birth: Muping, Shandong, China
- Position: Forward

Senior career*
Years	Team	Apps	(Gls)
1981-1988	Liaoning team		

International career
1983–1987	China	25	(7)
Medal record
Men's football
Representing China
AFC Asian Cup
Silver medal – second place	1984 Singapore	Team
AFC Youth Championship
Silver medal – second place	1982 Bangkok	Team
University Games
Bronze medal – third place	1985 Kobe	Football
- * Club domestic league appearances and goals

Li Huayun is a Chinese football forward who played for China in the 1984 Asian Cup. He also played for Liaoning.

== Career statistics ==
=== International statistics ===
Year	Competition	Apps	Goal
1983-1987	Friendly	11	2
1984	Great Wall Cup	1	1
1984	Asian Cup Qualification	4	2
1984	Asian Cup	5	1
1985	FIFA World Cup qualification	4	1
Total		25	7
