= Lin Qiang (footballer) =

Chinese footballer

Lin Qiang 林强
Personal information
- Full name: Lin Qiang
- Date of birth: 13 January 1960 (age 66)
- Place of birth: Wuhan, China
- Position: Left wing

Youth career
- Hubei Youth Football Team
- → Guangdong Youth (loan)

Senior career*
Years	Team	Apps	(Gls)
- Hubei Football Team

International career
1983–1985	China	27	(2)

Managerial career
- Wuhan Police Football Team
- * Club domestic league appearances and goals

Lin Qiang (simplified Chinese: 林强; traditional Chinese: 林強; pinyin: Lín Qiáng; born 13 January 1960) is a former Chinese footballer.

== Club career ==
Born in 1960 in Wuhan, Hubei, Lin joined Hubei Youth Football Team in 1976. During his time playing youth football in Hubei, Lin was "borrowed" by Guangdong Youth for a tour of Japan. Lin later played senior football for Hubei Football Team. Following retirement, Lin joined the police, managing the Wuhan Police Football Team.

== International career ==
On 4 December 1983, Lin made his debut, as a substitute, for China in a 2–1 win against Australia.

=== International goals ===
Scores and results list China's goal tally first.

#	Date	Venue	Opponent	Score	Result	Competition
1	3 November 1984	Workers’ Stadium, Beijing, China	Australia	2–1	3–2	Ampol Cup
2	20 February 1985	Canidrome, Nossa Senhora de Fátima, Macau	Macau	2–0	4–0	1986 FIFA World Cup qualification
