= Ma Lin (footballer) =

Chinese footballer and manager

Ma Lin 马林
Personal information
- Date of birth: July 28, 1962 (age 64)
- Place of birth: Qiqihar, Heilongjiang, China
- Height: 1.76 m (5 ft 9 in)
- Position: Striker

Senior career*
Years	Team	Apps	(Gls)
1982–1994	Liaoning FC		
1992	→ NKK S.C. (loan)		
1995	Dalian Wanda	16	(6)

International career
1984–1990	China	45	(21)

Managerial career
- 1996: Dalian Yiteng (assistant)
- 2000–2003: Liaoning Zhongshun (assistant)
- 2003–2004: Liaoning FC
- 2005: Chongqing Lifan
- 2006: Jiangsu Sainty
- 2008–2013: Liaoning Whowin
- 2014: Dalian Aerbin (caretaker)
- 2015–2017: Liaoning Whowin
- 2017–2018: Dalian Yifang
Medal record
Men's football
Representing China
AFC Asian Cup
Silver medal – second place	1984 Singapore	Team
University Games
Bronze medal – third place	1985 Kobe	Football
- * Club domestic league appearances and goals

Ma Lin (Chinese: 马林; Chinese: 馬林; pinyin: Mǎ Lín; born on July 28, 1962) is a Chinese football manager and a former player.

As a player, he was a striker who represented Liaoning FC where he won six league titles and three Chinese FA Cups as well as the 1989–90 Asian Club Championship. He scored 21 goals in 45 appearances for the China national team. As a manager he gained his first head coach appointment at his former club Liaoning FC. He has since gone on to manage Chongqing Lifan, Jiangsu Sainty and returned to Liaoning FC on two further occasions.

== Playing career ==
Ma Lin was born in Qiqihar, Heilongjiang. He began his football career playing Liaoning FC where he would show excellent ball control, skill and shooting ability as well a threatening heading ability for his height at an early age, which would soon see him win his first league title in the 1985 league season. He was called up to the national team where he was included in the 1986 Asian Games and would establish himself as China's first choice striker throughout the tournament. His international career would see him play in the 1988 AFC Asian Cup, 1988 Summer Olympics and narrowly miss out on qualification for the 1990 FIFA World Cup. In the domestic league Ma Lin with Liaoning FC would dominate the Chinese game where they won several league, cup as well as 1989-90 Asian Club Championship. After winning everything with Liaoning Ma Lin would try his hand in a foreign league and play in the Japan Soccer League with NKK S.C. on loan, however when the loan period was finished he returned to Liaoning until the 1995 league season when he joined Dalian Wanda for one season before retiring as a player.

== Managerial career ==
After he retired Ma Lin would take up coaching where he started off with Dalian Yiteng as an assistant before joining Liaoning once more as one of their assistants. After the team's head coach Dimitar Penev left during the 2003 league season Ma Lin would go on to be promoted as the team's manager where he would lead them to a mid-table sixth-place finish. He would then be given a full season to manage the squad and go on to lead the team to an improved fourth-place finish, however despite this improvement Ma Lin was allowed to leave and was replaced by the experienced coach Wang Hongli. He would take over the management position at Chongqing Lifan at the beginning of the 2005 league season where he was unable to improve the team's fortunes as a lowly club within the top tier and left after one season. He would then take the management position at second tier side Jiangsu Sainty where he unable to aid them in their promotion push and resigned during the league season. After a short period outside management Ma Lin returned to Liaoning after Werner Lorant was sacked and was brought in to help the team in their relegation battle during the 2008 league season. Unable to achieve this the club stuck with Ma Lin and he immediately repaid their loyalty by winning the division title and re-promotion back to the top tier after only one season.

On 26 November 2017 Ma Lin was appointed the new manager at Dalian Yifang. On 20 March 2018, he was relieved of duty as manager of Dalian Yifang and replaced by Bernd Schuster.

== Career statistics ==
No.	Date	Venue	Opponent	Score	Result	Competition
1.	28 February 1989	National Stadium, Bangkok, Thailand	Thailand	2–0	3–0	1990 FIFA World Cup qualification
2.	28 February 1989	National Stadium, Bangkok, Thailand	Thailand	3–0	3–0	1990 FIFA World Cup qualification
3.	4 March 1989	Dhaka Stadium, Dhaka, Bangladesh	Bangladesh	2–0	2–0	1990 FIFA World Cup qualification
4.	22 July 1989	Azadi Stadium, Tehran, Iran	Iran	2–3	2–3	1990 FIFA World Cup qualification
5.	29 July 1989	Shenyang People's Stadium, Shenyang, China	Thailand	2–0	2–0	1990 FIFA World Cup qualification
6.	28 October 1989	National Stadium, Kallang, Singapore	Qatar	1–0	1–2	1990 FIFA World Cup qualification

== Honours ==
=== Player ===
Liaoning FC

- Chinese Jia-A League: 1985, 1987, 1988, 1990, 1991, 1993
- Chinese FA Cup: 1984, 1986
- Asian Club Championship: 1989–1990

=== Manager ===
Liaoning FC

- China League One: 2009
