= Zuo Shusheng =

Chinese footballer

Zuo Shusheng 左树声
Personal information
- Full name: Zuo Shusheng
- Date of birth: 13 April 1958 (age 68)
- Place of birth: Tianjin, China
- Height: 1.76 m (5 ft 9 in)
- Position: Attacking midfielder

Youth career
- 1976–1977: Tianjin City

Senior career*
Years	Team	Apps	(Gls)
1978–1988	Tianjin City		
1988–1989	PEC Zwolle		

International career
1978–1985	China	54	(14)

Managerial career
- 1992: Tianjin City
- 1996–1997: Tianjin Samsung
- 2004–2005: Sinchi FC
- 2008–2009: Tianjin Teda
Medal record
Men's football
Representing China
AFC Asian Cup
Silver medal – second place	1984 Singapore	Team
- * Club domestic league appearances and goals as of December 8, 2011

Zuo Shusheng (Chinese: 左树声; Chinese: 左樹聲; pinyin: Zuǒ Shùshēng; born 13 April 1958 in Tianjin) is a former Chinese international soccer player and manager. As a player, he played for Tianjin City FC (currently known as Tianjin Teda F.C.) and Dutch team FC Zwolle before he retired. As a manager, he returned to his former club in Tianjin where he has twice managed them in his career, with his greatest achievements being taking the club to a fourth-place finish in the 2008 Chinese Super League and a chance to play in the 2009 AFC Champions League for the first time.

== Club career ==
Zuo Shusheng started his football career when he played for Tianjin City (currently known as Tianjin Jinmen Tiger F.C.) in the 1978 league season. With them he helped them win the 1980 as well as the 1983 league title (which they shared with Guangdong Provincial Team in 1983). After begin an integral member of the Tianjin squad for ten years he would be given the opportunity join FC Zwolle of the Netherlands in 1988.

== International career ==
Zuo Shusheng would make his debut against South Korea on 29 December 1978, in an Asian Cup qualifier which China lost 1–0. Despite the defeat he would still be included in the squad that took part in the 1980 AFC Asian Cup and while the tournament saw China play disappointingly Zuo Shusheng would nevertheless start to become an integral member of the Chinese team. By the time of the 1984 AFC Asian Cup arrived Zuo Shusheng would now captain the team to a runners up position, however he retired from international football in 1985 after China lost a crucial 1986 FIFA World Cup qualification game against Hong Kong.

== Management career ==
After he retired Zuo Shusheng was allowed to become the head coach of Tianjin City for a short period when they didn't compete in the 1992 league season. Later he became assistant coach for Tianjin while completing his management training. After finishing his management training Zuo Shusheng would officially become the new head coach of Tianjin Teda when he replaced Lin Xinjiang (蔺新江) in the second half of 1996 league season to help Tianjin fight against relegation from the top tier and he would eventually help them to a respectable eighth in the league. The 1997 league season was to be far more difficult for Zuo Shusheng when Tianjin struggled to get results at the beginning of the season and this led Zuo Shusheng to resign as the head coach during the middle of the league season.

He would join Chengdu Wuniu and Gansu Tianma as a trainer until 2007 when Tianjin Teda would bring back Zuo Shusheng to the club but this time as the head coach of reserve team. Zuo Shusheng would once again return to Tianjin senior team as head coach in 2008 when Jozef Jarabinský was sacked during the 2008 league season. The appointment would see Tianjin quickly move up the table and end the season in fourth place as well as a position within the AFC Champions League for the first time. During the 2009 AFC Champions League Tianjin struggled within the competition while also being unable to improve upon last years final league position, this saw the club replace him with Arie Haan at the beginning of the 2010 league season.

Sporting positions
Preceded by Chi Shangbin	China national football team captain 1983-1985	Succeeded by Jia Xiuquan
