= Rong Zhixing =

Chinese footballer

Rong Zhixing 容志行
Personal information
- Full name: Rong Zhixing
- Date of birth: 30 July 1948 (age 78)
- Place of birth: A ship on the journey from China to India
- Height: 1.71 m (5 ft 7 1/2 in)
- Position: Midfielder

Youth career
- 1964: Guangzhou Youth

Senior career*
Years	Team	Apps	(Gls)
1964–1966	Guangzhou Worker		
1966	Guangzhou team		
1969–1982	Guangdong team		

International career
1972–1982	China	34	(10)
Medal record
Men's football
Representing China
AFC Asian Cup
Bronze medal – third place	1976 Iran	Team
Asian Games
Bronze medal – third place	1978 Bangkok	Football
- * Club domestic league appearances and goals

Rong Zhixing (Chinese: 容志行; born 30 July 1948) is a Chinese retired footballer who played for Guangdong. He represented China PR in the 1976 Asian Cup and qualifying for the 1982 FIFA World Cup.

== Biography ==
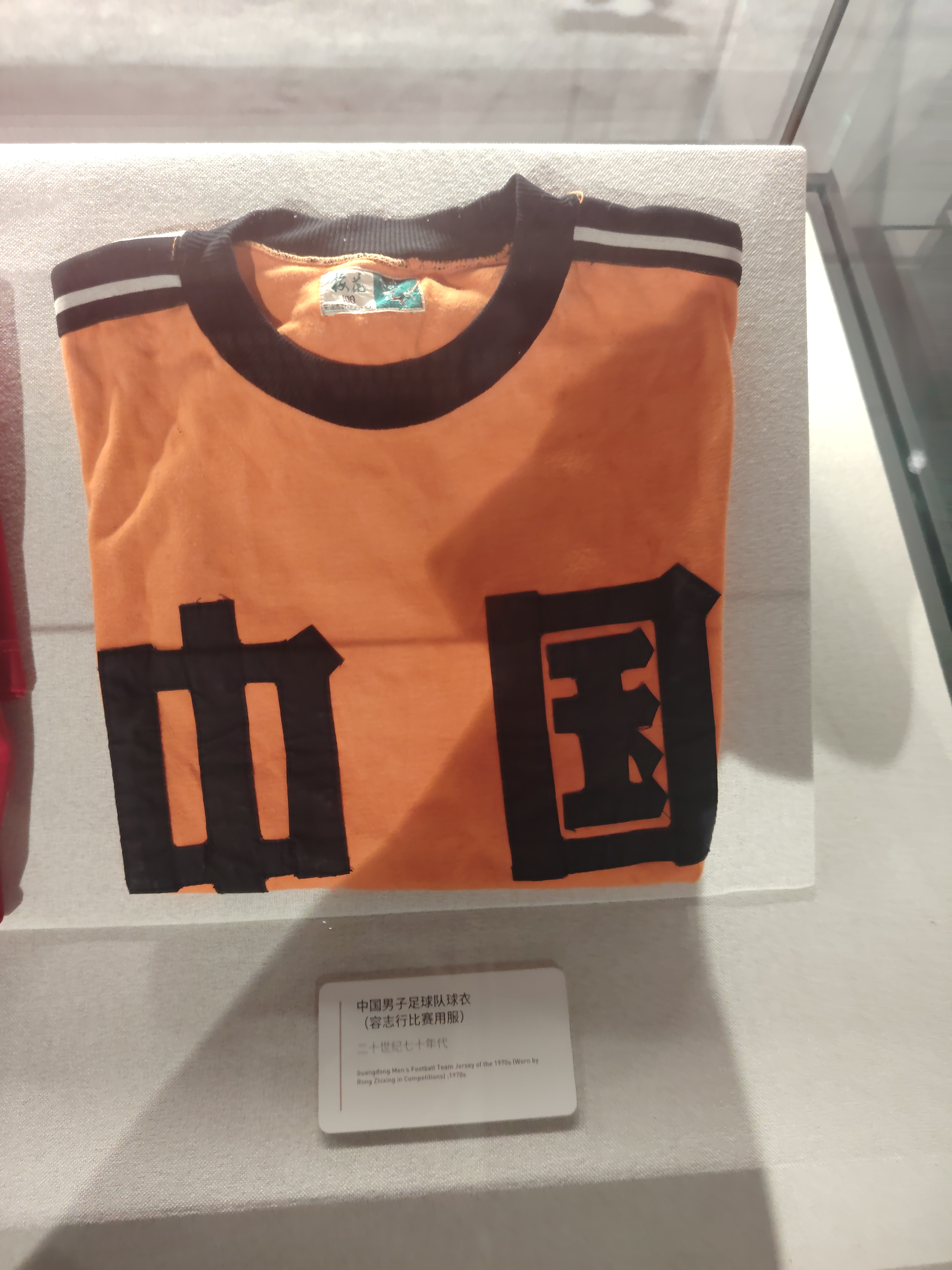
A China national team match-worn by Rong from the 1970s

Rong was born in a ship on the journey from China to India, his family came from Taishan, Guangdong. His family lived in India until 1953, when they returned to China and settled in Guangzhou. Rong started his career playing for the Guangzhou youth football team, after that he was elected to the Guangzhou worker football team. In 1966 Rong join Guangzhou football team. In 1969, Rong was elected to the Guangdong football team, he was called up to the Chinese national team and played in the 1976 Asian Cup, with China earning third place. Rong was still called up to represent China as he played within the 1980 Asian Cup and qualifying for the 1982 FIFA World Cup. After China lost to New Zealand in qualifying for the 1982 FIFA World Cup, Rong retired.

In 1982, Rong retired and studied in university, he worked as the coach of Guangdong youth football team for a short time. After that Rong worked as the vice secretary of party committee of Guangdong province sports technical college. In 1991, Rong worked as the director of the Shenzhen sports committee.

On January 21, 2014, Rong was elected vice chairman of the Chinese Football Association.

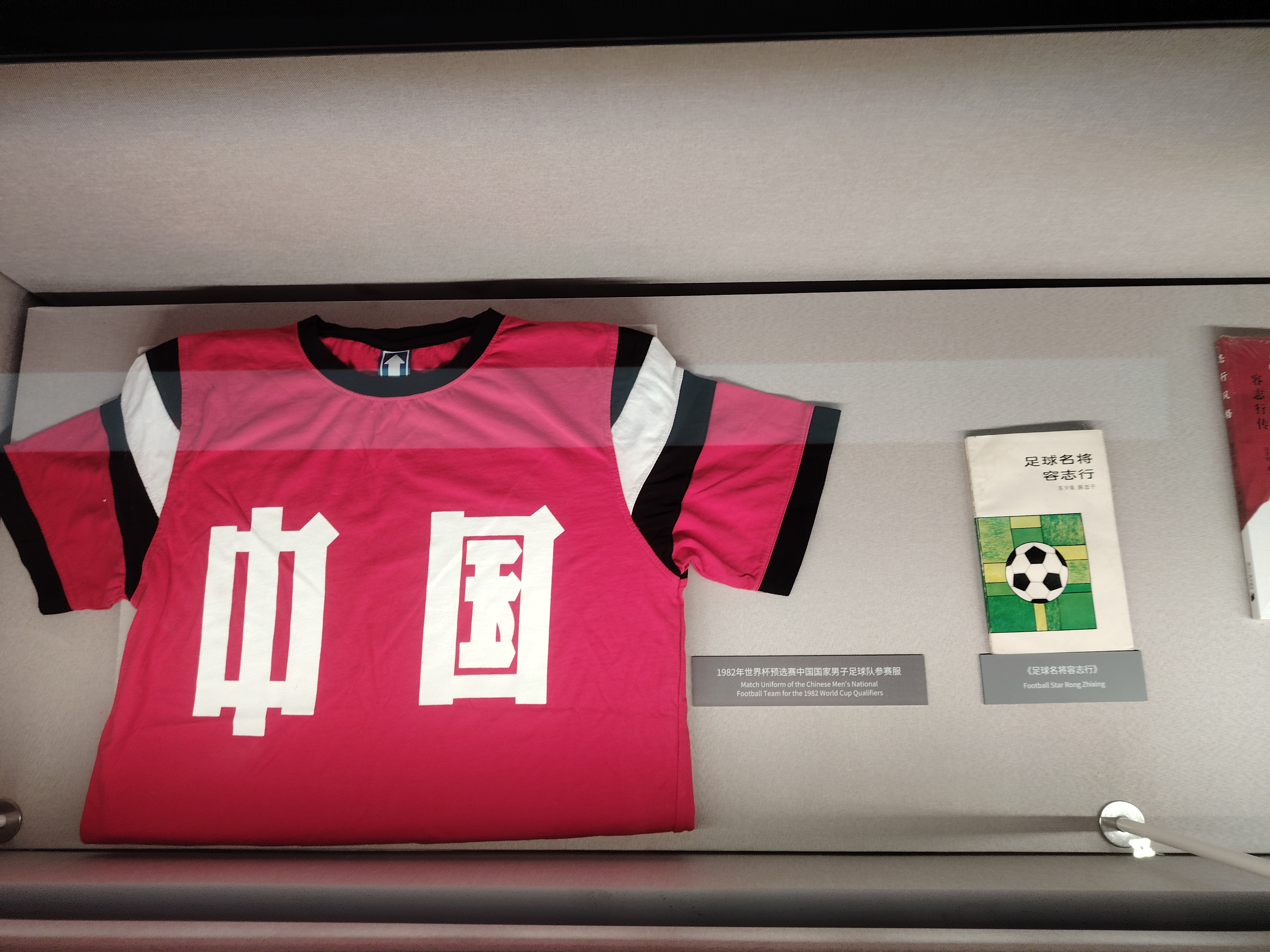
A shirt belonging to Rong from the 1982 FIFA World Cup qualifiers

== Career statistics ==
=== International ===
National team	Year	Apps	Goals
China	1973	1	1
China	1974	0	0
China	1975	5	2
China	1976	4	0
China	1977	2	2
China	1978	8	2
China	1979	0	0
China	1980	4	2
China	1981	7	1
China	1982	3	0
Total		34	10

=== International goals ===
Scores and results list China's goal tally first.

No	Date	Venue	Opponent	Score	Result	Competition
1.	3 August 1973	China	Guinea	—	5–2	Friendly
2.	19 June 1975	Government Stadium, Hong Kong	Brunei	—	10–1	1976 AFC Asian Cup qualification
3.	21 June 1975	Government Stadium, Hong Kong	Hong Kong	1–0	1–0	1976 AFC Asian Cup qualification
4.	19 July 1977	China	Zaire	—	3–2	Friendly
5.	27 July 1977	China	Hong Kong	—	1–2	Friendly
6.	14 December 1978	Thailand	Qatar	—	3–0	Friendly
7.	19 December 1978	Thailand	Malaysia	—	7–1	Friendly
8.	24 December 1980	Government Stadium, Hong Kong	Macau	3–0	3–0	1982 FIFA World Cup qualification
9.	26 December 1980	Government Stadium, Hong Kong	Japan	1–0	1–0	1982 FIFA World Cup qualification
10.	18 October 1981	Workers' Stadium, Beijing, China	Kuwait	1–0	3–0	1982 FIFA World Cup qualification

== Honours ==
Guangdong

- China national league: 1979
