= Wang Jilian =

Chinese footballer

Wang Jilian 王积连
Personal information
- Full name: Wang Jilian
- Date of birth: 15 February 1946
- Place of birth: Dalian, Liaoning, China
- Date of death: 5 June 2016 (aged 70)
- Place of death: Beijing, China
- Height: 1.73 m (5 ft 8 in)
- Position: Forward

Youth career
- Dalian Youth football team

Senior career*
Years	Team	Apps	(Gls)
- Liaoning worker football team
1965–1976	Liaoning team		
1977	Beijing Military Region		
1981	Beijing team		
1985	Beijing worker football team		

International career
1966–1976	China	9	(3)
Medal record
Men's football
Representing China
AFC Asian Cup
Bronze medal – third place	1976 Iran	Team
- * Club domestic league appearances and goals

Wang Jilian (Chinese: 王积连; 15 February 1946 – 5 June 2016) was a Chinese footballer who played for China PR in the 1976 Asian Cup.

== Playing career ==
Wang Jilian was born in Dalian, he began to play football when he was studying in primary school at the age of 8. In 1958, Wang Jilian joined the Dalian youth football team. From 1958 to 1965, Wang Jilian successively played for Dalian youth football, Liaoning worker football team, and Liaoning. In 1965, Wang Jilian represented Liaoning playing in the 1965 National Games of China, in the same year, Wang jilian was called up to China national football team. In 1966, Wang Jilian represented China playing in 1st Games of the New Emerging Forces and got runner-up. in 1974, Wang Jilian represented China to play for the 1974 Asian Games. in 1975, Wang Jilian worked as a player on the Liaoning football team to participate in the 1975 National Games. In 1976, Wang Jilian played for China PR in the 1976 Asian Cup. In the same year Wang Jilian retired and began youth player training work at Beijing Chongwen sport school.

== Football related work ==
Wang Jilian returned to play for the Beijing Military Region football team in a military football match in 1977 for a short time. in 1981, Wang Jilian returned for the second time to play for Beijing in the Chinese Jia League. In 1985, Wang Jilian returned for the third time to play for the Beijing Worker football team in the 2nd national workers games of China.

== Death ==
On June 5, 2016, Wang Jilian died in Beijing, at age 70.
