= Xu Yonglai =

Chinese footballer

Xu Yonglai 徐永来
Personal information
- Full name: Xu Yonglai
- Date of birth: 16 August 1954
- Place of birth: Qingdao, Shandong, China
- Height: 1.78 m (5 ft 10 in)
- Position: Forward

Senior career*
Years	Team	Apps	(Gls)
1971-1983	Shandong Taishan		

International career
1980–1981	China	7	(2)
- * Club domestic league appearances and goals

Xu Yonglai (Chinese: 徐永来; born August 16, 1954) is a Chinese football player who played for China in the 1980 Asian Cup.

== Career statistics ==
=== International statistics ===
Competition	Year	Apps	Goal
Great Wall Cup	1980	1	0
Friendly	1980-1981	2	2
Asian Cup	1980	1	0
World Cup Qualifier	1980-1981	3	0
Total		7	2
