= Li Fubao =

Chinese footballer (1955–2025)

Li Fubao 李福宝
Personal information
- Date of birth: 23 December 1955
- Place of birth: Zhangjiakou, Hebei, China
- Date of death: 23 June 2025 (aged 69)
- Place of death: Foshan, Guangdong, China
- Position: Forward

Senior career*
| Years | Team | Apps | (Gls) |
| 1974–1985 | Hebei | | |
| 1985 | Jiangsu | | |

International career
| 1978–1980 | China | 12 | (6) |
Medal record
Men's football
Representing China
Asian Games
| Bronze medal – third place | 1978 Bangkok | Football |
- * Club domestic league appearances and goals

Li Fubao (23 December 1955 – 23 June 2025) was a Chinese footballer who played as a forward for China in the 1980 Asian Cup. He died on 23 June 2025, at the age of 69.

== Career statistics ==
| Competition | Year | Apps | Goal |
|---|---|---|---|
| Asian Games | 1978 | 7 | 2 |
| Asian Cup Qualifier | 1978 | 2 | 2 |
| Friendly | 1980 | 1 | 1 |
| Great Wall Cup | 1980 | 1 | 0 |
| Asian Cup | 1980 | 1 | 1 |
| Total | | 12 | 6 |
