= Li Hui (footballer) =

Chinese footballer and manager

Personal information
- Full name: Li Hui
- Date of birth: 12 February 1960 (age 66)
- Place of birth: Beijing, China
- Position: Forward

Senior career*
| Years | Team | Apps | (Gls) |
| 1979–1989 | Beijing team | | |
| 1989–1990 | SpVgg Bayreuth | | |

International career
| 1984–1988 | China | 43 | (14) |

Managerial career
- 1990–1993: Beijing team (assistant)
- 1993–1998: Shenzhen Jianlibao (assistant)
- 1999–2000: Beijing Kuanli
- 2000–2003: Yunnan Hongta (assistant)
- 2004: Changchun Yatai
- 2005: Hunan Shoking
Medal record
Men's football
Representing China
AFC Asian Cup
| Silver medal – second place | 1984 Singapore | Team |
- * Club domestic league appearances and goals

Li Hui (Chinese: 李辉; born 12 February 1960) is a Chinese football manager and former player. In his playing career, he was a forward and spent the majority of his career with Beijing FC before ending it with German club SpVgg Bayreuth. He also represented his country in the 1984 Asian Cup, where China became runners-up.

== International statistics ==
| Competition | Year | Apps | Goal |
|---|---|---|---|
| Friendly | 1984-1987 | 15 | 3 |
| Great Wall Cup | 1984 | 3 | 3 |
| Asian Cup Qualifier | 1984-1988 | 7 | 3 |
| Asian Cup | 1984 | 6 | 0 |
| World Cup Qualifier | 1985 | 6 | 3 |
| Asian Games | 1986 | 4 | 2 |
| Total | | 43 | 14 |

== International goals ==
| No. | Date | Venue | Opponent | Score | Result | Competition |
|---|---|---|---|---|---|---|
| 1. | 21 June 1984 | Beijing, China | India | 2–0 | 2–0 | Friendly |
| 2. | 12 September 1984 | Guangzhou, China | Afghanistan | ?–0 | 6–0 | 1984 AFC Asian Cup qualification |
| 3. | 12 September 1984 | Guangzhou, China | Afghanistan | ?–0 | 6–0 | 1984 AFC Asian Cup qualification |
| 4. | 15 September 1984 | Guangzhou, China | Jordan | ?–0 | 6–0 | 1984 AFC Asian Cup qualification |
| 5. | 26 February 1985 | Nossa Senhora de Fátima, Macau | Brunei | 3–0 | 8–0 | 1986 FIFA World Cup qualification |
| 6. | 12 May 1985 | Beijing, China | Macau | 2–0 | 6–0 | 1986 FIFA World Cup qualification |
| 7. | 19 May 1985 | Beijing, China | Hong Kong | 1–1 | 1–2 | 1986 FIFA World Cup qualification |
| 8. | 28 May 1986 | Beijing, China | Iran | ?–? | 2–1 | Friendly |
| 9. | 28 August 1986 | Singapore | Malaysia | 4–0 | 4–0 | 1986 Merlion Cup |
| 10. | 1 September 1986 | Singapore | Singapore | 3–0 | 3–0 | 1986 Merlion Cup |
| 11. | 28 September 1986 | Seoul, South Korea | South Korea | 1–1 | 2–4 | 1986 Asian Games |
| 12. | 28 September 1986 | Seoul, South Korea | South Korea | 2–4 | 2–4 | 1986 Asian Games |

== Honours ==
=== Player ===
Beijing

- Chinese National League: 1982, 1984
