= Liu Haiguang =

Chinese footballer

Liu Haiguang 柳海光
Personal information
- Date of birth: 11 July 1963 (age 63)
- Place of birth: Shanghai, China
- Height: 1.86 m (6 ft 1 in)
- Position: Striker

Youth career
- 1974–1981: Shanghai Team

Senior career*
| Years | Team | Apps | (Gls) |
| 1982–1987 | Shanghai Team | | |
| 1988 | Partizan | 6 | (3) |
| 1989–1991 | Shanghai Team | | |

International career
| 1983–1990 | China | 58 | (20) |
Medal record
Men's football
Representing China
AFC Asian Cup
| Silver medal – second place | 1984 Singapore | Team |
AFC Youth Championship
| Silver medal – second place | 1982 Bangkok | Team |
University Games
| Bronze medal – third place | 1985 Kobe | Football |
- * Club domestic league appearances and goals

Liu Haiguang (Chinese: 柳海光; pinyin: Liǔ Hǎiguāng; born 11 July 1963) is a Chinese former international footballer who spent the majority of his career playing for the Shanghai Team, however he gained distinction when he joined Yugoslav club Partizan along with Jia Xiuquan making them one of the earliest Chinese footballers to play in Europe.

== Biography ==
Liu Haiguang started his youth career with the Shanghai Team and would soon break into the China under-20 national team where he took part in the 1983 FIFA World Youth Championship where he scored one goal as China were knocked-out in the group stages. He would soon become a regular for Shanghai and also be promoted to the Chinese senior team where he was included in the squad for the 1984 AFC Asian Cup, which saw China finish runners-up. After establishing himself as a regular for the national team he along with fellow international team mate Jia Xiuquan would join Yugoslav club Partizan and together be one of the earliest Chinese footballers to play in a European club. Liu stayed for two seasons playing in the Yugoslav First League where he won the 1988–89 Yugoslav Cup before soon returning to Shanghai.

On the international stage he represented China at the 1988 AFC Asian Cup and in the 1988 Summer Olympics. When he decided to retire from international football he had scored 36 goals for China national team making him their top goalscorer. This record would however be broken by Hao Haidong several years later and as of 2024, Liu is the third highest goalscorer.

He retired completely from playing in 1991 and since then has become a businessman and founded four children football clubs.

== Career statistics ==
| No. | Date | Venue | Opponent | Score | Result | Competition |
|---|---|---|---|---|---|---|
| 1. | 15 July 1989 | Shenyang People's Stadium, Shenyang, China | Iran | 1–0 | 2–0 | 1990 FIFA World Cup qualification |

== Honours ==
Partizan

- Yugoslav Cup: 1988–89

Shanghai Team

- Chinese FA Cup: 1991
