= Zhao Dayu =

Footballer (1961–2015)

Zhao Dayu 赵达裕
Personal information
- Date of birth: 17 January 1961
- Place of birth: Guangzhou, Guangdong, China
- Date of death: 18 March 2015 (aged 54)
- Place of death: Guangzhou, Guangdong, China
- Height: 1.62 m (5 ft 4 in)
- Position: Forward

Senior career*
Years	Team	Apps	(Gls)
1978–1986	Guangzhou team		
1988–1990	Mitsubishi Motors		

International career
1982–1986	China	29	(19)

Managerial career
- 1988: Mitsubishi Motors Youth
- 1999: Guangzhou Apollo
Medal record
Men's football
Representing China
AFC Asian Cup
Silver medal – second place	1984 Singapore	Team
- * Club domestic league appearances and goals

Zhao Dayu
- Simplified Chinese: 赵达裕
Transcriptions
Standard Mandarin
- Hanyu Pinyin: Zhào Dáyù
- IPA: [ʈʂâʊ tǎ ŷ]
Yue: Cantonese
- Jyutping: Ziu6 Daat6-jyu6
- IPA: [tsiw˨ tat̚˨ jy˨]

Zhao Dayu (simplified Chinese: 赵达裕; traditional Chinese: 趙達裕; pinyin: Zhào Dáyù; 17 January 1961 – 18 March 2015), also known as Tatsuyu Matsuki (松木 達裕, Matsuki Tatsuyu), was a Chinese coach, businessman and a former international football striker. He was a naturalized citizen of Japan.

As a footballer he played his whole career for Guangzhou team, where he was Nicknamed "Dwarf Tiger" because of his short sature, while internationally he was called up to the Chinese national team, where he took part in the 1984 Asian Cup. He had to retire early in 1986 due to injury and moved to Japan to become the coach of Mitsubishi Motors youth team in 1988. Zhao had a brief stint at senior management with Guangzhou F.C. before concentrating on football youth development by starting up his own school named Guangzhou Yida in his hometown while outside football he moved into sportswear manufacturing with a company called Ucan.

== Playing career ==
Zhao Dayu studied within the specialist sport schools within Guangzhou before being picked up by Guangzhou team, where he showed himself to be a technically gifted player before going on to break into the senior team and soon help guide the club to win promotion to the top tier when the club won the 1981 division title. Zhao's performances for his club soon saw him called up to the Chinese national team, and he soon gained national attention when he scored the winning goal against Argentina in the 1984 Nehru Cup. While the Nehru Cup was a friendly competition Zhao showed what he was capable of when he played in 1984 Asian Cup and helped guide China to a runner-up position within the tournament. It turned out to be the highlight of his career, and in 1986 he had to retire after he was unable to overcome a persistent tibia and fibula fracture in his left leg.

In 1988, Zhao moved to Japan to become the coach of Mitsubishi Motors youth team and spent several years with his wife and family living in Japan. He switched nationality from China to Japan and changed his name as Tatsuyu Matsuki (松木達裕) before returning to China in 1998. He then had a brief stint with senior management when he returned to Guangzhou F.C. in 1999 as their head coach; however, it has been in youth development where Zhao has concentrated on when he formed a football school named Guangzhou Yida in his hometown of Guangzhou. He is also the owner of a sportswear company named Ucan which had secured a kit sponsorship deal with China League One club Guangdong Sunray Cave.

On 18 March 2015, Zhao died of liver cancer at Sun Yat-sen University Cancer Center in Guangzhou, aged 54.

== Career statistics ==
=== International statistics ===
Competition	Year	Apps	Goal
Great Wall Cup	1982–1984	5	1
Friendly	1984–1986	9	4
Asian Cup Qualifier	1984	4	6
Asian Cup	1984	6	2
World Cup Qualifier	1985	5	6
Total		29	19
