= Jia Xiuquan =

Chinese footballer and manager

Jia Xiuquan 贾秀全
Personal information
- Date of birth: 9 November 1963 (age 63)
- Place of birth: Dalian, Liaoning, China
- Height: 1.82 m (6 ft 0 in)
- Position: Defender

Senior career*
Years	Team	Apps	(Gls)
1976–1987	Bayi		
1988	Partizan	16	(0)
1990–1991	PDRM		
1992–1993	Gamba Osaka	25	(0)

International career
1983–1992	China	55	(9)

Managerial career
- 1994–1995: Bayi
- 1996–1998: Shaanxi Guoli
- 1999: China U17
- 2000: Shanghai Shenhua (trainer)
- 2001–2002: Bayi
- 2003–2004: China U23
- 2004: Shanghai Shenhua (interim)
- 2005–2007: China U23
- 2008: Henan Jianye
- 2008–2009: Shanghai Shenhua
- 2014–2017: Henan Jianye
- 2017: China U20
- 2018–2021: China Women
- 2025: Changchun Dazhong Zhuoyue
Medal record
Representing China
Men's football
AFC Asian Cup
Silver medal – second place	1984 Singapore	Team
Bronze medal – third place	1992 Japan	Team
AFC Youth Championship
Silver medal – second place	1982 Bangkok	Team
- * Club domestic league appearances and goals

Jia Xiuquan (simplified Chinese: 贾秀全; traditional Chinese: 賈秀全; pinyin: Jiǎ Xiùquán; born 9 November 1963) is a Chinese football manager and former international player.

== Club career ==
As a player, Jia Xiuquan predominately played the majority of his career for Bayi Football Team. During his time at Bayi, he saw them win two league titles, his first title in 1981 and his second in the 1986 league season. He would also personally win the Chinese Football Association Golden Ball award in 1983, 1984 and 1986. After achieving these honours he was one of the first Chinese players to attract interest from foreign teams. Jia would eventually transfer to Yugoslav First League team FK Partizan where he moved in 1988 together with Liu Haiguang. They were among the pioneers among Chinese players in Europe, as by then, only Xie Yuxin and Gu Guangming, playing with FC Zwolle (Netherlands) and SV Darmstadt 98 (Germany) respectively, had been playing in Europe since 1987.

Jia and Liu came to Belgrade during the winter break of the 1987–88 season. Jia played 10 matches in the league during the second half of the 1987–88 season, with Partizan finishing second that season one point behind their eternal rivals Red Star. He played one of the matches On 26 October 1988, Jia played in the 1988–89 UEFA Cup second round first leg against Italian giants AS Roma, coming on as a substitute for Fadil Vokrri in the 46th minute, which made him the first Chinese footballer to play in the UEFA Cup. Partizan beat Roma 4–2 at home, but later they lost 0–2 in Italian capital, making it an away-goals loss. That domestic season, the 1988–89 Yugoslav First League, the league had a surprising winner, FK Vojvodina, with Partizan finishing in a disappointing 6th position, however the club compensated by winning the Yugoslav Cup that year, with Jia playing in two Cup matches. In the league that season Jia played 6 matches. In total, along with the 11 friendlies where he scored one goal, with Partizan Jia played a total of 34 matches having scored one goal.

Afterward Jia will move to Malaysian club Malaysia Royal Police FA. He was invited to Japanese outfit Sanfrecce Hiroshima by Kazuo Imanishi in 1992; however, he chose Matsushita Electric at the recommendation of club's assistant coach Chi Shangbin. He played in the 1991–92 Japan Soccer League with the club finishing in 5th place at the end of the season. Jia played with Gamba Osaka in the inaugural season of the J.League in 1993 and he made 25 league appearances during that season, with Gamba Osaka finishing in 7th place. Jia was the first ever Chinese player to play in the J.League.

== International career ==
In 1982, he would make his debut for the China national team, however he would rise to prominence in the 1984 AFC Asian Cup where China finished runners up and Jia was personally named as the Asian Cup Most Valuable Player. A constant regular within the team Jia would captain the team from 1987 until 1992 where he led China in an unsuccessful FIFA World Cup qualifying campaign as well as the 1988 and 1992 AFC Asian Cup, eventually achieving 55 caps for his country. He was also part of the Chinese team at the 1988 Summer Olympics.

== Managerial career ==
=== Early management career ===
After he retired, Bayi Football Team offered Jia a chance to rejoin them and coach them for a short period, however his presence within the team was unable to lift them from a spending much of the season near the bottom of the league. With Shaanxi Guoli, Jia managed a newly formed team starting at the bottom of the Chinese league system and would lead them to promotion to the second tier in the 1997 league season. This caught the attention of the Chinese Football Association and offered him the China U17, however his reign with them was uninspired and the team were unable to qualify for any major tournaments.

=== Chinese youth teams ===
In 2000 Shanghai Shenhua were willing to give Jia a chance to join them as a trainer before Bayi asked Jia to join them again. Once again he spent much of his time trying to keep Bayi in the top tier of the league system. However, despite achieving this he left them at the end of the 2002 league season where they finished a disappointing 13th. Jia would later accept a position for the China U23 however this was short lived and he resigned in February 2004. Once again he took another training position with Shanghai but because English Head Coach Howard Wilkinson resigned before the start of the beginning of the league season Jia acted as the head coach through the majority of the season, Shanghai ultimately ended the season finishing 10th. In 2005 Jia returned to the Chinese under-23 team as a permanent manager to compete for the Football at the 2008 Summer Olympics – Men's tournament.

=== Shanghai Shenhua ===
At the beginning of the 2008 league season Henan Jianye offered Jia the chance to manage them in the top tier, Jia took this position but had a poor start to the season and was replaced with Acácio Casimiro. In September 2008 Jia was again offered the chance to manage Shanghai Shenhua, this time on a permanent basis and took Shanghai to second in the league. At the end of the 2009 Jia was dismissed by the club again after a disappointing season with the team ranking 5th. Later he was reported to be arrested for receiving bribes during his stint at Chinese youth team.

=== Allegations of match-fixing ===
On 20 January 2010, Jia was arrested and questioned on allegations of match-fixing during his tenures with Shaanxi Guoli and the Chinese youth teams. His character would be questioned by the Chinese media and old stories about his coaching abilities, his cozy relationship with the Chinese FA, criticisms from former players and staff as well as his willingness to allow Shanghai Shenhua's chairman Zhu Jun's to interference on team management would all be recycled during his arrest. On 21 January 2010 Chinese FA member Yang Yimin was also arrested on allegations of match-fixing. The allegations against each men would expose an extremely close friendship between Jia and Yang Yimin especially during their time working with each other with the Chinese youth teams. On 4 March 2010, Jia was released from prison and had all allegations against him dropped. Yang Yimin would later be found guilty for his involvement in a match-fixing ring that saw him sentenced to 10 years in prison on 18 February 2012.

=== Henan Jianye ===
On 2 June 2014, Jia was appointed as the new manager of Henan Jianye.

=== Women Football Coaching ===
In May 2018, Jia was appointed as the head coach of China women's national football team. Jia left his position in 2021 after the 2020 Olympics.

In August 2025, Jia moved to Chinese Women's Super League club Changchun Dazhong Zhuoyue as the head coach.

== Career statistics ==
=== Club ===
Appearances and goals by club, season and competition
Club	Season	League			National cup (Note: Includes Yugoslav Cup, Emperor's Cup)		League cup (Note: Includes J.League Cup)		Continental		Total	
Club	Season	Division	Apps	Goals	Apps	Goals	Apps	Goals	Apps	Goals	Apps	Goals
Partizan	1987–88	Yugoslav First League	10	0	0	0	—		0	0	10	0
Partizan	1988–89	Yugoslav First League	6	0	2	0	—		1	0	9	0
Partizan	Total		16	0	2	0	—		1	0	19	0
Gamba Osaka	1992	J1 League	—				7	0	—		7	0
Gamba Osaka	1993	J1 League	25	0	0	0	2	0	—		27	0
Gamba Osaka	Total		25	0	0	0	9	0	—		34	0

=== International ===
Appearances and goals by national team and year
National team	Year	Apps	Goals
China PR	1983	1	0
China PR	1984	14	4
China PR	1985	8	1
China PR	1986	11	0
China PR	1987	1	1
China PR	1988	1	0
China PR	1989	11	1
China PR	1990	0	0
China PR	1991	0	0
China PR	1992	3	0
Total		50	7

No.	Date	Venue	Opponent	Score	Result	Competition
2.	5 December 1984	Kallang, Singapore	Singapore	1–0	2–0	1984 AFC Asian Cup
3.	9 December 1984	Kallang, Singapore	India	3–0	3–0	1984 AFC Asian Cup
4.	11 December 1984	Kallang, Singapore	United Arab Emirates	2–0	5–0	1984 AFC Asian Cup
5.	12 May 1985	Beijing, China	Macau	1–0	6–0	1986 FIFA World Cup qualification
7.	29 July 1989	Shenyang, China	Thailand	1–0	2–0	1990 FIFA World Cup qualification

== Honours ==
Bayi

- National League Division 1: 1981, 1986

Partizan

- Yugoslav Cup: 1988–89

China

- 1984 AFC Asian Cup: Silver Medal

Individual

- Chinese Jia-A League Golden Ball: 1983, 1984, 1986
- AFC Asian Cup MVP: 1984
- AFC Asian Cup top scorer: 1984
