= Chi Shangbin =

Chinese footballer and coach (1949–2021)

Chi Shangbin 迟尚斌
Personal information
- Full name: Chi Shangbin
- Date of birth: 19 September 1949
- Place of birth: Dalian, Liaoning, China
- Date of death: 6 March 2021 (aged 71)
- Place of death: Dalian, Liaoning, China
- Height: 1.76 m (5 ft 9 in)
- Position: Midfielder

Senior career*
Years	Team	Apps	(Gls)
1969–1982	Liaoning Team		

International career
1974–1982	China	58	(11)

Managerial career
- 1985–1986: Beijing Army (assistant)
- 1987–1995: Gamba Osaka (assistant)
- 1995–1997: Dalian Wanda
- 1997: China (assistant)
- 1998: Sichuan Quanxing
- 1999–2000: Xiamen Yuanhua
- 2000–2002: China (assistant)
- 2003: Henan Jianye
- 2004: Jiangsu Sainty
- 2005: Shenzhen Jianlibao
- 2009–2010: Dalian Aerbin
- 2010–2011: Dalian Aerbin (assistant)
Medal record
Men's football
Representing China
AFC Asian Cup
Bronze medal – third place	1976 Iran	Team
Asian Games
Bronze medal – third place	1978 Bangkok	Football
- * Club domestic league appearances and goals

Chi Shangbin (Chinese: 迟尚斌; pinyin: Chí Shàngbīn; 19 September 1949 – 6 March 2021) was a Chinese football player and coach.

As player, he spent his whole career playing for Liaoning, and also represented China at international level. As manager, he was best known for his record at Dalian Wanda of 55 unbeaten run between 1995 and 1997 in the league, which brought him two Chinese Jia-A League titles.

== Playing career ==
Chi Shangbin played for the Liaoning during his entire senior football career. He was called up by the China national football team since the 1970s, and took part in the AFC Asian Cup in 1976 and 1980, as well as the Asian Games in 1974, 1978 and 1982.

== Managerial career ==
=== Earlier stages ===
After his retirement, Chi became an assistant manager at Beijing Army until 1987. He sought further study at Osaka University of Health and Sport Sciences, and was offered a chance to be the youth manager at Panasonic Gamba until 1995.

=== Dalian Wanda ===
In 1995, Chi returned to China to join the Jia-A league champion Dalian Wanda. The defending champion did not start well in the 1995 league, but continued their reigning performance under Chi's management. From 3 September 1995 until 18 December 1997, Dalian Wanda had an unbeaten run of 55 consecutive matches, which included an undefeated 1996 season. He won the 1996 and 1997 league titles, and was awarded Coach of the year in both seasons. He left Dalian Wanda after the 1997 season.

=== Sichuan Quanxing and second-tier experiences ===
In 1998, Chi briefly joined Sichuan Quanxing.

He then joined second tier club Xiamen Yuanhua in 1999, where he won a second-tier league title.

In 2000, Chi was appointed by the China national football team as part of the coaching staff for Bora Milutinović.

In 2003, Chi joined Henan Jianye, also in the Jia-B league. The team finished the season as runner-up.

In 2004, he joined Jiangsu Sainty.

=== Shenzhen Jianlibao ===
Chi joined reigning league champion Shenzhen Jianlibao in 2005 to replace Zhu Guanghu, who left for the Chinese national team. The team fell from grace and finished in 12th place in a difficult season. Chi resigned after only three months due to his poor relationship with the squad, especially with then-captain Li Weifeng and senior players like Li Yi and Yang Chen. Chi was unhappy due to the senior players' influential control over the team, their unprofessional behavior and discipline especially with gambling. He tried to regain control of the squad with his strictness, but most of the players reacted fiercely by training and playing even more poorly. Li Weifeng punched Chi's office window; Yang Chen, who is already a relatively gentle person got upset too and repeatedly exposed the uselessness of Chi's policy to media, which saw the then owner Yang Saixin having to let Chi go.

=== Dalian Aerbin ===
In July 2009, Chi Shangbin was appointed by newly founded Dalian Aerbin as manager. Under his leadership Dalian Aerbin won the 2010 China League Two, and they were promoted into the China League One. He stepped out of the coaching staff to work as vice general manager since 2012, then general manager in 2013, and left the team in 2015.

== Personal life ==
Chi focused on youth training activities since 2015. He died of myocardial infarction on 6 March 2021. FIFA chairman Gianni Infantino paid tribute to him.

== Honours ==
=== Player ===
Liaoning Team

- China national league: 1978

=== Manager ===
Dalian Wanda

- Chinese Jia-A League: 1996, 1997

Xiamen Yuanhua

- Chinese Jia-B League: 1999

Dalian Aerbin

- China League Two: 2010

=== Individual ===
- Asian Coach of the Month: March 1997, December 1997
