= North Korea national football team results (1980–1999) =

This article provides details of international football games played by the North Korea national football team from 1980 to 1999.

After a 3–0 loss to South Korea in 1993, chairman Kim Jong-il banned the national team from competing in international tournaments. They did not return to competitive football until 1998.

== International matches ==
=== 1980 ===
25 February 1980 Summer Olympics qualification	Iran	0–0	North Korea	Kallang, Singapore
		Report		Stadium: National Stadium

28 February 1980 Summer Olympics qualification	North Korea	7–0	Sri Lanka	Kallang, Singapore
		Report		Stadium: National Stadium

2 March 1980 Summer Olympics qualification	China	1–1	North Korea	Kallang, Singapore
		Report		Stadium: National Stadium

4 March 1980 Summer Olympics qualification	Singapore	3–1	North Korea	Kallang, Singapore
		Report		Stadium: National Stadium

10 March 1980 Summer Olympics qualification	North Korea	2–1	India	Kallang, Singapore
		Report		Stadium: National Stadium

16 September 1980 AFC Asian Cup	North Korea	3–2	Bangladesh	Kuwait City, Kuwait
	Choi Jae-pil 44', 45'; Kim Jong-man 88'	Report	Salahuddin 60' (pen.); Chunnu 90'	Stadium: Sabah Al Salem Stadium

18 September 1980 AFC Asian Cup	North Korea	2–1	China	Kuwait City, Kuwait
	Kim Bok-man 20' (?)	Report	Li Fubao 7'	Stadium: Sabah Al Salem Stadium

24 September 1980 AFC Asian Cup	Iran	3–2	North Korea	Kuwait City, Kuwait
	Alidoosti 27'; Danaeifard 57'; Fariba 60'	Report	Hwang Sang-hoi 58'; Pak Jong-hun 90'	Stadium: Sabah Al Salem Stadium; Attendance: 4,000; Referee: Enrique Mendoza (Mexico)

26 September 1980 AFC Asian Cup	North Korea	2–1	Syria	Kuwait City, Kuwait
	Kim Gwan-mo; Kim Gwang-un	Report	Suleiman	Stadium: Sabah Al Salem Stadium

28 September 1980 AFC Asian Cup	South Korea	2–1	North Korea	Kuwait City, Kuwait
	Chung Hae-won 80', 89'	Report	Pak Jong-hun 19' (pen.)	Stadium: Sabah Al Salem Stadium; Attendance: 20,000; Referee: Toshikazu Sano (Japan)

29 September 1980 AFC Asian Cup	Iran	3–0	North Korea	Kuwait City, Kuwait
	Fariba 49'; Faraki 66', 76'	Report		Stadium: Sabah Al Salem Stadium; Attendance: 10,000; Referee: Enrique Mendoza (Mexico)

22 December 1982 FIFA World Cup qualification	North Korea	3–0	Macau	Causeway Bay, Hong Kong
	Li Yong-sob 34'; Li Chang-ha 41'; Kim Yong-nam 87'	Report		Stadium: Government Stadium; Attendance: 3,730; Referee: Sarkis Demirdjian (Lebanon)

26 December 1982 FIFA World Cup qualification	North Korea	1–0	Singapore	Causeway Bay, Hong Kong
	Li Yong-sob 7'	Report		Stadium: Government Stadium; Attendance: 16,900; Referee: Ibrahim Youssef Al-Doy (Bahrain)

28 December 1982 FIFA World Cup qualification	Hong Kong	2–2	North Korea	Causeway Bay, Hong Kong
	Wan Chi Keung 40'; Wu Kwok Hung 62'	Report	Li Yong-man 3'; Li Yong-sob 25'	Stadium: Government Stadium; Attendance: 27,629; Referee: Sarkis Demirdjian (Lebanon)

30 December 1982 FIFA World Cup qualification	North Korea	1–0 (a.e.t.)	Japan	Causeway Bay, Hong Kong
	Kim Yong-nam 114'	Report		Stadium: Government Stadium; Attendance: 8,266; Referee: Ali Al-Bannai (Kuwait)

=== 1981 ===
4 January 1982 FIFA World Cup qualification	China	4–2 (a.e.t.)	North Korea	Causeway Bay, Hong Kong
	Huang Xiangdong 44', 110'; Chen Xirong 55'; Gu Guangming 112'	Report	Li Chang-ha 2'; Kim Yong-nam 56'	Stadium: Government Stadium; Attendance: 15,974; Referee: Ibrahim Youssef Al-Doy (Bahrain)

28 September Pyongyang International Tournament	North Korea	2–0	India	Pyongyang, North Korea
		Report		Stadium: Hamhung Stadium

=== 1982 ===
6 March Friendly	Iran	2–0	North Korea	Teheran, Iran
		Report		Stadium: Azadi Stadium

20 November 1982 Asian Games	North Korea	1–1	Syria	New Delhi, India
	Jang Bong-yong 21'	Report	Khalil 86'	Stadium: Ambedkar Stadium

22 November 1982 Asian Games	North Korea	3–0	Thailand	New Delhi, India
	Han Hyong-il 28', 56', 82'	Report		Stadium: Jawaharlal Nehru Stadium

24 November 1982 Asian Games	North Korea	2–2	Saudi Arabia	New Delhi, India
	Kim Jong-man 33'; Hwang Sang-hoi 40'	Report	Bayazid 11'; Abdulshaker 13'	Stadium: Chhatrasal Stadium

27 November 1982 Asian Games	North Korea	1–0	China	New Delhi, India
	Kim Jong-man 58'	Report		Stadium: Jawaharlal Nehru Stadium

30 November 1982 Asian Games	North Korea	2–3 (a.e.t.)	Kuwait	New Delhi, India
	Kim Jong-man 76'; Kim Won-chol 112'	Report	Juma'a 82' (pen.); Al-Haddad 102'; Al-Anberi 104'	Stadium: Jawaharlal Nehru Stadium; Referee: Vijit Getkaew (Thailand)

2 December 1982 Asian Games	North Korea	0–2; Awarded (Note: Saudi Arabia were awarded a 2–0 win after the North Korean team assaulted referee Vijit Getkaew and his linesman after the final whistle of the semi-final against Kuwait)	Saudi Arabia	New Delhi, India
		Report		Stadium: Jawaharlal Nehru Stadium

=== 1985 ===
19 January 1986 FIFA World Cup qualification	Singapore	1–1	North Korea	Kallang, Singapore
	Au-yeong Pak Kuan (pen.)	Report	Yu Song-chul (pen.)	Stadium: National Stadium; Attendance: 12,000; Referee: Hardjowasito Sudarso (Indonesia)

5 February Friendly	Iran	1–0	North Korea	Mashhad, Iran
		Report		Stadium: Imam Reza Stadium

21 March 1986 FIFA World Cup qualification	Japan	1–0	North Korea	Tokyo, Japan
	Hara 20'	Report		Stadium: Yoyogi National Gymnasium; Attendance: 25,000; Referee: Timothy Joseph (Malaysia)

30 April 1986 FIFA World Cup qualification	North Korea	0–0	Japan	Pyongyang, North Korea
		Report		Stadium: Kim Il-sung Stadium; Attendance: 52,500; Referee: Samuel Chan Yam-Ming (Hong Kong)

25 May 1986 FIFA World Cup qualification	North Korea	2–0	Singapore	Nampo, North Korea
	Yun Jong-su 25'; Han Hyong-il 55'	Report		Stadium: Nampo Stadium; Attendance: 25,000; Referee: Sukho Vuddhijoti (Thailand)

12 July Friendly	Syria	2–2	North Korea	Damascus, Syria
		Report

=== 1986 ===
30 April Friendly	Bulgaria	3–0	North Korea	Sofia, Bulgaria
	Dragolov 14'; Markov 26', 42'	Report		Stadium: Stadion Georgi Asparuhov; Attendance: 3,000

24 August 1986 Merlion Cup	China	0–0	North Korea	Kallang, Singapore
		Report		Stadium: National Stadium

27 August 1986 Merlion Cup	Canada	0–0	North Korea	Kallang, Singapore
		Report		Stadium: National Stadium

30 August 1986 Merlion Cup	Singapore	0–2	North Korea	Kallang, Singapore
		Report	Kim Chang-bok 44'; Yun Jong-su 57'	Stadium: National Stadium

4 September 1986 Merlion Cup	North Korea	2–0	Canada	Kallang, Singapore
	Yun Jong-su 56'; Kim Jong-man 78'	Report		Stadium: National Stadium

6 September 1986 Merlion Cup final	China	2–1	North Korea	Kallang, Singapore
	Qin Guorong 13'; Ma Lin 53'	Report	Kim Pung-il 50'	Stadium: National Stadium

7 October Friendly	Poland	2–2	North Korea	Bydgoszcz, Poland
	Tarasiewicz 30' (pen.); Karaś 90'	Report	Kim Pung-il 58'; Park Wang-choi 67'	Stadium: Stadion Miejski im. Zdzisława Krzyszkowiaka; Attendance: 17,000; Referee: Octavian Augustin Streng

=== 1988 ===
8 May Friendly	China	0–0	North Korea	Beijing, China
		Report

26 May 1988 AFC Asian Cup qualification	Syria	2–1	North Korea	Kathmandu, Nepal
	Al Nasser 28'; Kareghli 90'	Report	Kang Myong-sam 45'	Stadium: Dasharath Rangasala

27 May 1988 AFC Asian Cup qualification	Nepal	0–1	North Korea	Kathmandu, Nepal
		Report	Ju Kyong-shik 52'	Stadium: Dasharath Rangasala

31 May 1988 AFC Asian Cup qualification	North Korea	1–0	Hong Kong	Kathmandu, Nepal
	Kim Kwang-min 22'	Report		Stadium: Dasharath Rangasala

2 June 1988 AFC Asian Cup qualification	Iran	0–0	North Korea	Kathmandu, Nepal
		Report		Stadium: Dasharath Rangasala; Referee: Abdulaziz Mohamed (United Arab Emirates)

=== 1989 ===
27 January 1989 Nehru Cup	India	1–2	North Korea	Goa, India
	Panji	Report	Oh Yong-nam; Kim Yun-chol

21 May 1990 FIFA World Cup qualification	Indonesia	0–0	North Korea	Jakarta, Indonesia
		Report		Stadium: Senayan Stadium; Attendance: 30.000; Referee: P.T. Murthi (Singapore)

27 May 1990 FIFA World Cup qualification	Hong Kong	1–2	North Korea	Causeway Bay, Hong Kong
	Santos 60' (pen.)	Report	Kim Kwang-min 3'; Tak Yong-bin 4'	Stadium: Hong Kong Stadium; Attendance: 16,327; Referee: Ismail Yacob (Malaysia)

4 June 1990 FIFA World Cup qualification	Japan	2–1	North Korea	Tokyo, Japan
	Mizunuma 74'; Oh Yong-nam 88' (o.g.)	Report	Yun Jong-su 71'	Stadium: National Stadium; Attendance: 35,000; Referee: Jassim Mandi (Bahrain)

25 June 1990 FIFA World Cup qualification	North Korea	2–0	Japan	Pyongyang, North Korea
	Kim Pung-il 36'; Ri Hyok-chon 84'	Report		Stadium: Yanggakdo Stadium; Attendance: 35,000; Referee: N. Kunalan (Singapore)

2 July 1990 FIFA World Cup qualification	North Korea	4–1	Hong Kong	Pyongyang, North Korea
	Ri Hyok-chon 18'; Han Hyong-il 29'; Kim Pung-il 80'; Ju Kyong-shik 86'	Report	Bredbury 23'	Stadium: Yanggakdo Stadium; Attendance: 28,000; Referee: Wang Xuezhi (China)

9 July 1990 FIFA World Cup qualification	North Korea	2–1	Indonesia	Pyongyang, North Korea
	Ju Kyong-shik 40'; Han Hyong-il 64'	Report	Lolumbuman 73'	Stadium: Yanggakdo Stadium; Attendance: 35,000; Referee: Manouchehr Nazari (Iran)

12 October 1990 FIFA World Cup qualification	United Arab Emirates	0–0	North Korea	Kallang, Singapore
		Report		Stadium: National Stadium; Attendance: 18,540; Referee: Rune Larsson (Sweden)

16 October 1990 FIFA World Cup qualification	South Korea	1–0	North Korea	Kallang, Singapore
	Hwang Sun-hong 18'	Report		Stadium: National Stadium; Attendance: 15,510; Referee: José Antonio García (Mexico)

20 October 1990 FIFA World Cup qualification	North Korea	2–0	Qatar	Kallang, Singapore
	Kim Pung-il 23'; Ju Kyong-shik 32'	Report		Stadium: National Stadium; Attendance: 15,510; Referee: José Antonio García (Mexico)

24 October 1990 FIFA World Cup qualification	China	1–0	North Korea	Kallang, Singapore
	Xie Yuxin 67'	Report		Stadium: National Stadium; Attendance: 14,730; Referee: Rune Larsson (Sweden)

28 October 1990 FIFA World Cup qualification	Saudi Arabia	2–0	North Korea	Kallang, Singapore
	Al-Musaibeah 13'; Al-Suwaiti 57'	Report		Stadium: Jalan Besar Stadium; Attendance: 531; Referee: José Antonio García (Mexico)

=== 1990 ===
27 July 1990 Dynasty Cup	China	2–0	North Korea	Beijing, China
	Gao Sheng 8'; Ma Lin 46'	Report		Stadium: Workers' Stadium; Referee: Jassem A Rahman El Mandi (Bahrain)

29 July 1990 Dynasty Cup	South Korea	1–0	North Korea	Beijing, China
	Hwangbo Kwan 89'	Report		Stadium: Workers' Stadium; Attendance: 30,000; Referee: Nathan Subramaniam (Malaysia)

31 July 1990 Dynasty Cup	North Korea	1–0	Japan	Beijing, China
	Ri Hyok-chon 66'	Report		Stadium: Workers' Stadium; Attendance: 30,000; Referee: Jassem A Rahman El Mandi (Bahrain)

18 August Friendly	North Korea	0–0	Cuba	Pyongyang, North Korea
		Report

26 September 1990 Asian Games	Malaysia	0–0	North Korea	Beijing, China
		Report		Stadium: Xiannongtan Stadium; Referee: Thomson Chan (Hong Kong)

26 September 1990 Asian Games	North Korea	1–2	Iran	Beijing, China
	Kim Yun-chol 87'	Report	Pious 79'; Bayani 90'	Stadium: Xiannongtan Stadium; Referee: Chuang Chin-fan (Chinese Taipei)

1 October 1990 Asian Games	Saudi Arabia	0–0 (a.e.t.) (4–5 p)	North Korea	Beijing, China
		Report		Stadium: Xiannongtan Stadium; Referee: Kiichiro Tachi (Japan)

3 October 1990 Asian Games	Thailand	0–1	North Korea	Beijing, China
		Report	Yun Jong-su 52'	Stadium: Xiannongtan Stadium; Referee: Omer Al Mehannah (Saudi Arabia)

6 October 1990 Asian Games final	Iran	0–0 (a.e.t.) (4–1 p)	North Korea	Beijing, China
		Report		Stadium: Workers' Stadium; Referee: Chen Shengcai (China)
	Penalties
	Ghayeghran (penalty scored); Ansarifard (penalty scored); Eftekhari (penalty scored); Namjoo-Motlagh (penalty scored)		(penalty missed) Pang Gwang-chol; (penalty missed) Yun Jong-su; (penalty scored) Tak Yong-bin

11 October Friendly	North Korea	2–1	South Korea	Pyongyang, North Korea
	Yun Jong-su 49'; Tak Yong-bin 90+1' (pen.)	Report	Kim Joo-sung 25'	Attendance: 150,000

23 October Friendly	South Korea	1–0	North Korea	Seoul, South Korea
	Hwang Sun-hong 25'	Report		Stadium: Seoul Olympic Stadium; Attendance: 70,000

=== 1991 ===
8 May Friendly	South Korea	1–2	North Korea	Seoul, South Korea
		Report

19 October Friendly	United States	1–2	North Korea	Washington, D.C., United States
	Murray 25'	Report	Yun Jong-su 13'; Choi Yong-son 48'	Stadium: RFK Stadium; Attendance: 16,351; Referee: Derek Douglas (Canada)

=== 1992 ===
June 3rd Pyongyang Cup International Football Tournament	North Korea	3–1	Kazakhstan	Pyongyang, North Korea
		Report

3 June 1992 AFC Asian Cup qualification	North Korea	6–0	Chinese Taipei	Pyongyang, North Korea
		Report

5 June 1992 AFC Asian Cup qualification	North Korea	2–0	Macau	Pyongyang, North Korea
		Report

7 June 1992 AFC Asian Cup qualification	North Korea	0–0	Hong Kong	Pyongyang, North Korea
		Report		Referee: Shinichiro Obata (Japan)

22 August 1992 Dynasty Cup	China	2–2	North Korea	Beijing, China
	Xu Hong 65'; Gao Hongbo 89'	Report	Choi Won-nam 41'; Kim Jong-song 75'	Stadium: Workers' Stadium; Attendance: 55,000; Referee: Mohamed Nazri Abdullah (Malaysia)

24 August 1992 Dynasty Cup	South Korea	1–1	North Korea	Beijing, China
	Hong Myung-bo 22'	Report	Choi Yong-son 89'	Stadium: Workers' Stadium; Attendance: 60,000; Referee: Nizar Watti (Syria)

26 August 1992 Dynasty Cup	North Korea	1–4	Japan	Beijing, China
	Kim Jong-song 13'	Report	Fukuda 33'; Takagi 35', 46'; Miura 74'	Stadium: Workers' Stadium; Attendance: 20,000; Referee: Chen Yam Ming (Hong Kong)

29 August 1992 Dynasty Cup	China	0–0 (a.e.t.) (4–5 p)	North Korea	Xiaogan, China
		Report		Stadium: Xiaogan Stadium; Referee: Nizar Watti (Syria)

30 October 1992 AFC Asian Cup	North Korea	0–2	Iran	Onomichi, Japan
		Report	Pious 30'; Ghayeghran 80'	Stadium: Bingo Stadium; Attendance: 8,000; Referee: Omer Al Mehannah (Saudi Arabia)

1 November 1992 AFC Asian Cup	Japan	1–1	North Korea	Hiroshima, Japan
	Nakayama 80'	Report	Kim Kwang-min 29' (pen.)	Stadium: Hiroshima Big Arch; Attendance: 32,000; Referee: Rasheed Al-Jassas (Kuwait)

3 November 1992 AFC Asian Cup	United Arab Emirates	2–1	North Korea	Hiroshima, Japan
	Mubarak 81'; Bakheet 85'	Report	Kim Kwang-min 69'	Stadium: Hiroshima Big Arch; Attendance: 33,000; Referee: Neji Jouini (Tunisia)

=== 1993 ===
31 January 1993 Nehru Cup	North Korea	3–2	Finland	Chennai, India
	Choi Yong-son 33', 41'; Ryu Song-gun 73'	Report	Karvinen 67'; Rajamäki 71'	Stadium: Jawaharlal Nehru Stadium; Attendance: 17,500

9 April 1994 FIFA World Cup qualification	North Korea	3–0	Vietnam	Doha, Qatar
	Yun Jong-su 29'; Choi Yong-son 85'; Ryu Song-gun 86'	Report		Stadium: Khalifa International Stadium; Attendance: 10,000; Referee: Sanhoub Mohammed Yahia

11 April 1994 FIFA World Cup qualification	North Korea	2–1	Singapore	Doha, Qatar
	Cho In-chol 64'; Choi Won-nam 75'	Report	V. Sundramoorthy 32'	Stadium: Khalifa International Stadium; Attendance: 12,000; Referee: Ishad Abu Ali

13 April 1994 FIFA World Cup qualification	North Korea	4–0	Indonesia	Doha, Qatar
	Ryu Song-gun 19'; Choi Yong-son 42', 58'; Darwis 77' (o.g.)	Report		Stadium: Khalifa International Stadium; Referee: Hossein Khoshkhan

18 April 1994 FIFA World Cup qualification	Qatar	1–2	North Korea	Doha, Qatar
	Khalil Al-Malki 89'	Report	Ryu Song-gun 49', 57'	Stadium: Khalifa International Stadium; Attendance: 12,000; Referee: Shinichiro Obata (Japan)

24 April 1994 FIFA World Cup qualification	Vietnam	0–1	North Korea	Kallang, Singapore
		Report	Ri Yong-jin 61'	Stadium: National Stadium; Attendance: 15,000; Referee: Yapa A Mahasena (Sri Lanka)

26 April 1994 FIFA World Cup qualification	Singapore	1–3	North Korea	Kallang, Singapore
	Saad 72'	Report	Choi Won-nam 26'; Choi Yong-son 41', 76'	Stadium: National Stadium; Attendance: 10,000; Referee: Leamash Ibrahim (United Arab Emirates)

28 April 1994 FIFA World Cup qualification	Indonesia	1–3	North Korea	Kallang, Singapore
	Darmawan 35'	Report	Pang Gwang-chol 4'; Ryu Song-gun 68'	Stadium: National Stadium; Attendance: 6,000; Referee: Pirom Un-prasert (Thailand)

2 May 1994 FIFA World Cup qualification	North Korea	2–2	Qatar	Kallang, Singapore
	Cho In-chol 40'; Kim Kyong-il 55'	Report	Al-Malki 1', 86'	Stadium: National Stadium; Attendance: 6,000; Referee: Abrahan Alvari

15 October 1994 FIFA World Cup qualification	North Korea	3–2	Iraq	Doha, Qatar
	Kim Kwang-min 63'; Kim Kyong-il 76'; Choi Won-nam 80'	Report	Kadhim 8', 46'	Stadium: Khalifa International Stadium; Attendance: 20,000; Referee: Jaap Uilenberg (Netherlands)

18 October 1994 FIFA World Cup qualification	North Korea	1–2	Saudi Arabia	Doha, Qatar
	Ryu Song-gun 68'	Report	Al-Mehallel 56'; Massad 73'	Stadium: Khalifa International Stadium; Attendance: 15,000; Referee: Ion Crăciunescu (Romania)

21 October 1994 FIFA World Cup qualification	North Korea	0–3	Japan	Doha, Qatar
		Report	Miura 28', 69'; Nakayama 51'	Stadium: Khalifa International Stadium; Attendance: 3,000; Referee: Serge Muhmenthaler (Switzerland)

25 October 1994 FIFA World Cup qualification	Iran	2–1	North Korea	Doha, Qatar
	Daei 49', 66'	Report	Choi Won-nam 22'	Stadium: Khalifa International Stadium; Attendance: 5,000; Referee: Fabio Baldas (Italy)

28 October 1994 FIFA World Cup qualification	South Korea	3–0	North Korea	Doha, Qatar
	Ko Jeong-woon 49'; Hwang Sun-hong 53'; Ha Seok-ju 75'	Report		Stadium: Qatar SC Stadium; Attendance: 4,000; Referee: Ion Crăciunescu (Romania)

=== 1998 ===
13 September Friendly	Kuwait	4–0	North Korea	Kuwait City, Kuwait
		Report

19 September Friendly	Kuwait	1–1	North Korea	Kuwait City, Kuwait
		Report

2 December 1998 Asian Games	United Arab Emirates	3–3 (4–1 p)	North Korea	Songkhla, Thailand
	Matar 20'; Mohamed 31', 39'	Report	Kang Sun-il 62'; Ri Chang-ha 82'; Jon Yong-chol 89'	Stadium: Tinsulanon Stadium

7 December 1998 Asian Games	North Korea	0–4	Uzbekistan	Bangkok, Thailand
		Report	Shirshov 16', 75'; Shkvyrin 60'; Akopyants 66'	Stadium: Supachalasai Stadium

9 December 1998 Asian Games	North Korea	1–1	Turkmenistan	Bangkok, Thailand
	Ri Chang-ha 70'	Report	Bondarenko 89'	Stadium: Supachalasai Stadium

11 December 1998 Asian Games	India	0–2	North Korea	Bangkok, Thailand
		Report	So Min-chol 11'; Ju Song-il 73'	Stadium: Supachalasai Stadium

=== 1999 ===
23 February 1999 King's Cup	Thailand	2–2	North Korea	Bangkok, Thailand
		Report
