= Hong Kong national football team results (1980–1989) =

- Win Draw Loss

This is a list of the Hong Kong national football team results from 1980 to 1989.

== 1980 ==
9 June 1980 Guangzhou International; Friendship Tournament; Group Stage	Hong Kong	1–3	Japan	Guangzhou, China

18 June 1980 Guangzhou International; Friendship Tournament; 5th to 7th Place Playoff	Hong Kong	0–2	Japan	Guangzhou, China

30 June 1980 Guangzhou International; Friendship Tournament; Group Stage	China	7–0	Hong Kong	Guangzhou, China

5 December International friendly	Hong Kong	1–0	Australia	British Hong Kong

21 December 1982 FIFA World Cup; Qualification 1st Round; Group 4 Classification match	Hong Kong	0–1	China	British Hong Kong
			Chen Jingang	Referee: Al-Mauzan (Saudi Arabia)

24 December 1982 FIFA World Cup; Qualification 1st Round; Group 4 Group B	Hong Kong	1–1	Singapore	British Hong Kong
	Choi York Yee		Pathmanathan	Referee: Arafat (Syria)

28 December 1982 FIFA World Cup; Qualification 1st Round; Group 4 Group B	Hong Kong	2–2	North Korea	British Hong Kong
	Wong Chi Keung; Wu Kwok Hung		Li Yong-man; Li Yong-sob	Referee: Arafat (Syria)

31 December 1982 FIFA World Cup; Qualification 1st Round; Group 4 Semi-finals	Hong Kong	0–0 (a.e.t.) (4–5 p)	China	British Hong Kong
				Referee: Getkaew (Thailand)

== 1981 ==
No matches were played in 1981.

== 1982 ==
21 July 1982 Beijing International; Friendship Tournament; Group Stage	China	2–0	Hong Kong	Beijing, China

25 July 1982 Beijing International; Friendship Tournament; Group Stage	Hong Kong	0–0	Morocco	Beijing, China

== 1983 ==
18 July 1983 Great Wall Cup; Quarter-finals	Hong Kong	1–1 (a.e.t.) (3–4 p)	Thailand	Beijing, China
	Piyapong 25'		Lai Wing Cheong 43'

== 1984 ==
17 June 41st HK–Macau Interport	Macau	0–3	Hong Kong	Portuguese Macau

10 September 1984 AFC Asian Cup; Qualification Group 4	Jordan	1–1	Hong Kong	Guangzhou, China

12 September 1984 AFC Asian Cup; Qualification Group 4	Hong Kong	0–1	Qatar	Guangzhou, China

15 September 1984 AFC Asian Cup; Qualification Group 4	Afghanistan	0–0	Hong Kong	Guangzhou, China

17 September 1984 AFC Asian Cup; Qualification Group 4	China	2–0	Hong Kong	Guangzhou, China

== 1985 ==
17 February 1986 FIFA World Cup; Qualification 1st Round; Group 3	Hong Kong	0–0	China	So Kon Po, British Hong Kong
		Report		Stadium: Government Stadium; Attendance: 20,935; Referee: Maidin Bin Singah (Singapore)

23 February 1986 FIFA World Cup; Qualification 1st Round; Group 3	Hong Kong	8–0	Brunei	So Kon Po, British Hong Kong
	Mak King Fun 2', 51', 79', 85'; Lai Wing Cheung 4'; Lee Wai Shan 30'; Lau Wing Yip 74', 87'	Report		Stadium: Government Stadium; Attendance: 12,401; Referee: Stephen Ovinis (Malaysia)

6 April 1986 FIFA World Cup; Qualification 1st Round; Group 3	Brunei	1–5	Hong Kong	Bandar Seri Begawan, Brunei
	Kassim 49'	Report	Wan Chi Keung 4', 82'; Lai Wing Cheung 7'; Lau Wing Yip 38', 83'	Referee: Sudarso Hardjowasito (Indonesia)

28 April 1986 FIFA World Cup; Qualification 1st Round; Group 3	Macau	0–2	Hong Kong	Portuguese Macau
		Report	Lau Wing Yip 80'; Cheung Ka Ping 88'	Stadium: Macau Stadium; Referee: Somporn Patcharamukdakorn (Thailand)

4 May 1986 FIFA World Cup; Qualification 1st Round; Group 3	Hong Kong	2–0	Macau	So Kon Po, Hong Kong
	Lau Wing Yip 8', 30'	Report		Stadium: Government Stadium; Referee: Kil Ki-Chul (Korea Republic)

19 May 1986 FIFA World Cup; Qualification 1st Round; Group 3	China	1–2	Hong Kong	Beijing, China
	Li Hui 32'	Report	Cheung Chi Tak 26'; Ku Kam Fai 60'	Stadium: Workers Stadium; Attendance: 60,000; Referee: Melvyn J. Victor D'Souza (India)

1 June 42nd HK–Macau Interport	Hong Kong	2–0	Macau	British Hong Kong

11 August 1986 FIFA World Cup; Qualification 2nd Round; 1st Leg	Japan	3–0	Hong Kong	Kobe, Japan
	Kimura 9' (pen.); Hara 11'; Mizunuma 53'	Report		Stadium: Kobe Central Stadium; Attendance: 19,000; Referee: Tulu Gurkan (Philippines)

22 September 1986 FIFA World Cup; Qualification 2nd Round; 2nd Leg	Hong Kong	1–2 (1–5 agg.)	Japan	So Kon Po, British Hong Kong
	Wan Chi Keung 79' (pen.)	Report	Kimura 45'; Hara 90'	Stadium: Government Stadium; Attendance: 28,000; Referee: Lee Kok Leong (Singapore)

== 1986 ==
4 June International Friendly	Nepal	4–2	Hong Kong	Kathmandu, Nepal

== 1987 ==
No matches were played in 1987.

== 1988 ==
25 May 1988 AFC Asian Cup; Qualification Group 3	Nepal	0–0	Hong Kong	Kathmandu, Nepal

27 May 1988 AFC Asian Cup; Qualification Group 3	Iran	2–0	Hong Kong	Kathmandu, Nepal

31 May 1988 AFC Asian Cup; Qualification Group 3	Hong Kong	0–1	North Korea	Kathmandu, Nepal

3 June 1988 AFC Asian Cup; Qualification Group 3	Hong Kong	0–2	Syria	Kathmandu, Nepal

29 June International Friendly	Hong Kong	0–3	Saudi Arabia	Melbourne, Australia

1 July International Friendly	Hong Kong	0–1	Saudi Arabia	Melbourne, Australia

== 1989 ==
22 May 1990 FIFA World Cup; Qualification Group 6	Hong Kong	0–0	Japan	Mong Kok, British Hong Kong
				Stadium: Mong Kok Stadium; Attendance: 16,313; Referee: Kil Ki-Chul (Korea Republic)

27 May 1990 FIFA World Cup; Qualification Group 6	Hong Kong	1–2	North Korea	Mong Kok, British Hong Kong
	Santos 60' (pen.)		Kim Gwang-mon 3'; Tak Yong-bin 4'	Stadium: Mong Kok Stadium; Attendance: 16,327; Referee: Ismail Yacob (Malaysia)

4 June 1990 FIFA World Cup; Qualification Group 6	Hong Kong	1–1	Indonesia	Mong Kok, British Hong Kong
	Bredbury 31'		Mustamu 67'	Stadium: Mong Kok Stadium; Attendance: 12,334; Referee: Al-Mulla (United Arab Emirates)

18 June 1990 FIFA World Cup; Qualification Group 6	Japan	0–0	Hong Kong	Kobe, Japan
				Stadium: Universiade Memorial Stadium; Attendance: 28,000; Referee: Subramaniam Nathan (Malaysia)

25 June 1990 FIFA World Cup; Qualification Group 6	Indonesia	3–2	Hong Kong	Jakarta, Indonesia
	Mustaqim 60'; Kiswanto 74', 89'		Leung Nang Yan 11', 64'	Stadium: Senayan Stadium; Referee: El-Nasir (Saudi Arabia)

2 July 1990 FIFA World Cup; Qualification Group 6	North Korea	4–1	Hong Kong	Pyongyang, North Korea
	Li Hyok-chom 18'; Han Hyong-il 29'; Kim Pung-il 80'; Chu Gyong-sik		Bredbury 23'	Stadium: Yanggakdo Stadium; Attendance: 28,000; Referee: Wang Xuezhi (China PR)
