= Football at the 1990 Asian Games – Men's tournament =

Men's football at the 1990 Asian Games
- Venue: Xiannongtan Stadium; Fengtai Stadium; Workers' Stadium
- Date: 23 September – 6 October
- Nations: 14

Medalists
gold medal	Iran
silver medal	North Korea
bronze medal	South Korea

Football was contested as part of the programme for the 1990 Asian Games which was hosted in Beijing, China from 22 September to 7 October 1990. It was the 11th edition of the men's football tournament at the multi-sport event organised by the Olympic Council of Asia.

The men's football tournament began with the first matches of the group stage on 23 September 1990 and ended with the gold medal match on 6 October 1990. Iran and North Korea contested the final. After a goalless draw, Iran defeated North Korea 4–1 on penalties to win the gold medal. In the bronze medal match, defending champions South Korea defeated Thailand 1–0.

== Background ==
Football had been part of the Asian Games programme following the debut of the men's competition at the inaugural 1951 Asian Games in India.

South Korea held the record for gold medals having won the football tournament three times. However, they had only won the gold medal outright once after twice sharing the title. India and Taiwan had both won the gold medal outright twice. South Korea were also the defending champions after defeating Saudi Arabia as hosts 2–0 in the final at the 1986 Asian Games.

== Format ==
In total, 14 teams took part in the competition. They were drawn into four single round robin groups – two of four teams and two of three teams. The group winners and runners-up would then contest the quarter-finals. The winners of the quarter-finals would contest the semi-finals which would decide which teams contested the gold and bronze medal matches.

=== Participants ===
- Bangladesh
- China
- Hong Kong
- Iran
- Japan
- Kuwait
- Malaysia
- North Korea
- Saudi Arabia
- Singapore
- Pakistan
- South Korea
- Thailand
- Yemen

== Venues ==
Matches were played at three venues in Beijing including the Workers' Stadium, the Fengtai Stadium and the Xiannongtan Stadium.

Beijing
Workers' Stadium	Fengtai Stadium	Xiannongtan Stadium
Capacity: 80,000	Capacity: 30,000	Capacity: 24,000

== Group stage ==
=== Group A ===
South Korea and China advanced to the quarter-finals.

==== Table ====
Pos	Team	Pld	W	D	L	GF	GA	GD	Pts	Qualification
1	South Korea	3	3	0	0	16	0	+16	6	Qualification for the quarter-finals
2	China	3	2	0	1	8	3	+5	4	Qualification for the quarter-finals
3	Singapore	3	1	0	2	7	13	−6	2	
4	Pakistan	3	0	0	3	1	16	−15	0	

==== Matches ====
23 September 1990

South Korea	7–0	Singapore
Hong Myung-bo 10' (pen.); Kim Joo-sung 48', 59'; Ko Jeong-woon 51', 61'; Seo Jung-won 58', 62'

Xiannongtan Stadium, Beijing
Referee: Omer Al-Mehannah (Saudi Arabia)
23 September 1990

Pakistan	0–3	China
		Xie Yuxin 15', 46'; Mai Chao 90'

Xiannongtan Stadium, Beijing
Referee: Kim Jong-mu (North Korea)

25 September 1990

Singapore	1–5	China
Haron 31'		Xie Yuxin 14'; Mai Chao 50'; Wu Qunli 55'; Liu Haiguang 60', 88'

Fengtai Stadium, Beijing
Referee: Vichai Charupunt (Thailand)
25 September 1990

Pakistan	0–7	South Korea
		Hwang Sun-hong 22', 41', 82'; Kim Sang-ho 47', 51'; Chung Jong-soo 58'; Noh Jung-yoon 77'

Fengtai Stadium, Beijing
Referee: Stephen Ovinis (Malaysia)

27 September 1990

China	0–2	South Korea
		Seo Jung-won 57', 75'

Workers' Stadium, Beijing
Referee: Manouchehr Nazari (Iran)
27 September 1990

Singapore	6–1	Pakistan
Tokijan 15'; Ahmad 17'; Sundramoorthy 31', 42', 62'; Noor 78'		Sharafat 35'

Xiannongtan Stadium, Beijing
Referee: Mohamed Sanhoub (Yemen)

=== Group B ===
Iran and North Korea advanced to the quarter-finals.

==== Table ====
Pos	Team	Pld	W	D	L	GF	GA	GD	Pts	Qualification
1	Iran	2	2	0	0	5	1	+4	4	Qualification for the quarter-finals
2	North Korea	2	0	1	1	1	2	−1	1	Qualification for the quarter-finals
3	Malaysia	2	0	1	1	0	3	−3	1	

==== Matches ====
24 September 1990

Iran	3–0	Malaysia
Pious 31', 54', 78'

Fengtai Stadium, Beijing
Referee: Wei Jihong (China)

26 September 1990

Malaysia	0–0	North Korea

Xiannongtan Stadium, Beijing
Referee: Thomson Chan (Hong Kong)

28 September 1990

North Korea	1–2	Iran
Kim Yun-chol 87'		Pious 79'; Shahr. Bayani 90'

Xiannongtan Stadium, Beijing
Referee: Chuang Chin-fan (Chinese Taipei)

=== Group C ===
Thailand and Kuwait advanced to the quarter-finals.

==== Table ====
Pos	Team	Pld	W	D	L	GF	GA	GD	Pts	Qualification
1	Thailand	3	2	1	0	4	1	+3	5	Qualification for the quarter-finals
2	Kuwait	3	1	1	1	3	3	0	3	Qualification for the quarter-finals
3	Hong Kong	3	1	0	2	3	4	−1	2	
4	Yemen	3	0	2	1	0	2	−2	2	

==== Matches ====
23 September 1990

Kuwait	2–1	Hong Kong
Al-Mesnad 12'; Saeed 72'		Chow Chi Shing 67'

Fengtai Stadium, Beijing
Referee: Kiichiro Tachi (Japan)
23 September 1990

Yemen	0–0	Thailand

Fengtai Stadium, Beijing
Referee: Chuang Chin-fan (Chinese Taipei)

25 September 1990

Hong Kong	0–2	Thailand
		Nounoi 57'; Kijmongkolsak 80'

Xiannongtan Stadium, Beijing
Referee: Manouchehr Nazari (Iran)
25 September 1990

Yemen	0–0	Kuwait

Xiannongtan Stadium, Beijing
Referee: Chen Shengcai (China)

27 September 1990

Hong Kong	2–0	Yemen
Lai Wing Cheong 6'; Ku Kam Fai 37'

Xiannongtan Stadium, Beijing
Referee: Badruddin Badhu Badruddin (Bangladesh)
27 September 1990

Thailand	2–1	Kuwait
Hussain 2' (o.g.); Changmoon 11'		Al-Enezi 85'

Fengtai Stadium, Beijing
Referee: Zhong Bohong (China)

=== Group D ===
Saudi Arabia and Japan advanced to the quarter-finals.

==== Table ====
Pos	Team	Pld	W	D	L	GF	GA	GD	Pts	Qualification
1	Saudi Arabia	2	2	0	0	6	0	+6	4	Qualification for the quarter-finals
2	Japan	2	1	0	1	3	2	+1	2	Qualification for the quarter-finals
3	Bangladesh	2	0	0	2	0	7	−7	0	

==== Matches ====
24 September 1990

Saudi Arabia	4–0	Bangladesh
Abdulshakoor 11'; Abdullah 12', 80' (pen.); Al-Bishi 73'

Xiannongtan Stadium, Beijing
Referee: Robert Lee (Singapore)

26 September 1990

Bangladesh	0–3	Japan
		Hashiratani 4' (pen.); Hasegawa 26', 60'

Fengtai Stadium, Beijing
Referee: Kim In-soo (South Korea)

28 September 1990

Japan	0–2	Saudi Arabia
		Al-Bishi 30'; Al-Muwallid 48'

Fengtai Stadium, Beijing
Referee: Kim In-soo (South Korea)

== Knockout stage ==
=== Quarter-finals ===
South Korea, Iran and Thailand all won 1–0 to advance to the semi-finals while North Korea defeated Saudi Arabia 4–3 on penalties.

1 October 1990

South Korea	1–0	Kuwait
Gu Sang-bum 59'

Fengtai Stadium, Beijing
Referee: Wei Jihong (China)

1 October 1990

Iran	1–0	Japan
Marfavi 6'

Fengtai Stadium, Beijing
Referee: Chen Shengcai (China)

1 October 1990

Thailand	1–0	China
Changmoon 51'

Workers' Stadium, Beijing
Referee: Omer Al-Mehannah (Saudi Arabia)

1 October 1990

Saudi Arabia	0–0 (a.e.t.)	North Korea
Penalties
	3–4

Xiannongtan Stadium, Beijing
Referee: Kiichiro Tachi (Japan)

=== Semi-finals ===
Iran defeated South Korea after extra time and North Korea defeated Thailand to advance to the gold medal match.

3 October 1990

South Korea	0–1 (a.e.t.)	Iran
		Ghayeghran 107'

Workers' Stadium, Beijing
Referee: Kiichiro Tachi (Japan)

3 October 1990

Thailand	0–1	North Korea
		Yun Jong-su 42'

Xiannongtan Stadium, Beijing
Referee: Omer Al-Mehannah (Saudi Arabia)

== Bronze medal match ==
Hwangbo Kwan scored the only goal as South Korea defeated Thailand to win the bronze medal.

5 October 1990

South Korea	1–0	Thailand
Hwangbo Kwan 51'

Xiannongtan Stadium, Beijing
Referee: Manouchehr Nazari (Iran)

== Gold medal match ==
After a goalless 90 minutes and extra time, Iran defeated North Korea 4–1 on penalties to win the gold medal.

6 October 1990

Iran	0–0 (a.e.t.)	North Korea
Penalties
	4–1

Workers' Stadium, Beijing
Referee: Chen Shengcai (China)

== Final standing ==
Rank	Team	Pld	W	D	L	GF	GA	GD	Pts
1st place, gold medalist(s)	Iran	5	4	1	0	7	1	+6	9
2nd place, silver medalist(s)	North Korea	5	1	3	1	2	2	0	5
3rd place, bronze medalist(s)	South Korea	6	5	0	1	18	1	+17	10
4	Thailand	6	3	1	2	5	3	+2	7
5	Saudi Arabia	3	2	1	0	6	0	+6	5
6	China	4	2	0	2	8	4	+4	4
7	Kuwait	4	1	1	2	3	4	−1	3
8	Japan	3	1	0	2	3	3	0	2
9	Hong Kong	3	1	0	2	3	4	−1	2
10	Yemen	3	0	2	1	0	2	−2	2
11	Singapore	3	1	0	2	7	13	−6	2
12	Malaysia	2	0	1	1	0	3	−3	1
13	Bangladesh	2	0	0	2	0	7	−7	0
14	Pakistan	3	0	0	3	1	16	−15	0
