= 1990 FIFA World Cup qualification (AFC) =

Tournament details
- Teams: 25 (from 1 confederation)

Tournament statistics
- Top scorer: (South Korea) Hwang Sun-Hong (7 goals)
- Best player: (South Korea) Kim Joo-sung

The Asian Football Confederation was allocated two assured qualifying berths for the 1990 FIFA World Cup. 26 teams were in the running for these spots; Bahrain, India, Maldives and South Yemen withdrew without playing a qualifying match.

Asia's two automatic qualifying berths were taken by Korea Republic and the United Arab Emirates.

== Format ==
- First round: The Maldives withdrew before the final draw, leaving 25 teams to be divided into 6 groups of 4 or 5 teams each. Nepal was moved from Group 5 to Group 4 after India's withdrawal. The teams played against each other on a home-and-away basis, except in Group 4, where the teams played against each other twice in South Korea and Singapore. The group winners would advance to the final round.
- Final round: The 6 teams played against each other once over a 16-day period based in Singapore. The group winner and runner-up would qualify.

== First round ==
=== Group 1 ===
Team	Pld	W	D	L	GF	GA	GD	Pts	QAT	IRQ	JOR	OMA
Qatar	6	3	3	0	8	3	+5	9	—	1 – 0	1 – 0	3 – 0
Iraq	6	3	2	1	11	5	+6	8	2 – 2	—	4 – 0	3 – 1
Jordan	6	2	1	3	5	7	−2	5	1 – 1	0 – 1	—	2 – 0
Oman	6	0	2	4	2	11	−9	2	0 – 0	1 – 1	0 – 2	—

Qatar advanced to the final round.

=== Group 2 ===
Team	Pld	W	D	L	GF	GA	GD	Pts	KSA	SYR	NYE	BHR
Saudi Arabia	4	3	1	0	7	4	+3	7	—	5 – 4	1 – 0	X – X
Syria	4	2	1	1	7	5	+2	5	0 – 0	—	2 – 0	X – X
North Yemen	4	0	0	4	0	5	−5	0	0 – 1	0 – 1	—	X – X
Bahrain	0	0	0	0	0	0	0	0	X – X	X – X	X – X	—

Saudi Arabia advanced to the final round.

=== Group 3 ===
Team	Pld	W	D	L	GF	GA	GD	Pts	UAE	KUW	PAK	SYE
United Arab Emirates	4	3	0	1	12	4	+8	6	—	1 – 0	5 – 0	X – X
Kuwait	4	3	0	1	6	3	+3	6	3 – 2	—	2 – 0	X – X
Pakistan	4	0	0	4	1	12	−11	0	1 – 4	0 – 1	—	X – X
South Yemen	0	0	0	0	0	0	0	0	X – X	X – X	X – X	—

United Arab Emirates advanced to the final round.

=== Group 4 ===
Team	Pld	W	D	L	GF	GA	GD	Pts	Qualification	KOR	MAS	SIN	NEP	IND
South Korea	6	6	0	0	25	0	+25	12		—	3 – 0	3 – 0	9 – 0	X – X
Malaysia	6	3	1	2	8	8	0	7		0 – 3	—	1 – 0	3 – 0	X – X
Singapore	6	2	1	3	12	9	+3	5		0 – 3	2 – 2	—	7 – 0	X – X
Nepal	6	0	0	6	0	28	−28	0		0 – 4	0 – 2	0 – 3	—	X – X
India	0	0	0	0	0	0	0	0	Withdrew	X – X	X – X	X – X	X – X	—

Korea Republic advanced to the final round.

=== Group 5 ===
Team	Pld	W	D	L	GF	GA	GD	Pts	CHN	IRN	BAN	THA
China	6	5	0	1	13	3	+10	10	—	2 – 0	2 – 0	2 – 0
Iran	6	5	0	1	12	5	+7	10	3 – 2	—	1 – 0	3 – 0
Bangladesh	6	1	0	5	4	9	−5	2	0 – 2	1 – 2	—	3 – 1
Thailand	6	1	0	5	2	14	−12	2	0 – 3	0 – 3	1 – 0	—

China advanced to the final round.

=== Group 6 ===
Team	Pld	W	D	L	GF	GA	GD	Pts	PRK	JPN	IDN	HKG
North Korea	6	4	1	1	11	5	+6	9	—	2 – 0	2 – 1	4 – 1
Japan	6	2	3	1	7	3	+4	7	2 – 1	—	5 – 0	0 – 0
Indonesia	6	1	3	2	5	10	−5	5	0 – 0	0 – 0	—	3 – 2
Hong Kong	6	0	3	3	5	10	−5	3	1 – 2	0 – 0	1 – 1	—

Korea DPR advanced to the final round.

== Final round ==
=== Standings ===
Team	Pld	W	D	L	GF	GA	GD	Pts
South Korea	5	3	2	0	5	1	+4	8
United Arab Emirates	5	1	4	0	4	3	+1	6
Qatar	5	1	3	1	4	5	−1	5
China	5	2	0	3	5	6	−1	4
Saudi Arabia	5	1	2	2	4	5	−1	4
North Korea	5	1	1	3	2	4	−2	3

Korea Republic and the United Arab Emirates qualified for the 1990 FIFA World Cup.

=== Results ===
12 October 1989

United Arab Emirates	0–0	North Korea

National Stadium, Singapore
Referee: Rune Larsson (Sweden)
12 October 1989

China	2–1	Saudi Arabia
Mai Chao 63' (pen.), 70'	(Report)	Al-Bishi 24' (pen.)

National Stadium, Singapore
Referee: Carlos Espósito (Argentina)

13 October 1989

South Korea	0–0	Qatar

National Stadium, Singapore
Referee: Joël Quiniou (France)

16 October 1989

Qatar	1–1	Saudi Arabia
Muftah 87'	(Report)	Al-Suwaiti 4'

National Stadium, Singapore
Attendance: 15,000
Referee: Zoran Petrović (Yugoslavia)
16 October 1989

South Korea	1–0	North Korea
Hwang Sun-hong 18'

National Stadium, Singapore
Referee: José Antonio García (Mexico)

17 October 1989

United Arab Emirates	2–1	China
K. Mubarak 87'; Al Talyani 88'		Tang Yaodong 61'

National Stadium, Singapore
Referee: Joël Quiniou (France)

20 October 1989

South Korea	1–0	China
Kim Joo-sung 67'

National Stadium, Singapore
Referee: Rune Larsson (Sweden)
20 October 1989

North Korea	2–0	Qatar
Kim Pung-Il 23'; Ghu Gyong-Sik 32'

National Stadium, Singapore
Referee: José Antonio García (Mexico)

21 October 1989

Saudi Arabia	0–0	United Arab Emirates
	(Report)

National Stadium, Singapore
Referee: Vincent Mauro (United States)

24 October 1989

United Arab Emirates	1–1	Qatar
K. Mubarak 20'		Sulaiti 37'

National Stadium, Singapore
Referee: Zoran Petrović (Yugoslavia)
24 October 1989

China	1–0	North Korea
Xie Yuxin 67'

National Stadium, Singapore
Referee: Rune Larsson (Sweden)

25 October 1989

South Korea	2–0	Saudi Arabia
Hwangbo Kwan 42'; Hwang Sun-hong 89'	(Report)

National Stadium, Singapore
Attendance: 11,288
Referee: Carlos Espósito (Argentina)

28 October 1989

Qatar	2–1	China
Al-Soufi 87'; Muftah 87'		Ma Lin 76'

National Stadium, Singapore
Referee: Vincent Mauro (United States)
28 October 1989

United Arab Emirates	1–1	South Korea
Al Talyani 16'		Hwangbo Kwan 8'

Jurong Stadium, Singapore
Referee: Joël Quiniou (France)
28 October 1989

Saudi Arabia	2–0	North Korea
Al-Musaibeah 13'; Al-Suwaiti 57'	(Report)

Jalan Besar Stadium, Singapore
Referee: José Antonio García (Mexico)

== Qualified teams ==
The following two teams from AFC qualified for the final tournament.

Team	Qualified as	Qualified on	Previous appearances in FIFA World Cup^{1}
South Korea	Final round winners	25 October 1989	2 (1954, 1986)
United Arab Emirates	Final round runners-up	28 October 1989	0 (debut)

^{1} Bold indicates champions for that year. Italic indicates hosts for that year.

== Goalscorers ==
7 goals

- (South Korea) Hwang Sun-hong

6 goals

- (China) Ma Lin
- (Iraq) Ahmed Radhi
- (Qatar) Mahmoud Yaseen Al-Soufi

5 goals

- (Malaysia) Dollah Salleh

4 goals

- (China) Mai Chao
- (South Korea) Kim Yong-se
- (Singapore) Darimosuvito Tokijan
- (United Arab Emirates) Adnan Al Talyani

3 goals

- (Iran) Mohsen Garousi
- (Iran) Farshad Pious
- (North Korea) Chu Gyong-Sik
- (North Korea) Kim Pung-Il
- (South Korea) Hwangbo Kwan
- (South Korea) Noh Soo-jin
- (Syria) Nizar Mahrous
- (United Arab Emirates) Abdul Razaq Ibrahim

2 goals

- (China) Tang Yaodong
- (China) Wang Baoshan
- (Hong Kong) Tim Bredbury
- (Hong Kong) Nang Yan Leung
- (Indonesia) Herry Kiswanto
- (Iran) Karim Bavi
- (Iraq) Hussein Saeed
- (Jordan) Mohamed Al-Diabaz
- (Jordan) Khaled Khalil Awad
- (Kuwait) Ali Marwi
- (Kuwait) Salah Al-Hasawi
- (North Korea) Han Hyong-Il
- (North Korea) Ri Hyok-chon
- (Qatar) Mansoor Muftah
- (Saudi Arabia) Fahad Al-Bishi
- (Saudi Arabia) Majed Abdullah
- (Saudi Arabia) Mohaisen Al-Jam'an
- (Saudi Arabia) Saadoun Al-Suwaiti
- (Singapore) Darimosuvito Devaraj
- (Singapore) Salim Moin
- (Singapore) Ahmad Satter
- (South Korea) Cho Min-kook
- (South Korea) Choi Sang-kook
- (South Korea) Lee Tae-ho
- (United Arab Emirates) Zuhair Bakhit
- (United Arab Emirates) Khalid Ismaïl
- (United Arab Emirates) Khaleel Mubarak

1 goal

- (Bangladesh) Mohammad Aslam
- (Bangladesh) Satyajit Das Rupu
- (Bangladesh) Wasim Iqbal
- (Bangladesh) Rumman Bin Wali Sabbir
- (China) Jia Xiuquan
- (China) Liu Haiguang
- (China) Xie Yuxin
- (China) Zhang Xiaowen
- (Hong Kong) Leslie Santos
- (Indonesia) Inyong Lolumbuman
- (Indonesia) Mustaqim
- (Indonesia) Mustamu Yessy
- (Iran) Mohammad Hassan Ansarifard
- (Iran) Sayed Ali Eftekhari
- (Iran) Sirous Ghayeghran
- (Iran) Samad Marfavi
- (Iraq) Natiq Hashim
- (Iraq) Habib Jafar
- (Iraq) Ismail Mohammed Sharif
- (Japan) Kenta Hasegawa
- (Japan) Takumi Horiike
- (Japan) Hisashi Kurosaki
- (Japan) Osamu Maeda
- (Japan) Takashi Mizunuma
- (Japan) Katsuyoshi Shinto
- (Jordan) Rateb Al-Dawoud
- (Kuwait) Abdulaziz Al-Hajeri
- (Kuwait) Fahad Yousef Al-Sovayed
- (Malaysia) Kurapiah Gunalan
- (Malaysia) Azizol Abu Haniffah
- (Malaysia) Lim Teong Kim
- (North Korea) Kim Gwang-Mon
- (North Korea) Tak Yong-Bin
- (North Korea) Yun Jong-Su
- (Oman) Mohamed Ali Hamoud
- (Oman) Nasser Khaleefa
- (Pakistan) Ali Sharafat
- (Qatar) Saleh Eid Al-Mehaizaa
- (Qatar) Jumah Salem Joher
- (Qatar) Adel Mubarak Khamis
- (Qatar) Mansour Sulaiti
- (Saudi Arabia) Fahad Al-Musaibeah
- (Saudi Arabia) Ahmed Madani
- (Saudi Arabia) Yousuf Al-Thunayan
- (Singapore) Arj Changatamilman
- (Singapore) Tay Peng Kee
- (South Korea) Choi Soon-ho
- (South Korea) Chung Hae-won
- (South Korea) Chung Yong-hwan
- (South Korea) Kim Joo-sung
- (South Korea) Lee Hak-jong
- (South Korea) Lee Young-jin
- (South Korea) Park Kyung-hoon
- (Syria) Walid Al-Nasser
- (Syria) Walid Abou El-Sel
- (Syria) Abdul Latif Helou
- (Syria) Mohammed Jakalan
- (Thailand) Prasert Changmool
- (Thailand) Piyapong Pue-On
- (United Arab Emirates) Abdulaziz Mohamed
- (United Arab Emirates) Abdulrahman Mohamed

1 own goal

- (North Korea) Oh Yong-Nam (playing against Japan)
