= Thailand national football team results (1980–1989) =

The Thailand national football team’s 1980–1989 period was a mixed but important decade. Thailand remained a strong force in Southeast Asia, especially at the SEA Games, but had much more difficulty against stronger Asian teams in World Cup and Asian Cup qualifying. This article lists the results for the Thailand national football team between 1980 and 1989.

- Only record the results that affect the FIFA/Coca-Cola World Ranking. See FIFA 'A' matches criteria.

== 1980 ==
Date	Opponent	Result	Score	Venue	Competition
1 May 1980	Luxembourg	L	0–1	Medan, Indonesia	International Friendly
23 August 1980	Indonesia	L	1–2	Seoul, South Korea	1980 President's Cup
27 August 1980	South Korea	L	0–4	Daejeon, South Korea	1980 President's Cup
29 August 1980	Malaysia	W	4–1	Seoul, South Korea	1980 President's Cup
31 August 1980	Bahrain	W	1–0	Seoul, South Korea	1980 President's Cup
16 October 1980	Kuwait	W	1–0	Kuala Lumpur, Malaysia	1980 Merdeka Tournament
18 October 1980	Indonesia	D	1–1	Kuala Lumpur, Malaysia	1980 Merdeka Tournament
20 October 1980	Malaysia	D	2–2	Kuala Lumpur, Malaysia	1980 Merdeka Tournament
22 October 1980	Morocco	L	1–2	Kuala Lumpur, Malaysia	1980 Merdeka Tournament
24 October 1980	South Korea	D	0–0	Kuala Lumpur, Malaysia	1980 Merdeka Tournament
28 October 1980	New Zealand	D	1–1	Kuala Lumpur, Malaysia	1980 Merdeka Tournament
28 October 1980	Burma	W	2–1	Kuala Lumpur, Malaysia	1980 Merdeka Tournament
19 November 1980	Indonesia	W	6–0	Bangkok, Thailand	1980 King's Cup
23 November 1980	South Korea	D	0–0	Bangkok, Thailand	1980 King's Cup
1 December 1980	China	W	3–1	Bangkok, Thailand	1980 King's Cup
3 December 1980	South Korea	D	0–0	Bangkok, Thailand	1980 King's Cup

== 1981 ==
Date	Opponent	Result	Score	Venue	Competition
22 April 1981	Kuwait	L	0–6	Kuwait City, Kuwait	1982 FIFA World Cup qualification
24 April 1981	South Korea	L	1–5	Kuwait City, Kuwait	1982 FIFA World Cup qualification
27 April 1981	Malaysia	D	2–2	Kuwait City, Kuwait	1982 FIFA World Cup qualification
16 June 1981	Liechtenstein	W	2–0	Seoul, South Korea	1981 President's Cup
20 June 1981	Indonesia	W	3–1	Seoul, South Korea	1981 President's Cup
22 June 1981	Malta	L	0–2	Seoul, South Korea	1981 President's Cup
1 September 1981	Singapore	W	3–1	Kuala Lumpur, Malaysia	1981 Merdeka Tournament
10 September 1981	Iraq	L	1–7	Kuala Lumpur, Malaysia	1981 Merdeka Tournament
16 September 1981	South Korea	D	1–1	Kuala Lumpur, Malaysia	1981 Merdeka Tournament
9 November 1981	Singapore	W	2–1	Bangkok, Thailand	1981 King's Cup
10 November 1981	South Korea	L	0–1	Bangkok, Thailand	1981 King's Cup
11 November 1981	Pakistan	W	1–0	Bangkok, Thailand	1981 King's Cup
13 November 1981	Indonesia	W	2–0	Bangkok, Thailand	1981 King's Cup
15 November 1981	Malaysia	W	2–0	Bangkok, Thailand	1981 King's Cup
16 November 1981	North Korea	L	0–2	Bangkok, Thailand	1981 King's Cup
17 November 1981	China	L	0–2	Bangkok, Thailand	1981 King's Cup
18 November 1981	India	W	3–1	Bangkok, Thailand	1981 King's Cup
24 November 1981	North Korea	W	2–1(a.e.t.)	Bangkok, Thailand	1981 King's Cup
8 December 1981	Malaysia	D	2–2	Manila, Philippines	1981 Southeast Asian Games – Group A
11 December 1981	Burma	D	3–3	Manila, Philippines	1981 Southeast Asian Games – Group A
13 December 1981	Indonesia	W	2–0	Manila, Philippines	1981 Southeast Asian Games – Semifinals
15 December 1981	Malaysia	W	2–1	Manila, Philippines	1981 Southeast Asian Games – Final

== 1982 ==
Date	Opponent	Result	Score	Venue	Competition
1 May 1982	Singapore	D	1–1	Bangkok, Thailand	1982 King's Cup
4 May 1982	Philippines	W	2–0	Bangkok, Thailand	1982 King's Cup
4 May 1982	China	D	1–1	Bangkok, Thailand	1982 King's Cup
5 May 1982	Indonesia	W	2–0	Bangkok, Thailand	1982 King's Cup
7 May 1982	Nepal	W	3–1	Bangkok, Thailand	1982 King's Cup
8 May 1982	Malaysia	W	3–0	Bangkok, Thailand	1982 King's Cup
9 May 1982	South Korea	L	0–3	Bangkok, Thailand	1982 King's Cup
10 May 1982	Singapore	D	1–1	Bangkok, Thailand	1982 King's Cup
11 May 1982	China	D	1–1	Bangkok, Thailand	1982 King's Cup
11 May 1982	Indonesia	W	2–0	Bangkok, Thailand	1982 King's Cup
13 May 1982	Singapore	W	1–0	Bangkok, Thailand	1982 King's Cup
15 May 1982	Singapore	D	2–2	Bangkok, Thailand	1982 King's Cup
17 May 1982	South Korea	D	0–0(a.e.t.); 4–3(pen.)	Bangkok, Thailand	1982 King's Cup
10 June 1982	Malaysia	D	1–1	Seoul, South Korea	1982 President's Cup
6 August 1982	India	D	0–0	Kuala Lumpur, Malaysia	1982 Merdeka Tournament
11 August 1982	Ghana	L	1–4	Kuala Lumpur, Malaysia	1982 Merdeka Tournament
14 August 1982	Singapore	L	0–2	Kuala Lumpur, Malaysia	1982 Merdeka Tournament
9 October 1982	Indonesia	D	0–0	Kallang, Singapore	1982 Merlion Cup
10 October 1982	Australia	L	0–4	Kallang, Singapore	1982 Merlion Cup
19 November 1982	Saudi Arabia	L	0–1	New Delhi, India	1982 Asian Games – Group A
23 November 1982	Syria	W	3–1	New Delhi, India	1982 Asian Games – Group A
25 November 1982	North Korea	L	0–3	New Delhi, India	1982 Asian Games – Group A

== 1983 ==
Date	Opponent	Result	Score	Venue	Competition
29 May 1983	Indonesia	W	5–0	Kallang, Singapore	1983 Southeast Asian Games – Group B
31 May 1983	Brunei	W	2–1	Kallang, Singapore	1983 Southeast Asian Games – Group B
2 June 1983	Burma	L	0–1	Kallang, Singapore	1983 Southeast Asian Games – Group B
4 June 1983	Malaysia	D	1–1(a.e.t.); 3–0(pen.)	Kallang, Singapore	1983 Southeast Asian Games – Semi-finals
4 June 1983	Nigeria	D	0–0	Seoul, South Korea	1983 President's Cup
6 June 1983	Singapore	W	1–2	Kallang, Singapore	1983 Southeast Asian Games – Final
6 June 1983	South Korea	L	0–4	Suwon, South Korea	1983 President's Cup
8 June 1983	Indonesia	W	3–0	Suwon, South Korea	1983 President's Cup
18 July 1983	Hong Kong	D	1–1; 4–3(pen.)	Beijing, China	1983 Great Wall Cup
19 September 1983	Ghana	L	1–2	Kuala Lumpur, Malaysia	1983 Merdeka Tournament

== 1984 ==
Date	Opponent	Result	Score	Venue	Competition
6 August 1984	Indonesia	L	1–2	Jakarta, Indonesia	1984 AFC Asian Cup qualification
9 August 1984	Philippines	W	3–0	Jakarta, Indonesia	1984 AFC Asian Cup qualification
11 August 1984	Iran	L	0–5	Jakarta, Indonesia	1984 AFC Asian Cup qualification
13 August 1984	Syria	W	3–2	Jakarta, Indonesia	1984 AFC Asian Cup qualification
15 August 1984	Bangladesh	W	2–1	Jakarta, Indonesia	1984 AFC Asian Cup qualification
22 August 1984	Indonesia	L	1–5	Kuala Lumpur, Malaysia	1984 Merdeka Tournament
24 August 1984	Malaysia	L	0–1	Kuala Lumpur, Malaysia	1984 Merdeka Tournament
29 August 1984	Papua New Guinea	L	1–4	Kuala Lumpur, Malaysia	1984 Merdeka Tournament
1 September 1984	Liberia	L	1–2	Kuala Lumpur, Malaysia	1984 Merdeka Tournament
9 October 1984	Saudi Arabia	L	1–2	Jeddah, Saudi Arabia	International Friendly
11 October 1984	Saudi Arabia	W	3–1	Jeddah, Saudi Arabia	International Friendly

== 1985 ==
Date	Opponent	Result	Score	Venue	Competition
15 March 1985	Indonesia	L	0–1	Jakarta, Indonesia	1986 FIFA World Cup qualification
23 March 1985	Bangladesh	W	3–0	Bangkok, Thailand	1986 FIFA World Cup qualification
26 March 1985	India	D	0–0	Bangkok, Thailand	1986 FIFA World Cup qualification
29 March 1985	Indonesia	L	0–1	Bangkok, Thailand	1986 FIFA World Cup qualification
5 April 1985	Bangladesh	L	0–1	Dhaka, Bangladesh	1986 FIFA World Cup qualification
9 April 1985	Indonesia	D	1–1	Calcutta, India	1986 FIFA World Cup qualification
6 June 1985	South Korea	L	2–3	Daejeon, South Korea	1985 President's Cup
8 December 1985	Malaysia	D	1–1	Bangkok, Thailand	1985 Southeast Asian Games – Group B
12 December 1985	Philippines	W	7–0	Bangkok, Thailand	1985 Southeast Asian Games – Group B
15 December 1985	Indonesia	W	7–0	Bangkok, Thailand	1985 Southeast Asian Games – Semi-finals
17 December 1985	Singapore	W	2–0	Bangkok, Thailand	1985 Southeast Asian Games – Final

== 1986 ==
Date	Opponent	Result	Score	Venue	Competition
2 March 1986	North Korea	L	0–2	Bangkok, Thailand	1986 King's Cup
12 March 1986	China	L	0–1	Bangkok, Thailand	1986 King's Cup
23 July 1986	Singapore	L	0–2	Bandar Seri Begawan, Brunei	1986 Brunei Merdeka Games
International Friendly	Iran	L	0–4	Seoul, South Korea	1986 Asian Games – Group A
23 September 1986	United Arab Emirates	L	1–2	Daegu, South Korea	1986 Asian Games – Group A
25 September 1986	Oman	D	0–0	Daegu, South Korea	1986 Asian Games – Group A
27 September 1986	Iraq	L	1–2	Daegu, South Korea	1986 Asian Games – Group A
29 September 1986	Pakistan	W	6–0	Daegu, South Korea	1986 Asian Games – Group A

== 1987 ==
Date	Opponent	Result	Score	Venue	Competition
14 June 1987	South Korea	L	2–4	Daejeon, South Korea	1987 President's Cup
16 June 1987	United States	L	0–1	Jeonju, South Korea	1987 President's Cup
21 July 1987	Singapore	L	0–3	Bandar Seri Begawan, Brunei	1987 Brunei Merdeka Games
22 July 1987	Brunei	D	1–1	Bandar Seri Begawan, Brunei	1987 Brunei Merdeka Games
10 September 1987	Brunei	W	3–1	Jakarta, Indonesia	1987 Southeast Asian Games – Group B
14 September 1987	Indonesia	D	0–0	Jakarta, Indonesia	1987 Southeast Asian Games – Group B
16 September 1987	Malaysia	L	0–2	Jakarta, Indonesia	1987 Southeast Asian Games – Semi-finals
19 September 1987	Burma	W	4–0	Jakarta, Indonesia	1987 Southeast Asian Games – Third place

== 1988 ==
Date	Opponent	Result	Score	Venue	Competition
4 February 1988	United Arab Emirates	L	0–3	Abu Dhabi, United Arab Emirates	1988 AFC Asian Cup qualification
9 February 1988	India	W	1–0	Abu Dhabi, United Arab Emirates	1988 AFC Asian Cup qualification
12 February 1988	Bangladesh	D	1–1	Abu Dhabi, United Arab Emirates	1988 AFC Asian Cup qualification
14 February 1988	China	L	0–5	Abu Dhabi, United Arab Emirates	1988 AFC Asian Cup qualification
16 February 1988	North Yemen	D	3–3	Abu Dhabi, United Arab Emirates	1988 AFC Asian Cup qualification
5 August 1988	Indonesia	L	0–1	Jakarta, Indonesia	1988 Indonesian Independence Cup
10 December 1988	Malaysia	D	0–0	Kuala Lumpur, Malaysia	1988 Merdeka Tournament
12 December 1988	Indonesia	D	0–0	Kuala Lumpur, Malaysia	1988 Merdeka Tournament

== 1989 ==
Date	Opponent	Result	Score	Venue	Competition
19 February 1989	Bangladesh	W	1–0	Bangkok, Thailand	1990 FIFA World Cup qualification
23 February 1989	Iran	L	0–3	Bangkok, Thailand	1990 FIFA World Cup qualification
28 February 1989	China	L	0–3	Bangkok, Thailand	1990 FIFA World Cup qualification
8 March 1989	Bangladesh	L	1–3	Dhaka, Bangladesh	1990 FIFA World Cup qualification
30 May 1989	Iran	L	0–3	Tehran, Iran	1990 FIFA World Cup qualification
29 July 1989	China	L	0–2	Shenyang, China	1990 FIFA World Cup qualification
22 August 1989	Myanmar	W	3–0	Kuala Lumpur, Malaysia	1989 Southeast Asian Games – Group A
24 August 1989	Singapore	D	1–1	Kuala Lumpur, Malaysia	1989 Southeast Asian Games – Group A
28 August 1989	Malaysia	L	0–1	Kuala Lumpur, Malaysia	1989 Southeast Asian Games – Semi-finals
30 August 1989	Indonesia	D	1–1(a.e.t.); 7–8(pen.)	Kuala Lumpur, Malaysia	1989 Southeast Asian Games – Third place
