= 1990 FIFA World Cup qualification – AFC first round =

International football competition

The AFC first round of 1990 FIFA World Cup qualification was decided by a draw which was conducted in Zürich, Switzerland, on 12 December 1987. The round began on 6 January 1989 and finished on 29 July 1989.

The top countries in each group at the end of the stage progressed to the final round, where the six remaining teams competed for the two places at the final tournament.

== Format ==
The Maldives withdrew before the final draw, leaving 25 teams to be divided into 6 groups of 4 or 5 teams each. The teams played against each other on a home-and-away basis, except in Group 4, where the teams played against each other twice but all games were held in South Korea and Singapore. The group winners would advance to the Final Round. Bahrain, India, and South Yemen withdrew after the draw, meaning a total of 22 teams competed.

== Groups ==
=== Group 1 ===
| Team | Pld | W | D | L | GF | GA | GD | Pts | QAT | IRQ | JOR | OMA |
|---|---|---|---|---|---|---|---|---|---|---|---|---|
| Qatar | 6 | 3 | 3 | 0 | 8 | 3 | +5 | 9 | — | 1 – 0 | 1 – 0 | 3 – 0 |
| Iraq | 6 | 3 | 2 | 1 | 11 | 5 | +6 | 8 | 2 – 2 | — | 4 – 0 | 3 – 1 |
| Jordan | 6 | 2 | 1 | 3 | 5 | 7 | −2 | 5 | 1 – 1 | 0 – 1 | — | 2 – 0 |
| Oman | 6 | 0 | 2 | 4 | 2 | 11 | −9 | 2 | 0 – 0 | 1 – 1 | 0 – 2 | — |

6 January 1989

| Qatar | 1–0 | Jordan |
|---|---|---|
| Al-Soufi 21' |

Doha, Qatar
Attendance: 2,859
Referee: Lee Peng Ann (Singapore)
6 January 1989

| Oman | 1–1 | Iraq |
|---|---|---|
| Mahmoud 37' | | Sharif 18' |

Muscat, Oman
Referee: Pratumthong (Thailand)

13 January 1989

| Oman | 0–0 | Qatar |

Muscat, Oman
Referee: Al-Nasir (Saudi Arabia)
13 January 1989

| Jordan | 0–1 | Iraq |
|---|---|---|
| | | Jafar 60' |

Amman, Jordan
Referee: Mandi (Bahrain)

20 January 1989

| Jordan | 2–0 | Oman |
|---|---|---|
| Al-Diabaz 32', 43' |

Amman, Jordan
Referee: Nizar (Syria)
20 January 1989

| Qatar | 1–0 | Iraq |
|---|---|---|
| Al-Soufi 21' |

Doha, Qatar
Attendance: 3,243
Referee: Zhong Bohong (China PR)

27 January 1989

| Jordan | 1–1 | Qatar |
|---|---|---|
| Awad 90' | | Al-Soufi 90' |

Amman, Jordan
Referee: Syed Iqbal (India)
27 January 1989

| Iraq | 3–1 | Oman |
|---|---|---|
| Shihab 33'; Hashim 54'; Radhi 85' | | Nasser 90' |

Baghdad, Iraq
Referee: Bujsaim (United Arab Emirates)

3 February 1989

| Qatar | 3–0 | Oman |
|---|---|---|
| Al-Majid 32'; Al-Soufi 67', 81' |

Doha, Qatar
Referee: Al-Jassas (Kuwait)
3 February 1989

| Iraq | 4–0 | Jordan |
|---|---|---|
| Radhi 26', 42', 66', 80' |

Baghdad, Iraq
Referee: Hi Yacob (Malaysia)

10 February 1989

| Oman | 0–2 | Jordan |
|---|---|---|
| | | Al-Dawoud 49'; Awad 66' |

Muscat, Oman
Referee: Kil Ki-Chul (Korea Republic)
10 February 1989

| Iraq | 2–2 | Qatar |
|---|---|---|
| Radhi 31'; Saeed 75' | | Al-Mehaizaa 18'; Khamis 85' |

Baghdad, Iraq
Referee: Sano (Japan)

=== Group 2 ===
| Team | Pld | W | D | L | GF | GA | GD | Pts | KSA | SYR | NYE | BHR |
|---|---|---|---|---|---|---|---|---|---|---|---|---|
| Saudi Arabia | 4 | 3 | 1 | 0 | 7 | 4 | +3 | 7 | — | 5 – 4 | 1 – 0 | X – X |
| Syria | 4 | 2 | 1 | 1 | 7 | 5 | +2 | 5 | 0 – 0 | — | 2 – 0 | X – X |
| North Yemen | 4 | 0 | 0 | 4 | 0 | 5 | −5 | 0 | 0 – 1 | 0 – 1 | — | X – X |
| Bahrain | 0 | 0 | 0 | 0 | 0 | 0 | 0 | 0 | X – X | X – X | X – X | — |

10 March 1989

| North Yemen | 0 – 1 | Syria |
|---|---|---|
| | (Report) | Mahrous 44' |

Sana'a, North Yemen
Attendance: 45,000
Referee: Hartasardjono (Indonesia)

15 March 1989

| Saudi Arabia | 5 – 4 | Syria |
|---|---|---|
| Al-Bishi 13'; Al-Jam'an 44', 75'; Al-Thunayan 50'; Abdullah 69' | (Report) | Jakalan 30'; Al-Nasser 61'; Helou 70'; Mahrous 85' |

Jeddah, Saudi Arabia
Attendance: 35,000
Referee: Chen Shengcai (China PR)

20 March 1989

| North Yemen | 0 – 1 | Saudi Arabia |
|---|---|---|
| | (Report) | Madani 79' |

Sana'a, North Yemen
Attendance: 45,000
Referee: Abd Rashid Wan Jaafar (Malaysia)

25 March 1989

| Syria | 2 – 0 | North Yemen |
|---|---|---|
| El-Sel 41'; Mahrous 48' | (Report) |

Latakia, Syria
Attendance: 35,000
Referee: Bujsaim (United Arab Emirates)

30 March 1989

| Syria | 0 – 0 | Saudi Arabia |
|---|---|---|
| | (Report) |

Latakia, Syria
Attendance: 50,000
Referee: Takada (Japan)

5 April 1989

| Saudi Arabia | 1 – 0 | North Yemen |
|---|---|---|
| Abdullah 44' | (Report) |

Riyadh, Saudi Arabia
Attendance: 35,000
Referee: Mohammed Saleh Alawi (Oman)

=== Group 3 ===
| Team | Pld | W | D | L | GF | GA | GD | Pts | UAE | KUW | PAK | SYE |
|---|---|---|---|---|---|---|---|---|---|---|---|---|
| United Arab Emirates | 4 | 3 | 0 | 1 | 12 | 4 | +8 | 6 | — | 1 – 0 | 5 – 0 | X – X |
| Kuwait | 4 | 3 | 0 | 1 | 6 | 3 | +3 | 6 | 3 – 2 | — | 2 – 0 | X – X |
| Pakistan | 4 | 0 | 0 | 4 | 1 | 12 | −11 | 0 | 1 – 4 | 0 – 1 | — | X – X |
| South Yemen | 0 | 0 | 0 | 0 | 0 | 0 | 0 | 0 | X – X | X – X | X – X | — |

6 January 1989

| Pakistan | 0 – 1 | Kuwait |
|---|---|---|
| | | Al-Hajeri 5' |

Islamabad, Pakistan
Referee: Syed Iqbal (India)

13 January 1989

| Kuwait | 3 – 2 | United Arab Emirates |
|---|---|---|
| Al-Sovayed 26'; Al-Hasawi 75', 84' | | Bakhit 54', 69' |

Kuwait City, Kuwait
Referee: Takada (Japan)

20 January 1989

| United Arab Emirates | 5 – 0 | Pakistan |
|---|---|---|
| A. Ibrahim 1', 25'; Khalid Ismaïl 64'; Abdulrahman Mohamed 78'; Abdulaziz Mohamed 85' |

Sharjah, United Arab Emirates
Referee: Abu-Ali (Jordan)

27 January 1989

| Kuwait | 2 – 0 | Pakistan |
|---|---|---|
| Al-Hadyah 42', 78' |

Kuwait City, Kuwait
Referee: Al-Sharif (Saudi Arabia)

3 February 1989

| United Arab Emirates | 1 – 0 | Kuwait |
|---|---|---|
| Al-Talyani 62' |

Sharjah, United Arab Emirates
Referee: Jassim Mohammed (Bahrain)

10 February 1989

| Pakistan | 1 – 4 | United Arab Emirates |
|---|---|---|
| Sharafat 81' | | Khalid Ismaïl 7'; A. Ibrahim 26'; Al-Talyani 27'; Abdulaziz Mohamed 70' |

Islamabad, Pakistan
Referee: Nazari (Iran)

=== Group 4 ===
| Team | Pld | W | D | L | GF | GA | GD | Pts | Qualification | KOR | MAS | SIN | NEP | IND |
|---|---|---|---|---|---|---|---|---|---|---|---|---|---|---|
| South Korea | 6 | 6 | 0 | 0 | 25 | 0 | +25 | 12 | | — | 3 – 0 | 3 – 0 | 9 – 0 | X – X |
| Malaysia | 6 | 3 | 1 | 2 | 8 | 8 | 0 | 7 | | 0 – 3 | — | 1 – 0 | 3 – 0 | X – X |
| Singapore | 6 | 2 | 1 | 3 | 12 | 9 | +3 | 5 | | 0 – 3 | 2 – 2 | — | 7 – 0 | X – X |
| Nepal | 6 | 0 | 0 | 6 | 0 | 28 | −28 | 0 | | 0 – 4 | 0 – 2 | 0 – 3 | — | X – X |
| India | 0 | 0 | 0 | 0 | 0 | 0 | 0 | 0 | Withdrew | X – X | X – X | X – X | X – X | — |

23 May 1989

| Malaysia | 2 – 0 | Nepal |
|---|---|---|
| Azizol 2'; Dollah Salleh 90' (pen.) |

Dongdaemun Stadium, Seoul
Attendance: 9,974
Referee: Asgari (Iran)
23 May 1989

| South Korea | 3 – 0 | Singapore |
|---|---|---|
| Hwang Sun-Hong 7', 20'; Chung Hae-won 89' |

Dongdaemun Stadium, Seoul
Attendance: 9,974
Referee: Antonio (Macau)

25 May 1989

| Malaysia | 1 – 0 | Singapore |
|---|---|---|
| Dollah Salleh 61' |

Dongdaemun Stadium, Seoul
Attendance: 8,360
Referee: Chang Jicheng (China PR)
25 May 1989

| South Korea | 9 – 0 | Nepal |
|---|---|---|
| Chung Yong-hwan 1'; Lee Tae-ho 16' (pen.); Choi Sang-kook 24', 48'; Kim Yong-se 29', 83'; Lee Young-jin 38'; Noh Soo-jin 46'; Cho Min-kook 87' |

Dongdaemun Stadium, Seoul
Attendance: 8,360
Referee: Samuel (Hong Kong)

27 May 1989

| Singapore | 3 – 0 | Nepal |
|---|---|---|
| Ahmad Satter 37', 44'; Tay Peng Kee 53' |

Dongdaemun Stadium, Seoul
Attendance: 20,217
Referee: Somogod (Philippines)
27 May 1989

| South Korea | 3 – 0 | Malaysia |
|---|---|---|
| Choi Soon-ho 5'; Hwang Sun-hong 56', 79' |

Dongdaemun Stadium, Seoul
Attendance: 20,217
Referee: Sano (Japan)

3 June 1989

| Singapore | 2 – 2 | Malaysia |
|---|---|---|
| Changatamilman 31'; Salim 38' | | Lim Teong Kim 19'; Dollah Salleh 84' |

National Stadium, Singapore
Attendance: 11,967
Referee: Hartasardjono (Indonesia)
3 June 1989

| South Korea | 4 – 0 | Nepal |
|---|---|---|
| Lee Hak-jong 31'; Park Kyung-hoon 41'; Kim Yong-se 43'; Lee Tae-ho 84' |

National Stadium, Singapore
Attendance: 11,967
Referee: Mahasena (Sri Lanka)

5 June 1989

| South Korea | 3 – 0 | Malaysia |
|---|---|---|
| Hwang Sun-hong 66'; Cho Min-kook 83'; Hwangbo Kwan 87' |

National Stadium, Singapore
Attendance: 7,425
Referee: Al-Malood (Bahrain)
5 June 1989

| Singapore | 7 – 0 | Nepal |
|---|---|---|
| Tokijan 4', 29', 44', 48'; Salim 38'; Devaraj 58', 63' |

National Stadium, Singapore
Attendance: 7,425
Referee: Pratumthong (Thailand)

7 June 1989

| Singapore | 0 – 3 | South Korea |
|---|---|---|
| | | Kim Yong-se 8'; Noh Soo-jin 61', 69' |

National Stadium, Singapore
Attendance: 7,000
Referee: Al-Rahal (Jordan)
7 June 1989

| Malaysia | 3 – 0 | Nepal |
|---|---|---|
| Dollah Salleh 10', 66'; Gunalan 81' |

National Stadium, Singapore
Attendance: 7,000
Referee: Bujsaim (United Arab Emirates)

=== Group 5 ===
| Team | Pld | W | D | L | GF | GA | GD | Pts | CHN | IRN | BAN | THA |
|---|---|---|---|---|---|---|---|---|---|---|---|---|
| China | 6 | 5 | 0 | 1 | 13 | 3 | +10 | 10 | — | 2 – 0 | 2 – 0 | 2 – 0 |
| Iran | 6 | 5 | 0 | 1 | 12 | 5 | +7 | 10 | 3 – 2 | — | 1 – 0 | 3 – 0 |
| Bangladesh | 6 | 1 | 0 | 5 | 4 | 9 | −5 | 2 | 0 – 2 | 1 – 2 | — | 3 – 1 |
| Thailand | 6 | 1 | 0 | 5 | 2 | 14 | −12 | 2 | 0 – 3 | 0 – 3 | 1 – 0 | — |

19 February 1989

| Thailand | 1 – 0 | Bangladesh |
|---|---|---|
| Piyapong 10' |

National Stadium, Bangkok
Referee: Somogod (Philippines)

23 February 1989

| China | 2 – 0 | Bangladesh |
|---|---|---|
| Wang Baoshan 51'; Mai Chao 57' |

Tianhe Stadium, Guangzhou
Attendance: 25,000
Referee: Kim Gwang-Ho (Korea DPR)
23 February 1989

| Thailand | 0 – 3 | Iran |
|---|---|---|
| | | Bavi 12'; Ghayeghran 28'; Garousi 87' |

National Stadium, Bangkok
Attendance: 25,000
Referee: Chan (Hong Kong)

27 February 1989

| Bangladesh | 1 – 2 | Iran |
|---|---|---|
| Aslam 70' | | Bavi 44'; Ansarifard 50' |

Dhaka Stadium, Dhaka
Attendance: 10,879
Referee: Bin Saleh (Oman)

28 February 1989

| Thailand | 0 – 3 | China |
|---|---|---|
| | | Tang Yaodong 55'; Ma Lin 62', 79' |

National Stadium, Bangkok
Attendance: 4,174
Referee: Abdul Latif (Iraq)

4 March 1989

| Bangladesh | 0 – 2 | China |
|---|---|---|
| | | Wang Baoshan 23'; Ma Lin 62' |

Dhaka Stadium, Dhaka
Attendance: 11,946
Referee: Murthi (Singapore)

8 March 1989

| Bangladesh | 3 – 1 | Thailand |
|---|---|---|
| Iqbal 10'; Sabbir 28'; Rupu 76' | | Prasert 79' |

Dhaka Stadium, Dhaka
Attendance: 8,352
Referee: Mohammed Fodah (Saudi Arabia)

17 March 1989

| Iran | 1 – 0 | Bangladesh |
|---|---|---|
| Marfavi 81' |

Azadi Stadium, Tehran
Attendance: 50,000
Referee: Al-Mullah (Qatar)

30 May 1989

| Iran | 3 – 0 | Thailand |
|---|---|---|
| Pious 33', 64'; Garousi 42' |

Azadi Stadium, Tehran
Attendance: 55,000
Referee: Chan (Hong Kong)

15 July 1989

| China | 2 – 0 | Iran |
|---|---|---|
| Liu Haiguang 73'; Zhang Xiaowen 87' |

Shenyang People's Stadium, Shenyang
Attendance: 25,000
Referee: Takada (Japan)

22 July 1989

| Iran | 3 – 2 | China |
|---|---|---|
| Garousi 15'; Eftekhari 16'; Pious 53' | | Mai Chao 64' (pen.); Ma Lin 66' |

Azadi Stadium, Tehran
Attendance: 90,000
Referee: Al-Sharif (Syria)

29 July 1989

| China | 2 – 0 | Thailand |
|---|---|---|
| Jia Xiuquan 2'; Ma Lin 4' |

Shenyang People's Stadium, Shenyang
Attendance: 20,000
Referee: Mandi (Bahrain)

=== Group 6 ===
| Team | Pld | W | D | L | GF | GA | GD | Pts | PRK | JPN | IDN | HKG |
|---|---|---|---|---|---|---|---|---|---|---|---|---|
| North Korea | 6 | 4 | 1 | 1 | 11 | 5 | +6 | 9 | — | 2 – 0 | 2 – 1 | 4 – 1 |
| Japan | 6 | 2 | 3 | 1 | 7 | 3 | +4 | 7 | 2 – 1 | — | 5 – 0 | 0 – 0 |
| Indonesia | 6 | 1 | 3 | 2 | 5 | 10 | −5 | 5 | 0 – 0 | 0 – 0 | — | 3 – 2 |
| Hong Kong | 6 | 0 | 3 | 3 | 5 | 10 | −5 | 3 | 1 – 2 | 0 – 0 | 1 – 1 | — |

21 May 1989

| Indonesia | 0 – 0 | North Korea |

Senayan Stadium, Jakarta
Referee: Murthi (Singapore)

22 May 1989

| Hong Kong | 0 – 0 | Japan |

Hong Kong Stadium, Hong Kong
Attendance: 16,313
Referee: Kil Ki-Chul (Korea Republic)

27 May 1989

| Hong Kong | 1 – 2 | North Korea |
|---|---|---|
| Santos 60' (pen.) | | Kim Kwang-min 3'; Tak Yong-Bin 4' |

Hong Kong Stadium, Hong Kong
Attendance: 16,327
Referee: Ismail Yacob (Malaysia)

28 May 1989

| Indonesia | 0 – 0 | Japan |

Senayan Stadium, Jakarta
Attendance: 80,000
Referee: Salah Karim (Iraq)

4 June 1989

| Hong Kong | 1 – 1 | Indonesia |
|---|---|---|
| Bredbury 31' | | Mustamu 67' |

Hong Kong Stadium, Hong Kong
Attendance: 12,334
Referee: Al-Mulla (United Arab Emirates)
4 June 1989

| Japan | 2 – 1 | North Korea |
|---|---|---|
| Mizunuma 74'; Oh Yong-Nam 88' (o.g.) | | Yun Jong-Su 71' |

Yoyogi National Stadium, Tokyo
Attendance: 35,000
Referee: Mandi (Bahrain)

11 June 1989

| Japan | 5 – 0 | Indonesia |
|---|---|---|
| Horiike 5'; Maeda 16'; Shinto 19'; Hasegawa 24'; Kurosaki 69' |

Nishigaoka National Stadium, Kita, Tokyo
Attendance: 9,000
Referee: Buaboocha (Thailand)

18 June 1989

| Japan | 0 – 0 | Hong Kong |

Universiade Memorial Stadium, Kobe
Attendance: 28,000
Referee: Subramaniam Nathan (Malaysia)

25 June 1989

| Indonesia | 3 – 2 | Hong Kong |
|---|---|---|
| Mustaqim 60'; Kiswanto 74', 89' | | Nang Yan Leung 11', 64' |

Senayan Stadium, Jakarta
Referee: El-Nasir (Saudi Arabia)
25 June 1989

| North Korea | 2 – 0 | Japan |
|---|---|---|
| Kim Pung-Il 36'; Ri Hyok-chon 84' |

Yanggakdo Stadium, Pyongyang
Attendance: 35,000
Referee: Kunalan (Singapore)

2 July 1989

| North Korea | 4 – 1 | Hong Kong |
|---|---|---|
| Ri Hyok-chon 18'; Han Hyong-Il 29'; Kim Pung-Il 80'; Chu Gyong-Sik 86' | | Bredbury 23' |

Yanggakdo Stadium, Pyongyang
Attendance: 28,000
Referee: Wang Xuezhi (China PR)

9 July 1989

| North Korea | 2 – 1 | Indonesia |
|---|---|---|
| Chu Gyong-Sik 40'; Han Hyong-Il 64' | | Lolumbuman 73' |

Yanggakdo Stadium, Pyongyang
Attendance: 35,000
Referee: Nazari (Iran)
