= Mustaqim =

Indonesian footballer and coach

Personal information
- Date of birth: 6 September 1964 (age 62)
- Place of birth: Surabaya, Indonesia
- Height: 1.72 m (5 ft 8 in)
- Position: Striker

Team information
- Current team: Bhayangkara Presisi (assistant manager)

Senior career*
| Years | Team | Apps | (Gls) |
| 1985−1988 | Persebaya Surabaya | 15 | (5) |
| 1988−1990 | Petrokimia Putra | | |
| 1990−1992 | Assyabaab Surabaya | 17 | (4) |
| 1992−1995 | Mitra Surabaya | 17 | (6) |

International career
| 1988–1991 | Indonesia | 19 | (9) |

Managerial career
- 1996–2000: Persebaya Surabaya (assistant)
- 2000–2005: Persela Lamongan
- 2006: Gresik United
- 2007: Mitra Kukar
- 2008–2009: PKT Bontang
- 2010–2011: Mitra Kukar
- 2011–2012: Deltras
- 2013: PS Sumbawa
- 2015: Indonesia U23 (assistant)
- 2016: Persela Lamongan (assistant)
- 2017: PS TNI
- 2018–2019: Persija Jakarta (assistant)
- 2020–2023: Persebaya Surabaya (assistant)
- 2023–2025: Persik Kediri (assistant)
- 2025–: Bhayangkara Presisi (assistant)
- * Club domestic league appearances and goals

Mustaqim (born 6 September 1964) is an Indonesian football manager and former player who played as a striker. He represented the Indonesia national team from 1988 to 1991, scoring 9 goals in 39 matches.

== Club career ==
During his playing career, Mustaqim played for Persebaya Surabaya, Petrokimia Putra, Assyabaab Surabaya and Mitra Surabaya before his retirement in 1995.

== International career ==
Mustaqim made his debut with the Indonesia national team on 22 June 1988 in a 0–4 defeat in the AFC Asian Cup qualification match against South Korea. He netted his first international goal against Thailand two months later, on 5 August, contributing to a 1–0 victory.

== Career statistics ==
=== International ===
Appearances and goals by national team and year
| National team | Year | Apps | Goals |
|---|---|---|---|
| Indonesia | 1988 | 2 | 1 |
| Indonesia | 1989 | 10 | 4 |
| Indonesia | 1990 | 2 | 2 |
| Indonesia | 1991 | 5 | 2 |
| Total | | 19 | 9 |

Scores and results list Indonesia's goal tally first, score column indicates score after each Mustaqim goal.

List of international goals scored by Mustaqim
| No. | Date | Venue | Cap | Opponent | Score | Result | Competition |
|---|---|---|---|---|---|---|---|
| 1 | 5 August 1988 | Gelora Senayan Stadium, Jakarta, Indonesia | 2 | Thailand | 1–0 | 1–0 | Friendly |
| 2 | 25 June 1989 | Gelora Senayan Stadium, Jakarta, Indonesia | 7 | Hong Kong | 1–1 | 3–2 | 1990 FIFA World Cup qualification |
| 3 | 21 August 1989 | Cheras Stadium, Kuala Lumpur, Malaysia | 9 | Brunei | 1–0 | 6–0 | 1989 SEA Games |
| 4 | 21 August 1989 | Cheras Stadium, Kuala Lumpur, Malaysia | 9 | Brunei | 2–0 | 6–0 | 1989 SEA Games |
| 5 | 23 August 1989 | Cheras Stadium, Kuala Lumpur, Malaysia | 10 | Philippines | 5–1 | 5–1 | 1989 SEA Games |
| 6 | 18 August 1990 | Gelora Senayan Stadium, Jakarta, Indonesia | 13 | Singapore | 2–0 | 6–0 | 1990 Independence Cup |
| 7 | 18 August 1990 | Gelora Senayan Stadium, Jakarta, Indonesia | 13 | Singapore | 3–0 | 6–0 | 1990 Independence Cup |
| 8 | 6 February 1991 | Merdeka Stadium, Kuala Lumpur, Malaysia | 15 | Malaysia | 1–0 | 2–1 | 1991 Merdeka Tournament |
| 9 | 6 February 1991 | Merdeka Stadium, Kuala Lumpur, Malaysia | 15 | Malaysia | 2–0 | 2–1 | 1991 Merdeka Tournament |

== Honours ==
Persebaya Surabaya

- Perserikatan: 1987–88

Indonesia

- SEA Games Bronze medal: 1989
