= Kim Kwang-min (footballer, born 1962) =

North Korean footballer and coach (born 1962)

Personal information
- Full name: Kim Kwang-min
- Date of birth: 16 August 1962 (age 64)
- Place of birth: Pyongyang, North Korea
- Height: 1.68 m (5 ft 6 in)
- Position: Defender

International career
Years	Team	Apps	(Gls)
1985–1993	North Korea	27	(4)

Managerial career
- 2007–2011: North Korea (women)
- 2013–2019: North Korea (women)
- 2026–: April 25 (women)

Kim Kwang-min (Korean: 김광민; born 16 August 1962) is a North Korean football coach and former player who played as a defender. He participated with his selection in the final phase of the 1992 Asian Nations Cup, scoring two goals. He is a former coach of the North Korean women's football team and was one the most successful coaches in the team's history, winning one AFC Women's Championship title, two Asian Games gold medals.

== Biography ==
Kim Kwang-min was born in Pyongyang on 16 August 1962.

Very little is known about Kim's is youth club career at the North Korean championship.

He applied to the North Korean national team in 1985, where he participated in the qualifying campaigns for three World Cups in 1986, 1990 and 1994. He was called for the first time on 19 January 1985 to face Singapore

In 1987, he won the title of athletic athlete in recognition of his achievement in winning the DPR Korea team at the 1987 Kings Cup in Thailand.

In 1990, he was part of the North Korean group that participated in the inaugural edition of the Dynasty Cup, which became from 2003 the East Asian Football Cup.

Kim really shows up in the Asian finals as he scores the only two goals in his selection in three games. In 1992, he first opened the scoring against the host country, Japan who manages to equalize ten minutes from the end of the match at the 1992 AFC Asian Cup. It also marks the first goal of the game against the United Arab Emirates, who finally win two goals to one.

Kim scores another goal in the final round of the World Cup qualifiers, against Iraq, who beat 3–2, for what remains the Chollimas' only victory in this final qualifying stage, which they complete. in the last place. He also scored a goal in a friendly match won against Bolivia 2–1 at the 1993 Nehru Cup.

Since 2007, he is the head coach of the North Korean women's team, which he leads in the final stages of the 2007 World Cup in China and 2011 in Germany. The North Koreans reach the quarter-finals at the 2007 edition, the best result achieved by the selection in the World Cup. They also won the 2008 AFC Women's Asian Cup and is on the North Korean bench at the 2008 Summer Olympics football tournament Beijing.

Kim first appeared as manager of April 25 (women) in 2026, taking charge of their inaugural AFC Women's Champions League campaign.

== International goals ==
No.	Date	Venue	Opponent	Score	Result	Competition
1.	31 May 1988	Kathmandu, Nepal	Hong Kong	1–0	1–0	1988 AFC Asian Cup qualification
2.	27 May 1989	Causeway Bay, Hong Kong	Hong Kong	1–0	2–1	1990 FIFA World Cup qualification
3.	1 November 1992	Hiroshima, Japan	Japan	1–0	1–1	1992 AFC Asian Cup
4.	3 November 1992	Hiroshima, Japan	United Arab Emirates	1–0	1–2	1992 AFC Asian Cup
5.	15 October 1993	Doha, Qatar	Iraq	1–2	3–2	1994 FIFA World Cup qualification
