= Abdul Latif Helou =

Syrian footballer (born 1971)

Personal information
- Date of birth: 8 September 1971 (age 55)
- Place of birth: Syria
- Position: Midfielder

International career
Years	Team	Apps	(Gls)
1988–1991	Syria Under-20	7	(3)
1996	Syria	11+	(6)

Abdul Latif Helou (Arabic: عَبْد اللَّطِيف الْحِلُو) is a Syrian football midfielder who played for Syria in the 1996 Asian Cup.

== Career statistics ==
=== International ===
Scores and results list Syria's goal tally first, score column indicates score after each Helou goal.

List of international goals scored by Abdul Latif Helou
No.	Date	Venue	Opponent	Score	Result	Competition
1	15 March 1989	Prince Abdullah Al-Faisal Sports City Stadium, Jeddah, Saudi Arabia	Saudi Arabia	3–4	4–5	1990 FIFA World Cup qualification
2	27 June 1993	Azadi Stadium, Tehran, Iran	Iran	1–1	1–1	1994 FIFA World Cup qualification
3	2 July 1993	Abbasiyyin Stadium, Damascus, Syria	Chinese Taipei	1–0	8–1	1994 FIFA World Cup qualification
4	2 July 1993	Abbasiyyin Stadium, Damascus, Syria	Chinese Taipei	7–1	8–1	1994 FIFA World Cup qualification
5	19 July 1996	Abbasiyyan Stadium, Damascus, Syria	Qatar	1–0	3–1	1996 AFC Asian Cup qualification
6	19 November 1996	???, Kuwait City, Kuwait	Kuwait	2–2	2–2	Friendly

== Honours ==
Individual

- Lebanese Premier League top scorer: 1997–98
