= Tak Yong-bin =

North Korean footballer (born 1962)

Personal information
- Date of birth: 23 July 1962 (age 64)
- Positions: Defender; midfielder

International career
Years	Team	Apps	(Gls)
1985–1993	North Korea	55	(2)
Korean name
Hangul	탁영빈
RR	Tak Yeongbin
MR	T'ak Yŏngbin

Tak Yong-bin (Korean: 탁영빈; born 23 July 1962) is a North Korean former footballer who played as a defender and midfielder. He represented North Korea on at least 55 occasions between 1985 and 1993, scoring twice, and afterwards worked as technical director for the DPR Korea Football Association. He is a recipient of the title People's Athlete, the most prestigious award for North Korean sportspeople.

== Biography ==
Tak was born on 23 July 1962 and grew up in North Korea. Standing at 1.78 metres (5 ft 10 in), he played as a defender and midfielder. He debuted for the North Korea national football team in January 1985 in a draw to Singapore, as part of qualification for the 1986 FIFA World Cup. He played in all four of North Korea's matches during 1986 World Cup qualification, three as a starter and one as a substitute. He appeared in six matches, all friendlies, in 1986.

In 1987, Tak was part of the North Korean team at the 1987 Summer Universiade in Yugoslavia, winning the bronze medal. He appeared in four matches for North Korea as part of the 1988 AFC Asian Cup and in 1989, he made 11 appearances during qualification for the 1990 FIFA World Cup, scoring his first career goal in a win against Hong Kong. In July 1990, he was selected as part of the North Korean team that competed in the North–South Korea unification match, a friendly to promote Korean reunification. He was described as one of three players making up the core of North Korea's attack, and he played in the game as a midfielder. Played before a crowd of 150,000, South Korea scored the first goal through Kim Joo-sung, followed by a North Korean goal at the start of the second half. In the final minute of the game, a South Korean player tripped a North Korean player, resulting in a penalty kick being awarded by the North Korean referee for Tak. Tak made the penalty kick, giving North Korea a 2–1 victory in what remained the last time the two countries played in the North until 2019. Asked about the match by Yonhap News Agency, Tak said that the match itself was not important, but that "We are trying to contribute to unification through the North–South football match." He also told the agency that he thought Choi Soon-ho of the South to be the best Korean football player.

Later in 1990, Tak was part of the North Korean team at the 1990 Asian Games, contributing to his country's silver medal after a loss in the finals to Iran. He appeared in a total of nine matches in 1990 and one in 1991. He appeared three times during the 1992 AFC Asian Cup and played in 13 matches during qualification for the 1994 FIFA World Cup. Tak played for the last time in October 1993 in a loss to South Korea during the World Cup qualification, finishing his national team career with 55 appearances (two as a substitute) and two goals. After his career, he served as technical director for the DPR Korea Football Association. He is a recipient of the title People's Athlete, the most prestigious award for North Korean sportspeople.

== Career statistics ==
=== International ===
National team	Year	Apps	Goals
North Korea	1985	4	0
North Korea	1986	6	0
North Korea	1988	4	0
North Korea	1989	11	1
North Korea	1990	9	1
North Korea	1991	1	0
North Korea	1992	6	0
North Korea	1993	14	0
Total		55	2

=== International goals ===
Scores and results list North Korea's goal tally first, score column indicates score after each North Korea goal.

List of international goals scored by Tak
No.	Date	Venue	Opponent	Score	Result	Competition
1	27 May 1989	Hong Kong Stadium, Causeway Bay, Hong Kong	Hong Kong	2–0	2–1	1990 FIFA World Cup qualification
2	11 October 1990	Rungrado 1st of May Stadium, Pyongyang, North Korea	South Korea	2–1	2–1	Friendly
