= Nampo Stadium =

Sports venue in Nampo, North Korea

Coordinates: 38°44′04″N 125°22′02″E

Nampo Stadium (Chosŏn'gŭl: 남포경기장; Hanja: 南浦競技場) is a multi-purpose stadium in Nampo, North Korea. It is currently used mostly for football matches. The stadium holds 30,000 people and opened in June 1973. The stadium was renovated in 2004, and in 2017

== See also ==
- List of football stadiums in North Korea
