= Han Hyong-il =

North Korean footballer

Personal information
- Date of birth: 1960
- Height: 1.74 m (5 ft 9 in)
- Position: Forward

International career
Years	Team	Apps	(Gls)
1980–1990	North Korea	25	(6)

Managerial career
- 2005–2006: North Korea
Korean name
Hangul	한형일
RR	Han Hyeongil
MR	Han Hyŏngil

Han Hyong-il (Korean: 한형일; born 1960) is a North Korean former footballer. He represented North Korea on at least twenty-five occasions between 1980 and 1990, scoring six times.

== Managerial career ==
Han was appointed head coach of the North Korea national football team in 2005.

== Career statistics ==
=== International ===
National team	Year	Apps	Goals
North Korea	1982	1	3
North Korea	1985	4	1
North Korea	1986	1	0
North Korea	1988	4	0
North Korea	1989	10	2
North Korea	1990	5	0
Total		25	6

=== International goals ===
Scores and results list North Korea's goal tally first, score column indicates score after each North Korea goal.

List of international goals scored by Han
No.	Date	Venue	Opponent	Score	Result	Competition
1	22 November 1982	Jawaharlal Nehru Stadium, New Delhi, India	Thailand	1–0	3–0	1982 Asian Games
2	22 November 1982	Jawaharlal Nehru Stadium, New Delhi, India	Thailand	2–0	3–0	1982 Asian Games
3	22 November 1982	Jawaharlal Nehru Stadium, New Delhi, India	Thailand	3–0	3–0	1982 Asian Games
4	25 May 1985	Nampo Stadium, Nampo, North Korea	Singapore	2–0	2–0	1986 FIFA World Cup qualification
5	2 July 1989	Yanggakdo Stadium, Pyongyang, North Korea	Hong Kong	2–1	4–1	1990 FIFA World Cup qualification
6	9 July 1989	Yanggakdo Stadium, Pyongyang, North Korea	Indonesia	2–0	2–1	1990 FIFA World Cup qualification
