= Ali Eftekhari =

Iranian footballer (born 1964)

Seyed Ali Eftekhari
Personal information
- Full name: Seyed Ali Eftekhari
- Date of birth: January 12, 1964 (age 62)
- Place of birth: Rasht, Iran
- Position: Midfielder

Senior career*
Years	Team	Apps	(Gls)
1983–1991	Esteghlal Rasht		
1990	→ Esteghlal (loan)		
1991–1993	Keshavarz		
1993–1996	Saipa		
1996	Persepolis		
1997	Saipa		
1998	Tiong Bahru United		
1998–1999	Bargh		

International career
1986–1994	Iran	21	(1)

Managerial career
- 2005–2006: Saipa (Assistant)
- 2012–2013: Saipa (Assistant)
Medal record
Representing Iran
Asian Games
Gold medal – first place	1990 Beijing	Team competition
- * Club domestic league appearances and goals

Seyed Ali Eftekhari (Persian: سیدعلی افتخاری; born Jan 12, 1964 in Rasht, Iran) is a former Iranian footballer.
