= Xiannongtan Stadium =

Sports venue in Beijing, China

Coordinates: 39°52′21″N 116°23′23″E

Xiannongtan Stadium (Simplified Chinese: 先农坛体育场) is a multi-use stadium in Beijing, China. It is located in Dongcheng District and is named after Xiannongtan, the Altar of Agriculture, located nearby. This stadium was built in 1936 and was named Beiping Public Stadium (Simplified Chinese: 北平公共体育场). It was renovated between November 1986 to September 1988. The stadium has a capacity of 24,000 and it is used mainly for football matches.

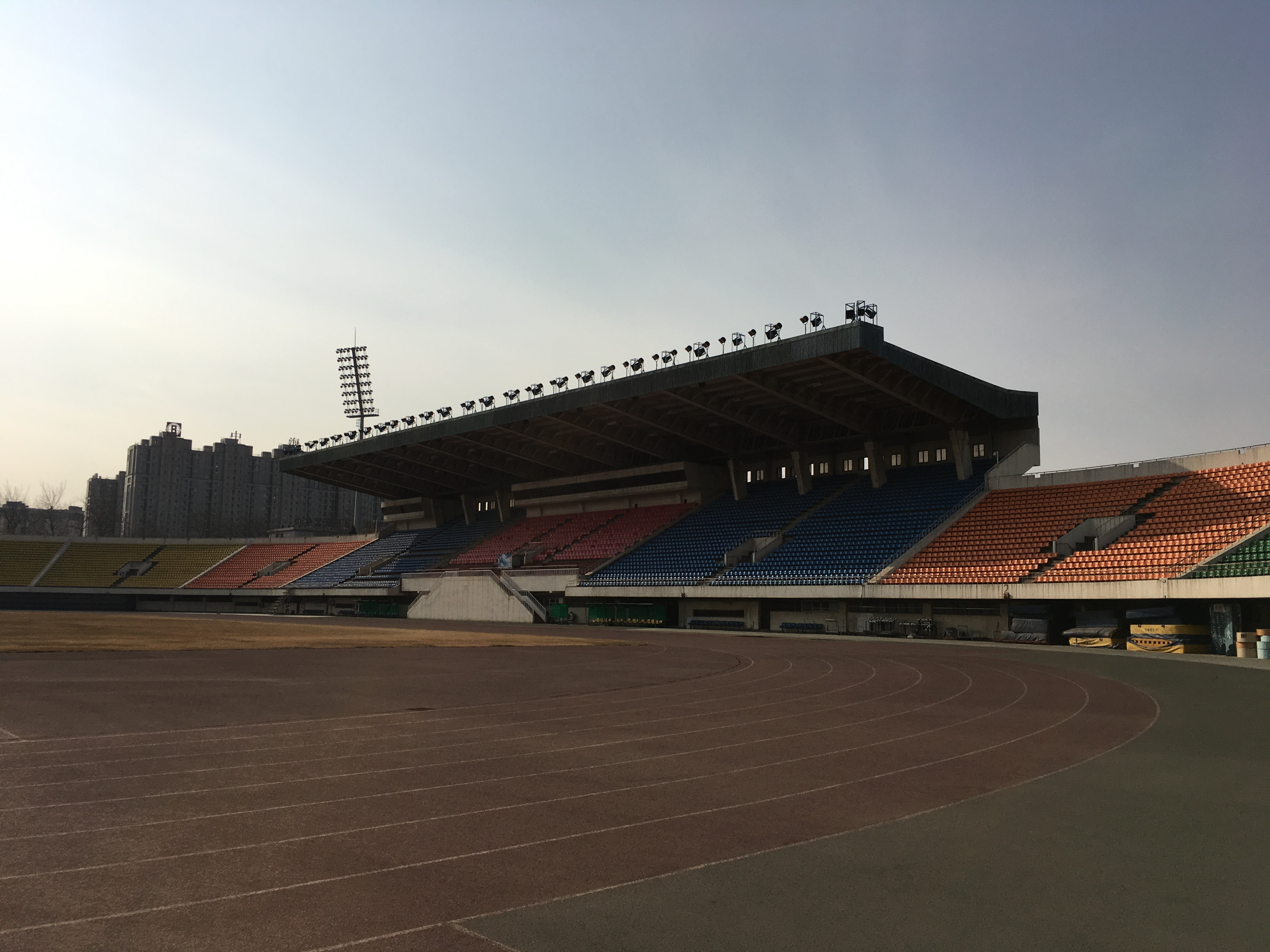
The interior of the Xiannongtan Stadium.

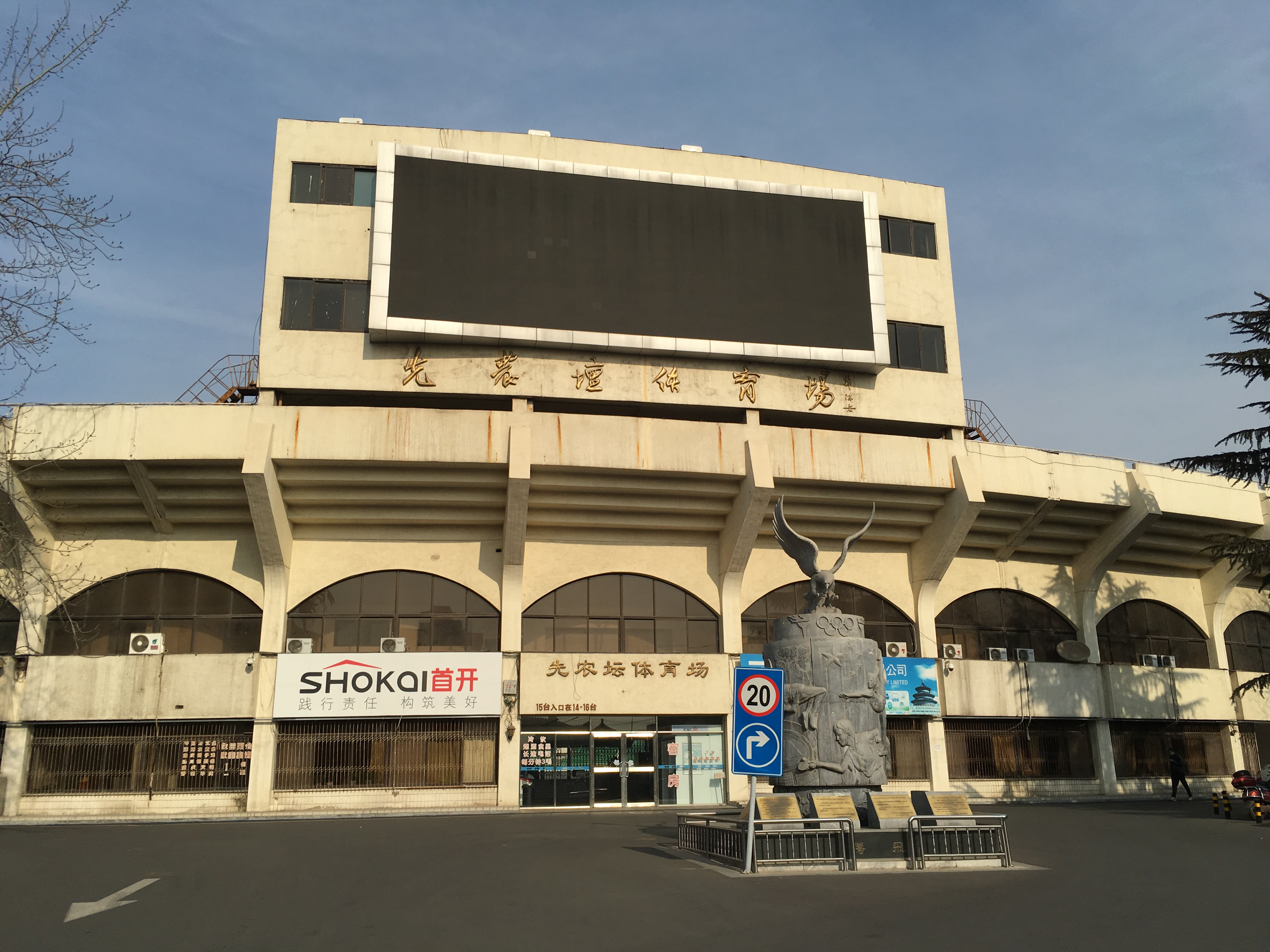
The exterior of the Xiannongtan Stadium.

== See also ==
- List of football stadiums in China
- List of stadiums in China
- Lists of stadiums
