= Yun Jong-su =

North Korean footballer (born 1962)

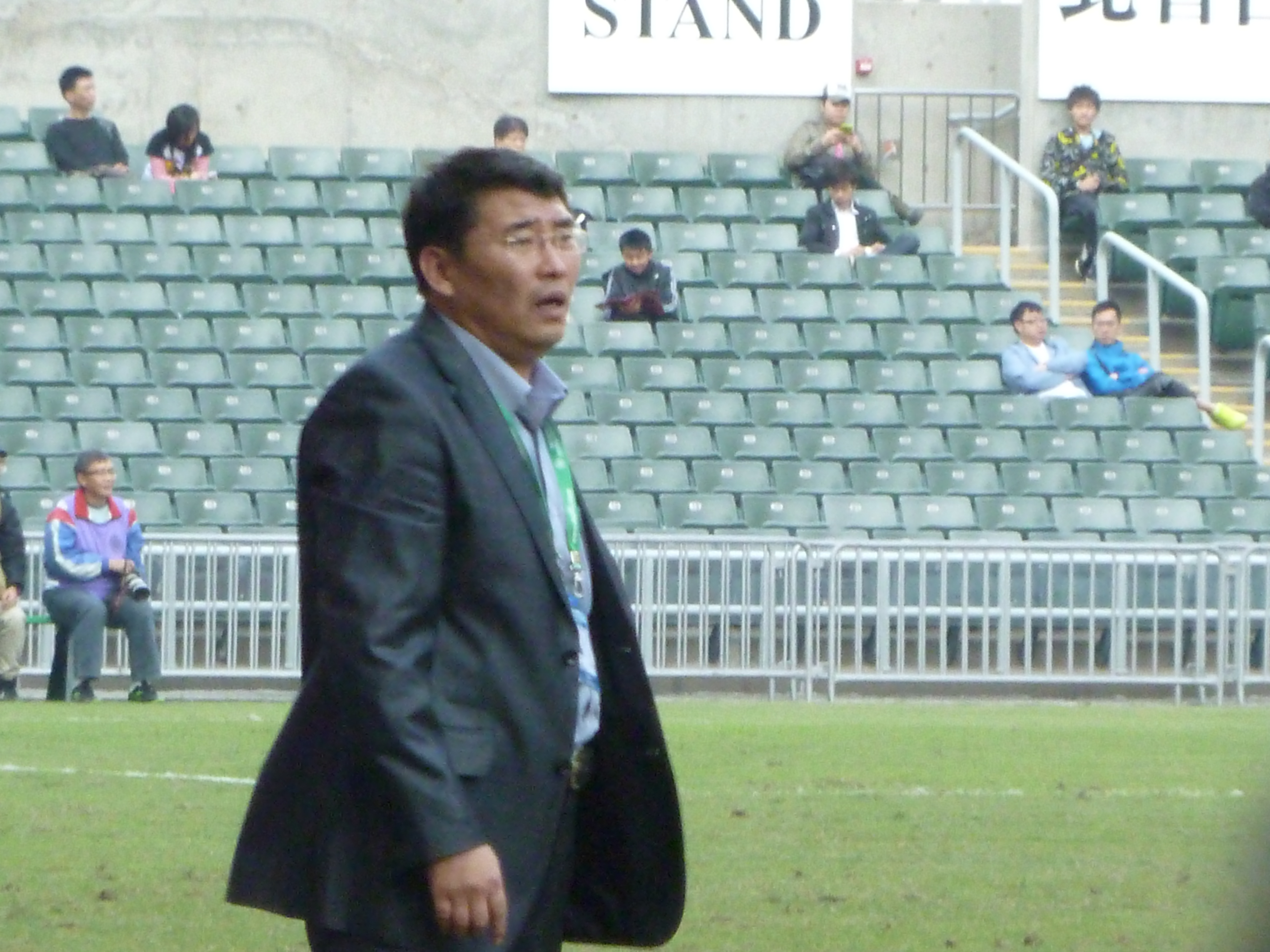
- Yun in 2012

Personal information
- Date of birth: 3 January 1962 (age 64)
- Place of birth: Pyongyang, North Korea
- Position: Midfielder

International career
Years	Team	Apps	(Gls)
1985–1993	North Korea	36	(5)

Managerial career
- 1999–2005: North Korea
- 2008–2010: North Korea U20
- 2011–2014: North Korea
- 2014–2016: North Korea U23
- 2019–2023: North Korea
Medal record
Men's football
Representing North Korea (as manager)
AFC U-19 Championship
Winner	2010
AFC Challenge Cup
Winner	2012

- Yun Jong-su
- Hangul: 윤정수
- Hanja: 尹正水
- RR: Yun Jeongsu
- MR: Yun Chŏngsu

Yun Jong-su (Korean: 윤정수; born 3 January 1962) is a North Korean football coach and former player.

He also led North Korea during the 2006 and 2014 FIFA World Cup qualification campaigns and managed the North Korea U-23 team.

== International goals ==
No.	Date	Venue	Opponent	Score	Result	Competition
1.	3 October 1990	Beijing, China	Thailand	1–0	1–0	1990 Asian Games
