= Hwang Sun-hong =

South Korean football player and manager

- Hwang in 2026

Personal information
- Full name: Hwang Sun-hong
- Date of birth: 14 July 1968 (age 58)
- Place of birth: Yesan, Chungnam, South Korea
- Height: 1.83 m (6 ft 0 in)
- Position: Striker

Team information
- Current team: Daejeon Hana Citizen (manager)

Youth career
- Seoul Yongmoon Middle School
- Seoul Yongmoon High School

College career
Years	Team	Apps	(Gls)
1987–1990	Konkuk University		

Senior career*
Years	Team	Apps	(Gls)
1991–1992	Bayer Leverkusen II	24	(16)
1992–1993	Wuppertaler SV	9	(3)
1993–1998	Pohang Steelers	52	(26)
1998–1999	Cerezo Osaka	36	(30)
2000	Suwon Samsung Bluewings	0	(0)
2000	→ Kashiwa Reysol (loan)	0	(0)
2000–2002	Kashiwa Reysol	34	(12)
2002	Jeonnam Dragons	0	(0)
Total		155	(87)

International career
1996	South Korea U23	4 (Note: Appearances as an overage player (two appearances in Summer Olympics, two appearances in friendlies, including one appearance against non-national team))	(0)
1988–2002	South Korea	103	(50)

Managerial career
- 2008–2010: Busan IPark
- 2011–2015: Pohang Steelers
- 2016–2018: FC Seoul
- 2019: Yanbian Funde
- 2020: Daejeon Hana Citizen
- 2021–2024: South Korea U23
- 2024: South Korea (caretaker)
- 2024–: Daejeon Hana Citizen
Medal record
Men's football
Representing South Korea (as player)
AFC Asian Cup
Runner-up	1988 Qatar
Asian Games
Bronze medal – third place	1990 Beijing
Representing South Korea (as manager)
Asian Games
Gold medal – first place	2022 Hangzhou
- * Club domestic league appearances and goals

- Hwang Sun-hong
- Hangul: 황선홍
- Hanja: 黃善洪
- RR: Hwang Seonhong
- MR: Hwang Sŏnhong

Hwang Sun-hong (born 14 July 1968) is a South Korean football manager and former player. He is currently manager of K League 1 club Daejeon Hana Citizen. During his playing career, he played for the South Korea national team at the 1990, 1994 and 2002 FIFA World Cups.

== Club career ==
After graduating from Konkuk University, Hwang decided not to enter his country's K League and began his senior career in Germany. During his first season as a senior player, he played for the reserve team of Bayer Leverkusen, scoring 16 goals at the Oberliga Nordrhein, Germany's third division at the time.

The next season, Hwang joined 2. Bundesliga side Wuppertaler SV, but he appeared in only nine matches due to a cruciate ligament injury.

Hwang joined K League club POSCO Atoms (currently Pohang Steelers) after returning to South Korea in June 1993. He won two Asian Club Championships with Pohang, whereas he failed to win a K League title. In 1995, he scored in eight consecutive K League matches, setting a record.

In 1998, Hwang moved to J1 League club Cerezo Osaka. At the 1999 J1 League, he scored 24 goals during 25 appearances, becoming the top goalscorer. He is the first South Korean footballer to become the top scorer at a foreign league. That year, he was also nominated for the Asian Footballer of the Year by the Asian Football Confederation. In late 2003, he retired as a player, and started his coaching career.

== International career ==
=== 1990 World Cup ===
An unknown college player, Hwang was suddenly selected for the South Korea national team for the 1988 AFC Asian Cup by manager Lee Hoe-taik. At the tournament, he scored his first and second goals against Japan and Iran respectively.

Hwang was included in the national team for the 1990 FIFA World Cup after showing his outstanding performances including seven goals during the qualifying campaign. However, he had difficulty in performing teamwork, while South Korea lost all three group stage matches at the competition.

=== 1994 World Cup ===
Hwang showed poor performances, with he scoring only one goal in the qualifiers for the 1994 FIFA World Cup. He gradually regained his capability in friendly matches just before the World Cup, but injured his left knee in the last friendly against Honduras. Although he was not in a stable condition, manager Kim Ho used him as a main striker at the competition. He apologised to his teammates after their first group stage match against Spain, where he missed two crucial chances. In the second match against Bolivia, he continuously missed several chances, and South Korea had to face a goalless draw. He scored a goal in the last group stage against defending champions Germany, but the match ended in a 3–2 defeat. After South Korea was eliminated in the group stage, he was severely blamed for his inexact shots against Bolivia by South Korean fans, suffering from social anxiety disorder.

=== 1996 Summer Olympics ===
In contrast with fans' criticism, Hwang was consistently chosen as a striker of the national team by managers. At the 1994 Asian Games, he scored eleven goals in five matches, becoming the tournament's top goalscorer.

Hwang also played for the South Korea under-23 team as an overage player at the 1996 Summer Olympics. He contributed to a victory by winning a crucial penalty in the first match against Ghana, but he quit the tournament due to an injury in the first half of the second match.

Hwang looked forward to the 1998 FIFA World Cup to make up for his failure at the 1994 World Cup, but he was injured by Chinese goalkeeper Jiang Jin in a friendly just before the World Cup. He was excluded from South Korea's line-up during the tournament.

=== 2002 World Cup ===
During the 2001 FIFA Confederations Cup, Hwang won the Bronze Shoe after scoring in two victories over Mexico and Australia.

Hwang was still South Korea's first-choice striker even at the 2002 FIFA World Cup. He scored the opener in the first match against Poland, which ended in a 2–0 win, helping South Korea achieve their first-ever win at the FIFA World Cup. In the second match, a 1–1 draw with the United States, he had injured his head, but won a penalty after wrapping a bandage around his head. In a 5–3 penalty shoot-out win of a quarter-final match against Spain, he scored South Korea's first penalty.

Hwang made 103 appearances and 50 goals for South Korea alongside six operations due to injuries. He ended his international career after the 2002 World Cup.

== Coaching career ==
In 2005, Hwang was appointed as assistant coach of Jeonnam Dragons and started his coaching career. He received Best Coach Award at the 2006 Korean FA Cup. On 4 December 2007, he signed a three-year contract with Busan IPark, becoming their manager.

== Managerial career ==
=== Pohang Steelers ===
On 9 November 2010, Hwang returned to his former team Pohang Steelers as a new manager. He guided Pohang to the second place in the regular season of the 2011 K-League, and a Korean FA Cup title in 2012. He preferred the club's youth players to foreign players, and completed high-quality teamwork nicknamed the "Steel-taka". He became one of the most notable managers in South Korea after winning the K League 1 and the Korean FA Cup simultaneously in 2013.

=== FC Seoul ===
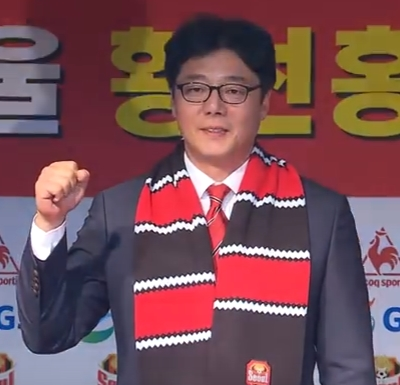
Hwang in 2016

On 21 June 2016, Hwang was appointed manager of another K League 1 club FC Seoul. He successfully finished the rest of the 2016 season by bringing the K League 1 title. However, his discernment in the transfer market was not good and newcomers chosen by him showed poor performances. He was also in severe conflict with veteran players Dejan Damjanović, Osmar and Park Chu-young, failing to control them. Due to his poor results in subsequent seasons, he finally resigned on 30 April 2018.

=== Yanbian Funde ===
On 14 December 2018, Hwang was appointed manager of Yanbian Funde. He left the club after Yanbian Funde were disqualified for the 2019 China League One due to their back taxes in February 2019.

=== Daejeon Hana Citizen ===
K League 2 club Daejeon Citizen were reorganised under the name of Daejeon Hana Citizen by their new owners Hana Financial Group before the 2020 season, and chose Hwang as their first manager on the recommendation of Huh Jung-moo, their director and Hwang's former mentor. Hwang was criticised for his tactics by the board during the season and also came into conflict with Huh. As a result, he left Daejeon in the middle of the season.

=== South Korea U23 ===
Hwang was selected as manager of the South Korea under-23 team in September 2021, but worried a considerable number of Koreans due to his poor results at Seoul and Daejeon. He once again had difficulty bringing a successful outcome by being eliminated in the quarter-finals of the 2022 AFC U-23 Asian Cup after a 3–0 defeat to Japan. Afterwards, he won all seven matches at the 2022 Asian Games, making a chance to rehabilitate himself. He was also appointed interim manager of the senior national team on 27 February 2024. However, his managerial career did not go into reverse, with South Korea failing to qualify for the Olympic football for the first time in 40 years since 1984. His team were eliminated in the U-23 Asian Cup quarter-finals once more after suffering a penalty shoot-out defeat to Indonesia.

=== South Korea ===
In February 2024, Hwang was chosen as South Korea's caretaker manager, replacing Jürgen Klinsmann to prepare for two FIFA World Cup qualifiers against Thailand. Under his short-lived tenure, South Korea were held to a shock 1–1 draw at home, but gained a 3–0 away win.

=== Return to Daejeon ===
On 5 June 2024, Hwang received one more opportunity from Daejeon Hana Citizen, who were promoted to the K League 1 after he left. The continuation of his managerial career caused controversy, but he succeeded in helping them escape the relegation zone that year. The next year, his team finished second at the league, qualifying for the 2026–27 AFC Champions League Elite.

== Career statistics ==
=== Club ===
Appearances and goals by club, season and competition
Club	Season	League			National cup		League cup		Continental		Total	
Club	Season	Division	Apps	Goals	Apps	Goals	Apps	Goals	Apps	Goals	Apps	Goals
Bayer Leverkusen II	1991–92	Oberliga Nordrhein	24	16	—		—		—		24	16
Wuppertaler SV	1992–93	2. Bundesliga	9	3	?	?	—		—		9	3
Pohang Steelers	1993	K League	0	0	—		1	0	—		1	0
Pohang Steelers	1994	K League	14	5	—		0	0	—		14	5
Pohang Steelers	1995	K League	24	11	—		2	0	—		26	11
Pohang Steelers	1996	K League	13	10	0	0	5	3	?	?	18	13
Pohang Steelers	1997	K League	0	0	1	0	1	0	?	?	2	0
Pohang Steelers	1998	K League	1	0	0	0	2	2	?	?	3	2
Pohang Steelers	Total		52	26	1	0	11	5	?	?	64	31
Cerezo Osaka	1998	J1 League	11	6	?	?	0	0	—		11	6
Cerezo Osaka	1999	J1 League	25	24	?	?	2	3	—		27	27
Cerezo Osaka	Total		36	30	?	?	2	3	—		38	33
Suwon Samsung Bluewings	2000	K League	0	0	0	0	1	0			1	0
Kashiwa Reysol	2000	J1 League	6	1	?	?	1	0	—		7	1
Kashiwa Reysol	2001	J1 League	21	10	?	?	4	0	—		25	10
Kashiwa Reysol	2002	J1 League	7	1	?	?	0	0	—		7	1
Kashiwa Reysol	Total		34	12	?	?	5	0	—		39	12
Jeonnam Dragons	2002	K League	0	0	0	0	0	0	—		0	0
Career total			155	87	1	0	19	8	?	?	175	95

=== International ===
Appearances and goals by national team and year
National team	Year	Apps	Goals
South Korea
South Korea	1988	5	2
South Korea	1989	12	8
South Korea	1990	17	6
South Korea	1993	6	1
South Korea	1994	17	16
South Korea	1995	3	1
South Korea	1996	10	8
South Korea	1998	8	3
South Korea	1999	5	0
South Korea	2000	2	0
South Korea	2001	7	2
South Korea	2002	11	3
Total		103	50

Results list South Korea's goal tally first.

List of international goals scored by Hwang Sun-hong
No.	Date	Venue	Cap	Opponent	Score	Result	Competition
1	6 December 1988	Doha, Qatar	1	Japan	1–0	2–0	1988 AFC Asian Cup
2	11 December 1988	Doha, Qatar	3	Iran	2–0	3–0	1988 AFC Asian Cup
3	23 May 1989	Seoul, South Korea	6	Singapore	1–0	3–0	1990 FIFA World Cup qualification
4	23 May 1989	Seoul, South Korea	6	Singapore	2–0	3–0	1990 FIFA World Cup qualification
5	27 May 1989	Seoul, South Korea	7	Malaysia	2–0	3–0	1990 FIFA World Cup qualification
6	27 May 1989	Seoul, South Korea	7	Malaysia	3–0	3–0	1990 FIFA World Cup qualification
7	5 June 1989	Singapore	8	Malaysia	1–0	3–0	1990 FIFA World Cup qualification
8	14 August 1989	Los Angeles, United States	11	United States	2–0	2–1	1989 Marlboro Cup
9	16 October 1989	Singapore	14	North Korea	1–0	1–0	1990 FIFA World Cup qualification
10	25 October 1989	Singapore	16	Saudi Arabia	2–0	2–0	1990 FIFA World Cup qualification
11	4 February 1990	Ta' Qali, Malta	18	Norway	1–0	2–3	Friendly
12	27 July 1990	Beijing, China	23	Japan	1–0	2–0	1990 Dynasty Cup
13	25 September 1990	Beijing, China	29	Pakistan	1–0	7–0	1990 Asian Games
14	25 September 1990	Beijing, China	29	Pakistan	2–0	7–0	1990 Asian Games
15	25 September 1990	Beijing, China	29	Pakistan	7–0	7–0	1990 Asian Games
16	23 October 1990	Seoul, South Korea	34	North Korea	1–0	1–0	Friendly
17	28 October 1993	Doha, Qatar	40	North Korea	2–0	3–0	1994 FIFA World Cup qualification
18	26 February 1994	Los Angeles, United States	42	Colombia	2–0	2–2	Friendly
19	4 May 1994	Changwon, South Korea	44	Cameroon	2–1	2–1	Friendly
20	11 June 1994	Duncanville, United States	46	Honduras	2–0	3–0	Friendly
21	27 June 1994	Dallas, United States	49	Germany	1–3	2–3	1994 FIFA World Cup
22	13 September 1994	Seoul, South Korea	51	Ukraine	2–0	2–0	Friendly
23	1 October 1994	Hiroshima, Japan	53	Nepal	2–0	11–0	1994 Asian Games
24	1 October 1994	Hiroshima, Japan	53	Nepal	3–0	11–0	1994 Asian Games
25	1 October 1994	Hiroshima, Japan	53	Nepal	4–0	11–0	1994 Asian Games
26	1 October 1994	Hiroshima, Japan	53	Nepal	6–0	11–0	1994 Asian Games
27	1 October 1994	Hiroshima, Japan	53	Nepal	7–0	11–0	1994 Asian Games
28	1 October 1994	Hiroshima, Japan	53	Nepal	9–0	11–0	1994 Asian Games
29	1 October 1994	Hiroshima, Japan	53	Nepal	10–0	11–0	1994 Asian Games
30	1 October 1994	Hiroshima, Japan	53	Nepal	11–0	11–0	1994 Asian Games
31	5 October 1994	Hiroshima, Japan	54	Oman	2–0	2–1	1994 Asian Games
32	11 October 1994	Hiroshima, Japan	56	Japan	2–1	3–2	1994 Asian Games
33	11 October 1994	Hiroshima, Japan	56	Japan	3–2	3–2	1994 Asian Games
34	31 October 1995	Seoul, South Korea	60	Saudi Arabia	1–0	1–1	Friendly
35	19 March 1996	Dubai, United Arab Emirates	62	United Arab Emirates	2–3	2–3	1996 Dubai Tournament
36	30 April 1996	Tel Aviv, Israel	65	Israel	4–0	5–4	Friendly
37	30 April 1996	Tel Aviv, Israel	65	Israel	5–0	5–4	Friendly
38	23 November 1996	Suwon, South Korea	66	Colombia	1–0	4–1	Friendly
39	23 November 1996	Suwon, South Korea	66	Colombia	2–0	4–1	Friendly
40	4 December 1996	Abu Dhabi, United Arab Emirates	68	United Arab Emirates	1–0	1–1	1996 AFC Asian Cup
41	7 December 1996	Abu Dhabi, United Arab Emirates	69	Indonesia	2–0	4–2	1996 AFC Asian Cup
42	7 December 1996	Abu Dhabi, United Arab Emirates	69	Indonesia	3–0	4–2	1996 AFC Asian Cup
43	1 April 1998	Seoul, South Korea	71	Japan	2–1	2–1	Friendly
44	22 April 1998	Belgrade, FR Yugoslavia	74	FR Yugoslavia	1–0	1–3	Friendly
45	27 May 1998	Seoul, South Korea	77	Czech Republic	1–2	2–2	Friendly
46	1 June 2001	Ulsan, South Korea	88	Mexico	1–0	2–1	2001 FIFA Confederations Cup
47	3 June 2001	Suwon, South Korea	89	Australia	1–0	1–0	2001 FIFA Confederations Cup
48	20 March 2002	Cartagena, Spain	94	Finland	1–0	2–0	Friendly
49	20 March 2002	Cartagena, Spain	94	Finland	2–0	2–0	Friendly
50	4 June 2002	Busan, South Korea	98	Poland	1–0	2–0	2002 FIFA World Cup

== Honours ==
=== Player ===
Pohang Steelers

- Korean FA Cup: 1996
- Korean League Cup: 1993
- Asian Club Championship: 1996–97, 1997–98

South Korea

- AFC Asian Cup runner-up: 1988
- Asian Games bronze medal: 1990
- Dynasty Cup: 1990

Individual

- Korean FA Best XI: 1988
- Asian Games top goalscorer: 1994
- K League All-Star: 1995
- K League 1 Best XI: 1995
- J.League All-Star: 1999
- J1 League top goalscorer: 1999
- J1 League Best XI: 1999
- FIFA Confederations Cup Bronze Shoe: 2001
- K League '90s All-Star Team: 2003
- K League 30th Anniversary Best XI: 2013

=== Manager ===
Busan IPark

- Korean FA Cup runner-up: 2010
- Korean League Cup runner-up: 2009

Pohang Steelers

- K League 1: 2013
- Korean FA Cup: 2012, 2013

FC Seoul

- K League 1: 2016
- Korean FA Cup runner-up: 2016

South Korea U23

- Asian Games: 2022

Individual

- Korean FA Cup Best Manager: 2012
- K League 1 Manager of the Year: 2013, 2016
- K League Manager of the Month: April 2014, September 2015, October 2016, February/March 2025, October 2025
- K League All-Star: 2014, 2017

== See also ==
- List of men's footballers with 100 or more international caps
- List of men's footballers with 50 or more international goals
