= Hwangbo Kwan =

South Korean footballer and manager (born 1965)

Personal information
- Full name: Hwangbo Kwan
- Date of birth: 1 March 1965 (age 61)
- Place of birth: Daegu, South Korea
- Height: 1.78 m (5 ft 10 in)
- Position: Attacking midfielder

College career
Years	Team	Apps	(Gls)
1984–1987	Seoul National University		

Senior career*
Years	Team	Apps	(Gls)
1988–1995	Yukong Elephants	171	(44)
1996–1997	Oita Trinity	54	(27)
Total		225	(71)

International career
1987	South Korea B		
1988–1993	South Korea	37	(10)

Managerial career
- 2004: Oita Trinita (assistant)
- 2005: Oita Trinita
- 2010: Oita Trinita
- 2011: FC Seoul
Medal record
Representing South Korea
Men's football
AFC Asian Cup
Silver medal – second place	1988 Qatar	Team
Asian Games
Bronze medal – third place	1990 Beijing	Team
- * Club domestic league appearances and goals

- Hwangbo Kwan
- Hangul: 황보 관
- Hanja: 皇甫 官
- RR: Hwangbo Gwan
- MR: Hwangbo Kwan

Hwangbo Kwan (Korean: 황보관; born 1 March 1965) is a South Korean football manager and former player. He is famous for his long-range goal against Spain in the 1990 FIFA World Cup.

== Career statistics ==
=== International ===
Results list South Korea's goal tally first.

List of international goals scored by Hwangbo Kwan
No.	Date	Venue	Opponent	Score	Result	Competition
1	5 June 1989	Singapore	Malaysia	3–0	3–0	1990 FIFA World Cup qualification
2	10 August 1989	Los Angeles, United States	Mexico	1–3	2–4	Friendly
3	10 August 1989	Los Angeles, United States	Mexico	2–3	2–4	Friendly
4	25 October 1989	Singapore	Saudi Arabia	1–0	2–0	1990 FIFA World Cup qualification
5	28 October 1989	Singapore	United Arab Emirates	1–0	1–1	1990 FIFA World Cup qualification
6	10 February 1990	Ta' Qali, Malta	Malta	2–0	2–1	Friendly
7	17 June 1990	Udine, Italy	Spain	1–1	1–3	1990 FIFA World Cup
8	29 July 1990	Beijing, China	North Korea	1–0	1–0	1990 Dynasty Cup
9	5 October 1990	Beijing, China	Thailand	1–0	1–0	1990 Asian Games
10	7 June 1993	Seoul, South Korea	Lebanon	2–0	2–0	1994 FIFA World Cup qualification

== Managerial statistics ==
Managerial record by team and tenure
Team	From	To	Record				
Team	From	To	P	W	D	L	Win %
Oita Trinita	6 December 2004	28 August 2005	27	6	7	14	22.22
Oita Trinita	16 December 2009	30 November 2010	36	10	11	15	27.78
Total			63	16	18	29	25.40

== Honours ==
Yukong Elephants

- K League 1: 1989
- Korean League Cup: 1994

South Korea

- AFC Asian Cup runner-up: 1988
- Asian Games bronze medal: 1990
- Dynasty Cup: 1990

Individual

- K League Rookie of the Year: 1988
- K League 1 Best XI: 1988, 1994
- Korean FA Best XI: 1988
- K League All-Star: 1991, 1992, 1995
- K League '90s All-Star Team: 2003
