= D. Tokijan =

Singaporean footballer and coach (1963–2025)

Personal information
- Full name: Darimosuvito Tokijan
- Date of birth: 14 February 1963
- Place of birth: State of Singapore
- Date of death: 23 December 2025 (aged 62)
- Position: Midfielder

Senior career*
Years	Team	Apps	(Gls)
1984–1989	Singapore FA	52	(4)
- Jurong Town

International career
1984–1992	Singapore	23	(11)
- * Club domestic league appearances and goals

Darimosuvito Tokijan (14 February 1963 – 23 December 2025), more commonly known as D. Tokijan, was a Singaporean football midfielder who played for Singapore in the 1984 Asian Cup. He also played for Jurong Town and Singapore FA.

After retiring, Tokijan had been a football coach. He was the Geylang United Prime League team head coach in 2007, having spent the previous five years as coach of SAFSA. He was the assistant coach for Tanjong Pagar United until the end of 2013 season. In 2014, Tokijan was appointed assistant coach to Marko Kraljević in Balestier Khalsa, and was also responsible as the head coach of their Prime League squad.

Tokijan died on 23 December 2025 at the age of 62.
