= 1988 AFC Asian Cup qualification =

Tournament details
- Dates: 4 February 1988 – 22 June 1988
- Teams: 20 (from 1 confederation)

Qualification for the Asian Football Confederation's 1988 AFC Asian Cup finals held in Qatar between 2 and 18 December. Saudi Arabia defeated Republic of Korea in the final match in Doha.

== Groups ==
Group 1	Group 2	Group 3	Group 4
Bangladesh; China; India; North Yemen; Thailand; United Arab Emirates	~~Iraq~~ * Japan (Note: Japan entered the 1988 AFC Asian Cup and its qualifiers with a B team, made up mostly of university players, as the Japan Football Association kept the senior national team players at home for domestic league and cup competitions.); Jordan; Kuwait; Malaysia; Pakistan	Hong Kong; Iran; Nepal; North Korea; ~~Singapore~~ * Syria	Bahrain; ~~Burma~~ * Indonesia; ~~Oman~~ * South Korea; South Yemen

- * Withdrew

== Qualification ==
=== Group 1 ===
- All matches played in United Arab Emirates.

Team	Pts	Pld	W	D	L	GF	GA	GD
United Arab Emirates	9	5	4	1	0	12	1	+11
China	8	5	3	2	0	10	0	+10
North Yemen	5	5	1	3	1	5	5	0
Thailand	4	5	1	2	2	5	12	–7
Bangladesh	3	5	0	3	2	1	9	–8
India	1	5	0	1	4	0	6	–6

4 February 1988

United Arab Emirates	3–0	Thailand

Abu Dhabi, United Arab Emirates

5 February 1988

China	0–0	North Yemen

Abu Dhabi, United Arab Emirates

6 February 1988

Bangladesh	0–0	India
	Report

Abu Dhabi, United Arab Emirates

7 February 1988

United Arab Emirates	2–1	North Yemen

Abu Dhabi, United Arab Emirates

8 February 1988

China	4–0	Bangladesh

Abu Dhabi, United Arab Emirates

9 February 1988

India	0–1	Thailand

Abu Dhabi, United Arab Emirates

10 February 1988

United Arab Emirates	0–0	China

Abu Dhabi, United Arab Emirates

11 February 1988

North Yemen	1–0	India
Mohammed Al Sharani 83'

Abu Dhabi, United Arab Emirates

12 February 1988

Thailand	1–1	Bangladesh
Natee Thongsookkaew 50'		Ahmed Ali 44'

Abu Dhabi, United Arab Emirates

13 February 1988

United Arab Emirates	3–0	India
Khamees 59'; Mohamed 63'; Al Talyani 67'	Report

Abu Dhabi, United Arab Emirates

14 February 1988

China	5–0	Thailand

Abu Dhabi, United Arab Emirates

14 February 1988

North Yemen	0–0	Bangladesh

Abu Dhabi, United Arab Emirates

16 February 1988

China	1–0	India
Liu Haiguang 30'	Report

Abu Dhabi, United Arab Emirates

16 February 1988

North Yemen	3–3	Thailand

Abu Dhabi, United Arab Emirates

17 February 1988

United Arab Emirates	4–0	Bangladesh

Abu Dhabi, United Arab Emirates

=== Group 2 ===
- All matches played in Malaysia.
- Iraq were originally drawn in this group, but they withdrew on 6 April 1988 in protest at the AFC changing the fixtures schedule at late notice.

Team	Pts	Pld	W	D	L	GF	GA	GD
Kuwait	7	4	3	1	0	9	0	+9
Japan	5	4	2	1	1	6	3	+3
Jordan	5	4	1	3	0	2	1	+1
Malaysia	3	4	1	1	2	4	6	–2
Pakistan	0	4	0	0	4	1	12	–11

7 April 1988

Malaysia	4–0	Pakistan
Mat Din 49'; Hassan 79', 80'; Salleh 84'	Report

Kuala Lumpur, Malaysia

8 April 1988

Kuwait	1–0	Japan

Kuala Lumpur, Malaysia

10 April 1988

Jordan	1–0	Pakistan
Al-Turk 44'	Report

Kuala Lumpur, Malaysia

11 April 1988

Malaysia	0–1	Japan

Kuala Lumpur, Malaysia

12 April 1988

Kuwait	0–0	Jordan

Kuala Lumpur, Malaysia

14 April 1988

Malaysia	0–0	Jordan

Kuala Lumpur, Malaysia

15 April 1988

Kuwait	3–0	Pakistan
Al-Haddad (?); Al-Anezi (?); Hussain (?)	Report

Kuala Lumpur, Malaysia

16 April 1988

Japan	1–1	Jordan

Kuala Lumpur, Malaysia

18 April 1988

Malaysia	0–5	Kuwait

Kuala Lumpur, Malaysia

18 April 1988

Japan	4–1	Pakistan
Maeda 3'; Oenoki 37'; Matsuyama 69'; Minoguchi 88'	Report	Sarwar 63'

Kuala Lumpur, Malaysia

=== Group 3 ===
- All matches played in Nepal.

Team	Pts	Pld	W	D	L	GF	GA	GD
Syria	7	4	3	1	0	8	2	+6
Iran	6	4	2	2	0	6	1	+5
North Korea	5	4	2	1	1	3	2	+1
Hong Kong	1	4	0	1	3	0	5	–5
Nepal	1	4	0	1	3	0	7	–7

25 May 1988

Nepal	0–0	Hong Kong

Dasarath Rangasala Stadium, Kathmandu

26 May 1988

Syria	2–1	North Korea
Al Nasser 28'; Kareghli 90'		Kang Myong-sam 45'

Dasarath Rangasala Stadium, Kathmandu

27 May 1988

Iran	2–0	Hong Kong
Ghayeghran 9'; Marfavi 73'

Dasarath Rangasala Stadium, Kathmandu
Referee: Xu Bingsheng (China)

27 May 1988

Nepal	0–1	North Korea
		Ju Kyong-shik 52'

Dasarath Rangasala Stadium, Kathmandu

29 May 1988

Syria	1–1	Iran
Siflan 13'		Bavi 73'

Dasarath Rangasala Stadium, Kathmandu
Referee: Abdulaziz Mohamed (United Arab Emirates)

31 May 1988

North Korea	1–0	Hong Kong
Kim Kwang-min 22'

Dasarath Rangasala Stadium, Kathmandu

1 June 1988

Nepal	0–3	Syria
		unknown Ahmed 23'; Al Nasser 65'

Dasarath Rangasala Stadium, Kathmandu

2 June 1988

Iran	0–0	North Korea

Dasarath Rangasala Stadium, Kathmandu
Referee: Abdulaziz Mohamed (United Arab Emirates)

3 June 1988

Syria	2–0	Hong Kong
Kardeghli 48'; Mahrous 73'

Dasarath Rangasala Stadium, Kathmandu

4 June 1988

Nepal	0–3	Iran
		Bavi 6', 53', 67'

Dasarath Rangasala Stadium, Kathmandu
Referee: Abdulaziz Mohamed (United Arab Emirates)

=== Group 4 ===
- All matches played in Indonesia.

Team	Pts	Pld	W	D	L	GF	GA	GD
Bahrain	5	3	2	1	0	4	0	+4
South Korea	3	3	1	1	1	5	3	+2
Indonesia	3	3	1	1	1	1	4	–3
South Yemen	1	3	0	1	2	1	4	–3

17 June 1988

Indonesia	1–0	South Yemen

Jakarta, Indonesia

17 June 1988

Bahrain	2–0	South Korea

Jakarta, Indonesia

19 June 1988

South Korea	1–1	South Yemen

Jakarta, Indonesia

19 June 1988

Indonesia	0–0	Bahrain

Jakarta, Indonesia

22 June 1988

Bahrain	2–0	South Yemen

Jakarta, Indonesia

22 June 1988

Indonesia	0–4	South Korea

Jakarta, Indonesia

== Qualified teams ==
Team	Qualified as	Qualified on	Previous appearance
Qatar	Hosts	N/A	2 (1980, 1984)
Saudi Arabia	1984 AFC Asian Cup champions	16 December 1984	1 (1984)
United Arab Emirates	Group 1 winners	17 February 1988	1 (1980, 1984)
China	Group 1 runners-up	16 February 1988	3 (1976, 1980, 1984)
Kuwait	Group 2 winners	18 April 1988	4 (1972, 1976, 1980, 1984)
Japan	Group 2 runners-up	18 April 1988	0 (debut)
Syria	Group 3 winners	3 June 1988	2 (1980, 1984)
Iran	Group 3 runners-up	4 June 1988	5 (1968, 1972, 1976, 1980, 1984)
Bahrain	Group 4 winners	22 June 1988	0 (debut)
South Korea	Group 4 runners-up	22 June 1988	6 (1956, 1960, 1964, 1972, 1980, 1984)
