= 1976 AFC Asian Cup squads =

Squads for the 1976 AFC Asian Cup played in Iran.

== Group A ==
=== China ===
Head coach: (China) Nian Weisi

No.	Pos.	Player	Date of birth (age)	Club
1	GK	Hu Zhigang	29 February 1944 (aged 32)	(Chinese Football Association) Shanghai
2	DF	Qi Wusheng (c)	20 May 1944 (aged 32)	(Chinese Football Association) Liaoning
3	DF	Guan Zhirui	12 April 1953 (aged 23)	(Chinese Football Association) Guangdong
4	MF	Chi Shangbin	19 September 1949 (aged 26)	(Chinese Football Association) Liaoning
5	DF	Xiang Hengqing	15 July 1947 (aged 28)	(Chinese Football Association) Shandong
6	MF	He Jia	1953	(Chinese Football Association) Guangdong
7	MF	Chen Xirong	1953	(Chinese Football Association) Guangdong
8	MF	Li Guoning	1942	(Chinese Football Association) Fujian
9	FW	Wang Jilian	15 February 1946 (aged 30)	(Chinese Football Association) Bayi Football Team
10	FW	Rong Zhixing	30 July 1948 (aged 27)	(Chinese Football Association) Guangdong
11	MF	Du Zhiren	1953	(Chinese Football Association) Guangdong
12	GK	Li Fusheng	4 January 1953 (aged 23)	(Chinese Football Association) Bayi Football Team
13	DF	Cai Jinbiao	1954	(Chinese Football Association) Guangdong
14	MF	Zhang Qun	25 June 1950 (aged 25)	(Chinese Football Association) Bayi Football Team
15	FW	Zhang Yiming	1948	(Chinese Football Association) Liaoning
16	DF	Yang Anli	7 May 1950 (aged 26)	(Chinese Football Association) Bayi Football Team
17	FW	Yu Jinglian	5 March 1953 (aged 23)	(Chinese Football Association) Liaoning
18	FW	Li Weimiao	31 March 1950 (aged 26)	(Chinese Football Association) Beijing

=== Kuwait ===
Head coach: (Brazil) Mário Zagallo

No.	Pos.	Player	Date of birth (age)	Club
1	GK	Ahmed Al-Tarabulsi	22 March 1947 (aged 29)	(Kuwait Football Association) Kuwait SC
20	GK	Sanad Sihan		(Kuwait Football Association) Kazma SC
3	DF	Mahboub Juma'a	17 September 1955 (aged 20)	(Kuwait Football Association) Al Salmiya
2	DF	Adnan Abdullah		(Kuwait Football Association) Al-Arabi SC
13	DF	Redha Maarafi		(Kuwait Football Association) Al Qadisiya
4	DF	Hussein Mohammad		(Kuwait Football Association) Kazma SC
14	DF	Abdullah Mayouf	3 December 1953 (aged 22)	(Kuwait Football Association) Kazma SC
5	DF	Ibrahim Duraihem (c)		(Kuwait Football Association) Kuwait SC
8	MF	Farouq Ibrahim		(Kuwait Football Association) Al Qadisiya
11	MF	Hamad Bouhamad		(Kuwait Football Association) Al Qadisiya
6	MF	Saad Al-Houti	24 May 1954 (aged 22)	(Kuwait Football Association) Kuwait SC
18	MF	Saleh Al-Asfoor		(Kuwait Football Association) Al Salmiya
15	MF	Saud Bouhamad		(Kuwait Football Association) Al Qadisiya
7	FW	Fathi Kameel	23 May 1955 (aged 21)	(Kuwait Football Association) Al Tadamun
16	FW	Faisal Al-Dakhil	13 August 1957 (aged 18)	(Kuwait Football Association) Al Qadisiya
12	FW	Mohammed Abdullah		(Kuwait Football Association) Kuwait SC
9	FW	Jasem Yaqoub	25 October 1953 (aged 22)	(Kuwait Football Association) Al Qadisiya
10	FW	Abdulaziz Al-Anberi	3 January 1954 (aged 22)	(Kuwait Football Association) Kuwait SC

=== Malaysia ===
Head coach : (Malaysia) Datuk Maui Kuppan

No.	Pos.	Player	Date of birth (age)	Club
1	GK	Arumugam Rengasamy	31 January 1953 (aged 23)	(Football Association of Malaysia) Selangor FA
20	GK	Hamid Ramli		(Football Association of Malaysia) Kelantan FA
2	DF	Zainuddin Hussein		(Football Association of Malaysia) Negeri Sembilan FA
3	DF	Abdullah Ali	5 November 1954 (aged 21)	(Football Association of Malaysia) Selangor FA
5	DF	Santokh Singh	22 June 1952 (aged 23)	(Football Association of Malaysia) Selangor FA
8	DF	Yahya Jusoh	15 May 1952 (aged 24)	(Football Association of Malaysia) Terengganu FA
14	DF	Radzi Ahmad		(Football Association of Malaysia)
6	MF	Shukor Salleh	4 December 1948 (aged 27)	(Football Association of Malaysia) Penang FA
16	MF	Khor Sek Leng	25 October 1952 (aged 23)	(Football Association of Malaysia) Kedah FA
9	MF	Isa Bakar	25 December 1952 (aged 23)	(Football Association of Malaysia) Penang FA
17	MF	Mohsen Vithilinggam		(Football Association of Malaysia) Kedah FA
7	MF	Ali Bakar	18 November 1947 (aged 28)	(Football Association of Malaysia) Penang FA
4	MF	Parwan Umaparam		(Football Association of Malaysia) Perak FA
10	FW	Mokhtar Dahari (c)	13 November 1953 (aged 22)	(Football Association of Malaysia) Selangor FA
15	FW	Idris Daud		(Football Association of Malaysia) Kelantan FA
19	FW	Irfan Bakti	1 April 1951 (aged 25)	(Football Association of Malaysia) Kelantan FA
13	FW	P. Dharmalingam		(Football Association of Malaysia) Selangor FA

== Group B ==
=== Iran ===
Head coach : (Iran) Heshmat Mohajerani

No.	Pos.	Player	Date of birth (age)	Club
1	GK	Mansour Rashidi	12 November 1947 (aged 28)	(Football Federation Islamic Republic of Iran) Taj
18	GK	Mehdi Asgarkhani	25 March 1948 (aged 28)	(Football Federation Islamic Republic of Iran) Aboomoslem
3	DF	Hassan Nazari	19 August 1956 (aged 19)	(Football Federation Islamic Republic of Iran) Taj
4	DF	Bijan Zolfagharnasab	7 June 1949 (aged 26)	(Football Federation Islamic Republic of Iran) Persepolis
8	DF	Nasrollah Abdollahi	2 September 1951 (aged 24)	(Football Federation Islamic Republic of Iran) Shahbaz
2	DF	Andranik Eskandarian	31 December 1951 (aged 24)	(Football Federation Islamic Republic of Iran) Taj
12	DF	Hassan Nayebagha	17 September 1950 (aged 25)	(Football Federation Islamic Republic of Iran) Homa
15	DF	Sahameddin Mirfakhraei	4 February 1951 (aged 25)	(Football Federation Islamic Republic of Iran) Homa
7	MF	Ali Parvin	20 September 1946 (aged 29)	(Football Federation Islamic Republic of Iran) Persepolis
5	MF	Parviz Ghelichkhani (c)	4 December 1945 (aged 30)	(Football Federation Islamic Republic of Iran) Daraei
6	MF	Ebrahim Ghasempour	11 September 1957 (aged 18)	(Football Federation Islamic Republic of Iran) Sanat Naft
15	MF	Mohammad Sadeghi	16 March 1952 (aged 24)	(Football Federation Islamic Republic of Iran) PAS Tehran
13	MF	Alireza Azizi	12 January 1950 (aged 26)	(Football Federation Islamic Republic of Iran) Persepolis
16	MF	Garnik Shahbandari	1954	(Football Federation Islamic Republic of Iran) Daraei
11	FW	Alireza Khorshidi	1952	(Football Federation Islamic Republic of Iran) Homa
9	FW	Nasser Nouraei	16 June 1954 (aged 21)	(Football Federation Islamic Republic of Iran) Homa
17	FW	Gholam Hossein Mazloomi	13 January 1950 (aged 26)	(Football Federation Islamic Republic of Iran) Shahbaz
10	FW	Hassan Rowshan	24 October 1955 (aged 20)	(Football Federation Islamic Republic of Iran) Taj

=== Iraq ===
Head coach: (Socialist Federal Republic of Yugoslavia) Lenko Grčić (Kaka)

No.	Pos.	Player	Date of birth (age)	Club
1	GK	Jalal Abdul-Rahman	6 May 1946 (aged 30)	(Iraq Football Association) Al-Zawraa
2	DF	Mejbel Fartous (c)	6 July 1950 (aged 25)	(Iraq Football Association) Al-Tayaran
3	DF	Adel Khudhair	1 July 1954 (aged 21)	(Iraq Football Association) Al-Zawraa
4	DF	Ibrahim Ali	1 July 1950 (aged 25)	(Iraq Football Association) Al-Zawraa
5	DF	Kadhim Kamil	1 July 1951 (aged 24)	(Iraq Football Association) Al-Tayaran
6	MF	Hassani Alwan	1 January 1955 (aged 21)	(Iraq Football Association) Al-Zawraa
8	FW	Falah Hassan	1 July 1951 (aged 24)	(Iraq Football Association) Al-Zawraa
10	FW	Ahmed Subhi	1 January 1955 (aged 21)	(Iraq Football Association) Al-Baladiyat
11	FW	Thamer Yousif	1 July 1953 (aged 22)	(Iraq Football Association) Al-Zawraa
12	MF	Douglas Aziz	1 January 1942 (aged 34)	(Iraq Football Association) Al-Shorta
13	DF	Mohammed Tabra	23 December 1950 (aged 25)	(Iraq Football Association) Al-Shorta
14	MF	Sabah Abdul-Jalil	1 July 1951 (aged 24)	(Iraq Football Association) Al-Baladiyat
15	FW	Ali Kadhim	1 January 1949 (aged 27)	(Iraq Football Association) Al-Zawraa
16	FW	Kadhim Waal	1 January 1951 (aged 25)	(Iraq Football Association) Al-Tayaran
17	MF	Fatah Mohammed	9 October 1950 (aged 25)	(Iraq Football Association) Al-Zawraa
18	DF	Ali Hussein Battush	1 January 1950 (aged 26)	(Iraq Football Association) Al-Zawraa
19	MF	Hesham Mustafa	1 July 1952 (aged 23)	(Iraq Football Association) Al-Tayaran
21	GK	Raad Hammoudi	20 April 1953 (aged 23)	(Iraq Football Association) Al-Shorta

=== South Yemen ===
Head coach: (South Yemen) Ali Mohsen Al-Moraisi

No.	Pos.	Player	Date of birth (age)	Club
1	GK	Tarek Ali Raban		(PDR Yemen Football Federation) Al-Mina SC Tawahi
20	GK	Adel Ismail Mohammed		(PDR Yemen Football Federation) Shamsan SC
2	DF	Hussain Jalab		(PDR Yemen Football Federation) Al-Tilal SC
5	DF	Aziz Abdulrahman		(PDR Yemen Football Federation) Al-Tilal SC
4	DF	Abdullah Salah al-Hirar		(PDR Yemen Football Federation) Al-Wehda
6	DF	Osman Khaleb		(PDR Yemen Football Federation) Al-Wehda
14	DF	Hussain Amar		(PDR Yemen Football Federation) Al-Tilal SC
3	DF	Osam Abdah Omar		(PDR Yemen Football Federation) Shamsan SC
13	MF	Mohammed Sharaf Ahmed (c)		(PDR Yemen Football Federation) Al-Tilal SC
16	MF	Awaz Salem Awaz Awazeen		(PDR Yemen Football Federation) Al-Tilal SC
8	MF	Abdullah Ba-Aamer	21 October 1954 (aged 21)	(PDR Yemen Football Federation) Al-Wehda
17	MF	Abdulredha Ibrahim		(PDR Yemen Football Federation)
7	MF	Monir Medhesh		(PDR Yemen Football Federation) Al-Wehda
9	MF	Nasser Hadi		(PDR Yemen Football Federation) Al-Wehda
11	FW	Jamil Sayf		(PDR Yemen Football Federation) Shamsan SC
10	FW	Abubakar Al-Mass	1 July 1955 (aged 20)	(PDR Yemen Football Federation) Al-Tilal SC
15	FW	Aziz Salem		(PDR Yemen Football Federation) Al-Wehda
19	FW	Mohammed Salah Abdullah		(PDR Yemen Football Federation) Al-Tilal SC
