= Iran national football team results (1960–1979) =

This is a list of official football games played by Iran national football team between 1960 and 1979.

== 1962 ==
Friendly

1 June 1962

| Iran | 1–1 | Iraq |
|---|---|---|
| Kouzehkanani 90' | Report | Abbas 47' (pen.) |

Amjadieh Stadium, Tehran
Attendance: 10,000

Friendly

3 June 1962

| Iran | 1–2 | Iraq |
|---|---|---|
| Kouzehkanani | Report | Ismail 47'; Hamid 60' |

Amjadieh Stadium, Tehran
Attendance: 12,000

== 1965 ==
1965 RCD Cup

23 July 1965

| Iran | 4–1 | Pakistan |
|---|---|---|
| Arab 17'; Jabbari 20'; Behzadi 70', 79' | Report | Umer 88' |

Amjadieh Stadium, Tehran
Attendance: 27,000

1965 RCD Cup

25 July 1965

| Iran | 0–0 | Turkey |
|---|---|---|
| | Report |

Amjadieh Stadium, Tehran
Attendance: 30,000
Referee: Masudur Rahman (Pakistan)

== 1966 ==
Friendly

16 March 1966

| Iran | 0–0 | Turkey |
|---|---|---|
| | Report |

Amjadieh Stadium, Tehran
Attendance: 5,000
Referee: Bruno de Marchi (Italy)

1966 Asian Games – Preliminary round

10 December 1966

| Iran | 2–0 | Malaysia |
|---|---|---|
| Shirzadegan 28'; Behzadi 50' | Report |

Chulalongkorn University Stadium, Bangkok
Attendance: 15,000

1966 Asian Games – Preliminary round

11 December 1966
17:00

| Japan | 3–1 | Iran |
|---|---|---|
| Kamamoto 46'; Sugiyama 84'; Ogi 90' (pen.) | Report | Shirzadegan 37' |

Chulalongkorn University Stadium, Bangkok
Attendance: 15,000
Referee: P. Rodpothong (Thailand)

1966 Asian Games – Preliminary round

13 December 1966

| Iran | 4–1 | India |
|---|---|---|
| Esmaeili 20', 85'; Talebi 25'; Jabbari 87' | Report | Singh 12' (pen.) |

Chulalongkorn University Stadium, Bangkok
Attendance: 10,000

1966 Asian Games – Quarterfinal

16 December 1966

| Iran | 1–0 | Indonesia |
|---|---|---|
| Behzadi 27' | Report |

Tarua Stadium, Bangkok
Attendance: 5,000
Referee: Tom Kay (Singapore)

1966 Asian Games – Quarterfinal

17 December 1966

| Burma | 1–0 | Iran |
|---|---|---|
| Tin Aye 27' | Report |

Tarua Stadium, Bangkok
Attendance: 12,000

1966 Asian Games – Semifinal

18 December 1966
18:00

| Iran | 1–0 | Japan |
|---|---|---|
| Esmaeili 33' | Report |

Tarua Stadium, Bangkok
Attendance: 20,000
Referee: N. Chatterjee (India)

1966 Asian Games – Final

20 December 1966

| Burma | 1–0 | Iran |
|---|---|---|
| Tin Aung 67' | Report |

Tarua Stadium, Bangkok
Attendance: 35,000

== 1967 ==
1967 RCD Cup

24 November 1967

| Pakistan | 0–2 | Iran |
|---|---|---|
| | Report | Behzadi 35'; Esmaeili 65' |

Dacca Stadium, Dhaka
Attendance: 5,000

1967 RCD Cup

26 November 1967

| Turkey | 1–0 | Iran |
|---|---|---|
| Güzelırmak 70' | Report |

Dacca Stadium, Dhaka
Attendance: 5,000
Referee: Isa Khan (Pakistan)

== 1968 ==
1968 AFC Asian Cup

10 May 1968
16:00

| Iran | 2–0 | Hong Kong |
|---|---|---|
| Behzadi 70'; Jabbari 89' | Report |

Amjadieh Stadium, Tehran
Attendance: 30,000
Referee: Norman Boswell (Malaysia)

1968 AFC Asian Cup

13 May 1968
18:00

| Iran | 4–0 | Taiwan |
|---|---|---|
| Behzadi 34'; Kalani 35'; Eftekhari 51'; Farzami 57' | Report |

Amjadieh Stadium, Tehran
Attendance: 25,000
Referee: S. K. Bhattacharya (India)

1968 AFC Asian Cup

16 May 1968
18:00

| Iran | 3–1 | Burma |
|---|---|---|
| Kalani 2'; Eftekhari 60'; Behzadi 70' | Report | Hla Htay 50' |

Amjadieh Stadium, Tehran
Attendance: 35,000
Referee: Alex Vaz (India)

1968 AFC Asian Cup

19 May 1968
18:00

| Iran | 2–1 | Israel |
|---|---|---|
| Behzadi 75'; Ghelichkhani 87' | Report | Spiegel 52' |

Amjadieh Stadium, Tehran
Attendance: 38,000
Referee: Alex Vaz (India)

== 1969 ==
1969 Friendship Cup

7 March 1969

| Iran | 2–1 | Iraq |
|---|---|---|
| Ghelichkhani; Eftekhari | Report | Dhiab 16' |

Amjadieh Stadium, Tehran
Attendance: 25,000
Referee: Zahurul Alam (Pakistan)

1969 Friendship Cup

12 March 1969

| Iran | 9–1 | Pakistan |
|---|---|---|
| Jabbari 26', 32', 39'; Vafakhah 30', 34'; Mostafavi 48'; Sharafi 55'; Ghelichkhani 60' (pen.); Zarabi 62' | Report | Dar 61' |

Amjadieh Stadium, Tehran
Attendance: 15,000
Referee: Davoud Heidari (Iran)

1969 RCD Cup

13 September 1969

| Iran | 4–2 | Pakistan |
|---|---|---|
| Kalani 9', 14'; Mazloumi 47', 67' | Report | Dar 75'; Akbar 78' |

19 Mayıs Stadium, Ankara
Attendance: 7,000
Referee: Baqatter (Turkey)

1969 RCD Cup

17 September 1969

| Turkey | 4–0 | Iran |
|---|---|---|
| Konca 12', 29'; Bartu 32'; Kurt 41' | Report |

19 Mayıs Stadium, Ankara
Attendance: 40,000
Referee: Afrar Khan (Pakistan)

== 1970 ==
1970 RCD Cup

1 September 1970

| Iran | 7–0 | Pakistan |
|---|---|---|
| Hajmohammad 13', 90'; Ghelichkhani 33'; Haghverdian 55'; Kalani 57'; Nurunnabi 71' (o.g.); Vafakhah 84' | Report |

Amjadieh Stadium, Tehran
Attendance: 20,000
Referee: Ertuğrul Dilek (Turkey)

1970 Asian Games – Preliminary round

10 December 1970
16:00

| Indonesia | 2–2 | Iran |
|---|---|---|
| Soentoro 71'; Idris 83' | Report | Ashtiani 37'; Sharafi 77' |

Tarua Stadium, Bangkok
Attendance: 10,000
Referee: Masatoshi Nagashima (Japan)

1970 Asian Games – Preliminary round

11 December 1970
20:15

| South Korea | 1–0 | Iran |
|---|---|---|
| Lee Hoe-taik 59' | Report |

Tarua Stadium, Bangkok
Attendance: 20,000
Referee: Nguyễn Quang Toại (Vietnam)

== 1971 ==
Friendly

10 September 1971
19:30

| South Korea | 2–0 | Iran |
|---|---|---|
| Chung Kyu-poong 8'; Park Lee-chun 12' | Report |

Municipal Stadium, Seoul
Attendance: 35,000

Friendly

12 September 1971
19:30

| South Korea | 0–2 | Iran |
|---|---|---|
| | Report | Khorshidi 35'; Kim Ho-in 40' (o.g.) |

Municipal Stadium, Seoul
Attendance: 35,000

== 1972 ==
1972 AFC Asian Cup – Group allocation matches

7 May 1972

| Iran | 2–0 | Khmer Republic |
|---|---|---|
| Kalani 45'; Iranpak 51' | Report |

National Stadium, Bangkok
Attendance: 2,000
Referee: Kim Jo-wong (South Korea)

1972 AFC Asian Cup – Preliminary round

9 May 1972

| Iran | 3–0 | Iraq |
|---|---|---|
| Kalani 34', 70', 78' | Report |

National Stadium, Bangkok
Attendance: 5,000
Referee: Sivapalan Kathiravale (Malaysia)

1972 AFC Asian Cup – Preliminary round

13 May 1972

| Thailand | 2–3 | Iran |
|---|---|---|
| Tantariyanond 69', 70' | Report | Jabbari 80', 86', 88' |

National Stadium, Bangkok
Attendance: 25,000
Referee: Matolzi (Malaysia)

1972 AFC Asian Cup – Semifinal

16 May 1972

| Iran | 2–1 | Khmer Republic |
|---|---|---|
| Iranpak 13'; Ghelichkhani 47' | Report | Doeur Sokhom 18' |

National Stadium, Bangkok
Attendance: 20,000
Referee: Matolzi (Malaysia)

1972 AFC Asian Cup – Final

19 May 1972

| Iran | 2–1 (a.e.t.) | South Korea |
|---|---|---|
| Jabbari 48'; Kalani 108' | Report | Park Lee-chun 65' |

National Stadium, Bangkok
Attendance: 15,000
Referee: Sivapalan Kathiravale (Malaysia)

1972 Brazil Independence Cup – Preliminary round

11 June 1972

| Republic of Ireland | 2–1 | Iran |
|---|---|---|
| Leech 57'; Givens 74' | Report | Ghelichkhani 10' |

Estádio do Arruda, Recife
Attendance: 10,500
Referee: Aurelio Angonese (Italy)

1972 Brazil Independence Cup – Preliminary round

14 June 1972

| Portugal | 3–0 | Iran |
|---|---|---|
| Eusébio 13'; Dinis 31'; Coelho 72' | Report |

Estádio do Arruda, Recife
Attendance: 12,000
Referee: Guillermo Velasquez (Colombia)

1972 Brazil Independence Cup – Preliminary round

21 June 1972

| Ecuador | 1–1 | Iran |
|---|---|---|
| Lasso 15' | Report | Ghelichkhani 36' |

Estádio do Arruda, Recife
Attendance: 5,000
Referee: Sebastião Rufino (Brazil)

1972 Brazil Independence Cup – Preliminary round

25 June 1972

| Chile | 2–1 | Iran |
|---|---|---|
| Caszely 50', 79' | Report | Halvaei 85' |

Estádio do Arruda, Recife
Attendance: 15,000
Referee: Aurelio Angonese (Italy)

== 1973 ==
1974 FIFA World Cup qualifier – First round

4 May 1973

| Iran | 0–0 | North Korea |
|---|---|---|
| | Report |

Aryamehr Stadium, Tehran
Attendance: 63,000
Referee: M. Ramalingam (Malaysia)

1974 FIFA World Cup qualifier – First round

6 May 1973

| Kuwait | 1–2 | Iran |
|---|---|---|
| Kameel 83' | Report | Vafakhah 20'; Parvin 56' |

Amjadieh Stadium, Tehran
Attendance: 25,000
Referee: Er Wee Kiam (Malaysia)

1974 FIFA World Cup qualifier – First round

8 May 1973

| Syria | 0–1 | Iran |
|---|---|---|
| | Report | Kargarjam 83' |

Amjadieh Stadium, Tehran
Attendance: 25,000
Referee: Manit Sridaranop (Thailand)

1974 FIFA World Cup qualifier – First round

11 May 1973

| Iran | 2–1 | North Korea |
|---|---|---|
| Monajati 19'; Sadeghi 89' | Report | Pak Sung-jin 48' |

Amjadieh Stadium, Tehran
Attendance: 30,000
Referee: Ong Eng Young (Singapore)

1974 FIFA World Cup qualifier – First round

13 May 1973

| Iran | 2–0 | Kuwait |
|---|---|---|
| Ghelichkhani 60' (pen.); Jabbari 75' | Report |

Amjadieh Stadium, Tehran
Attendance: 20,000
Referee: Manit Sridaranop (Thailand)

1974 FIFA World Cup qualifier – First round

15 May 1973

| Iran | 0–1 | Syria |
|---|---|---|
| | Report | Tatish 11' |

Amjadieh Stadium, Tehran
Attendance: 15,000
Referee: Sirkis Demergian (Lebanon)

Friendly

12 August 1973

| New Zealand | 0–0 | Iran |
|---|---|---|
| | Report |

Newmarket Park, Auckland
Attendance: 8,000
Referee: Tom Delahunty (New Zealand)

1974 FIFA World Cup qualifier – Second round

18 August 1973

| Australia | 3–0 | Iran |
|---|---|---|
| Alston 43'; Abonyi 46'; Wilson 85' | Report |

Sports Ground, Sydney
Attendance: 30,881
Referee: Rudolf Scheurer (Switzerland)

1974 FIFA World Cup qualifier – Second round

24 August 1973

| Iran | 2–0 | Australia |
|---|---|---|
| Ghelichkhani 14' (pen.), 31' | Report |

Aryamehr Stadium, Tehran
Attendance: 80,000
Referee: Pavel Kasakov (Soviet Union)

== 1974 ==
1974 Asian Games – Preliminary round

3 September 1974
18:30

| Iran | 7–0 | Pakistan |
|---|---|---|
| Mazloumi 4', 44', 68'; Jabbari 11'; Parvin 28', 55'; Ghelichkhani 80' | Report |

Amjadieh Stadium, Tehran
Attendance: 20,000
Referee: Wisit (Thailand)

1974 Asian Games – Preliminary round

5 September 1974
18:30

| Iran | 2–1 | Burma |
|---|---|---|
| Sadeghi 7'; Janmaleki 57' | Report | Mia Kiang 37' |

Aryamehr Stadium, Tehran
Attendance: 65,000
Referee: Yoshiyuki Maruyama (Japan)

1974 Asian Games – Preliminary round

7 September 1974
18:00

| Iran | 6–0 | Bahrain |
|---|---|---|
| Jahani 25'; Al-Durazi 28' (o.g.); Ghelichkhani 32'; Etemadi 41'; Dastjerdi 46'; Haghverdian 73' | Report |

Amjadieh Stadium, Tehran
Attendance: 10,000
Referee: Mohammed Azam (India)

1974 Asian Games – Semifinal

9 September 1974
16:30

| Iran | 1–0 | Malaysia |
|---|---|---|
| Parvin 17' | Report |

Amjadieh Stadium, Tehran
Attendance: 30,000
Referee: Mohammed Azam (India)

1974 Asian Games – Semifinal

11 September 1974
18:30

| Iran | 2–0 | South Korea |
|---|---|---|
| Mazloumi 74', 90' | Report |

Aryamehr Stadium, Tehran
Attendance: 50,000
Referee: Ibrahim Youssef Al-Doy (Bahrain)

1974 Asian Games – Semifinal

13 September 1974
18:30

| Iran | 1–0 | Iraq |
|---|---|---|
| Roshan | Report |

Aryamehr Stadium, Tehran
Attendance: 85,000

1974 Asian Games – Final

15 September 1974
19:30

| Iran | 1–0 | Israel |
|---|---|---|
| Shum 30' (o.g.) | Report |

Aryamehr Stadium, Tehran
Attendance: 100,000
Referee: Mohammed Azam (India)

Friendly

20 December 1974

| Iran | 0–1 | Czechoslovakia |
|---|---|---|
| | Report | Ondruš 62' (pen.) |

Aryamehr Stadium, Tehran
Attendance: 12,000
Referee: Jafar Namdar (Iran)

== 1975 ==
Friendly

10 August 1975

| Iran | 1–2 | Hungary |
|---|---|---|
| Mazloumi 44' | Report | Várady 28'; Nagy 53' |

Aryamehr Stadium, Tehran
Attendance: 38,000
Referee: Abbas Moghaddaszadeh (Iran)

== 1976 ==
1976 AFC Asian Cup – Preliminary round

4 June 1976

| Iran | 2–0 | Iraq |
|---|---|---|
| Nouraei 45'; Roshan 58' | Report |

Aryamehr Stadium, Tehran
Attendance: 50,000
Referee: Marijan Raus (Yugoslavia)

1976 AFC Asian Cup – Preliminary round

8 June 1976

| Iran | 8–0 | South Yemen |
|---|---|---|
| Azizi 17', 73'; Nouraei 40', 42'; Khorshidi 45'; Mazloumi 63', 74', 80' | Report |

Aryamehr Stadium, Tehran
Attendance: 10,000
Referee: Akram Ul Haq (India)

1976 AFC Asian Cup – Semifinal

11 June 1976

| Iran | 2–0 (a.e.t.) | China |
|---|---|---|
| Khorshidi 100'; Roshan 119' | Report |

Aryamehr Stadium, Tehran
Attendance: 60,000
Referee: Asami (Japan)

1976 AFC Asian Cup – Final

13 June 1976

| Iran | 1–0 | Kuwait |
|---|---|---|
| Parvin 71' | Report |

Aryamehr Stadium, Tehran
Attendance: 100,000
Referee: Jean Dubach (Switzerland)

Friendly

2 July 1976

| Iran | 2–2 | Romania |
|---|---|---|
| Ghelichkhani 40'; Nouraei 65' | Report | Bölöni 3'; Sandu 82' |

Aryamehr Stadium, Tehran
Attendance: 80,000
Referee: Jafar Namdar (Iran)

== 1977 ==
1978 FIFA World Cup qualifier – First round

7 January 1977

| Saudi Arabia | 0–3 | Iran |
|---|---|---|
| | Report | Mazloumi 16', 78'; Roshan 62' |

Al-Malaz Stadium, Riyadh
Attendance: 30,000
Referee: Erich Linemayr (Austria)

1978 FIFA World Cup qualifier – First round

28 January 1977

| Syria | 0–1 | Iran |
|---|---|---|
| | Report | Parvin 30' |

Abbasiyyin Stadium, Damascus
Attendance: 22,000
Referee: Robert Fratz (France)

Friendly

15 March 1977

| Iran | 0–2 | Hungary |
|---|---|---|
| | Report | Fazekas 27' (pen.); Nyilasi 81' |

Amjadieh Stadium, Tehran
Attendance: 25,000
Referee: Mohsen Zamani (Iran)

75th Anniversary of Real Madrid – Semifinal

22 March 1977

| Iran | 1–1 | Argentina |
|---|---|---|
| Sadeghi 79' | Report | Bertoni 14' (pen.) |
Penalties
| Parvin (penalty scored); Nazari (penalty missed); Adelkhani (penalty missed) | 1–4 | (penalty scored) Benítez; (penalty scored) Olguín; (penalty scored) Ardiles; (penalty scored) Bertoni |

Santiago Bernabéu Stadium, Madrid
Attendance: 35,000
Referee: Franco Martínez (Spain)

1978 FIFA World Cup qualifier – First round

6 April 1977

| Iran | 2–0 Awarded | Syria |

Tajgozari Stadium, Shiraz

* Syria didn't show up.

1978 FIFA World Cup qualifier – First round

22 April 1977

| Iran | 2–0 | Saudi Arabia |
|---|---|---|
| Yousefi 10'; Sharifi 84' | Report |

Tajgozari Stadium, Shiraz
Attendance: 20,000
Referee: Ernst Dörflinger (Switzerland)

1978 FIFA World Cup qualifier – Final round

19 June 1977

| Hong Kong | 0–2 | Iran |
|---|---|---|
| | Report | Kazerani 22'; Jahani 77' |

Government Stadium, Hong Kong
Attendance: 28,000
Referee: Cesare Gussoni (Italy)

1978 FIFA World Cup qualifier – Final round

3 July 1977

| South Korea | 0–0 | Iran |
|---|---|---|
| | Report |

Gudeok Stadium, Busan
Attendance: 30,000
Referee: Fute (Scotland)

Friendly

5 August 1977

| Iran | 0–0 | Romania |
|---|---|---|
| | Report |

Aryamehr Stadium, Tehran
Attendance: 60,000
Referee: Jafar Namdar (Iran)

1978 FIFA World Cup qualifier – Final round

14 August 1977

| Australia | 0–1 | Iran |
|---|---|---|
| | Report | Roshan 68' |

Olympic Park Stadium, Melbourne
Attendance: 17,000
Referee: Franz Wöhrer (Austria)

1978 FIFA World Cup qualifier – Final round

28 October 1977

| Iran | 1–0 | Kuwait |
|---|---|---|
| Jahani 48' | Report |

Aryamehr Stadium, Tehran
Attendance: 100,000
Referee: Clive Thomas (Wales)

1978 FIFA World Cup qualifier – Final round

11 November 1977

| Iran | 2–2 | South Korea |
|---|---|---|
| Roshan 55', 57' | Report | Lee Yung-moo 28', 88' |

Aryamehr Stadium, Tehran
Attendance: 80,000
Referee: Pat Partridge (England)

1978 FIFA World Cup qualifier – Final round

18 November 1977

| Iran | 3–0 | Hong Kong |
|---|---|---|
| Jahani 3', 35'; Kazerani 19' | Report |

Aryamehr Stadium, Tehran
Attendance: 50,000
Referee: Marijan Raus (Yugoslavia)

1978 FIFA World Cup qualifier – Final round

25 November 1977

| Iran | 1–0 | Australia |
|---|---|---|
| Jahani 44' | Report |

Aryamehr Stadium, Tehran
Attendance: 100,000
Referee: Michel Kitabdjian (France)

1978 FIFA World Cup qualifier – Final round

2 December 1977

| Kuwait | 1–2 | Iran |
|---|---|---|
| Al-Dakhil 14' | Report | Fariba 48'; Khabiri 59' |

Al-Kuwait Sports Club Stadium, Kuwait City
Attendance: 22,000
Referee: Malcolm Wright (Northern Ireland)

== 1978 ==
Friendly

5 April 1978

| Iran | 0–0 | Yugoslavia |
|---|---|---|
| | Report |

Aryamehr Stadium, Tehran
Attendance: 30,000
Referee: Jafar Namdar (Iran)

Friendly

18 April 1978

| Iran | 0–1 | Wales |
|---|---|---|
| | Report | Dwyer 71' |

Aryamehr Stadium, Tehran
Attendance: 60,000
Referee: Abbas Moghaddaszadeh (Iran)

Friendly

26 April 1978

| Iran | 1–1 | Bulgaria |
|---|---|---|
| Parvin 50' (pen.) | Report | Sokolov 38' |

Aryamehr Stadium, Tehran
Attendance: 65,000
Referee: Jafar Namdar (Iran)

Friendly

11 May 1978

| France | 2–1 | Iran |
|---|---|---|
| Gemmrich 14'; Six 70' | Report | Roshan 47' |

Stadium Municipal, Toulouse
Attendance: 35,000
Referee: Augusto Lamo (Spain)

1978 Afro-Asian Cup of Nations

19 May 1978

| Iran | 3–0 | Ghana |
|---|---|---|
| Khani 20'; Khalilian 70'; Mazloumi 75' | Report |

Aryamehr Stadium, Tehran
Attendance: 8,000
Referee: Abdulwahab Al-Bannai (Kuwait)

1978 FIFA World Cup – Preliminary round

3 June 1978
16:45

| Netherlands | 3–0 | Iran |
|---|---|---|
| Rensenbrink 40' (pen.), 62', 78' (pen.) | Report |

Estadio Ciudad de Mendoza, Mendoza
Attendance: 33,431
Referee: Alfonso González (Mexico)

1978 FIFA World Cup – Preliminary round

7 June 1978
16:45

| Scotland | 1–1 | Iran |
|---|---|---|
| Eskandarian 43' (o.g.) | Report | Danaeifard 60' |

Estadio Chateau Carreras, Córdoba
Attendance: 7,938
Referee: Youssou N'Diaye (Senegal)

1978 FIFA World Cup – Preliminary round

11 June 1978
16:45

| Peru | 4–1 | Iran |
|---|---|---|
| Velásquez 2'; Cubillas 36' (pen.), 39' (pen.), 79' | Report | Roshan 41' |

Estadio Chateau Carreras, Córdoba
Attendance: 21,262
Referee: Alojzy Jarguz (Poland)

Friendly

6 September 1978

| Iran | 0–1 | Soviet Union |
|---|---|---|
| | Report | Khidiyatullin 17' |

Aryamehr Stadium, Tehran
Attendance: 40,000
Referee: Heinz Aldinger (West Germany)

== Statistics ==
=== Results by year ===
| Year | Pld | W | D | L | GF | GA | GD |
|---|---|---|---|---|---|---|---|
| 1962 | 2 | 0 | 1 | 1 | 2 | 3 | –1 |
| 1965 | 2 | 1 | 1 | 0 | 4 | 1 | +3 |
| 1966 | 8 | 4 | 1 | 3 | 9 | 6 | +3 |
| 1967 | 2 | 1 | 0 | 1 | 2 | 1 | +1 |
| 1968 | 4 | 4 | 0 | 0 | 11 | 2 | +9 |
| 1969 | 4 | 3 | 0 | 1 | 15 | 8 | +7 |
| 1970 | 3 | 1 | 1 | 1 | 9 | 3 | +6 |
| 1971 | 2 | 1 | 0 | 1 | 2 | 2 | 0 |
| 1972 | 9 | 5 | 1 | 3 | 15 | 12 | +3 |
| 1973 | 9 | 5 | 2 | 2 | 9 | 6 | +3 |
| 1974 | 8 | 7 | 0 | 1 | 20 | 2 | +18 |
| 1975 | 1 | 0 | 0 | 1 | 1 | 2 | –1 |
| 1976 | 5 | 4 | 1 | 0 | 15 | 2 | +13 |
| 1977 | 15 | 10 | 4 | 1 | 21 | 6 | +15 |
| 1978 | 9 | 1 | 3 | 5 | 7 | 13 | –6 |
| Total | 83 | 47 | 15 | 21 | 142 | 69 | +73 |

=== Managers ===
| Name | First match | Last match | Pld | W | D | L | GF | GA | GD |
|---|---|---|---|---|---|---|---|---|---|
| (Iran) Hossein Fekri | 1 June 1962 | 16 March 1966 | 5 | 1 | 3 | 1 | 6 | 4 | +2 |
| (Hungary) György Szűcs | 10 December 1966 | 20 December 1966 | 7 | 4 | 0 | 3 | 9 | 6 | +3 |
| (Iran) Hossein Fekri | 24 November 1967 | 26 November 1967 | 2 | 1 | 0 | 1 | 2 | 1 | +1 |
| (Iran) Mahmoud Bayati | 10 May 1968 | 19 May 1968 | 4 | 4 | 0 | 0 | 11 | 2 | +9 |
| (Socialist Federal Republic of Yugoslavia) Zdravko Rajkov | 7 March 1969 | 17 September 1969 | 4 | 3 | 0 | 1 | 15 | 8 | +7 |
| (Iran) Mohammad Bayati | 1 September 1970 | 1 September 1970 | 1 | 1 | 0 | 0 | 7 | 0 | +7 |
| (Soviet Union) Igor Netto | 10 December 1970 | 11 December 1970 | 3 | 0 | 1 | 1 | 2 | 3 | –1 |
| (Iran) Parviz Dehdari | 10 September 1971 | 12 September 1971 | 2 | 1 | 0 | 1 | 2 | 2 | 0 |
| (Iran) Mohammad Ranjbar | 7 May 1972 | 25 June 1972 | 9 | 5 | 1 | 3 | 15 | 12 | +3 |
| (Iran) Mahmoud Bayati | 4 May 1973 | 24 August 1973 | 9 | 5 | 2 | 2 | 9 | 6 | +3 |
| (Republic of Ireland) Frank O'Farrell | 3 September 1974 | 10 August 1975 | 9 | 7 | 0 | 2 | 21 | 4 | +17 |
| (Iran) Heshmat Mohajerani | 3 June 1976 | 6 September 1978 | 29 | 15 | 8 | 6 | 43 | 21 | +22 |
| Total | | | 83 | 47 | 15 | 21 | 142 | 69 | +73 |

=== Opponents ===
Iran national football team head-to-head records (1960–1979)
| Team | Pld | W | D | L | GF | GA | GD | Win % | Confederation |
|---|---|---|---|---|---|---|---|---|---|
| Argentina | 1 | 0 | 1 | 0 | 1 | 1 | 0 | 0.00% | CONMEBOL |
| Australia | 4 | 3 | 0 | 1 | 4 | 3 | +1 | 75.00% | OFC |
| Bahrain | 1 | 1 | 0 | 0 | 6 | 0 | +6 | 100.00% | AFC |
| Bulgaria | 1 | 0 | 1 | 0 | 1 | 1 | 0 | 0.00% | UEFA |
| Burma | 4 | 2 | 0 | 2 | 5 | 4 | +1 | 50.00% | AFC |
| Chile | 1 | 0 | 0 | 1 | 1 | 2 | –1 | 0.00% | CONMEBOL |
| China | 1 | 1 | 0 | 0 | 2 | 0 | +2 | 100.00% | AFC |
| Czechoslovakia | 1 | 0 | 0 | 1 | 0 | 1 | –1 | 0.00% | UEFA |
| Ecuador | 1 | 0 | 1 | 0 | 1 | 1 | 0 | 0.00% | CONMEBOL |
| France | 1 | 0 | 0 | 1 | 1 | 2 | –1 | 0.00% | UEFA |
| Ghana | 1 | 1 | 0 | 0 | 3 | 0 | +3 | 100.00% | CAF |
| Hong Kong | 3 | 3 | 0 | 0 | 7 | 0 | +7 | 100.00% | AFC |
| Hungary | 2 | 0 | 0 | 2 | 1 | 4 | –3 | 0.00% | UEFA |
| India | 1 | 1 | 0 | 0 | 4 | 1 | +3 | 100.00% | AFC |
| Indonesia | 2 | 1 | 1 | 0 | 3 | 2 | +1 | 50.00% | AFC |
| Iraq | 6 | 4 | 1 | 1 | 10 | 4 | +6 | 66.67% | AFC |
| Republic of Ireland | 1 | 0 | 0 | 1 | 1 | 2 | –1 | 0.00% | UEFA |
| Israel | 2 | 2 | 0 | 0 | 3 | 1 | +2 | 100.00% | AFC |
| Japan | 2 | 1 | 0 | 1 | 2 | 3 | –1 | 50.00% | AFC |
| Khmer Republic | 2 | 2 | 0 | 0 | 4 | 1 | +3 | 100.00% | AFC |
| North Korea | 2 | 1 | 1 | 0 | 2 | 1 | +1 | 50.00% | AFC |
| South Korea | 7 | 3 | 2 | 2 | 8 | 6 | +2 | 42.86% | AFC |
| Kuwait | 5 | 5 | 0 | 0 | 9 | 2 | +7 | 100.00% | AFC |
| Malaysia | 2 | 2 | 0 | 0 | 3 | 0 | +3 | 100.00% | AFC |
| Netherlands | 1 | 0 | 0 | 1 | 0 | 3 | –3 | 0.00% | UEFA |
| New Zealand | 1 | 0 | 1 | 0 | 0 | 0 | 0 | 0.00% | OFC |
| Pakistan | 6 | 6 | 0 | 0 | 33 | 4 | +29 | 100.00% | AFC |
| Peru | 1 | 0 | 0 | 1 | 1 | 4 | –3 | 0.00% | CONMEBOL |
| Portugal | 1 | 0 | 0 | 1 | 0 | 3 | –3 | 0.00% | UEFA |
| Romania | 2 | 0 | 2 | 0 | 2 | 2 | 0 | 0.00% | UEFA |
| Saudi Arabia | 2 | 2 | 0 | 0 | 5 | 0 | +5 | 100.00% | AFC |
| Scotland | 1 | 0 | 1 | 0 | 1 | 1 | 0 | 0.00% | UEFA |
| South Yemen | 1 | 1 | 0 | 0 | 8 | 0 | +8 | 100.00% | AFC |
| Taiwan | 1 | 1 | 0 | 0 | 4 | 0 | +4 | 100.00% | AFC |
| Soviet Union | 1 | 0 | 0 | 1 | 0 | 1 | –1 | 0.00% | UEFA |
| Syria | 4 | 3 | 0 | 1 | 4 | 1 | +3 | 75.00% | AFC |
| Thailand | 1 | 1 | 0 | 0 | 3 | 2 | +1 | 100.00% | AFC |
| Turkey | 4 | 0 | 2 | 2 | 0 | 5 | –5 | 0.00% | UEFA |
| Wales | 1 | 0 | 0 | 1 | 0 | 1 | –1 | 0.00% | UEFA |
| Yugoslavia | 1 | 0 | 1 | 0 | 0 | 0 | 0 | 0.00% | UEFA |
| Total | 83 | 47 | 15 | 21 | 143 | 69 | +74 | 56.63% | |
