= Zhang Qun (footballer) =

Chinese footballer (born 1950)

Zhang Qun 张群
Personal information
- Full name: Zhang Qun
- Date of birth: June 25, 1950 (age 76)
- Place of birth: Dalian, Liaoning, China
- Position: Midfielder

Youth career
- 1961–1964: Dalian Amateur Sports School

Senior career*
Years	Team	Apps	(Gls)
1965–1972	Liaoning		
1973–1980	Bayi		

International career
1976	China		

Managerial career
- 1988: Dalian
- 2025: Shanghai women's U-18
Medal record
Men's football
Representing China
AFC Asian Cup
Bronze medal – third place	1976 Iran	Team
- * Club domestic league appearances and goals

Zhang Qun
- Simplified Chinese: 张群
- Traditional Chinese: 張群
Transcriptions
Standard Mandarin
- Hanyu Pinyin: Zhāng qún
- Wade–Giles: Zhāng^{1}qún^{1}

Zhang Qun (Chinese: 张群; pinyin: Zhāng qún; born June 25, 1950) is a retired Chinese football player and manager. He played for Liaoning and Bayi as a midfielder throughout the 1960s and the 1970s. He also represented China internationally for the 1976 AFC Asian Cup.

== Club career ==
Zhang attended the Dalian Amateur Sports School beginning in 1961. His talents earned him attention from Liaoning which would see him promoted to the senior roster in 1965. He was then transferred to play for Bayi for the 1973 National Football League. He would find great success in the following 1974 National Football League where the club would win the tournament that season. His final notable moment with the club came through his participation in the 1977 Beijing International Football Friendship Invitational Tournament where the club would make the knockout stages but lost in the semi-finals to North Korean club Daedonggang. He remained with the club for the remainder of his career, retiring in 1980.

== International career ==
Zhang was called up to represent China for the 1976 AFC Asian Cup as a backup player with the team later going on to achieve third place in their AFC Asian Cup debut. He was one of six players from Liaoning to represent the squad alongside Chi Shangbin, Qi Wusheng, Wang Jilian, Yu Jinglian and Zhang Yiming.

== Coaching career ==
Zhang was first the manager for the youth sector of Dalian for the 1st First National Urban Games held in 1988 alongside Gai Zengjun and Yang Xianmin as the team later went on to win the tournament after beating Guangzhou 1–0 in the final held on 1 November. He later coached the Shanghai women's U-18 team for the 2025 National Games of China where the team went on to achieve fourth place in the tournament.
