= Hassan Nayebagha =

Iranian footballer

Hassan Nayebagha حسن نایب‌آقا
Personal information
- Full name: Hassan Nayebagha
- Date of birth: 17 September 1950 (age 76)
- Place of birth: Tehran, Iran
- Position: Defender

Senior career*
Years	Team	Apps	(Gls)
?–1978	Homa F.C.		

International career
1974–1978	Iran	20	(0)
- * Club domestic league appearances and goals

Hassan Nayebagha (Persian: حسن نایب‌آقا) is a retired Iranian football player.

== Club career ==
He played for Homa F.C. In 1975, he reached the third place in the Iranian league, 1976 he reached the second place with Homa in the Iranian league along with national team colleagues like Nasser Nouraei, Sahameddin Mirfakhraei, Alireza Khorshidi and Alireza Azizi.

== International career ==
Nayebagha was a member of the Iranian team winning the Asia Cup 1976 in Tehran and reaching the quarterfinals of the Olympic Tournament in Montreal in 1976.

He also played for the Iran national football team and played in two of the matches at the 1978 FIFA World Cup, played the full 90mins against Netherlands and came on as a substitute in the game against Scotland.

== After career ==
Nayebagha joined after the Iranian Revolution together with Bahram Mavaddat the People's Mujahedin of Iran, today he is one of the leaders if this anti-IRI movement.
