= South Yemen at the AFC Asian Cup =

National football delegation

South Yemen national football team had only participated in one AFC Asian Cup, during 1976 edition. It was South Yemen's only participation in their history, until Yemeni unification at 1990. After 1990, South and North Yemen were together reunited, but South Yemen was not recognized as predecessor of modern Yemen team.

== 1976 Asian Cup ==
=== Group B ===
Team	Pld	W	D	L	GF	GA	GD	Pts
Iran	2	2	0	0	10	0	+10	4
Iraq	2	1	0	1	1	2	−1	2
South Yemen	2	0	0	2	0	9	−9	0

6 June 1976

Iraq	1–0	South Yemen
Waal 84'

Aryamehr Stadium, Tehran

8 June 1976

Iran	8–0	South Yemen
Azizi 17', 73'; Nouraei 40', 42'; Khorshidi 45'; Mazloumi 63', 74', 80'

Aryamehr Stadium, Tehran
Attendance: 10,000
Referee: Akram Ul Haq (India)
