= Football at the 1976 Summer Olympics – Men's Asian Qualifiers =

1976 Summer Olympics – Men's Football Asian Qualifiers
- Dates: 20 August 1975 – 28 April 1976

This page provides the summaries of the matches of the qualifying tournaments divided into three groups, two of five teams and one of six teams. The winners of each group qualified for the 1976 Summer Olympics tournament held in Montreal. Three teams qualified – Iran, North Korea and Israel.

== Qualifying tournaments ==
=== Group 1 ===
Lebanon withdrew a week before the start of the group stage. The qualifying tournament of group 1 was held in Tehran by order of Mohammad Reza Shah.

Team	Pld	W	D	L	GF	GA	GD	Pts
Iran	4	3	1	0	8	1	+7	7
Kuwait	4	2	1	1	8	6	+2	5
Iraq	4	2	0	2	6	4	+2	4
Saudi Arabia	4	2	0	2	5	7	−2	4
Bahrain	4	0	0	4	1	10	−9	0

20 August 1975

Iran	3–0	Bahrain
Mazloumi 15', 75'; Parvin 28'

Amjadieh Stadium, Tehran
Attendance: 20,000
Referee: Dahilon (Singapore)

20 August 1975

Kuwait	1–2	Iraq
Yaqoub 75'		Kadhim 29', 58'

Amjadieh Stadium, Tehran
Attendance: 12,000

22 August 1975

Iran	1–1	Kuwait
Rowshan 7'		Mohammed 82'

Aryamehr Stadium, Tehran
Attendance: 40,000
Referee: Paul Schiller (Austria)

22 August 1975

Iraq	0–2	Saudi Arabia
		Abdulshakoor 17'; Kayyal 66'

Amjadieh Stadium, Tehran
Attendance: 20,000

24 August 1975

Iran	3–0	Saudi Arabia
Mazloumi 11', 82'; Khorshidi 62'

Amjadieh Stadium, Tehran
Attendance: 25,000
Referee: Milivoje Gugulovic (Yugoslavia)

24 August 1975

Kuwait	2–1	Bahrain
Kameel 29', 63'		Showayer 52'

Amjadieh Stadium, Tehran

26 August 1975

Kuwait	4–2	Saudi Arabia
Al-Mula 3', 87'; Abdullah 12'; Kameel 46'		Abdulshakoor 31'; Sobhi 75'

Amjadieh Stadium, Tehran
Attendance: 5,000

26 August 1975

Iraq	4–0	Bahrain
Kadhim 27', 29', 68', 71'

Amjadieh Stadium, Tehran

28 August 1975

Saudi Arabia	1–0	Bahrain
Al-Humood 83'

Aryamehr Stadium, Tehran
Attendance: 50,000

29 August 1975

Iran	1–0	Iraq
Khorshidi 66'

Aryamehr Stadium, Tehran
Attendance: 80,000
Referee: Sergio Gonella (Italy)

Iran won the group and qualified for the 1976 Summer Olympics football tournament.

=== Group 2 ===
Bangladesh, India and Thailand withdrew ahead of the start of the group stage.

==== Round 1 ====
Australia	w/o	Papua New Guinea

Papua New Guinea	w/o	Australia

Australia withdrew, Papua New Guinea advanced to the second round.

==== Round 2 ====
The qualifying tournament of group 2 was held in Jakarta.

Team	Pld	W	D	L	GF	GA	GD	Pts
North Korea	4	4	0	0	10	1	+9	8
Indonesia	4	2	1	1	11	5	+6	5
Malaysia	4	2	0	2	17	5	+12	4
Singapore	4	1	1	2	7	12	−5	3
Papua New Guinea	4	0	0	4	7	29	−22	0

North Korea	2–1	Indonesia

Jakarta

North Korea	2–0	Malaysia

Jakarta

North Korea	2–0	Singapore

Jakarta

North Korea	4–0	Papua New Guinea

Jakarta

Indonesia	2–1	Malaysia

Jakarta

Indonesia	0–0	Singapore

Jakarta

Indonesia	8–2	Papua New Guinea

Jakarta

Malaysia	6–0	Singapore

Jakarta

Malaysia	10–1	Papua New Guinea

Jakarta

Singapore	7–4	Papua New Guinea

Jakarta

==== Final ====
North Korea	0–0 (a.e.t.)	Indonesia
Penalties
	5–4

Jakarta

North Korea won the group and qualified for the 1976 Summer Olympics football tournament.

=== Group 3 ===
==== Round 1 ====
Japan	3–0	Philippines

Philippines	0–3	Japan

Japan advanced to the second round.

Republic of China	0–2	South Korea

South Korea	3–0	Republic of China

South Korea advanced to the second round.

Israel	w/o	South Vietnam

South Vietnam	w/o	Israel

South Vietnam withdrew, Israel advanced to the second round.

==== Round 2 ====
Team	Pld	W	D	L	GF	GA	GD	Pts
Israel	4	3	1	0	10	2	+8	7
South Korea	4	1	2	1	5	5	0	4
Japan	4	0	1	3	3	11	+8	1

Israel	0–0	South Korea

South Korea	1–3	Israel

Israel	4–1	Japan

Japan	0–3	Israel

South Korea	2–2	Japan

Japan	0–2	South Korea

Israel won the group and qualified for the 1976 Summer Olympics football tournament.
