= Yang Anli =

Chinese footballer (born 1959)

Yang Anli 杨安利
Personal information
- Full name: Yang Anli
- Date of birth: May 7, 1950 (age 76)
- Place of birth: Qingdao, Shandong, China
- Height: 1.80 m (5 ft 11 in)
- Positions: Full-back; central defender

Youth career
- 1964–1967: Qingdao No. 10 Middle School

Senior career*
Years	Team	Apps	(Gls)
1967–1970	Qingdao Paint Factory		
1971–1982	Bayi		

International career
1976–1978	China		

Managerial career
- 1983–2003: Bayi
- 2005–2020: Renmin University
Medal record
Men's football
Representing China
AFC Asian Cup
Bronze medal – third place	1976 Iran	Team
Men's football
Asian Games
Bronze medal – third place	Bangkok 1978	Team
- * Club domestic league appearances and goals

Yang Anli
- Simplified Chinese: 杨安利
- Traditional Chinese: 楊安利
Transcriptions
Standard Mandarin
- Hanyu Pinyin: Yáng ānlì
- Wade–Giles: Yáng^{1} ān^{1}lì^{2}

Yang Anli (Chinese: 杨安利; pinyin: Yáng ānlì; born May 5, 1950) is a retired Chinese footballer. He primarily played for Bayi as a central defender throughout the 1970s, being part of the winning squad for the 1974 National Football League as well as captaining the team around the later half of the decade and into the early 1980s. He also represented China internationally for the 1976 AFC Asian Cup as well as the 1978 Asian Games, winning bronze in both tournaments.

== Club career ==
Yang was born on May 5, 1950 in Qingdao as the third son of Yang Chang who was a footballer throughout the 1940s and currently served as a junior sports school coach. He began his footballing career at the age of 7 as his father was the coach of the Municipal Youth Amateur Sports School. He enrolled in Qingdao No. 10 Middle School in 1964 and under the tutoring of coach Jin Tianmin, who was also a teammate of his father, his skills improved significantly. After graduating from high school in 1968, Yang and his second brother, Yang Ansheng had opted for differing paths as whilst the latter went for the countryside in Liaocheng Linqing, Yang joined the Qingdao Paint Factory where he would later play for their football team. Throughout this era, he was primarily guided by Wu Shengtai who played for Cangkou Bank throughout his career as a player. In 1971, Liu Guojiang, another footballer who emerged from Qingdao, was looking for younger footballers to train within the Beijing Institute of Physical Education which had been undergoing a recovery process the year prior. Two Bayi players, Liu Jinhai and Yang Chenshu would both nominate Yang to participate and despite initial hesitation towards the idea due to Yang's father also being his own tutor, Liu eventually agreed after discovering Yang's talents.

On July 11, 1971, he and another fellow Shandong player Cai Jun boarded a train bounded for Beijing with this notably being the first time Yang would travel far from his parents and home city. Throughout his training period, he, Pei Encai and others would improve exponentially to the point of playing for Bayi full-time for the 1973 National Football League. His role as the club's new central defender would help contribute greatly to the club winning the following 1974 National Football League. During the 1976 National Football League, Yang was promoted to the club's captain and would maintain a leadership role for the remainder of the decade and into the early 1980s with the club winning the 1977 and the 1981 National Football League. Around the end of his career, he met a young Jia Xiuquan as he was made a player-manager by his final season in 1982.

== International career ==
Yang was first called up to represent China for the upcoming 1976 AFC Asian Cup. He formed the central defensive formation with Qi Wusheng within the starting XI as the Chinese Dragons later going on to achieve third place following defeating Iraq 1–0 in the third-place playoffs. He was later called up to represent China once more for the 1978 Asian Games where they again, achieved third place.

== Coaching career ==
Beginning in 1983, he served as a full-time manager of either the first or youth team of Bayi and would continue until the club ceased operations in 2003. Throughout this era, he trained many players that would later go on to also play for the senior and youth sectors of China as well as for the Olympic Games. In 2005, he was invited to serve within the football sector of Renmin University of China to develop campus football there as he would spend the next fifteen years training the club including winning an edition of the Beijing Revitalize China Cup until his retirement from coaching in 2020. Throughout this era, on May 18, 2015, he was hired as a football development consultant for Tsinghua Primary School which resulted in the club improving substantially in results.
