= Hu Zhigang =

Chinese footballer and coach

Hu Zhigang 胡之刚
Personal information
- Full name: Hu Zhigang
- Date of birth: 29 February 1944 (age 82)
- Place of birth: Shanghai, China
- Height: 1.79 m (5 ft 10 1/2 in)
- Position: Goalkeeper

Youth career
- 1959–1964: Shanghai Youth Football team

Senior career*
Years	Team	Apps	(Gls)
1965–1976	Shanghai team		

International career
1975–1976	China	10	(0)

Managerial career
- 1978–1990: China (assistant)
- 1994–1995: Shenzhen FC
- 1996: Shanghai Yuyuan
- 1997: Jiangsu Gige
- 1999: Wuhan Hongtao K
- 2000: Bayi
- 2004: Xi'an Anxinyuan
Medal record
Men's football
Representing China
AFC Asian Cup
Bronze medal – third place	1976 Iran	Team
- * Club domestic league appearances and goals

Hu Zhigang (Chinese: 胡之刚; 29 February 1944) is a Chinese football coach and a former international goalkeeper. As a player he represented Shanghai football team while internationally he played for the China national team in the 1976 AFC Asian Cup.

== Playing career ==
Hu Zhigang was born in Shanghai, he began his football career in 1959, the year Hu Zhigang joined Shanghai Youth Football team. In 1965, Hu Zhigang was selected to the senior Shanghai football team and represented Shanghai win the runners up of 1965 National Games of China. in the same year, Hu Zhigang was called up to China national football team. Hu Zhigang played for China in the 1976 AFC Asian Cup. Hu Zhigang retired in 1976.

== Coaching career ==
After retiring as a player, Hu Zhigang worked as assistant coach of China national football team from 1978 to 1990. From 1994 to 1995, Hu Zhigang worked as coach of Shenzhen F.C.. In 1996, he worked as coach of Shanghai Yuyuan. In 1997, Hu Zhigang worked as coach of Jiangsu Gige. In 1999, Hu Zhigang worked as coach of Wuhan Hongtao K. In 2000, Hu Zhigang worked as coach of Bayi. In 2004, Hu Zhigang worked as coach of Xi'an Anxinyuan, but after they faced two loss and one draw after 2004 China League One began, Hu Zhigang resigned.
