= Garnik =

Garnik is a given name. Notable people with the given name include:

- Garnik Addarian (1925–1986), Syrian-born Lebanese Armenian poet, writer, and politician
- Garnik Asatrian (born 1953), Iranian-born Armenian professor of Kurdish Studies
- Garnik Avalyan (born 1962), Armenian and Russian football player and coach
- Garnik A. Karapetyan (1958–2018), Armenian scientist and mathematician
- Garnik Mehrabian (1937–2022), Iranian-Armenian football player and coach
- Garnik Mnatsakanyan (born 1989), Armenian freestyle wrestler
- Garnik Shahbandari (born 1954), Iranian footballer
