= Xiang Hengqing =

Chinese footballer

Xiang Hengqing 相恒庆
Personal information
- Full name: Xiang Hengqing
- Date of birth: 15 July 1947
- Place of birth: Qingdao, Shandong, China
- Date of death: 29 June 2015 (aged 67)
- Place of death: Beijing, China
- Height: 1.76 m (5 ft 9 1/2 in)
- Position: Defender

Youth career
- 1964–1972: Shandong Youth football team

Senior career*
Years	Team	Apps	(Gls)
1973–1980	Shandong team		

International career
1970–1980	China	23	(0)

Managerial career
- Shandong Youth football team
- Shandong team
- 1997–1998: Shenzhen FC
- 1999–2000: Yunnan Hongta
- 2001–?: Shandong Women
Medal record
Men's football
Representing China
AFC Asian Cup
Bronze medal – third place	1976 Iran	Team
Asian Games
Bronze medal – third place	1978 Bangkok	Football
- * Club domestic league appearances and goals

Xiang Hengqing (Chinese: 相恒庆; 15 July 1947 – 29 June 2015) was a Chinese footballer who played for China PR in the 1976 Asian Cup.

== Playing career ==
Xiang Hengqing began football career in 1964, he has ever represented the Shandong youth football team and Shandong to participate in the Chinese league. Xiang Hengqing played for Shandong which won the championship of 1979 National Games of China. In 1976, Xiang Hengqing played for China PR in the 1976 Asian Cup.

== Management career ==
Xiang Hengqing retired in 1981, he began to work as coach. Xiang Hengqing had ever worked as the coach of Shandong youth football team and Shandong.from 1992 to 1996, Xiang Hengqing worked as the vice chairman of Shandong province football association. From 1997 to 1998, Xiang Hengqing worked as the leader and coach of Shenzhen F.C. From 1999 to 2000, he worked as the coach of Yunnan Hongta F.C. In 2001, Xiang Hengqing worked as the coach of Shandong women's football team and participate in 2005 National Games of China. In 2002, Xiang Hengqing worked as the coach of Shandong women's football team, and the same time he worked as the vice chairman of Shandong province football association.

== Death ==
On June 29, 2015, Xiang Hengqing died of lung cancer in Beijing, age 68.
