= 2006 Guangzhou Pharmaceutical F.C. season =

Guangzhou F.C. 2006
- Manager: Qi Wusheng
- Stadium: Yuexiushan Stadium
- China League One: 3rd
- FA Cup: Round of 16

The 2005 season is the 55th year in Guangzhou Football Club's existence, their 41st season in the China League One and the 15th season in the professional football league.

The club finished 3rd in the league.
