= Li Weimiao =

Chinese football commentator and former player

Li Weimiao 李惟淼
Personal information
- Full name: Li Weimiao
- Date of birth: 31 March 1950 (age 76)
- Place of birth: Shanghai, China
- Height: 1.70 m (5 ft 7 in)
- Position: Forward

Senior career*
Years	Team	Apps	(Gls)
1972–1981	Beijing team		

International career
1974–1976	China U23		
1976	China	1	(0)
Medal record
Men's football
Representing China
AFC Asian Cup
Bronze medal – third place	1976 Iran	Team
- * Club domestic league appearances and goals

Li Weimiao (Chinese: 李惟淼; born 31 March 1950) is a Chinese former footballer and commentator. He played for Beijing team throughout his career as well as representing China in the 1976 Asian Cup.

== Playing career ==
Li Weimiao started his career playing for the Beijing football team in 1972. He representing Beijing win the runner up of football at China 1975 National Games of China. Li was called up to the Chinese national team and played within the 1976 Asian Cup. In 1981, Li retired from football and began to study in Beijing Sports University until 1983 . He began to work as commentator from 1995.

== Honours ==
Beijing

- China national league: 1973
