= Ali Hussein Battush =

Iraqi association football player

Ali Hussein
Personal information
- Full name: Ali Hussein Battush
- Date of birth: 1 January 1950 (age 76)
- Place of birth: Iraq
- Position: Defender

Senior career*
| Years | Team | Apps | (Gls) |
| 1969–1981 | Al Zawraa | | |

International career
| 1973–1976 | Iraq | | |
- * Club domestic league appearances and goals

Ali Hussein (born 1 January 1950) is a former Iraqi football Defender who played for Iraq in the 1976 AFC Asian Cup.

Ali played for the national team between 1973 and 1976.
