= Zhang Yiming (footballer) =

Chinese footballer (born 1948)

Zhang Yiming 张义明
Personal information
- Full name: Zhang Yiming
- Date of birth: March 1948 (age 78)
- Place of birth: Dalian, Liaoning, China
- Position: Forward

Youth career
- 1964–1970: Dalian Sports Training Class

Senior career*
Years	Team	Apps	(Gls)
1971–1976	Liaoning		
1977–1978	Shenyang Army		

International career
1976	China		

Managerial career
- 1980: Shenyang Army
Medal record
Men's football
Representing China
AFC Asian Cup
Bronze medal – third place	1976 Iran	Team
- * Club domestic league appearances and goals

Zhang Yiming
- Simplified Chinese: 张义明
- Traditional Chinese: 張義明
Transcriptions
Standard Mandarin
- Hanyu Pinyin: Zhāng yìmíng
- Wade–Giles: Zhāng^{1} yì^{1}míng^{2}

Zhang Yiming (Chinese: 张义明; pinyin: Zhāng yìmíng; born March 1948) is a retired Chinese football player and manager. He played as a forward for Liaoning and the Shenyang Army throughout the 1970s. He also represented China for the 1976 AFC Asian Cup.

== Club career ==
Zhang began his career within the Dalian Sports Training Class youth football team beginning in 1964 and would continue until 1970 as in the following season, he began playing for his home club of Liaoning. In 1977, he began playing for the Shenyang Army Football Team and was part of the winning squad for the 1977 National Football Championship before retiring the following season. He later returned to the club in 1980 to serve as the manager that season. He later served as manager of the China youth team for a few years.

== International career ==
Zhang was called up to represent China for their AFC Asian Cup debut in 1976. He primarily played as a reserve as the Chinese Dragons went on to achieve third place in the tournament.
