= Nasser Nouraei =

Iranian footballer

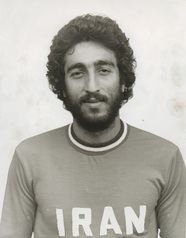

Personal information
- Date of birth: June 16, 1954 (age 72)
- Place of birth: Tehran, Iran
- Position: Forward

Senior career*
Years	Team	Apps	(Gls)
1975–1981	Homa	68	(51)
1981–1984	Persepolis	49	(33)
Total		117	(84)

International career
1975–1980	Iran	10	(5)
- * Club domestic league appearances and goals

Nasser Nouraei (Persian: ناصر نورایی) is a retired Iranian football player.

== Club career ==
He played for Homa F.C. and Persepolis F.C.

With Homa F.C. he reached the third place in the Iranian league in 1975, in 1976 he reached the second place with Homa in the Iranian league alongside national team colleagues like Hassan Nayebagha, Sahameddin Mirfakhraei, Alireza Khorshidi and Alireza Azizi.

After the Iranian Revolution he won with Homa the Iranian nationwide tournament Espandi Cup in 1979.

With Persepolis F.C. he won the Tehran Hazfi Cup in 1982, and reached the second place in 1983.

== International career ==
He played for the Iran national football team and participated at the 1978 FIFA World Cup and 1976 Olympic Games as a member of the squad.

In 1976, he won the Asian Cup in Iran with the Iranian team. Nouraei was one of the first XI in the final match against Kuwait.

== Career statistics ==
=== International goals ===
#	Date	Venue	Opponent	Score	Result	Competition
1.	28 May 1976	Shahbano Farah Stadium, Shiraz, Iran	Brazil U23	2–2	Draw	Friendly
2.	4 June 1976	Aryamehr Stadium, Tehran, Iran	Iraq	2–0	Won	1976 AFC Asian Cup
3.	8 June 1976	Aryamehr Stadium, Tehran, Iran	South Yemen	8–0	Won	1976 AFC Asian Cup
4.	8 June 1976	Aryamehr Stadium, Tehran, Iran	South Yemen	8–0	Won	1976 AFC Asian Cup
5.	2 July 1976	Aryamehr Stadium, Tehran, Iran	Romania	2–2	Draw	Friendly
Correct as of 6 October 2015
