= Kadhim Kamil =

Iraqi association football player

Personal information
- Full name: Kadhim Kamil Mohammed
- Date of birth: 1 July 1951 (age 75)
- Place of birth: Iraq
- Position: Defender

Senior career*
Years	Team	Apps	(Gls)
- Al Bareed
- Al-Quwa Al-Jawiya

International career
1974–1976	Iraq		
- * Club domestic league appearances and goals

Kadhim Kamil (born 1 July 1951) is a former Iraqi football forward who played for Iraq in the 1974 Asian Games and 1976 AFC Asian Cup.

Hesham played for the national team from 1974 to 1976.
