= Fatah Mohammed =

Iraqi association football player

Personal information
- Full name: Fatah Mohammed
- Date of birth: 9 October 1950 (age 76)
- Place of birth: Iraq
- Position: Midfielder

Senior career*
Years	Team	Apps	(Gls)
1969–1982	Al Zawraa		
1982–1984	Al-Jaish SC		
1984–1986	Al-Kuliya Al-Askariya		

International career
1976	Iraq		
- * Club domestic league appearances and goals

Fatah Mohammed (born 9 October 1950) is a former Iraqi football midfielder who played for Iraq in the 1976 AFC Asian Cup.

Fatah played for the national team in 1976.
