= Yu Jinglian =

Chinese footballer

Yu jinglian 于景连
Personal information
- Full name: Yu Jinglian
- Date of birth: 5 March 1953 (age 73)
- Place of birth: Weihai, Shandong, China
- Height: 1.77 m (5 ft 9 1/2 in)
- Position: Forward

Senior career*
Years	Team	Apps	(Gls)
1970–1978	Liaoning team		
1978–1980	Air force football team		
1980–1984	Beijing team		

International career
1976	China	0	(0)

Managerial career
- 2000: Shaanxi Guoli(assistant)
- 2000–2001: Chengdu Wuniu(assistant)
- 2002–2003: Chengdu Wuniu(assistant)
- 2004: Chongqing Lifan(assistant)
- 2005: Chengdu Wuniu(assistant)
- 2008: Wenzhou Tomorrow(assistant)
- 2009: Wenzhou Tomorrow
Medal record
Men's football
Representing China
AFC Asian Cup
Bronze medal – third place	1976 Iran	Team
- * Club domestic league appearances and goals

Yu Jinglian (Chinese: 于景连; 5 March 1953 – ) was a coach and former Chinese footballer. He played for China PR in the 1976 Asian Cup.

== Playing career ==
Yu Jinglian was born in Weihai. He started his career playing for the Liaoning football team in 1970. In 1976, Yu was called up to the Chinese national team and played in the 1976 Asian Cup. He joined air force football team in 1978 and moved to Beijing football team in 1980. Yu retired from football in 1984.

== Coaching career ==
Yu Jinglin joined Shaanxi Guoli to work as an assistant coach in 2000. On 24 December 2000, he left Shaanxi Guoli and joined Chengdu Wuniu as assistant coach. Yu Jinglian left Chengdu Wuniu in 2001 but returned and worked as assistant coach the second time on 6 August until 2003. In 2004, Yu joined Chongqing Lifan to work as assistant coach. From 2008 to 2009, Yu Jinglian went to Wenzhou Tomorrow to work as assistant coach and coach.

== Honours ==
Beijing

- Chinese Jia-A League: 1982, 1984
- President's Gold Cup: 1982
