= Xiang Jun =

Chinese footballer

Personal information
- Full name: Xiang Jun
- Date of birth: October 20, 1983 (age 43)
- Place of birth: Wuhan, Hubei, China
- Height: 1.82 m (6 ft 0 in)
- Position: Defender

Senior career*
Years	Team	Apps	(Gls)
2002–2012	Shenzhen FC	59	(0)
2010	→ Beijing BIT (loan)	8	(0)

Managerial career
- 2023–2024: Shenzhen FC
- * Club domestic league appearances and goals as of 29 March 2012

Xiang Jun (Chinese: 向君; pinyin: Xiàng Jūn; born 20 October 1983, in Wuhan) is a Chinese football former player and manager. He last managed Shenzhen FC until its dissolution in early 2024.

== Club career ==
Xiang Jun started his professional football career playing for Shenzhen's youth team and would eventually graduate to their senior team in the 2002 league season where he made eight league appearances. The following season he would find it difficult to gain any consistent regular playing time within the team and in the 2004 Chinese Super League season he would not feature at all within the title winning team. A fringe player for Shenzhen it wasn't until the 2007 Chinese Super League season that saw Xiang Jun finally make an impact within the team and earn himself the nickname "Da Tou" (Big Head) for his heading ability that saw him help Shenzhen fight off relegation when he was given a run of fourteen league games.

By the 2010 Chinese Super League season Xiang Jun would still be unable to gain a regular starting position within the team and the club's new manager Siniša Gogić would allow him to be loaned out in July to second tier club Beijing BIT. By the 2011 Chinese Super League season Xiang Jun would return to Shenzhen and the club's new manager Philippe Troussier would give him a significantly larger role within the club, however by the end of the season the club were relegated.

== Club career stats ==
Last update: March, 2010

Season	Team	Country	Division	Apps	Goals
2002	Shenzhen Ping'an Insurance	China	1	8	0
2003	Shenzhen Jianlibao	China	1	1	0
2004	Shenzhen Jianlibao	China	1	0	0
2005	Shenzhen Jianlibao	China	1	6	0
2006	Shenzhen Kingway	China	1	2	0
2007	Shenzhen Shangqingyin	China	1	14	0
2008	Shenzhen Shangqingyin	China	1	5	0
2009	Shenzhen Asia Travel F.C.	China	1	8	0
2010	Shenzhen Ruby F.C.	China	1	4	0
2010	Beijing BIT (Loan)	China	2	8	0
2011	Shenzhen Ruby F.C.	China	1	11	0
2012	Shenzhen Ruby F.C.	China	2	2	0
