= Hassan Rowshan =

Iranian footballer

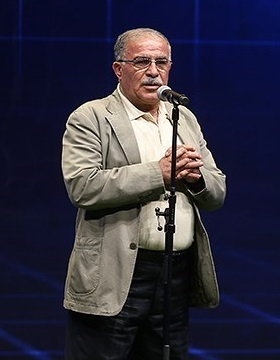

Personal information
- Full name: Hassan Rowshan
- Date of birth: 2 June 1955 (age 71)
- Place of birth: Tehran, Iran
- Height: 1.69 m (5 ft 6 1/2 in)
- Position: Striker

Team information
- Current team: Esteghlal (academy director)

Senior career*
Years	Team	Apps	(Gls)
1971–1978	Taj		
1978–1982	Al Ahli		
1982–1983	Esteghlal		
1983–1984	Al Ahli		
1984–1988	Esteghlal		

International career^{‡}
1974–1980	Iran	39	(13)
- * Club domestic league appearances and goals as of 17 July 2011 ‡ National team caps and goals as of 10 October 2026

Hassan Rowshan (Persian: حسن روشن, born 2 June 1955) is an Iranian football coach, manager, and former player. He usually played as a striker. He is currently the head of technical committee of Esteghlal.

== Early life ==
Rowshan was 13 when he joined Taj youth team. He initially faced many problems, such as his house being far from the Taj training ground in Nazi Abad. His father used to accompany him to the Taj football and training grounds. His father would either wait for Hassan to finish training, carefully watching his moves or given half a chance would join in a senior match when the eldest fancied a game of football. During their long trip back home, Hassan's father would always talk football to him, never tiring from the subject and always willing to advise and offer tips on how to improve his game and skills.

Rowshan's first success came at the school's football championship. While in the sixth grade at Pasargad Shemiran school, he was a member of the school football team. He experienced the sweet taste of championship at that early age, and thought of future championship and grand occasions. Although the championship was sweet at school level, Rowshan did not seriously consider playing this level of football anything other than a pastime and filling the gap.

Hassan Rowshan made his first appearance in a major match during a friendly against a visiting Brazilian youth team at Amjadieh Stadium, attended by an estimated 20,000 spectators. Entered into the match for the final 20 minutes, Rowshan struggled to adapt to playing before a large crowd, and the team was defeated 2-1.

Later, Behzadi recruited Rowshan for Sharq, a team playing in the third division of Tehran league. His contribution to this team was not too successful and the team failed to gain promotion to the second division and subsequently it was disbanded. Since little Rowshan tasted competitive football, he was determined to join a club in the league rather than going back to street football. In 1969 Rowshan joined Taj club (known today as Esteghlal Tehran), one of the two big clubs of Iran.

=== Club success ===
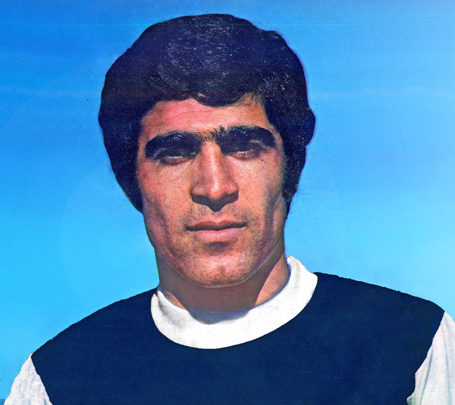
Rowshan with Taj

Rowshan was quickly becoming a household name in Iran. With his club, Taj Tehran, he won many championship and trophies. He first broke into the Taj side when he was 17 years old and played his first season in Takht Jamshid Cup. He won the Iranian league in 1975 and reached the second place in 1974. Further he won the Hazfi Cup in 1977.

After the World Cup 1978, although Hasan Rowshan had limited playing time in Argentina, the scouts from several countries discovered his potential and send representations to his club in order to recruit him. Rowshan settled for UAE and in particular Al-Ahli club of Dubai. Jointly with his national teammate, Hassan Nazari, they won the championship for Al Ahli in 1980. From 1982 to 1983 he joined Esteghlal F.C. again for a few games.

In 1984, Roshan rejoined Esteghlal F.C. again, where he could win the Tehran Province League in 1985.

=== National team success ===
However, the highlights of his career were winning the football tournament of the Asian Games in Tehran in 1974 and Asian Cup 1976 in Tehran as well as reaching the quarterfinals of the Summer Olympics in Montreal in 1976 and winning the qualification for the World Cup finals in Argentina 1978. During the Asian qualification games, Rowshan excelled. His goals and assists was a major contribution to the success of the team and eventual qualification. This success did not come easy, as his constant runs and skills in maneuvering and dribbling made him a target for some rough tackles, he missed some games due to a serious and long lasting knee injury.

His injury after the qualification games were a major problem for coach Heshmat Mohajerani. When Iran played its first game, Rowshan was doubtful. However, he didn't even play one single full game and scored the only goal for Iran in a 4–1 loss to Peru. After the World Cup 1978, many critics in Iran indicated that if Iran had a fully fit Rowshan, the results would have been much better than what was achieved.

== Coaching career ==
He was appointed as the Technical Manager for Iran national under-20 football team in 2005, however he resigned later.

=== Football School ===
When he returned to Iran in the 90s, he formed a top quality football school for kids which was a huge success. Hassan Rowshan Football School was the first academic football school in Middle East.

=== Return to Esteghlal ===
Hassan Rowshan became the head of Esteghlal's Football Academy on 6 August 2007. It's understood that he offered a new Football development system based on Aston Villa's academy, but head of Iran's Sports organization Mr.Ali Abadi & Fatholahzadeh refused to provide the required budget (150K USD per year). Iranian press revealed that Hassan Rowshan tried to fight the powerful insider relationships of the club but he resigned later in 2008. Alireza Mansourian took over the academy. On 15 July 2011, he was appointed as head of technical committee of Esteghlal by Ali Fathollahzadeh succeeding Nasser Hejazi.

== Career statistics ==
=== International goals ===
#	Date	Venue	Opponent	Score	Result	Competition
1.	13 Sep 1974	Aryamehr Stadium, Tehran, Iran	Iraq	1–0	W	1974 Asian Games – Semifinal
2.	22 Aug 1975	Aryamehr Stadium, Tehran, Iran	Kuwait	1–1	D	1976 Summer Olympics Qualifier
3.	4 Jun 1976	Aryamehr Stadium, Tehran, Iran	Iraq	2–0	W	1976 AFC Asian Cup
4.	11 Jun 1976	Aryamehr Stadium, Tehran, Iran	China	2–0	W	1976 AFC Asian Cup
5.	25 Jul 1976	Olympic Stadium, Montreal, Canada	Poland	2–3	L	1976 Olympic Games
6.	7 Jan 1977	Al-Malaz Stadium, Riyadh, Saudi Arabia	Saudi Arabia	3–0	W	1978 FIFA World Cup Qualifier
7.	14 Aug 1977	Olympic Park Stadium, Melbourne, Australia	Australia	1–0	W	1978 FIFA World Cup Qualifier
8.	11 Nov 1977	Aryamehr Stadium, Tehran, Iran	South Korea	2–2	D	1978 FIFA World Cup Qualifier
9.	11 Nov 1977	Aryamehr Stadium, Tehran, Iran	South Korea	2–2	D	1978 FIFA World Cup Qualifier
10.	11 May 1978	Stadium Municipal, Toulouse, France	France	1–2	L	Friendly
11.	11 Jun 1978	Estadio Chateau Carreras, Córdoba, Argentina	Peru	1–4	L	1978 FIFA World Cup
12.	22 Sep 1980	Sabah Al Salem Stadium, Kuwait City, Kuwait	Bangladesh	7–0	W	1980 Asian Cup
Correct as of 24 July 2021

== Legal issues ==
Rowshan was sued for libel and found guilty, with a sentence of a fine and lashes.
