= Shenzhen F.C. =

Chinese professional football club

Shenzhen FC 深圳市足球俱乐部
- Full name: Shenzhen Football Club 深圳市足球俱乐部
- Nicknames: Youth Army; Phoenix; International Arms
- Founded: 26 January 1994; 32 years ago
- Dissolved: 22 January 2024; 2 years ago
- Ground: Shenzhen Universiade Sports Centre
- Capacity: 60,334
- Owner: Kaisa Group
- Head coach: Xiang Jun
- 2023: Chinese Super League, 16th of 16 (relegated)
- Website: shenzhenfc.com.cn
Home colours	Away colours

Shenzhen Football Club (simplified Chinese: 深圳市足球俱乐部; traditional Chinese: 深圳市足球俱樂部) was a Chinese professional football club based in Shenzhen, Guangdong. Shenzhen played its home matches at the Shenzhen Universiade Sports Centre and the Shenzhen Stadium. Their majority shareholder was the Kaisa Group, a property development company which took over the club on 12 April 2016.

The club was founded on 26 January 1994, and was known as Shenzhen F.C. while they started at the bottom of the Chinese football pyramid in the third tier. After successive league title wins in the third and second tier of the professional football leagues, they were promoted to the top tier in the 1996 Chinese Jia-A League season. After only one season they were relegated, however they quickly regained promotion and started to establish themselves within the league before they won the rebranded 2004 Chinese Super League title, making them the first club to win all three divisions within the Chinese league pyramid. Since this achievement the club have struggled to match the same success and after 14 years experienced relegation to the second tier at the end of 2011 Chinese Super League season. The club dissolved after the 2023 season, on 22 January 2024.

== History ==
=== Early club era ===
Shenzhen Football Club was founded on 26 January 1994 by former Chinese players that included Rong Zhixing and Zeng Xuelin after the Chinese Football Association had allowed full professionalism and private ownership throughout their football league system. In an attempt for the City of Shenzhen to gain their first professional football team the club decided that the best way to gain funding was through memberships that included 100 corporate members and 300 individuals before changing the ownership into shareholdings. With Hu Zhigang as their first ever head coach and with players from all over the country, the club won two consecutive promotions and championships before entering the top tier of Chinese football after only two seasons, a remarkable feat named "Shenzhen speed" by the locals.

The club's first foray in the top tier, however was not a success and they were immediately relegated at the end of the 1996 campaign. In January 1997, Ping An Insurance took over the club and renamed it to "Shenzhen Ping'an". With this new ownership the club immediately won back promotion to the top tier after coming runners-up within their division. Once again the team struggled with relegation, however South Korean football legend Cha Bum-Kun was appointed as the club's first ever foreign head coach in the summer of 1998. Cha consolidated the club's status within the top tier with two successful relegation escapes. Meanwhile, the club made a long-term combined signing of 14 hot prospects from Tianjin Locomotive's 1st team as fresh blood, among them included future prospects Li Weifeng and Li Yi.

At the start of the 2000 season on March 27, newly appointed head coach the eccentric Brazilian Edson Tavares caught six players Peng Weiguo, Chen Yongqiang, Zhang Jun, Sun Gang, Wang Chao and Yao Li with prostitutes in the team hotel. This internal incident was leaked to the media becoming an open scandal, however the club claimed inconsistencies with the story, nevertheless the players involved had to make a public apology while the club relieved Tavares of his post as a scapegoat. General manager Zhu Guanghu took over in May and started his regime during, which Shenzhen became a major force within the league and placed fifth in 2001 before coming runners-up in 2002 (though through a joking poker sortition at a formal FA judgment process, in which coach Xie Feng picked card 6 and stated it as 9 and thus won a runner-up back for Shenzhen) their highest finish at the time.

=== Jianlibao Group ===
The Jianlibao Group took over the club before the 2003 campaign and renamed the club after its own brand. The club came fourth within the league and brought in major Chinese signings in Yang Chen who returned to China after spending several seasons in Germany while Zheng Bin answered the summon of Zhu, his coach back in the international youth team. These inclusions as well as the defender Zheng Zhi converted to a playmaker saw Shenzhen Jianlibao sensationally won the first ever Chinese Super League title in 2004 despite severe financial problems leaving players unpaid for seven months. By-then head coach Zhu Guanghu was subsequently awarded the coach of the year award and was appointed head coach of the Chinese national team.

The following season quickly saw the team fall from grace and they only managed a twelfth-place finish (third from bottom) in the league. The new head coach Chi Shangbin resigned after only three mouths due to his poor relationship with the squad, especially from then-captain Li Weifeng and senior players like Li Yi and Yang Chen. Chi was unhappy due to the senior players' influential control over the team, their unprofessional behavior and discipline especially with gambling. He tried to regain control of the squad with his strictness, but most of the players reacted fiercely by training and playing even more poorly. Li Weifeng punched Chi's office window; Yang Chen, who was already a relatively gentle person got upset too and repeatedly exposed the uselessness of Chi's policy to media, which saw the then owner Yang Saixin having to let Chi go. Both of them later infamously and sensationally labeled the troublemakers as "QiuBa"(Football-lord). Throughout the chaos, Shenzhen were still able to reach the 2005 AFC Champions League semi-finals after defeating Saudi Arabian side Al-Ahli despite losing the first leg in Jeddah before they were later heavily defeated by UAE champions Al Ain FC 6–0 in the semi-finals.

The following season the Jianlibao Group lacked interest and cash for investment and were taken over by the Beijing Huizhong Tianheng Investment Company. While the acquisition went through the club survived merely on sponsorship and by selling the best players off. Under domestic head coaches and youngsters from the youth teams founded back in Jianlibao era stepped up in time, and avoided relegations with help from key foreign players in Marek Zając and his compatriot Bogdan Zając. After a heavy defeat at home losing 1–4 to the champion Changchun Yatai at the last match of 2007 season, owner Yang Saixin claimed that he was "fed up" and wanted to sell the club. With no buyers and bids the club went into administration and it was only through their sponsorship deals and the Shenzhen Football Association keeping the club afloat. They experienced more difficulties when their head coach Mai Chao unexpectedly left after one match to join the Guangzhou Football Association and manage their youth team. Long-serving youth coach Zhang Zengqun took over, later joined by former head coach Wang Baoshan as technical consultant. With crucial goals coming from Johnson, nicknamed "Angolan the Great" by fans, who won the silver boot award with 13 goals; and veteran Song Lihui the club survived relegation despite a difficult start to the season.

=== Wan Hongwei ===
On January 21, 2009, Shenzhen F.C. was reportedly bought out of administration by a "Hong Kong based investor" who gained control by acquiring 51% of the club's stock, with the remaining 49% to be transferred in the next six months for a complete takeover alongside former player Fan Yuhong who also brought in his academy at Nanshan, Shenzhen to become the club's youth side while as well as becoming the new managerial director and acting-head coach. On February 28, 2009, Fan Yuhong revealed that the new owners of the club were two main shareholders of China Motion, a publicly listed company in Hong Kong, however these rumors were false. The reality of Shenzhen's finances was that the club's sponsor Shenzhen Asia Travel Sports Culture Communication Co., Ltd were acquiring the majority of the club's shares. Meanwhile, Shenzhen were in talks with a new kit advertisement and naming right sponsor, which would help further stabilize and secure the club's finances while the takeover finished, but only received a miner deal halfway through the season. On November 4, 2009, Wan Wongwei, a representative of a Singapore-based investment company revealed himself as the real investor and chairman of the club. With the Ruby company founded by him and other shareholders to run the club he decided to renamed the club as Shenzhen Ruby FC. Meanwhile, back on the field the team started the season slow and after a heavy 6–1 defeat to Guangzhou F.C. on August 8, Fan was sacked. Former player and coach Xie Feng was appointed as spearhead of the possible return of the legendary Zhu Guanghu, but Zhu turned to wealthier Shaanxi Chanba instead. As Xie Feng tightened the defense, and crucial reinforcements from the transfer market including Hernan Barcos, Mao Jianqing, Marko Zoric and Chen Jie, the team impressively had a 10 match unbeaten run towards the end of season and avoided relegation, despite a controversial 3-point deduction from the FA for wearing the wrong colour kit and in the subsequently delayed match versus Shanghai Shenhua.

Former Cyprus international Siniša Gogić was appointed as head coach for the 2010 season. The attacking and passionate Serbian brought a roller-coaster run combined with an unbeaten start even once reaching the top of the table, however consecutive loses saw them slide towards a relegation fight till the last match of the season. Up to eight foreign players including various internationals Chris Killen, Aleksandar Živković, Vyacheslav Hleb, Ivan Vicelich and Hussein Alaa Hussein all contributed throughout the season and saved the club from relegation for the sixth consecutive season. Off the pitch Ruby Company also announced the three years sponsorship and cooperation deal from Kweichow Moutai Company worth more than 100 million RMB. The club added "Moutai" in its name once again as their named sponsor.

=== Philippe Troussier ===
From a meeting during the 2011 AFC Asian Cup, Wan Hongwei signed former Japanese international head coach Philippe Troussier with a luxurious three-year contract under the financial sponsorship from Moutai Company. Troussier would have a difficult start to his reign when the team had to move from their home ground Shenzhen City Stadium and training ground to Huizhou Olympic Stadium because of the 2011 Summer Universiade. When the team returned to Shenzhen in their new home Bao'an Stadium, Troussier had enforced a youthful revolution within the team, however it turned out to be too radical for the club despite the refreshing ball passing and possessing tactics that they displayed and they suffered from a dreadful club-record six consecutive defeats that also included a cup tie. Despite these defeats he continued to keep faith with the youngsters and "banished" the mature players to the bench or the stand for various reasons. His youngsters collapsed in front of the enormous pressure and unlike in the past campaigns "the relegation escapists" were relegated after 14 years, making them the first professional former top tier champions to be relegated since the foundation of professional football in China.

The club kept faith in Troussier for the 2012 season in the Chinese Jia League and allowed him full influence over the squad, staff structure and pre-season arrangements, control almost unheard of with the current Chinese game. An unpromising start again quickly disappointed fans and caused further upset and conflict left behind from the previous season, which escalated in the fourth round in the league match versus Chongqing F.C. when in a local TV interview Troussier fired out against criticism and doubt from fans and urged them "not to come to the game or him". Shenzhen Ruby won the match, however former players who were forced to leave by Troussier in his efforts to force youth into the team Li Fei and Chris Killen scored for Chongqing F.C. in their first return to Shenzhen and physical confrontations took place after the match among fans, staffs, players and even Troussier himself. His passing tactics lacked penetration on mediocre pitch conditions especially at away grounds and sitting back opposition. This wasn't helped by his off the pitch eccentric personality and temperament, which alienated his relationships with the squad and staff, which was highlighted after a defeat to Chengdu Tiancheng F.C. in an August 25 game saw the club's hopes for promotion vanish with Troussier soon afterwards providing a statement that he would take leave back to France on a "regular holiday under his contract". The club's supporters would believe the board sent him on leave hoping that the indignity would see him resign rather than compensating him the 1 Million euros per year in his contract, however he returned from his holiday despite having two of his close staff members leave and assistant manager Patrick Aussems take charge as caretaker. Upon his return the board accepted his proposal to let Aussems continue to manage first team till the end of the season, while he would go backstage for the preparation for next season.

Aussems and fitness coach Christian Jahan gave a refreshing finish of the season, earning 11 points in 7 matches, but not enough to convince the board for permanent appointment. By the end of the year, based on the fact that the board could not afford to sack but still need Troussier's fame for media exposure and sponsor search, a new agreement with Troussier was reached by announcing his continuous management for another season and reforming the backroom as he wanted. Aussems and Jahan, who were invited in by Troussier to join him at the first place, were released after their relationship with Troussier deteriorated after caretaking the team as the board appointed during the "holiday incident". Troussier brought in Eric Garcin and Rabah Ben Larbi as replacement backroom staffs. His personal assistant David Camhi also returned after an attempt of resignation during "holiday incident" was never accepted by the board.

=== Kaisa Group ===
After Philippe Troussier's tenue came to an end and he was unable to gain promotion for the club it saw Wan Hongwei and the Ruby company actively start to pull funding from the team. This resulted in the July 15, 2014 FA Cup game against Shandong Luneng being delayed by 20 minutes while the Shenzhen players held a banner proclaiming unpaid wages from the owner. After the game in which Shenzhen lost 5–0 the club's manager Li Yi defended his team on their actions. On January 16, 2015, the owners officially announced that they had sold-off 55 percent of the shares within the club and the club's official name had changed to Shenzhen Municipal Football Club Co., Ltd. On October 27, 2015, Deng Junjie (邓俊杰) and the Hong Kong Honghu Capital Group took over the club. On 12 April 2016, property development company the Kaisa Group held a ceremony to proclaim their ownership of the club.

In the 2018 China League One, the team pulled off a last-round comeback to finish second ahead of Zhejiang Greentown, who held the second place for the last 13 rounds, and earned promotion back to the top division after a 7-year absence. The team, upon promotion, though, only finished 15th out of 16th, yet were saved from relegation when Tianjin Tianhai filed for bankruptcy.

In the 2020 season, due to the COVID-19 pandemic, the China Super League structure was transformed as a tournament based league. In the Dalian Division, Shenzhen FC recorded 5W-2D-7L in the division ranked 5th to get into the relegation playoff. In the first round of the relegation playoff, Shenzhen FC lost to Tianjin Teda in aggregate 1–3. In the second round of the playoff, Shenzhen FC beat Shijiazhuang Yongchang in aggregate 3–2 to avoid the relegation. In the final playoff in 2020 China Super League, Shenzhen FC beat Qingdao Huanghai in aggregate 4–1, which made Shenzhen FC finally ranked 13th in China Super League. John Mary scored 13 goals in total ranked 3rd in the top scorers following Cedric Bakambu and Paulinho.

In the first period of 2021 season, Jordi Cruyff's team recorded 2W-2D-1L in first five games. On June 3, Shenzhen FC made an announcement that Jordi Cruyff stepped down as the head coach of the club and will work for the Barcelona. Also the same day, after a friendly negotiation, Shenzhen FC decided to hire José Carlos Granero as the head coach of the club.

On 22 January 2024, Shenzhen announced the dissolution of the club, after finishing last place in the 2023 Chinese Super League season and getting relegated back down to the second-tier.

== Name history ==
- 1994–95: Shenzhen F.C. (深圳F.C.)
- 1996: Shenzhen Feiyada (深圳飞亚达)
- 1997–98: Shenzhen Ping An (深圳平安)
- 1999: Shenzhen Ping An Insurance (深圳平安保险)
- 2000–01: Shenzhen Ping An Kejian (深圳平安科健)
- 2002: Shenzhen Ping An Insurance (深圳平安保险)
- 2003–05: Shenzhen Jianlibao (深圳健力宝)
- 2006–07: Shenzhen Kingway (深圳金威)
- 2007–08: Shenzhen Xiangxue Eisiti (Note: Eisiti was also known as Shangqingyin, a product of Xiangxue Pharmaceutical) (深圳香雪上清饮)
- 2009: Shenzhen Asia Travel (Lejun) F.C. (深圳亚旅 (乐君))
- 2009–14: Shenzhen Ruby F.C. (深圳红钻)
- 2015–24: Shenzhen F.C. (深圳F.C.)

== Youth programme ==
Since 2018, the club has developed a grassroots football program aimed at improving football in the city and in young people. They developed youth teams in collaboration with the local education ministry in Shenzhen. Currently, the club has different teams of young players, from U13 to U19. The director of the youth training department was Wang Yidi. The Spanish coach, Roberto Mickel Abrante, serves as scouting director and deputy to the youth soccer department in this project.

== Kits ==
When Ping An Insurance took over the club they incorporated their own logo of a giant A that emphasizes the An in their name as the club's new badge and predominantly used green as the club's home colours while red tops with white shorts was the preferred option for their away kits. When Jianlibao Group took over they too decided to change the club's badge, however they decided not to use their own logo as the club's new badge and decided to choose a new design of wings over an orange background that would also be the club's new home colours while green was converted to their away uniforms. When the Jianlibao Group left, the club's Chairman Yang Saixin started to make blue the club's home colours while also changing the club's badge, initially they were two dragons until the 2009 league season saw it changed to a bird flying over a giant football.

=== Kit evolution ===
1998–99	2000–03	2004–2006	2007–2010	2011–2012

== Last squad ==
As of 21 February 2024

Note: Flags indicate national team as defined under FIFA eligibility rules; some limited exceptions apply. Players may hold more than one non-FIFA nationality.

No.	Pos.	Nation	Player
1	GK	CHN	Wei Minzhe
5	DF	CHN	Tian Ziyi
6	DF	CHN	Pei Shuai
7	FW	GHA	Frank Acheampong
9	MF	TPE	Will Donkin
10	MF	FRA	Romain Alessandrini
11	DF	CHN	Zhang Yuan
13	DF	CHN	Xu Haofeng
14	MF	CHN	Li Ning
16	MF	CHN	Zheng Dalun
17	MF	CHN	Fu Hao
18	FW	CHN	Chen Xiangyu
19	MF	CHN	Xu Yue
20	MF	CHN	Liu Yue

No.	Pos.	Nation	Player
22	GK	CHN	Dong Chunyu
27	DF	CHN	Yang Boyu
28	DF	CHN	Zhou Xin
30	MF	CHN	Huang Ruifeng
31	GK	CHN	Ge Yifan
32	GK	CHN	Ji Jiabao
33	FW	CHN	Du Yuezheng
34	FW	CHN	Shahsat Hujahmat
35	DF	CHN	Lu Wentao
36	DF	CHN	Chen Guoliang
37	MF	CHN	Hu Jiajin
40	DF	CHN	Lü Jiaqiang
42	MF	CHN	Li Wei
44	MF	GHA	Mubarak Wakaso

== Coaching staff ==
Position	Staff
Head Coach	(China) Xiang Jun
Assistant Coach	(China) Yuan Weiwei
Assistant Coach	(China) Fu Yuan
Goalkeeping coach	(China) Guan Zhen
Leader	(China) Li Taoyu

Source: Club Website

=== Coaching history ===
All-time league coaching history as of the end of the 2023 league season.

Name	Period	Pld	W	D	L	Win%
(China) Hu Zhigang	1994.1 – 1995.12	36	17	14	5	47.22
(China) Zhou Sui'an	1995.12 – 1996.6	11	1	4	6	9.09
(China) Liu Jianjiang	1996.7 – 1997.5	22	7	7	8	31.82
(China) Lu Jianren	1997.5 – 1997.12	11	5	2	4	45.45
(China) Xiao Duoyin	1997.12 – 1998.4	6	0	2	4	0.00
(China) Zeng Xuelin	1998.4 – 1998.7	7	3	3	1	42.86
(South Korea) Cha Bum-kun	1998.7 – 1999.12	39	11	11	17	28.21
(Brazil) Edson Tavares	1999.12 – 2000.5	9	2	1	6	22.22
(China) Zhu Guanghu	2000.5 – 2005.2	121	56	44	21	46.28
(China) Chi Shangbin	2005.2 – 2005.5	9	0	4	5	0.00
(China) Guo Ruilong (Head Coach)	2005.5 – 2005.10	14	4	4	6	28.57
(China) Xie Feng (Head Coach)	2005.10 – 2005.11	3	0	2	1	0.00
(China) Wang Baoshan	2005.11 – 2006.9	23	6	6	11	26.09
(China) Xie Feng (Head Coach)	2006.9 – 2006.12	5	2	0	3	40.00
(China) Zhang Jun	2006.12 – 2007.12	28	5	10	13	17.86
(China) Mai Chao (Head Coach)	2007.12 – 2008.4	1	0	0	1	0.00
(China) Zhang Zengqun	2008.4 – 2009.1	29	8	9	12	27.59
(China) Fan Yuhong	2009.1 – 2009.8	17	4	4	9	23.53
(China) Xie Feng	2009.8 – 2009.12	13	6	6	1	46.15
(Cyprus) Siniša Gogić	2010.2 – 2010.12	30	8	8	14	26.67
(France) Philippe Troussier	2011.2 – 2013.11	90	32	18	40	35.56
(China) Li Yi	2013.11 – 2015.4	34	9	13	12	26.47
(South Korea) Lee Lim-saeng	2015.4 – 2015.8	19	3	8	8	15.79
(Hong Kong) Li Haiqiang	2015.8 – 2015.11	7	3	2	2	42.86
(China) Tang Yaodong	2015.12 – 2016.7	16	7	3	6	43.75
(Netherlands) Clarence Seedorf	2016.7 – 2016.12	14	4	4	6	28.57
(Sweden) Sven-Göran Eriksson	2016.12 – 2017.6	13	5	5	3	38.46
(China) Wang Baoshan	2017.6 – 2018.4	22	9	4	9	40.91
(Spain) López Caro	2018.4 – 2019.7	45	17	11	17	37.78
(Italy) Roberto Donadoni	2019.7 – 2020.8	14	2	4	8	14.29
(China) Zhang Xiaorui (Head Coach)	2020.8 – 2020.9	5	2	2	1	40.00
(Netherlands) Jordi Cruyff	2020.9 – 2021.6	16	7	4	5	43.75
(Spain) José Carlos Granero	2021.6 – 2021.12	15	6	3	6	40.00
(China) Zhang Xiaorui (Head Coach)	2022.1 – 2022.2	2	1	0	1	50.00
(South Korea) Lee Jang-soo (Head Coach)	2022.2 – 2022.9	15	5	1	9	33.33
(China) Zhang Xiaorui (Head Coach)	2022.9 – 2023.4	19	4	2	13	21.05
(China) Chen Tao (Head of the Coaching Staff)	2023.4 – 2023.7	16	3	2	11	18.75
(China) Xiang Jun (Head of the Coaching Staff)	2023.7 –2024.1	14	0	1	13	0.00

== Honours ==
=== League ===
- Chinese Jia-A League / Chinese Super League (Top-tier league)
  - Winners (1): 2004
- Chinese Jia B League / China League One (Second-tier league)
  - Winners (1): 1995
- Chinese Yi League / China League Two (Third-tier league)
  - Winners (1): 1994

=== Cups ===
- Chinese Super League Cup
  - Runners-up: (2) 2004, 2005

== Results ==
All-time league rankings

As of end of 2023 season

Year	Div	Pld	W	D	L	GF	GA	GD	Pts	Pos.	FA Cup	Super Cup	League Cup	AFC	Other		Att./G	Stadium
1994	3	14	5	8	1	32	16	16	6^{1}	W	DNQ	–	–					Shenzhen Stadium
1995	2	22	12	6	4	37	21	16	42	W	DNQ	DNQ	–					Shenzhen Stadium
1996	1	22	3	7	12	13	29	−16	16	11	R1	DNQ	–				18,182	Shenzhen Stadium
1997	2	22	10	6	6	44	34	10	36	RU	R1	DNQ	–					Shenzhen Stadium
1998	1	26	7	9	10	29	43	−14	30	12	R1	DNQ	–				19,000	Shenzhen Stadium
1999	1	26	7	7	12	22	39	−17	28	12	R1	DNQ	–				20,769	Shenzhen Stadium
2000	1	26	8	8	10	27	27	0	32	9	R2	DNQ	–				15,769	Shenzhen Stadium
2001	1	26	13	7	6	34	18	16	46	5	QF	DNQ	–				16,231	Shenzhen Stadium
2002	1	28	14	10	4	42	21	21	52	RU	R2	DNQ	–				15,571	Shenzhen Stadium
2003	1	28	12	11	5	42	21	21	47	4	R1	DNQ	–				18,357	Shenzhen Stadium
2004	1	22	11	9	2	30	13	17	42	W	SF	NH	RU				10,364	Shenzhen Stadium
2005	1	26	4	10	12	22	42	−20	22	12	R2	NH	RU	SF	A3CC	4	2,423	Shenzhen Stadium
2006	1	28	8	6	14	22	42	−20	30	11	QF	NH	NH				10,071	Shenzhen Stadium
2007	1	28	5	10	13	21	42	−21	25	14	NH	NH	NH				13,000	Shenzhen Stadium
2008	1	30	8	9	13	35	34	1	33	12	NH	NH	NH				6,400	Shenzhen Stadium
2009	1	30	10	10	10	36	40	−4	37^{2}	11	NH	NH	NH				13,460	Shenzhen Stadium
2010	1	30	8	8	14	34	41	−7	32	12	NH	NH	NH				12,439	Shenzhen Stadium
2011	1	30	5	8	17	27	53	−26	23	16	R1	NH	NH				10,277	Huizhou Olympic Stadium, Bao'an Stadium
2012	2	30	12	6	12	46	41	5	42	7	R3	DNQ	NH				6,448	Bao'an Stadium
2013	2	30	15	4	11	50	57	−7	49	5	R3	DNQ	NH				6,666	Bao'an Stadium
2014	2	30	9	10	11	35	38	−3	37	8	R3	DNQ	NH				6,011	Bao'an Stadium
2015	2	30	6	13	11	37	48	−11	31	12	R3	DNQ	NH				11,557	Shenzhen Stadium
2016	2	30	11	7	12	36	43	−7	40	9	R2	DNQ	NH				10,152	Shenzhen Stadium
2017	2	30	13	4	10	56	37	19	46	6	R3	DNQ	NH				12,764	Shenzhen Stadium
2018	2	30	15	8	7	57	34	23	53	RU	R3	DNQ	NH				7,507	Shenzhen Stadium
2019	1	30	4	9	17	31	57	-26	21	15	R4	DNQ	NH				16,279	Shenzhen Universiade Sports Centre
2020	1	20	8	4	8	28	26	2	-^{3}	13	R1	DNQ	NH					
2021	1	22	9	5	8	33	29	4	32	6	QF	DNQ	NH					
2022	1	34	9	3	22	29	74	-45	30	14	R2	DNQ	NH					
2023	1	30	3	3	24	22	79	-57	12	16	R3	DNQ	NH				7,946	Shenzhen Universiade Sports Centre, Bao'an Stadium

- ^1 In final group stage. ^2 Deducted 3 points for causing delay in the 30 August 2009 match against Shenhua. ^3 Due to the COVID-19 control the league was held in a tournament mode.

Key

	China top division
	China second division
	China third division
W	Winners
RU	Runners-up
3	Third place
	Relegated

- Pld = Played
- W = Games won
- D = Games drawn
- L = Games lost
- F = Goals for
- A = Goals against
- Pts = Points
- Pos = Final position
- DNQ = Did not qualify
- DNE = Did not enter
- NH = Not Held
- – = Does Not Exist
- R1 = Round 1
- R2 = Round 2
- R3 = Round 3
- R4 = Round 4
- F = Final
- SF = Semi-finals
- QF = Quarter-finals
- R16 = Round of 16
- Group = Group stage
- GS2 = Second Group stage
- QR1 = First Qualifying Round
- QR2 = Second Qualifying Round
- QR3 = Third Qualifying Round

=== Continental results ===
Season	Competition	Round	Opposition	Home	Away	Rank /Agg.
2005	AFC Champions League	Group stage	(Japan) Júbilo Iwata	1–0	0–3	1st
2005	AFC Champions League	Group stage	(South Korea) Suwon Samsung Bluewings	1–0	0–0	1st
2005	AFC Champions League	Group stage	(Vietnam) Hoang Anh Gia Lai	5–0	2–0	1st
2005	AFC Champions League	Quarter-finals	(Saudi Arabia) Al-Ahli	3–1 (a.e.t.)	1–2	4–3 (a.e.t.)
2005	AFC Champions League	Semi-finals	(United Arab Emirates) Al Ain	0–0	0–6	0–6

== See also ==
- Xiangxue Eisiti (Hong Kong), the era that the reserve team of Shenzhen F.C., played in Hong Kong
