= Mohammad Sadeghi (footballer, born 1952) =

Iranian footballer

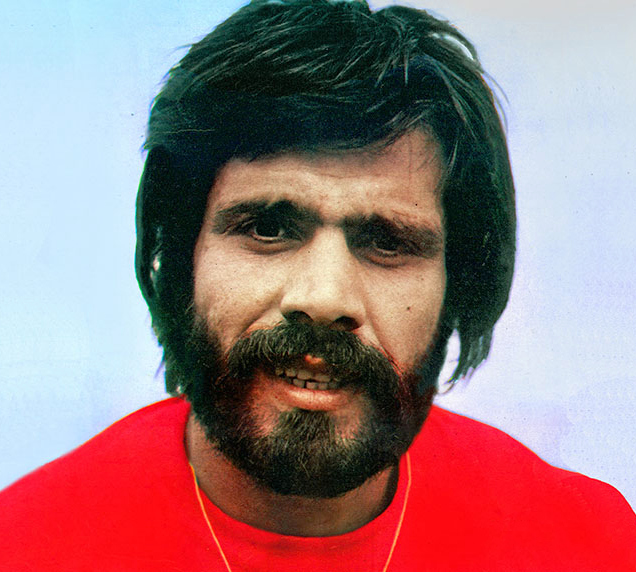

Personal information
- Full name: Mohammad Sadeghi
- Date of birth: March 16, 1952 (age 74)
- Place of birth: Ahvaz, Iran
- Height: 1.73 m (5 ft 8 in)
- Position: Midfielder

Senior career*
Years	Team	Apps	(Gls)
–1971	Gomrok Ahvaz F.C.		
1971–1978	Pas F.C.		
1978–1980	Persepolis		
1980–1986	Shahin F.C.		

International career
1972–1978	Iran	38	(4)
- * Club domestic league appearances and goals

Mohammad Sadeghi (born March 16, 1952) is a retired Iranian football player.

== Club career ==
He played for Gomrok Ahvaz F.C., Pas F.C., Persepolis F.C. and Shahin F.C. He was one of the key players of Pas winning the Iranian Takht Jamshid in 1977 and 1978, of Persepolis F.C. winning the Iranian nationwide tournament Espandi Cup and the Tehran Hazfi Cup in 1979 as well as of Shahin winning the Tehran Cup in 1981.

== International career ==
Sadeghi made 38 appearances for the Iran national football team and played at the 1972 Olympics and 1978 FIFA World Cup. He was also a member of the Iranian teams that won the football tournament at the 1974 Asian Games and the 1976 Asian Cup.
