= Qi Wusheng =

Chinese footballer and coach

Qi Wusheng 戚务生
Personal information
- Full name: Qi Wusheng
- Date of birth: 20 May 1944 (age 82)
- Place of birth: Weihai, Shandong, China
- Height: 1.83 m (6 ft 0 in)
- Position: Centre back

Youth career
- Liaoning Youth

Senior career*
Years	Team	Apps	(Gls)
1962–1964	Liaoning Workers		
1964–1965	Liaoning team		

International career
1965–1976	China	11	(0)

Managerial career
- 1978–1979: Somalia
- 1979–1986: China U19
- 1980–1982: China Hopes
- 1983–1985: China (assistant)
- 1986–1988: Guangzhou team
- 1989–1993: Dalian team
- 1994–1997: China
- 1998: Wuhan Hongjinlong
- 1999–2003: Yunnan Hongta
- 2004: Tianjin Teda
- 2006: Guangzhou Pharmaceutical
- 2015: Meizhou Hakka
Medal record
Men's football
Representing China
AFC Asian Cup
Bronze medal – third place	1976 Iran	Team
- * Club domestic league appearances and goals

Qi Wusheng (Chinese: 戚务生; pinyin: Qī Wùshēng; Mandarin pronunciation: [tɕʰí.û ʂə́ŋ]; born 20 May 1944, in Weihai) is a Chinese football coach and a former international player.

== Playing career ==
Despite being born in Shandong, Qi would go on to play for teams within Liaoning before he would be selected for the Chinese national team. As a footballer, he played as a centre back and was known for his extraordinary ability and superb running game. His wealth of experience was limited due to the Chinese Cultural Revolution. However, he was still able to play within the 1976 AFC Asian Cup and help China to a third-place finish before he retired.

== Managerial career ==
After he retired from playing, Qi took the Somalia head coach position with little success before returning to China, where he mainly took on numerous coaching positions for youth teams or as assistant manager for adult clubs.

After years of working his way up through these positions, in the 1986 league season he took on his first major job within China as the Guangzhou team Head coach where he guided them to seventh in the league. His management saw Guangzhou become a mid-table team for the next several years until Dalian became interested in Qi Wusheng's coaching style of a focused, solid defense to act as the basis for the team's attack.

After winning the Chinese FA Cup in 1992 with Dalian, the Chinese national team became interested with his services after they replaced Klaus Schlappner as the head coach. Qi would go on to manage the national team to a silver medal in the 1994 Asian Games football tournament. While he experienced some success with the team, he could not guide China to a place in the FIFA World Cup and was replaced by Bob Houghton after he resigned. He would take a position with Wuhan Hongjinlong before spending several seasons with Yunnan Hongta F.C. until the club merged with Chongqing Lifan F.C. and Qi was released.

After a short spell with Tianjin Teda F.C. he would return to Guangzhou to help manage them to push for promotion back into the top tier; unable to achieve this, he would leave at the end of the 2006 league season.

== Honours ==
=== As a player ===
China

- AFC Asian Cup Third Place: 1976

=== As a manager ===
Dalian

- Chinese FA Cup: 1992

Meizhou Kejia

- China League Two: 2015

China

- Asian Games Silver medal: 1994

Sporting positions
Preceded by Gao Fengwen	China national football team captain 1973-1976	Succeeded by Xiang Hengqing
