= Garnik Shahbandari =

Iranian footballer

Personal information
- Date of birth: 1954 (age 71–72)
- Place of birth: Tehran, Iran
- Positions: Midfielder; forward

Senior career*
Years	Team	Apps	(Gls)
- Bank Melli F.C.
- Daraei F.C.
- Ararat

International career
1976	Iran	2	(0)
- * Club domestic league appearances and goals

Garnik Shahbandari is an Iranian football midfielder of Armenian descent who played for Iran in the 1976 Asian Cup. He also played for Bankemeli, Daraei and Ararat football clubs.

== Honours ==
- Asian Cup:

Winner : 1976
