= Sahameddin Mirfakhraei =

Iranian footballer

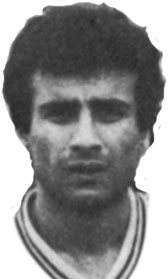

Personal information
- Date of birth: February 4, 1951 (age 75)
- Place of birth: Iran
- Position: Defender

Senior career*
Years	Team	Apps	(Gls)
- Homa

International career
1974–1977	Iran	7	(0)
- * Club domestic league appearances and goals

Sahameddin Mirfakhraei is an Iranian football defender who played for Iran in the 1976 Asian Cup and 1976 summer olympics. He also played for Homa F.C.

== Honours ==
- Asian Cup:

Winner : 1976

- Takht Jamshid Cup:

Third : 1973

- Takht Jamshid Cup:

Second : 1974

- South Korea President Park's cup:

Third : 1975

- Tehran football league:

Winner : 1981
