= Heshmat Mohajerani =

Iranian footballer and manager (born 1939)

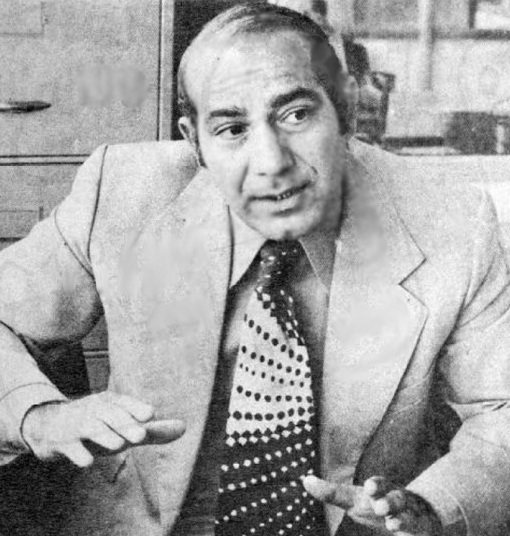
- Mohajerani in 1977 after match against Hungary

Personal information
- Full name: Heshmatollah Mohajerani
- Date of birth: 13 December 1939 (age 86)
- Place of birth: Mashhad, Iran
- Position: Midfielder

Youth career
- 1955–1958: Aboomoslem (Amateur)
- 1959–1960: Deyhim (Taj)

Senior career*
Years	Team	Apps	(Gls)
1961–1963	Taj		
1963–1968	Pas		

Managerial career
- 1971–1976: Iran U-20
- 1972–1975: Iran U-23
- 1973–1975: FC Barcelona (assistant)
- 1975–1978: Iran
- 1979–1980: Al-Shaab
- 1980–1984: United Arab Emirates
- 1984–1986: Al-Wahda
- 1992–1994: Oman
- 1998–1999: Al-Ahli
- * Club domestic league appearances and goals

Heshmatollah Mohajerani (Persian: حشمت الله مهاجرانى, born 13 December 1939) is a retired Iranian association football midfielder and manager.

== Early life and playing career ==
Mohajerani was born to Asadoolah Mohajerani and Leila Nassiri in a family of six siblings. After years, his family moved to Tehran and his older brothers began playing football in Taj's youth teams. At the age of 20, Mohajerani also joined Taj SC (now known as Esteghlal) and retired after the 1969 World Military Cup held in Greece.

== Personal life ==
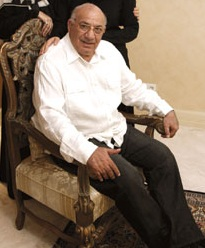
Mohajerani in 2006 in his house in Tehran

Mohajerani married Zari Sheikhan in 1969.

On 15 January 2026, Mohajerani criticized FIFA's silence on the 2025-2026 Iranian protests, in which several football players and coaches have been killed, saying "You have closed your eyes to the killing of our innocent people. History will judge you." On 27 January, he wrote on his Instagram: "Together, just as a team goes through the most difficult games, we will also pass through this historical stage. The final victory belongs to your perseverance."

== Managerial statistics ==
Team	Nat	From	To	Record				
Team	Nat	From	To	G	W	D	L	Win %
Iran U-20	(Iran)	January 1971	February 1976	35	26	7	2	74.29
Iran U-23	(Iran)	March 1972	August 1975	10	8	2	0	80.00
Iran	(Iran)	August 1975	September 1978	28	15	7	6	53.57
Al-Shaab	(United Arab Emirates)	July 1979	July 1980	30	19	6	5	63.33
United Arab Emirates	(United Arab Emirates)	July 1980	December 1984	26	10	4	12	38.46
Al-Wahda	(United Arab Emirates)	December 1984	June 1986	52	34	10	8	65.38
Oman	(Oman)	May 1992	June 1994	11	3	5	3	27.27
Al-Ahli	(Qatar)	January 1998	May 1999	38	21	10	7	55.26
Total				217	126	48	43	58.06

== Honours ==
=== Playing honours ===
Taj

- Tehran Football League: 1960, 1962, 1964, Runner-up 1959
- Tehran Hazfi Cup: 1959

=== Managerial honours ===
Iran U-20

- Asian Youth Championship: 1973, 1974, 1975, 1976

Iran

- AFC Asian Cup: 1976
- Summer Olympic Games: Quarter-final 1976
- FIFA World Cup Qualification: 1978

Al-Shaab

- UAE President's Cup: Runner-up 1979–80

UAE

- Arabian Gulf Cup: Third-place 1982

Al-Wahda

- UAE Union Cup: 1985

Al-Ahli

- Emir of Qatar Cup: Runner-up 1997–98
- Sheikh Jassem Cup: Runner-up 1998–99
