= Shahid Shiroudi Stadium =

Sports stadium in Tehran, Iran

Coordinates: 35°42′37″N 51°25′39″E

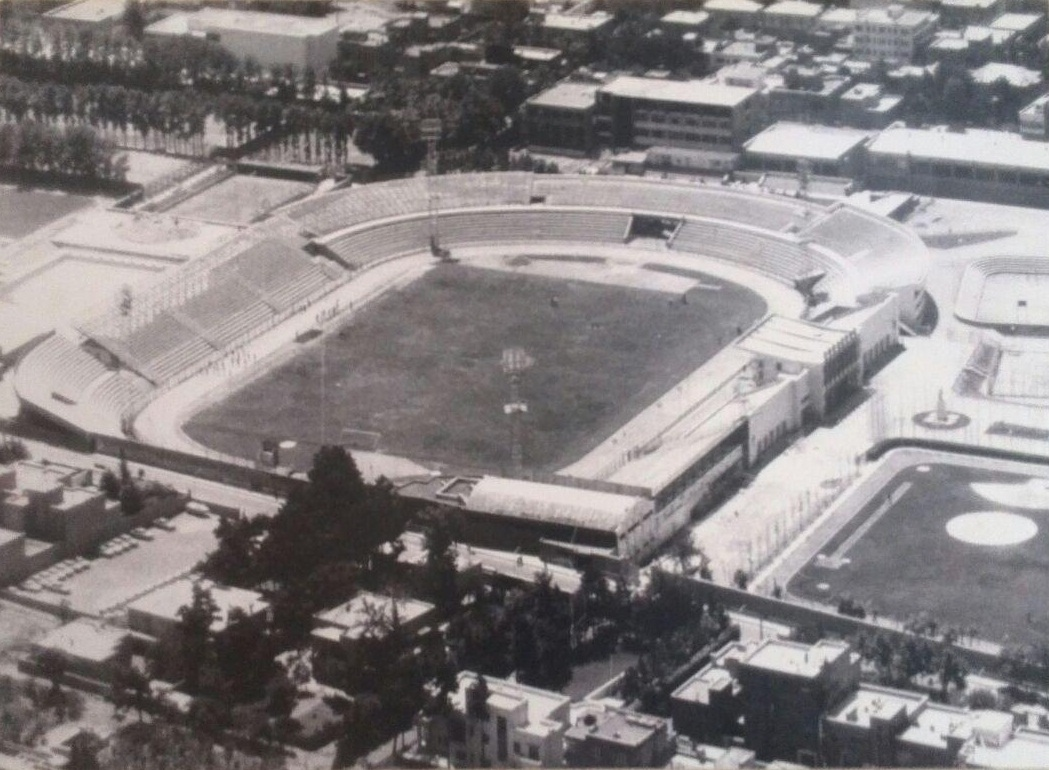
- Amjadieh Stadium during 1960s
- Interactive map of Shahid Shiroudi Stadium
- Full name: Shahid Shiroudi Stadium
- Former names: Amjadieh Stadium (1939–1981)
- Location: Tehran, Iran
- Owner: Ministry of Sport and Youth (Iran)
- Capacity: 25,000 (Football)
- Surface: Grass

Construction
- Built: 1939
- Opened: 1939
- Closed: 2015

Tenants
- Iran national football team (1942–1971); Shahin F.C. (1942–1966); Taj SC (1945–1974)

The Shahid Shiroudi Stadium (Persian: ورزشگاه شهید شیرودی), formerly known as Amjadieh Stadium (Persian: ورزشگاه امجدیه), is a sports stadium in Tehran, Iran. It is currently used for athletics and held football matches until 2009.

The stadium is able to seat 30,000 people and was opened in 1942. It was called Amjadieh Stadium (Persian: امجدیه) until the Iranian Revolution.

In September 2015 it was announced the stadium and the complex would undergo a massive renovation.

== History ==
The stadium is one of the oldest sports stadiums in Iran. It was built from 1934 and inaugurated in 1942^{,} and was located in the northern part of Tehran at the time of opening, while it is now in the center of Tehran. In 1934, French architect Maxime Siroux began designing and constructing Amjadieh Stadium with the capacity of 15,000. Reza Shah approved and ordered similar stadiums across Iran. Siroux later designed and constructed the Hafezieh Stadium in Shiraz. The stadium has played host to many sporting, cultural, and national events as well as political meetings. Ever since Iran national football team was formed, they played their home matches in Amjadieh Stadium before Aryamehr Stadium was constructed. It was also home to Taj S.C. (Esteghlal F.C.) and Persepolis F.C. before Azadi Stadium was built. It was also home to Shahin F.C. before and after the Iranian Revolution.

It has also hosted the 1968 AFC Asian Cup finals. The Asian Club Championship was also held in Amjadieh Stadium in 1970. Additionally, Amjadieh stadium along with Aryamehr Stadium and Apadana Stadium (under the name of Persepolis stadium) was the host of preliminary round of the football matches at the 1974 Asian Games. The stadium has also been the venue for the AFC Youth Championship 2000.

== Cultural, political and military operations ==
- During the Coronation of the Mohammad Reza Shah and the Shahbanou of Iran in 1967, many events took place in Amjadieh Stadium, including the Coronation Parade.
- The stadium was to be the final departing site for Operation Eagle Claw and, after its failure, Operation Credible Sport, the aborted missions to rescue 52 American hostages being held in Tehran during the Iran Hostage Crisis. The proposed extraction would have involved a rescue force being transported to the embassy, releasing the hostages, and then escorting the hostages across the main road in front of the embassy to the stadium, where helicopters (Eagle Claw) or a modified C-130 (Credible Sport) would have retrieved the entire contingent.
- On February 24, 1981, the Mojahedin-e-Khalq party held its public meeting in Tehran at the Amjadieh Stadium, around 40,000 people attended.

== Naming ==
The stadium was named after Shahid Ali Akbar Shiroodi (Persian: علی‌اکبر شیرودی), a Cobra helicopter pilot who was killed in the Iran–Iraq War.

== Gallery ==
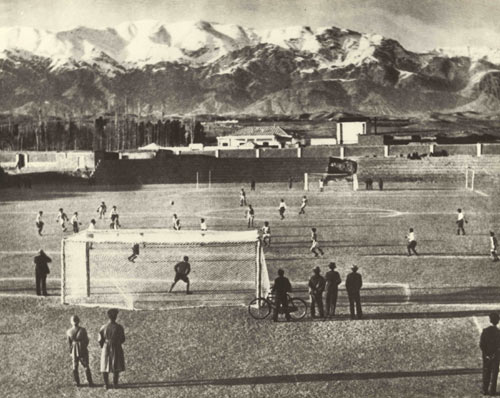
_{Amjadieh Stadium in 1940s}

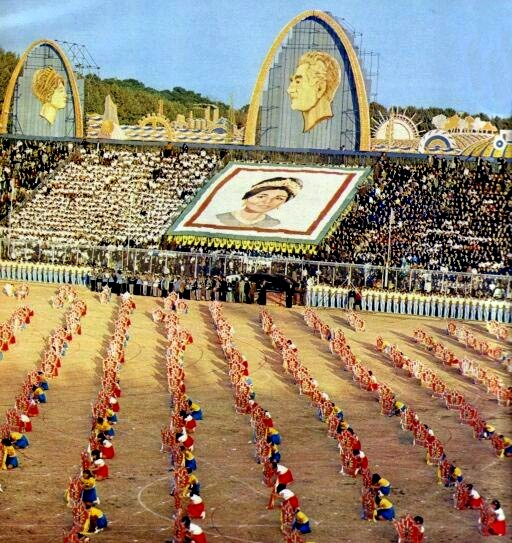
_{Parts of the Coronation ceremony of Mohammad Reza Shah and Farah Pahlavi held in Amjadieh Stadium}

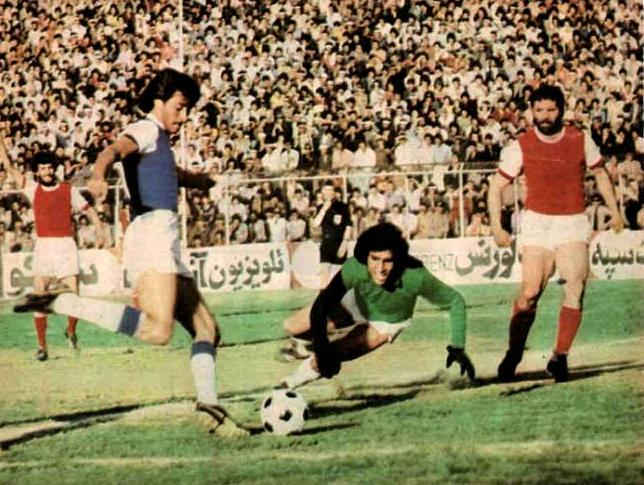
_{Persepolis - Taj derby in Amjadieh}

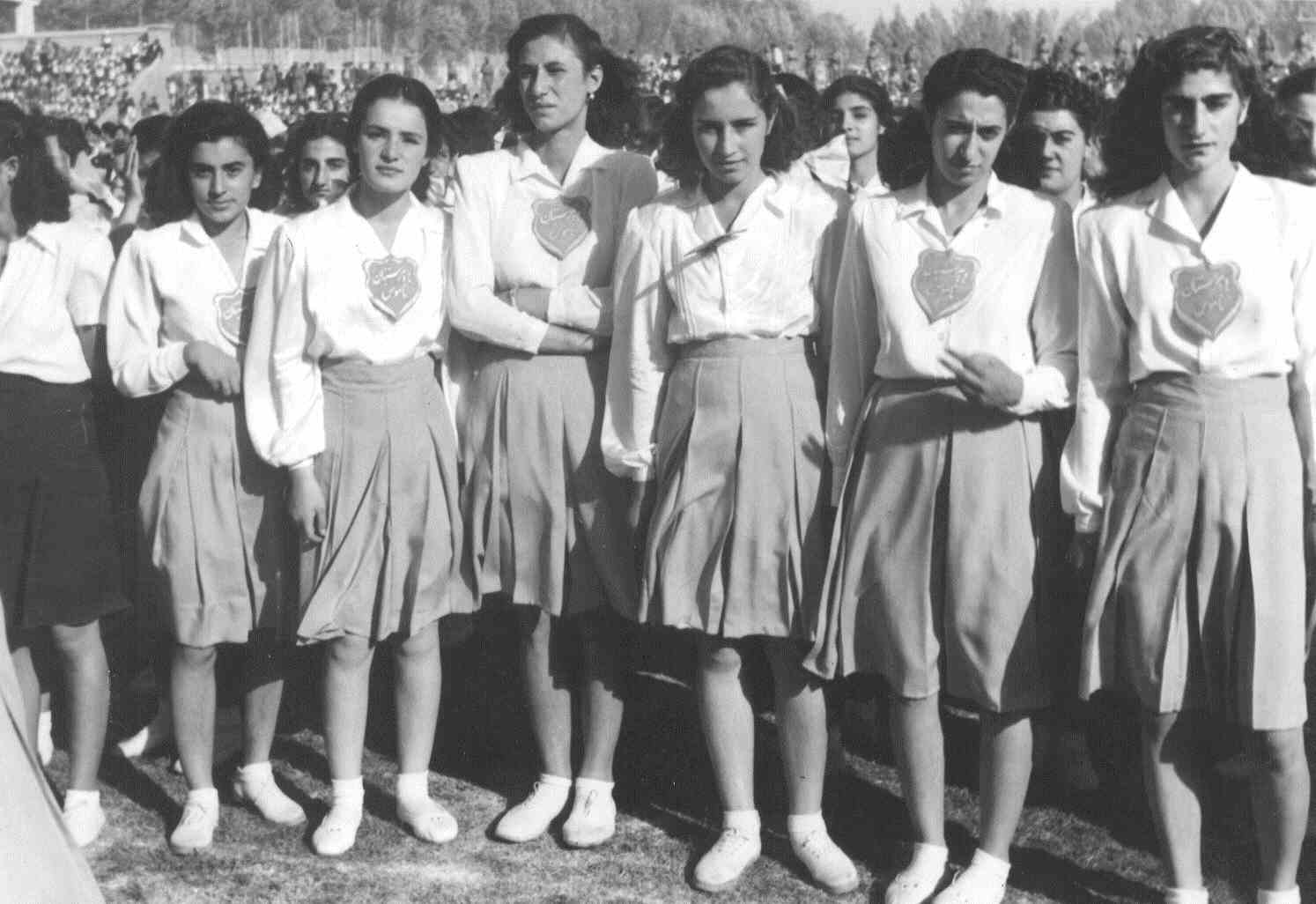
_{High school students in a Ceremony in Amjadieh Stadium, Tehran, 1948}

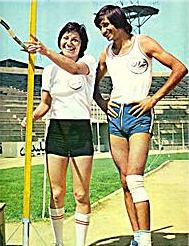
_{Maryam Sedarati and Teymour Ghiasi in 1973 during a practice in the Amjadieh Stadium}

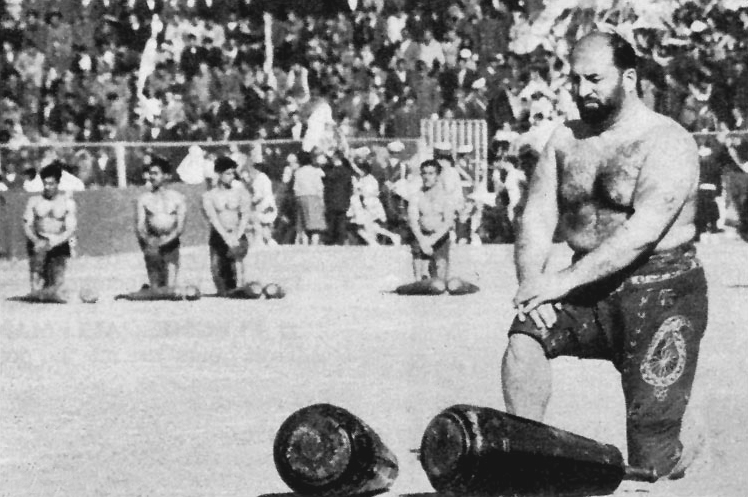
_{Shaban Jafari during the performance of Pahlevani and zoorkhaneh rituals in Amjadieh Stadium}

Preceded by Ramat Gan Stadium (Israel) Ramat Gan	AFC Asian Cup; Host Venue; 1968	Succeeded by National Stadium (Thailand) Bangkok
