= Alireza Azizi =

Iranian footballer (1949–2021)

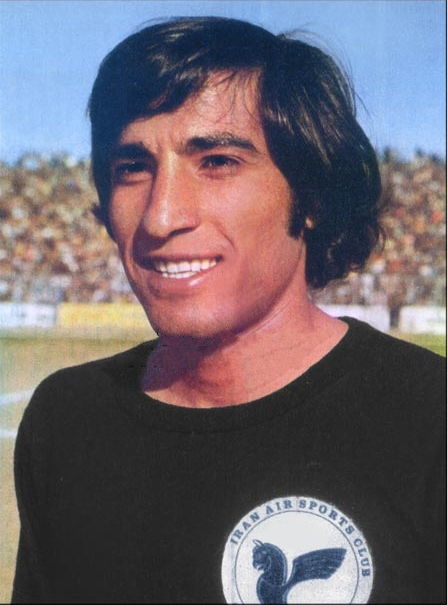
- Azizi in the 1970s

Personal information
- Date of birth: 14 January 1949
- Place of birth: Abadan, Iran
- Date of death: 7 August 2021 (aged 72)
- Place of death: Tehran, Iran
- Position: Midfielder

Senior career*
Years	Team	Apps	(Gls)
1972–1975	Homa		
1975–1979	Persepolis	103	(0)
1979	Bank Melli		

International career
1972–1976	Iran	9	(2)
- * Club domestic league appearances and goals

Alireza Azizi (Persian: علیرضا عزیزی; 14 January 1949 – 7 August 2021) was an Iranian footballer who played as a midfielder.

Azizi was the second child in a family of five siblings. He started his professional career in Homa, where he would reach the third place in the Iranian league in 1975. Afterwards he changed to Persepolis F.C., where he would win the Iranian championship in 1976 and reach the runner-up position in 1977 and in 1978. After the Iranian Revolution he remained playing for Persepolis winning the Iranian nationwide tournament Espandi Cup before changing to Bank Melli F.C.

He was a member of the Iranian squad competing in the football tournament of the Olympic Tournament in Munich in 1972, winning the Asia Cup 1976 in Tehran and reaching the quarterfinals of the Olympic Tournament in Montreal in 1976.

Azizi died at the age of 72 on 7 August 2021.

== Career statistics ==
=== International goals ===
Scores and results list Iran's goal tally first, score column indicates score after each Azizi goal.

List of international goals scored by Alireza Azizi
No.	Date	Venue	Opponent	Score	Result	Competition
1	8 June 1976	Aryamehr Stadium, Tehran, Iran	South Yemen		8–0	1976 AFC Asian Cup
2	8 June 1976	Aryamehr Stadium, Tehran, Iran	South Yemen		8–0	1976 AFC Asian Cup
