= Alireza Khorshidi =

Iranian footballer (born 1951)

Personal information
- Date of birth: 16 May 1951 (age 75)
- Place of birth: Khorramabad, Iran
- Position: Forward

Senior career*
Years	Team	Apps	(Gls)
- Homa

International career
1971–1977	Iran	18	(5)
- * Club domestic league appearances and goals

Alireza Khorshidi (born 16 May 1951) is an Iranian retired football forward who played for Iran from 1971 to 1978. He competed in the 1976 Asian Cup where Iran won their third championship title. He also played for Iran at the 1976 Summer Olympics. Khorshidi played club football for Homa.

== Honours ==
- Asian Cup:

Winner : 1976
