= 1976 AFC Asian Cup =

Asian Cup Iran 1976 جام ملت‌های آسیا ۱۹۷۶

Tournament details
- Host country: Iran
- Dates: 3–13 June
- Teams: 6
- Venues: 2 (in 2 host cities)

Final positions
- Champions: Iran (3rd title)
- Runners-up: Kuwait
- Third place: China
- Fourth place: Iraq

Tournament statistics
- Matches played: 10
- Goals scored: 25 (2.5 per match)
- Attendance: 334,000 (33,400 per match)
- Top scorer(s): (Kuwait) Fathi Kamel (Iran) Gholam Hossein Mazloumi (Iran) Nasser Nouraei (3 goals each)
- Best player: (Iran) Ali Parvin

The 1976 AFC Asian Cup (Persian: جام ملت‌های آسیا ۱۹۷۶) was the sixth international association football championship for members of the Asian Football Confederation (AFC). Hosted by Iran, the competition ran from 3 to 13 June 1976 and was contested by the national teams of China, Iran, Iraq, Kuwait, Malaysia and South Yemen.

The final was contested by two-time defending champions Iran and Kuwait. Ali Parvin scored the only goal of the match as Iran won the competition for the third time.

== Background ==
The inaugural AFC Asian Cup was held in Hong Kong in 1956. Iran were two-time defending champions after winning all four of their matches in the round-robin tournament in 1968 and defeating South Korea 2–1 in the final of the previous tournament in 1972. South Korea and Iran were the most successful teams in the history of the competition, having both won the title twice previously.

== Qualification ==
As holders and hosts, Iran were the only team to qualify automatically. In total, 30 teams were included in the qualifying draw but 13 would withdraw without playing a match.

The teams were split geographically into four qualifying groups of various sizes. Kuwait and South Yemen qualified by default from group one after the remaining four teams withdrew. Iraq and Saudi Arabia qualified as winners and runners-up from group two respectively. In group three, Malaysia and Thailand qualified as winners and runners-up respectively. North Korea and China qualified as group four winners and runners-up respectively.

After qualifying, Saudi Arabia, North Korea and Thailand all withdrew and the competition went ahead with just six teams instead of nine.

=== Participants ===
Nations qualified for the 1976 AFC Asian Cup
Team	Qualified as	Qualified on	Previous appearance
Iran	Hosts	N/A	2 (1968, 1972)
Kuwait	Group 1	1975	1 (1972)
South Yemen	Group 1	1975	0 (debut)
Iraq	Group 2 winners	2 December 1975	1 (1972)
~~Saudi Arabia~~	Group 2 runners-up	2 December 1975	0
~~North Korea~~	Group 3 winners	24 June 1975	0
China	Group 3 runners-up	23 June 1975	0 (debut)
Malaysia	Group 4 winners	23 March 1975	0 (debut)
~~Thailand~~	Group 4 runners-up	24 March 1975	1 (1972)

== Format ==
The six teams were drawn into two single round robin groups of three teams. The group winners and runners-up would contest the semi-finals which would decide the teams contesting the final and the third-place play-off.

== Venues ==
Matches were played at the Aryamehr Stadium in Tehran and the Reza Pahlavi Stadium in Tabriz.

1976 AFC Asian Cup is located in Iran	Tehran	Tabriz
1976 AFC Asian Cup is located in Iran	Aryamehr Stadium	Reza Pahlavi Stadium
1976 AFC Asian Cup is located in Iran	Capacity: 100,000	Capacity: 25,000

== Group stage ==
=== Group A ===
Kuwait and China advanced to the semi-finals.

==== Table ====
Pos	Team	Pld	W	D	L	GF	GA	GD	Pts	Qualification
1	Kuwait	2	2	0	0	3	0	+3	4	Advance to semi-finals
2	China	2	0	1	1	1	2	−1	1	Advance to semi-finals
3	Malaysia	2	0	1	1	1	3	−2	1	

==== Matches ====
3 June 1976
17:00

Kuwait	2–0	Malaysia
Al-Anberi 10'; Al-Dakhil 42'

Reza Pahlavi Stadium, Tabriz
Attendance: 25,000
Referee: Alex Wazs (India)

5 June 1976
17:00

China	1–1	Malaysia
Wang Jilian 89'		Mokhtar 50'

Reza Pahlavi Stadium, Tabriz
Attendance: 10,000
Referee: Talib Sabar (Qatar)

7 June 1976
17:00

Kuwait	1–0	China
Kameel 1'

Reza Pahlavi Stadium, Tabriz
Attendance: 15,000
Referee: Adolf Matius (Austria)

=== Group B ===
Iran and Iraq advanced to the semi-finals.

==== Table ====
Pos	Team	Pld	W	D	L	GF	GA	GD	Pts	Qualification
1	Iran	2	2	0	0	10	0	+10	4	Advance to semi-finals
2	Iraq	2	1	0	1	1	2	−1	2	Advance to semi-finals
3	South Yemen	2	0	0	2	0	9	−9	0	

==== Matches ====
4 June 1976
18:00

Iran	2–0	Iraq
Nouraei 45'; Roshan 57'

Aryamehr Stadium, Tehran
Attendance: 50,000
Referee: Marijan Raus (Yugoslavia)

6 June 1976
18:00

Iraq	1–0	South Yemen
Waal 86'

Aryamehr Stadium, Tehran
Attendance: 1,000
Referee: Ibrahim Aido (Bahrain)

8 June 1976
18:00

Iran	8–0	South Yemen
Azizi 17', 73'; Nouraei 40', 42'; Khorshidi 45'; Mazloumi 63', 74', 80'

Aryamehr Stadium, Tehran
Attendance: 10,000
Referee: Ikramul Haq (India)

== Semi-finals ==
Kuwait defeated Iraq and Iran defeated China, both after extra time, to advance to the final.

11 June 1976
18:00

Kuwait	3–2 (a.e.t.)	Iraq
Ibrahim 17'; Kameel 77', 100'		Abdul-Jalil 41'; Hassan 85'

Aryamehr Stadium, Tehran
Attendance: 60,000
Referee: Harpajan Singh Dhillon (Singapore)

11 June 1976
20:00

Iran	2–0 (a.e.t.)	China
Khorshidi 100'; Roshan 119'

Aryamehr Stadium, Tehran
Attendance: 60,000
Referee: Toshio Asami (Japan)

== Third-place play-off ==
He Jia scored the only goal as China defeated Iraq to finish third.

13 June 1976
18:00

Iraq	0–1	China
		He Jia 66'

Aryamehr Stadium, Tehran
Attendance: 20,000
Referee: Ruslan Hatta (Indonesia)

== Final ==
Parvin scored the only goal of the match as Iran defeated Kuwait to win the tournament.

13 June 1976
20:00

Iran	1–0	Kuwait
Parvin 73'

Aryamehr Stadium, Tehran
Attendance: 112,000
Referee: Jean Dubach (Switzerland)

== Goalscorers ==
There were 25 goals scored in 10 matches, for an average of 2.5 goals per match.

3 goals

- (Iran) Gholam Hossein Mazloumi
- (Iran) Nasser Nouraei
- (Kuwait) Fathi Kameel

2 goals

- (Iran) Alireza Azizi
- (Iran) Alireza Khorshidi
- (Iran) Hassan Roshan

1 goal

- (China) He Jia
- (China) Wang Jilian
- (Iran) Ali Parvin
- (Iraq) Falah Hassan
- (Iraq) Kadhim Waal
- (Iraq) Sabah Abdul-Jalil
- (Kuwait) Abdulaziz Al-Anberi
- (Kuwait) Faisal Al-Dakhil
- (Kuwait) Farouq Ibrahim
- (Malaysia) Mokhtar Dahari
