= 1996 Chinese Jia-A League =

Football competition

Chinese Jia-A League
- Season: 1996
- Champions: Dalian Wanda (2nd title)
- Relegated: Shenzhen Feiyada; Guangzhou Songri
- Asian Club Championship: Dalian Wanda
- Matches: 132
- Goals: 292 (2.21 per match)
- Top goalscorer: Su Maozhen (13 goals)
- Average attendance: 24,266

The 1996 Chinese Jia-A League season (known as Marlboro Jia-A League for sponsorship reasons) was the third season of professional association football and the 35th top-tier overall league season held in China. Starting on April 14 and ending on October 27, Dalian Wanda won their second championship title.

== Promotion and relegation ==
Teams promoted from 1995 Chinese Jia-B League

- Shenzhen Feiyada
- Guangzhou Songri

Teams relegated from 1995 Chinese Jia-A League

- Qingdao Hainiu
- Liaoning

== Overview ==
It was contested by 12 teams, and Dalian Wanda won the championship.

== Personnel ==
Team	Manager
August 1st	
Beijing Guoan	(China) Jin Zhiyang
Dalian Wanda	(China) Chi Shangbin
Guangdong Hongyuan	(China) He Jinlun
Guangzhou Apollo	(China) Xian Dixiong
Guangzhou Songri	(China) Zhang Honggen
Jinan Taishan General	(China) Yin Tiesheng
Shanghai Shenhua	(China) Xu Genbao
Shenzhen Feiyada	(China) Liu Jianjiang
Sichuan Quanxing	
Tianjin Samsung	(China) Zuo Shusheng
Yanbian Hyundai	(China) Li Huen

== Foreign players ==
As a military-owned team, August 1st were not allowed to sign any foreign players.

Club	Player 1	Player 2	Player 3	Former players
Beijing Guoan	(Brazil) Deno Araujo	(Russia) Roman Ignatov		
Dalian Wanda	(Netherlands) Ignacio Tuhuteru	(Sweden) Magnus Sköldmark	(Sweden) Pelle Blohm	(Russia) Valeriy Fedorov (Sweden) Patrik Svensson
Guangdong Hongyuan	(Federal Republic of Yugoslavia) Marko Pima	(Japan) Yoshio Kitajima	(Russia) Vladimir Nakhratov	(Cape Verde) Daniel
Guangzhou Apollo	(Brazil) Emerson Varela			(Federal Republic of Yugoslavia) Vojislav Gligorijević
Guangzhou Songri	(Federal Republic of Yugoslavia) Vladan Radosavljević	(Nigeria) Hilary Azodo		
Jinan Taishan General				
Shanghai Shenhua	(France) Christian Perez	(France) José Bray	(Russia) Vladislav Baskov	(Belarus) Dzmitry Trosko (France) Clément Garcia (Georgia (country)) Gocha Jorjoliani (Russia) Mikhail Trofimov
Shenzhen Feiyada	(Federal Republic of Yugoslavia) Goran Petković	(Federal Republic of Yugoslavia) Slobodan Marović	(Russia) Sergei Markin	(Federal Republic of Yugoslavia) Dejan Vukajlović (Federal Republic of Yugoslavia) Dragan Radovanović (Federal Republic of Yugoslavia) Saša Stanković
Sichuan Quanxing	(Brazil) Fabiano	(Brazil) Marcelo Marmelo	(Russia) Ruslan Lyashchuk	(Russia) Dmitri Gulenkov
Tianjin Samsung	(Brazil) Carlos Roberto	(Brazil) Ronaldo	(Russia) Ildar Aliev	(Russia) Vyacheslav Karpeev (Ukraine) Andriy Payos
Yanbian Hyundai	(Belarus) Dzmitry Barazna	(Russia) Vladislav Zverev	(South Korea) Lee Jun-tae	

== League standings ==
Pos	Team	Pld	W	D	L	GF	GA	GD	Pts	Qualification or relegation
1	Dalian Wanda	22	12	10	0	42	18	+24	46	1997–98 Asian Club Championship qualification
2	Shanghai Shenhua	22	10	9	3	38	18	+20	39	
3	August 1st	22	8	11	3	28	19	+9	35	
4	Beijing Guoan	22	9	6	7	30	25	+5	33	
5	Jinan Taishan General	22	8	7	7	23	24	−1	31	
6	Sichuan Quanxing	22	7	9	6	22	23	−1	30	
7	Guangzhou Apollo	22	7	8	7	26	25	+1	29	
8	Tianjin Samsung	22	6	8	8	20	30	−10	26	
9	Guangdong Hongyuan	22	5	10	7	20	25	−5	25	
10	Yanbian Hyundai	22	4	8	10	20	30	−10	20	
11	Shenzhen Feiyada	22	3	7	12	13	29	−16	16	Relegated to Jia-B League
12	Guangzhou Songri	22	2	9	11	10	26	−16	15	Relegated to Jia-B League

Source: rsssf.com

== Awards ==
Player of the year (Golden Ball Award)

- Su Maozhen (Jinan Taishan General)

Top scorer (Golden Boot Award)

- Su Maozhen (Jinan Taishan General)

Manager of the year

- Chi Shangbin (Dalian Wanda)

Best Referee

- Lu Jun

CFA Team of the Year

Goalkeeper: Han Wenhai (Dalian Wanda)
Defence: Wei Qun (Sichuan Quanxing), Xu Hong (Dalian Wanda), Zhang Enhua (Dalian Wanda), Wu Chengying (Shanghai Shenhua)
Midfield: Peng Weiguo (Guangzhou Songri), Fan Zhiyi (Shanghai Shenhua), Ma Mingyu (Guangdong Hongyuan), Cao Xiandong (Beijing Guoan)
Attack: Hao Haidong (August 1st), Gao Feng (Beijing Guoan),

== See also ==
- Chinese Jia-A League
- Chinese Super League
- Chinese Football Association Jia League
- Chinese Football Association Yi League
- Chinese FA Cup
- Chinese Football Association
- Football in China
- List of football records in China
- Chinese clubs in the AFC Champions League
