= Markin (disambiguation) =

Markin is a village in Iran.

Markin or Markina may also refer to:

- Markin (surname)
- Markin Family Student Recreation Center in Illinois, United States
- Markina-Xemein, a town and municipality in the Basque Autonomous Community
- 1980 Markina attack near Markina-Xemein
- Markin (cloth), a type of salu cloth
