= Baskov =

Baskov (Russian: Басков or Баськов) is a Russian masculine surname, its feminine counterpart is Baskova. It may refer to:

- Nikolay Baskov (born 1976), Russian singer
- Roman Baskov (born 1978), Russian football player
- Svetlana Baskova (born 1965), Russian film director, scenarist and painter
- Vladislav Baskov (born 1975), Russian football midfielder
