= Sergei Markin =

Sergei Markin (Russian: Сергей Маркин) is a Russian masculine name and surname; it may refer to:

- Sergei Markin (artist) (1903–1942), Russian and Soviet artist from Moscow
- Sergei Markin (footballer) (born 1966), Russian football coach and a former player
