= Svetlana S. Markina =

Soviet and Russian epidemiologist

- Светлана Сергеевна Маркина
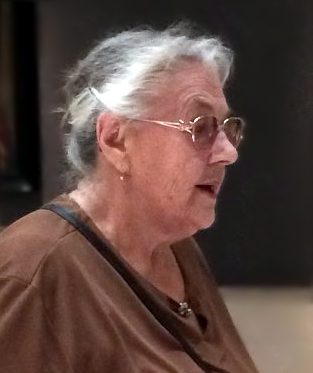
- Markina in 2018
- Born: 3 September 1936; Moscow, Soviet Union
- Died: 10 January 2020 (aged 83); Moscow, Russia
- Education: First Moscow State Medical University
- Scientific career
- Fields: Epidemiology of diphtheria
- Workplaces: Gabrichevsky Institute of Epidemiology and Microbiology

Svetlana Sergeyevna Markina (Russian: Светлана Сергеевна Маркина; 3 September 1936 - 10 January 2020) was a Soviet and Russian epidemiologist. She spent more than five decades at the Gabrichevsky Institute of Epidemiology and Microbiology in Moscow studying diphtheria, helped shape the country's diphtheria surveillance system, and led a 2000 paper in the Journal of Infectious Diseases that became one of the standard accounts of the Russian diphtheria epidemic of the 1990s.

== Biography ==
Markina was born in Moscow on 3 September 1936. Her father, the painter Sergei Markin, died of wounds during the Battle of Moscow when she was five. She studied medicine at what is now the First Moscow State Medical University and joined the Gabrichevsky Institute in 1963, staying there until 2016.

In the late 1960s and early 1970s she worked out a phage typing scheme for Corynebacterium diphtheriae biotype gravis that let researchers tell strains apart and follow chains of transmission in outbreaks. Her 1971 candidate's dissertation came out of that work, and in 1990 she was named co-inventor on a Soviet patent for detecting toxigenic C. diphtheriae.

When diphtheria came back across the former Soviet Union from 1990, Markina was among those at the Gabrichevsky Institute handling the response, working with the Russian sanitary service and the U.S. Centers for Disease Control and Prevention (CDC). She co-authored the CDC's 1998 review of the epidemic in Emerging Infectious Diseases and a 1999 study of three Russian regions in the European Journal of Epidemiology. The 2000 Journal of Infectious Diseases paper she led counted over 115,000 cases and more than 3,000 deaths between 1990 and 1997, and showed that - unusually for diphtheria - most patients were adults rather than children. She kept publishing on diphtheria surveillance and vaccine coverage in Russia into the 2010s.

Markina also served as a deputy of the Moscow City Soviet. She died in Moscow on 10 January 2020, aged 83.
