= Markin (surname) =

Markin is a surname. In Slavic countries it is used only for males, while its feminine counterpart is Markina. It may refer to:

- Aleksandr Markin (footballer) (1949–1996), Soviet Russian football player
- Aleksandr Markin (hurdler) (born 1962), Soviet Russian track and field athlete
- Allan Markin (born 1945), Canadian businessman and philanthropist
- Boris Markin, Ukrainian sprint canoer
- Evgeny Markin (born 1975), Russian businessman, public figure and politician
- Joseph Markin, Canadian lawyer and politician
- Mariya Markina, Russian model
- Mikhail Markin (born 1993), Russian football striker
- Morris Markin (1893–1970), Russian-born American businessman
- Murray Markin (born c. 1949), Canadian politician
- Nadezhda Markina (born 1959), Russian film actress
- Rod Markin (born 1956), American laboratory automation pioneer
- Sergei Vladimirovich Markin (born 1966), Russian football coach and a former player.
- Valentin Markin (1903–1934), Soviet spy
- Viktor Markin (born 1957), Russian sprinter
