= Barazna =

Barazna or Borozna (Belarusian: Баразна, Russian: Борозна) is a gender-neutral Belarusian surname that may refer to

- Dzmitry Barazna (born 1973), Belarusian football player
- Katsiaryna Barazna (born 1990), Belarusian track cyclist
