= Bradley University =

Private university in Peoria, Illinois, U.S.

- Former name: Bradley Polytechnic Institute (1897–1946)
- Type: Private university
- Established: 1897; 129 years ago
- Accreditation: HLC
- Academic affiliations: Space-grant
- Endowment: $394.25 million (2025)
- President: James Shadid
- Provost: Dr. Dan Moon
- Faculty: 389
- Students: 5,217 (fall 2023)
- Undergraduates: 3,883 (fall 2023)
- Postgraduates: 1,334 (fall 2023)
- Location: Peoria, Illinois, United States; 40°41′53″N 89°37′01″W
- Campus: Urban, 84 acres (34 ha)
- Colors: Red & white
- Nickname: Braves
- Sporting affiliations: NCAA Division I – MVC
- Mascot: "Kaboom!" the gargoyle
- Website: www.bradley.edu

Bradley University is a private university in Peoria, Illinois, United States. Founded in 1897, Bradley University enrolls 5,200 students who are pursuing degrees in more than 100 undergraduate programs and more than 30 graduate programs in five colleges. The university is accredited by the Higher Learning Commission and 22 specialized and professional accreditors.

== History ==
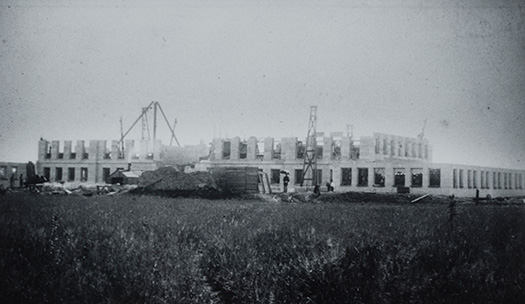
Westlake Hall under construction c. 1897.

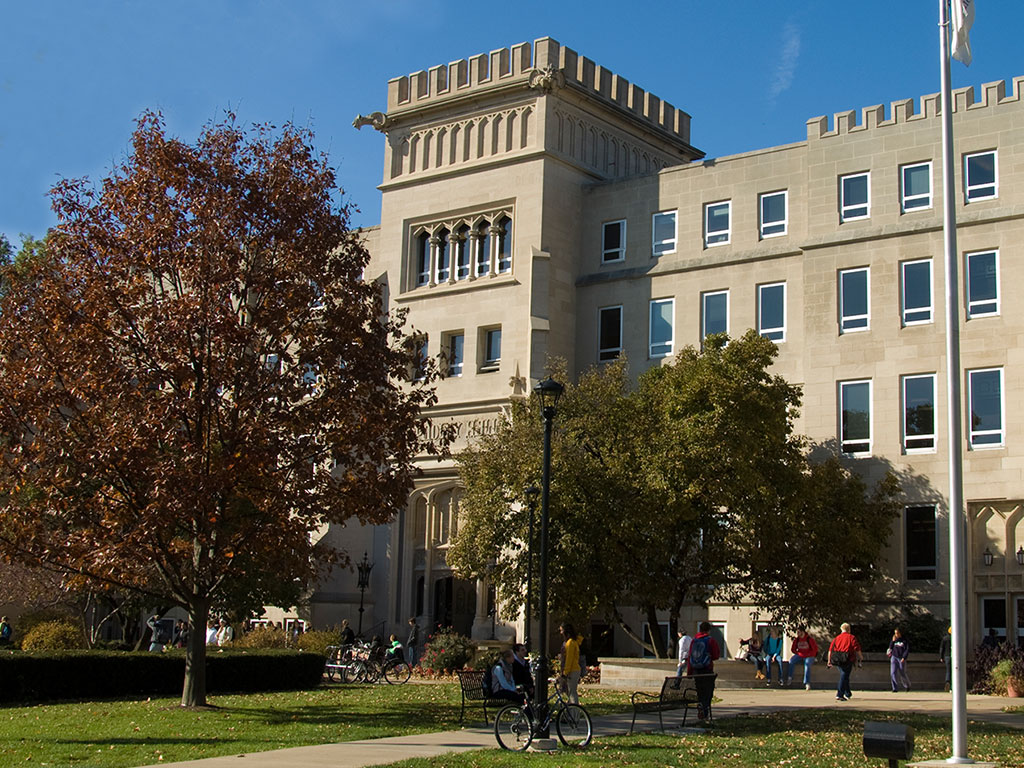
Bradley Hall is one of the first buildings constructed for the university and bears the name of the university's founder.

The Bradley Polytechnic Institute was founded by philanthropist Lydia Moss Bradley in 1897 in memory of her husband, Tobias, and their six children, all of whom died before Bradley, leaving her a childless widow. As a first step toward her goal, in 1892 she purchased a controlling interest in Parsons Horological School in LaPorte, Indiana, the first school for watchmakers in America and moved it to Peoria. She specified in her will that the school should be expanded after her death to include a classical education as well as industrial arts and home economics.

In October 1896, Mrs. Bradley was introduced to William Rainey Harper, president of the University of Chicago. He convinced her to move ahead with her plans and establish the school during her lifetime. Bradley Polytechnic Institute was chartered on November 13, 1896. Mrs. Bradley provided 17.5 acres (71,000 m^{2}) of land, $170,000 for buildings, equipment, and a library, and $30,000 per year for operating expenses. Harper served as president of both institutions (Chicago and Bradley) for some years.

Fourteen faculty and 150 students began classes in Bradley Hall on October 4, 1897 with construction workers still onsite. The Horological Department added another eight faculty and 70 students. Bradley Polytechnic Institute was formally dedicated on October 8, 1897. Its first graduate, in June 1898, was Cora Unland.

Originally, the institute was organized as a four-year academy as well as a two-year college. By 1899 the institute had expanded to accommodate nearly 500 pupils, and study fields included biology, chemistry, food work, sewing, English, German, French, Latin, Greek, history, manual arts, drawing, mathematics, and physics. By 1920 the institute dropped the academy orientation and adopted a four-year collegial program. Enrollment continued to grow over the coming decades and the name Bradley University was adopted in 1946.

The first music building on Bradley's campus, Constance Hall, was built in 1930. In 1962 the building was renovated to become the music building of Bradley's Campus.

== Campus ==
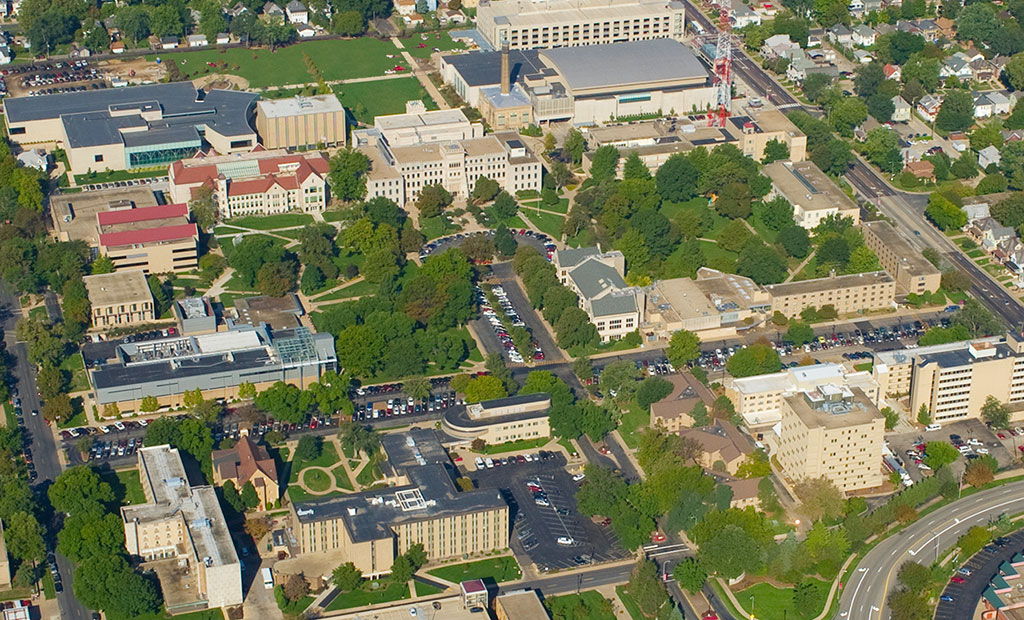
Bradley's 84 acre campus on Peoria's west bluff.

Bradley's 84-acre (34 ha) campus is located on Peoria's west bluff and is minutes from downtown. The campus of Bradley University is relatively compact.

=== Student housing ===
Bradley's student housing is concentrated on the campus's east side; there are several residence halls and university-owned apartment complexes.

=== Other buildings and facilities ===
Located on the south side of Bradley's campus is Dingeldine Music Center.

Bradley University is also the site of Peoria's National Public Radio affiliate, WCBU-FM. The radio tower is a prominent landmark and is located adjacent to the BECC, at the site of the former Jobst Hall.

Bradley sports two athletic facilities directly on campus. The Markin Family Student Recreation Center, completed in 2008, houses a variety of sports and fitness areas. Renaissance Coliseum is home to Bradley women's basketball, as well as other sporting and non-sporting events.

=== Westlake Hall renovation ===
Built in 1897, Westlake Hall is the oldest building on campus and has been utilized as a learning facility for over 100 years. This building is home to Bradley's College of Education and Health Sciences. In March 2010, this building underwent a $24 million renovation was completed in June 2012. This renovation increased the building to four stories tall, consisting of academic classrooms and offices. The building was expanded from 13,500 square feet to 84,500 square feet, six times its original size. The building's signature clock tower and limestone was incorporated into the renovation.

== Academics ==
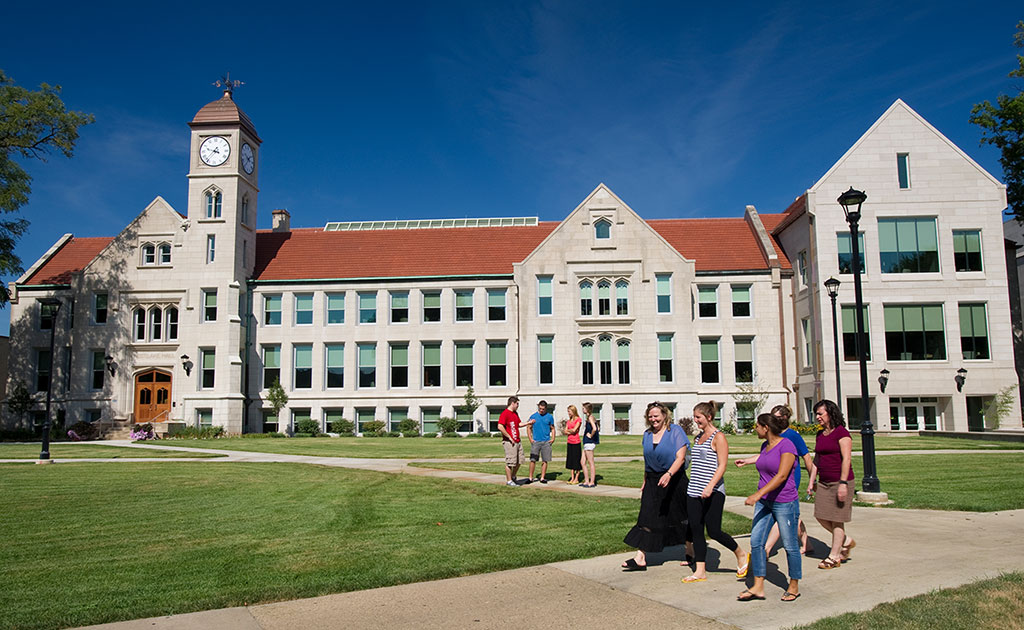
Westlake Hall was renovated and expanded to six times its original size.

Bradley University is organized into the following colleges and schools:

- College of Education and Health Sciences
- Caterpillar College of Engineering and Technology
- College of Liberal Arts and Sciences
- Foster College of Business
- Slane College of Communications and Fine Arts
- Turner School of Entrepreneurship and Innovation

Students without a declared major may also be admitted to the Academic Exploration Program (AEP).

Bradley University is among the first universities in the nation to have a school of entrepreneurship and the first established as a freestanding academic unit. The Turner School of Entrepreneurship and Innovation is named in honor of Bob and Carolyn Turner, long-time supporters of Bradley. The Turners established the Robert and Carolyn Turner Center for Entrepreneurship in 2002. Gerald Hills, the school's founding academic executive director, received the Karl Vesper Entrepreneurship Pioneer Award in 2012 and the Babson Lifetime Award in 2011. Hills served as the Turner Chair of Entrepreneurship until he retired in December 2014.

The Bradley University Department of Teacher Education and College of Education and Health Sciences is NCATE-approved. Bradley University's Foster College of Business is accredited by AACSB International for both business and accounting programs.

Bradley University's Caterpillar College of Engineering and Technology maintains ABET accreditations for all four of its engineering programs (Mechanical, Electrical, Civil, and Industrial/Manufacturing).

The university is also home to the Charley Steiner School of Sports Communication, the first such named school in the U.S. Bradley University offers Masters level graduate degrees in business, communication and fine arts, education and health sciences, engineering, and liberal arts and sciences. The program of physical therapy offers a Doctor of Physical Therapy degree.

=== Tuition and financial aid ===
As of the 2022–2023 school year, students who are enrolled full-time at Bradley University pay $39,248 for tuition. Students living in the residence halls on campus pay an additional $12,850 for room and board, along with a $432 activity and health fee. The total cost for full-time students living on campus is $52,530. Financial assistance awards are typically received by more than 85% of the university's students.

=== Rankings ===
Academic rankings

National
- Forbes: 230
- U.S. News & World Report: 189
- Washington Monthly: 264

In its 2025 rankings, U.S. News & World Report ranked the university's undergraduate program 189th (tied) among 436 national universities.

In 2009, Bradley's International Trade Center was awarded the President's "E" Award for U.S. exporters. Only 21 awards were given nationally and Bradley's ITC was the only trade center in the country to be recognized. Bradley was ranked sixth nationally among universities of its kind for producing Fulbright students in 2013–2014.

== Student life ==
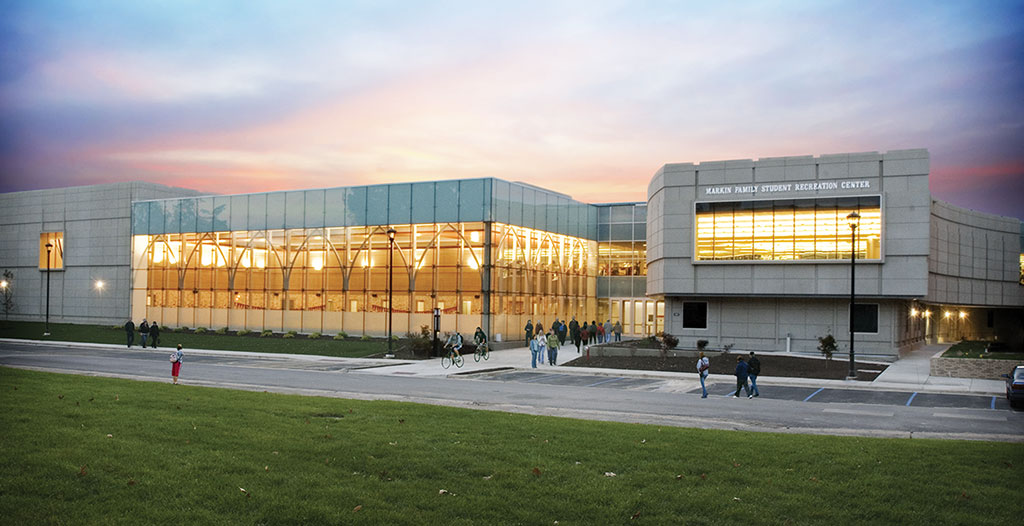
Markin Family Student Recreation Center

=== Student organizations ===
The speech team had a winning streak at the American Forensics Association Championship from 1980 through 1993.

Bradley University is home to the most successful sales team in the nation. Bradley defeated 66 other colleges to win their nation-leading third National Collegiate Sales Competition (NCSC) championship on March 7, 2022, also becoming the first-ever back-to-back national champion.

=== Greek life ===
There are several fraternities and sororities on and off campus. In 2003, Bradley University student and member of the Phi Kappa Tau fraternity, Robert Schmalz (age 22), died after drinking excessive amounts of alcohol continuously over several days. His death stood in particularly stark contrast to the award that Bradley administrators had accepted in Washington, DC that same month, in recognition of the university's alcohol and drug abuse prevention programs, which was portrayed to the nation as being exemplary.

=== Media ===
The annual student literary journal is called Broadside. The student-run weekly newspaper is called The Scout.

== Athletics ==
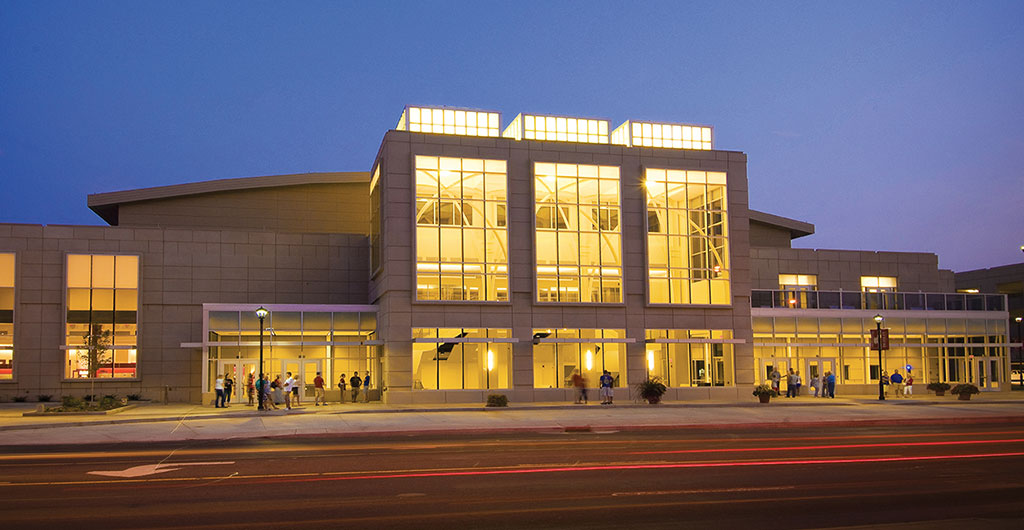
Renaissance Coliseum

Bradley University is a member of the Missouri Valley Conference. Conference-approved sports at Bradley for men are baseball, basketball, cross-country running, golf, indoor and outdoor track, and soccer. Women's sports consist of basketball, cross-country running, golf, indoor and outdoor track, softball, tennis, and volleyball. As of the spring semester of 2024, Bradley University's Esports teams also joined the conference to compete in Overwatch 2 and Rocket League.

The men's basketball team has appeared nine times in the NCAA Tournament: 1950, 1954, 1955, 1980, 1986, 1988, 1996, 2006, and 2019 and would have appeared in the 2020 NCAA tournament as the MVC Tournament Champions. In 1950 and 1954 they were national runners-up in the Final Four, and in 2006 the Braves made their first Sweet Sixteen appearance since 1955, defeating 4th seed Kansas and 5th seed Pittsburgh. Bradley's run came to an end in the Sweet Sixteen with a loss to the University of Memphis. Bradley also won the National Invitation Tournament in 1957, 1960, 1964, and 1982. In 2008, the men's basketball team was selected to participate in the inaugural College Basketball Invitational. They defeated Cincinnati and Virginia en route to the Championship but lost to Tulsa 2–1 in a 3-game series.

Bradley baseball advanced to the College World Series in 1950 and 1956. In 1956, the team qualified for the Final Four, falling to eventual champion Minnesota in the semifinals. In 2015, the Bradley baseball team received an at-large bid to the NCAA postseason baseball tournament, the school's first appearance since 1968. After finishing the regular season with a record of 32–18, the Braves advanced to the Missouri Valley Conference tournament championship game by defeating Evansville, Indiana State, and #11 nationally ranked Dallas Baptist and were ultimately defeated by #8 nationally ranked Missouri State 5–2. After finishing the season with the #19 RPI in the nation and a record of 35–19, the Braves were placed in the Louisville regional as the #2 seed, along with #3 seeded Michigan, #4 seeded Morehead State, and the number one seed host Louisville. Video taken at the team's selection show viewing party shows the team excitement when they learned they would be participating in the NCAA tournament. When the Braves earned a 9–4 victory over Morehead State, they snapped a streak of 9 straight losses in NCAA postseason play dating back to the third round of the College World Series in 1956 when they defeated Wyoming 12–8.

In the Missouri Valley Conference Esports league, Bradley competes in Overwatch 2 and Rocket League. In 2024, Bradley's Overwatch 2 team secured 2nd place in the conference, behind Illinois State University, after competing in an in-person tournament at Illinois State's Esports facility. At the same event, Bradley's Rocket League team lost to Southern Illinois University Carbondale in the semi-finals.

The university does not have a football team. The football program was disbanded in 1970.

== Notable people ==
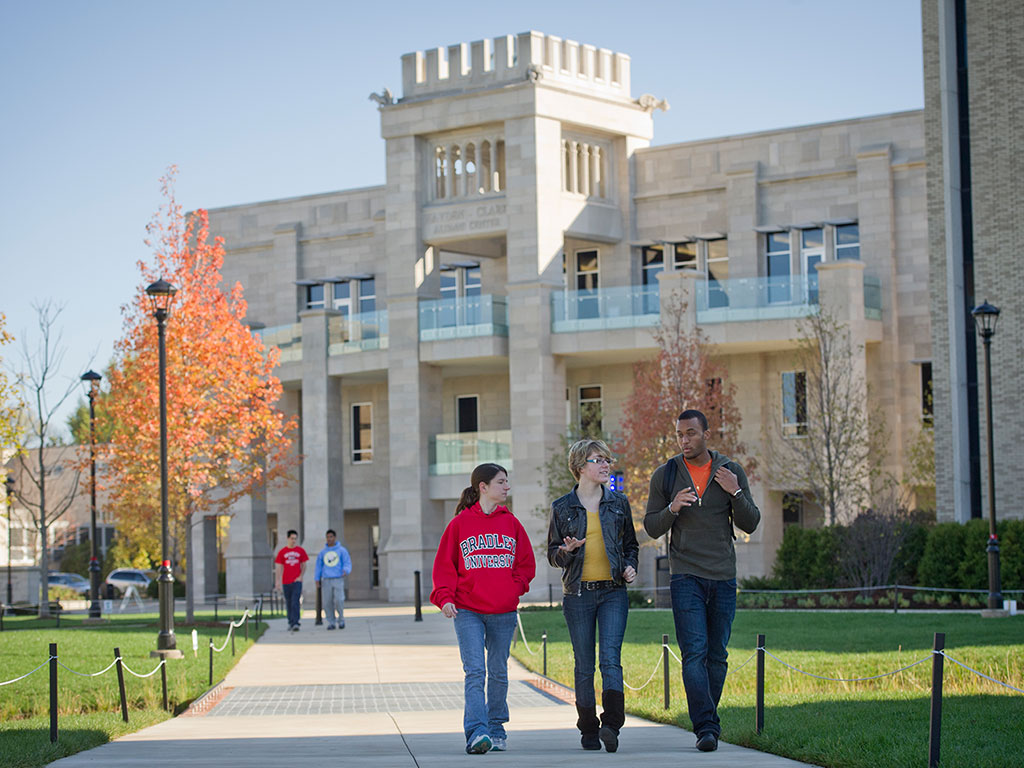
Hayden-Clark Alumni Center

== See also ==
- Carver Arena – home court of Bradley men's basketball games
