= Ruslan Lyashchuk =

Russian footballer

Personal information
- Full name: Ruslan Mikhailovich Lyashchuk
- Date of birth: 21 November 1974 (age 51)
- Height: 1.78 m (5 ft 10 in)
- Position: Goalkeeper

Senior career*
| Years | Team | Apps | (Gls) |
| 1991–1993 | FC Rostselmash Rostov-on-Don | 1 | (0) |
| 1992–1993 | → FC Rostselmash-2 Rostov-on-Don (loans) | 28 | (0) |
| 1993 | FC APK Azov | 18 | (0) |
| 1994–1995 | FC Chernomorets Novorossiysk | 17 | (0) |
| 1996 | FC SKA Rostov-on-Don | 1 | (0) |
| 1996 | FC Dynamo-Gazovik-d Tyumen | 11 | (0) |
| 1997–1999 | FC Torpedo-ZIL Moscow | 23 | (0) |
| 2000 | FC Zvezda Irkutsk | 20 | (0) |
| 2001 | FC Dynamo-MGO-Mostransgaz Moscow | | |
| 2002 | FC Pyunik | 2 | (0) |
| 2003 | FC Krylya Sovetov Moscow (amateur) | | |
| 2006–2008 | FC Korston Moscow | | |
- * Club domestic league appearances and goals

Ruslan Mikhailovich Lyashchuk (Russian: Руслан Михайлович Лящук; born 21 November 1974) is a former Russian football player.

== Honours ==
Pyunik

- Armenian Premier League champion: 2002
- Armenian Independence Cup winner: 2002
