= Evgeny Markin =

Russian businessman and politician (born 1975)

- Born: 20 January 1975 (age 51); USSR
- Education: Diplomatic Academy of the Ministry of Foreign Affairs of the Russian Federation in Moscow, Russia
- Occupations: Businessman, public figure and politician. Executive Director of the Russian-Chinese Business Council.

Evgeny L. Markin (in Russian: Евгений Леонидович Маркин; born in 1975), is a Russian businessman, public figure and politician. Currently serves as the Executive Director of the Russian-Chinese Business Council.

== Education ==
Graduated from school with advanced study of Chinese in Vladivostok. In 1997 Markin finished Far Eastern State Academy of Economics and Management with a degree in economics. In 2010 he graduated from Diplomatic Academy of Ministry of Foreign Affairs.

== Business career ==
- From 1995 until 1998 worked in leading travel companies(Bureau of International Youth Tourism "Sputnik", Travel Business Club "Olga"). Evgeny Markin was a specialist in the direction of outbound tourism in Southeast Asia.
- From 1998 until 2001 worked in travel agency “Westminster” (Hong Kong).
- From 2001 until 2006 Markin led the company «Bysiness Symbol», which provided consulting services in GR in South-East Asia for Russian entrepreneurs.
- Since 2013 he has worked in LLC “Stroygazmontazh” as Advisor to General Director on cooperation with Asia-Pacific countries

== Public and political career ==
- From December 2006 to April 2008 Evgeny Markin worked in the Administration of Primorsky Territory, held an office as:
  - Deputy Head of the representative office of the Primorsky Territory Administration under the Government of the Russian Federation (Moscow);
  - Deputy Director of the International Cooperation and Tourism Department of the Primorsky Territory Administration;
  - Assistant to Governor of the Primorsky Territory Administration;
- From April 2008 until March 2009 he worked in the Ministry of Regional Development of the Russian Federation and held positions, such as:
  - Assistant on the realization of the Olympic objects construction programme;
  - Deputy Head of the Northern Territories Development Section of the Far East and Northern Territories Development Department;
- From June 2010 to August 2012 Markin was the Director of the International Cooperation and Tourism Department of Primorsky Territory in the Administration of Primorsky Territory, Assistant to Governor of the Primorsky Territory Administration.
- In September 2012 he held an office of the Assistant to Minister, Head of the Secretariat in the Ministry of Regional Development.
- Since 2020, Evgeny Markin has been the Executive Director of the Russian-Chinese Business Council.
- Evgeny Markin is one of the founders of "Voskresenie" Russian Cultural Association, established by the initiative of the nationals, who are living in the southern China, for the performance of public activities and development of national and cultural relations between Russia and China.
- Markin Evgeny is the Adviser to Secretary of Patriarchal Council on Culture for cooperation with PRC Archimandrite Tikhon (Shevkunov)

== Hobbies and interests ==
Speaks fluent Chinese and English. Married, has daughter and son.
