= Markin Family Student Recreation Center =

Sports center at Bradley University in Peoria, Illinois

- Markin Center
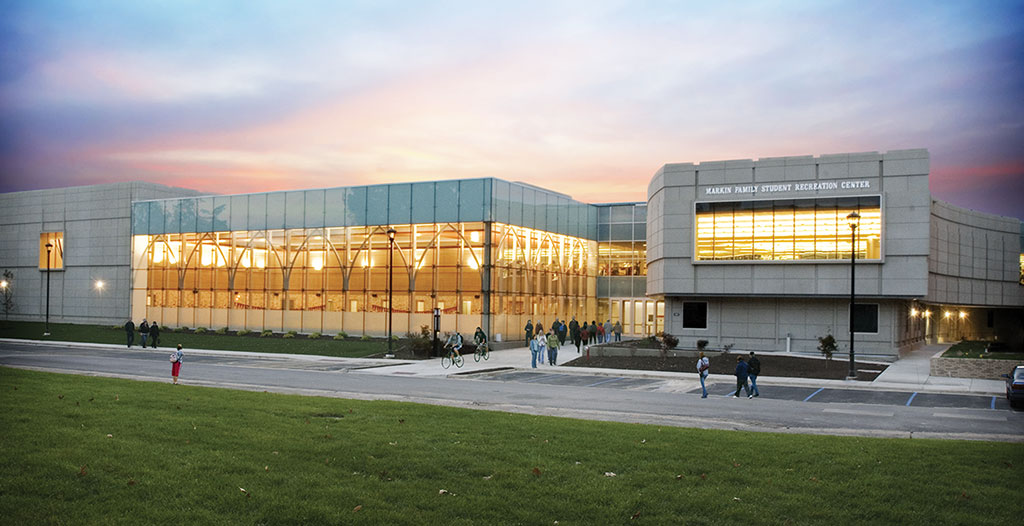
- Interactive map of Markin Family Student Recreation Center
- Full name: Markin Family Student Recreation Center
- Location: Peoria, Illinois
- Coordinates: 40°41′49.6″N 89°37′5″W
- Owner: Bradley University
- Operator: Bradley University
- Public transit: CityLink

Construction
- Groundbreaking: 2008
- Opened: 2008
- Cost: $25 million ($37.4 million in 2025 dollars)

Markin Family Student Recreation Center is a multi-purpose student recreational facility constructed in 2008 at Bradley University in Peoria, Illinois.

After the demolition of Robertson Memorial Field House, the Markin Center's intramural championship gym served as the temporary home for the Bradley University women's volleyball program while construction continued on Renaissance Coliseum, a 4,200 seat on-campus arena that will serves as home to both women's basketball and volleyball.
