= Goran Petković =

Serbian footballer

Personal information
- Full name: Goran Damjan Petković
- Date of birth: March 5, 1975 (age 51)
- Place of birth: Belgrade, SFR Yugoslavia
- Height: 1.79 m (5 ft 10 in)
- Position: Midfielder

Senior career*
Years	Team	Apps	(Gls)
1998–1999	Zemun	1	(0)
1999–2007	Kallithea	168	(12)
2007–2008	Agios Dimitrios		
2008–2009	BASK	10	(1)
2008–2013	Beograd	38	(11)
- * Club domestic league appearances and goals

Goran Petković (Serbian Cyrillic: Горан Петковић; born 5 March 1975) is a Serbian retired football midfielder.

His previous clubs include Zemun, Greek sides Kallithea and Agios Dimitrios, and FK BASK

Petković, with Kallithea played in the Super League Greece.
