= Mikhail Trofimov =

Russian footballer and coach (born 1974)

Personal information
- Full name: Mikhail Aleksandrovich Trofimov
- Date of birth: 5 August 1974 (age 52)
- Place of birth: Baku, Azerbaijani SSR
- Height: 1.82 m (5 ft 11 1/2 in)
- Position: Defender

Senior career*
Years	Team	Apps	(Gls)
1992	FC Zenit St. Petersburg	1	(0)
1992	FC Kosmos-Kirovets St. Petersburg	14	(0)
1993–1994	FC Zenit St. Petersburg	15	(0)
1995	FC Saturn-1991 St. Petersburg	23	(0)
1998–1999	FC Dynamo St. Petersburg	47	(0)
2000–2002	FC Salyut-Energia Belgorod	54	(2)
2003	FC Kaisar	3	(0)
2003–2004	FC Chkalovets-1936 Novosibirsk	28	(0)
2005–2006	FC Volga Nizhny Novgorod	45	(2)
2007	FC Sever Murmansk (amateur)		
2008–2009	FC Sever Murmansk	34	(2)

Managerial career
- 2010–2012: FC Sever Murmansk (assistant)
- * Club domestic league appearances and goals

Mikhail Aleksandrovich Trofimov (Russian: Михаил Александрович Трофимов; born 5 August 1974) is a Russian professional football coach and a former player.

== Club career ==
He made his debut in the Russian Premier League in 1992 for FC Zenit St. Petersburg.
