= Lydia Moss Bradley =

Peoria, Illinois philanthropist; founded Bradley University, Bradley Park

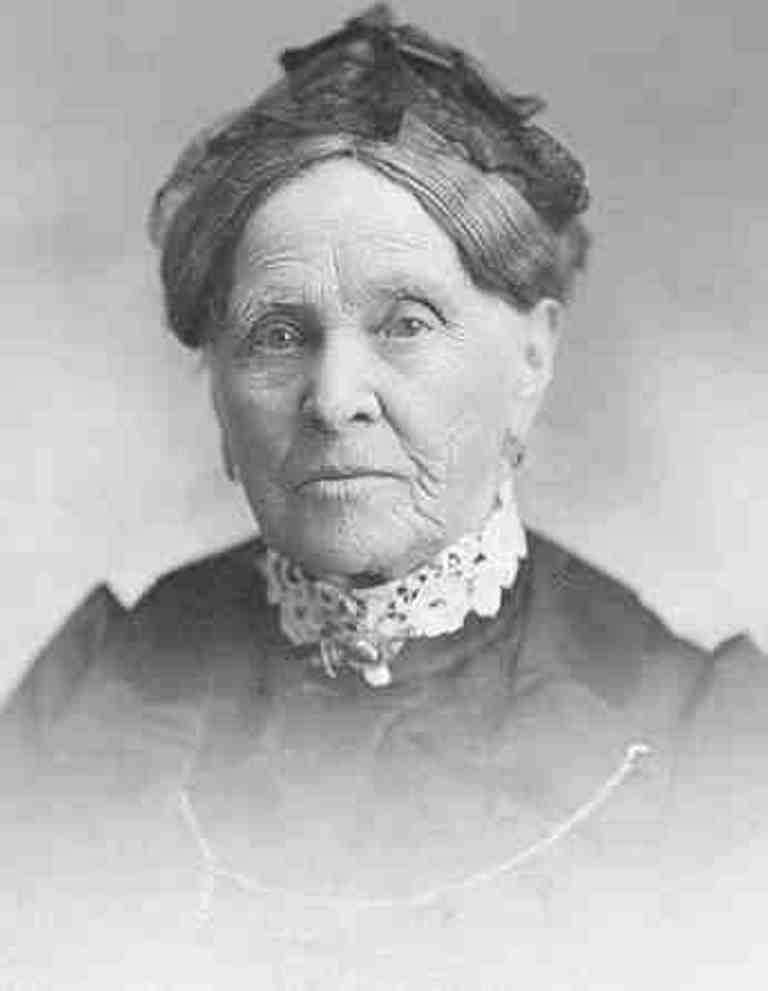
- Born: July 31, 1816; Vevay, Indiana, U.S.
- Died: January 16, 1908 (aged 91); Peoria, Illinois, U.S.
- Occupation: Philanthropist
- Spouse: Tobias S. Bradley (m. 1837; died 1867)
- Children: 6

Lydia Moss Bradley (July 31, 1816 – January 16, 1908) was a wealthy bank president and philanthropist notable for her philanthropic works. She founded Bradley Polytechnic Institute (now known as simply Bradley University) in Peoria, Illinois, in 1897.

== Early life ==
Lydia Moss was born on July 31, 1816, in Vevay, Indiana, alongside the Ohio River. She was a daughter of Loudoun County, Virginia, native Zealy Moss and a granddaughter of Revolutionary War chaplain Nathaniel Moss. Her mother was Fauquier County, Virginia, native Jeanette (Glasscock) Moss.

According to her National Women's Hall of Fame biographical sketch, Lydia Moss "grew up on the frontier" and was "educated in a log home." In fact, she lived in Vevay with her family until she wed Tobias S. Bradley on May 11, 1837. At the age of 31, she and her husband then moved to Peoria, Illinois. Over the next three decades they prospered in real estate and banking. Despite her husband's death in 1867 and the prior deaths of all six of their children, Lydia Moss Bradley continued to work in business and pursued philanthropic interests, particularly in the areas of healthcare and education. Under her control, the value of the Bradley estate quadrupled.

== Works ==
Lydia Moss Bradley's philanthropic and civic work transformed Peoria, Illinois, and left a lasting impact on education, healthcare, public parks, and community development. Her most enduring achievement was the founding of Bradley Polytechnic Institute, now Bradley University, which she regarded as the crowning accomplishment of her life.

In 1875, Bradley became the first woman to serve on the board of directors of a national bank in the United States when she joined the First National Bank of Peoria (now Commerce Bank). She was also among the first American women to execute a marriage contract, or prenuptial agreement, to protect her personal assets before marrying Edward Clark in 1869. The couple divorced in 1873.

Bradley was a prominent benefactor in Peoria. She donated land to the Society of St. Francis for the construction of what became OSF St. Francis Medical Center, established the Bradley Home for Aged Women in 1884 to provide housing for widowed and childless women, and financed the construction of Peoria's Universalist church. In 1903, she successfully defended her property interests in a landmark land dispute that reached the U.S. Supreme Court.

She also played a central role in the creation of Illinois' first park district. Beginning in 1881, Bradley donated more than 30 acres to the City of Peoria in memory of her daughter, Laura Bradley, for use as a public park. When the land remained undeveloped, she pledged an additional 100 acres if the city established a formal park district. Her offer led to the creation of the Pleasure Driveway and Park District of Peoria in 1894. Bradley's deed required that the parks prohibit alcohol sales, gambling, disorderly conduct, and other activities she believed were inconsistent with their public purpose.

== Bradley University (Bradley Polytechnic Institute) ==
Bradley's most significant legacy was the establishment of Bradley Polytechnic Institute (now Bradley University), founded in 1896 as a memorial to her husband, Tobias Bradley, and their six children, all of whom died before adulthood. Believing that education offered the greatest opportunity to improve society, she envisioned an institution that would provide students with practical training while also preparing them for productive, independent lives.

As an initial step toward creating the school, Bradley purchased a controlling interest in the Parsons Horological School in LaPorte, Indiana, in 1892. She relocated the watchmaking school, along with its faculty and approximately 100 students, to Peoria. In her will, she directed that the institution eventually expand beyond technical training to include instruction in the liberal arts, industrial arts, and home economics, stating that its purpose was to provide students "with the means of living an independent, industrious and useful life by the aid of a practical knowledge of the useful arts and sciences."

University of Chicago president William Rainey Harper encouraged Bradley to establish the school during her lifetime rather than through her estate. Acting on his advice, she chartered Bradley Polytechnic Institute on November 13, 1896. She donated 17.5 acres of land, provided $170,000 for buildings, equipment, and a library, and committed $30,000 annually for operating expenses. Construction began in April 1897, and the institute opened on October 4, 1897, with 14 faculty members and approximately 150 students.

At the dedication ceremony, Bradley expressed her hope that the institute would "be a real benefit to mankind" by helping educate "better men and women." To ensure the institution remained closely connected to its community, she required that a majority of its governing board consist of Peoria residents, a provision written into the school's charter.

Bradley remained actively involved in the institute throughout her life. She frequently attended campus events, welcomed students to her home, and continued expanding the institution through additional gifts. She ultimately transferred nearly all of her estate—including almost 1,000 properties—to the institute while retaining their income during her lifetime. In 1906, she announced funding for Hewitt Gymnasium, now Hartmann Center for the Performing Arts.

The institution grew steadily after Bradley's death, becoming a four-year college in 1920 and adopting the name Bradley University in 1946 when it began offering graduate degrees. It remains the most enduring expression of Bradley's philanthropic vision and is widely regarded as her greatest contribution to education and the city of Peoria.

== Death and interment ==
According to biographer Allen A. Upton, Lydia Moss Bradley "was confined to her home with illness" in December 1907. Initially diagnosed with internal inflammation, she briefly improved under the care of her physician, but her health then declined once again following a revised diagnosis of "la grippe" in early January 1908. Although in great pain, the now-91-year-old philanthropist reportedly remained alert and engaged with the affairs of her estate. She succumbed to complications from her condition at 7:15 a.m. on January 16, 1908. Following funeral services at her home, she was laid to rest beside her husband at the Springdale Cemetery "in the family plot that held the remains of her father, mother, Laura, the five other children and the children of William Moss."

== Honors ==
In 1997, Bradley University honored Lydia Moss Bradley by erecting a statue on Founder's Circle in her honor. That statue has since been featured regularly in images used for university recruiting brochures. In June 2018, the statue was knocked down during a traffic accident. On August 16, 2018, there was a celebration in honor of the restored statue.

In 1998, Lydia Moss Bradley was inducted into the National Women's Hall of Fame.

== See also ==
- Bradley University
