= Roman Baskov =

Russian footballer and coach

Personal information
- Full name: Roman Nikolayevich Baskov
- Date of birth: 1 April 1978 (age 48)
- Place of birth: Volzhsky, Volgograd Oblast, Russian SFSR
- Height: 1.92 m (6 ft 3 1/2 in)
- Positions: Midfielder; defender

Senior career*
Years	Team	Apps	(Gls)
1996–1997	FC Torpedo Volzhsky	19	(2)
1998	FC Rotor Kamyshin	14	(2)
1998–1999	FC Lada-Grad Dimitrovgrad	17	(2)
2000–2001	FC Balakovo	50	(10)
2002	FC Sibur-Khimik Dzerzhinsk	30	(3)
2003	FC Gazovik Orenburg	38	(5)
2004–2005	FC KAMAZ Naberezhnye Chelny	25	(3)
2005–2007	FC Nosta Novotroitsk	67	(7)
2008	FC Lada Togliatti	33	(3)
2009	FC Energiya Volzhsky	33	(2)
2010	FC Volga Ulyanovsk	19	(0)
2011–2012	FC Energiya Volzhsky	29	(1)

Managerial career
- 2013: FC Energiya Volzhsky (assistant)
- * Club domestic league appearances and goals

Roman Nikolayevich Baskov (Russian: Роман Николаевич Баськов; born 1 April 1978) is a former Russian professional football player and coach.

== Club career ==
He played 7 seasons in the Russian Football National League for 4 different clubs.
