= Roman Ignatov =

Russian footballer

Personal information
- Full name: Roman Gennadyevich Ignatov
- Date of birth: 11 June 1973 (age 53)
- Place of birth: Vyborg, Russian SFSR
- Height: 1.74 m (5 ft 8 1/2 in)
- Positions: Midfielder; defender

Senior career*
Years	Team	Apps	(Gls)
1990–1993	Zeint St. Petersburg	52	(0)
1994–1995	Dynamo St. Petersburg	20	(5)
1996	Beijing Guoan		
1997	Warkaus JK	24	(2)
1999–2004	Kuusankoski	94	(18)

Managerial career
- 2024–: Favorit Vyborg
- * Club domestic league appearances and goals

Roman Gennadyevich Ignatov (Russian: Роман Геннадьевич Игнатов; born 11 June 1973) is a Russian former professional footballer.

Since 2024, he has been coaching FC Favorit Vyborg from the Leningrad Region Championship (D5).
