= Dzmitry Barazna =

Soviet association football player

Personal information
- Full name: Dzmitry Anatolyevich Barazna
- Date of birth: 19 November 1973 (age 52)
- Place of birth: Asipovichy, Belarusian SSR
- Height: 1.97 m (6 ft 5 1/2 in)
- Position: Defender

Senior career*
Years	Team	Apps	(Gls)
1991	Zaria Bălți	6	(0)
1992	Ros Bila Tserkva	11	(0)
1992–1993	Shakhtyor Soligorsk	39	(2)
1994–1996	Torpedo Mogilev	43	(1)
1996	Yanbian	3	(0)
1997	KAMAZ-Chally Naberezhnye Chelny	7	(0)
1997	→ KAMAZ-d Naberezhnye Chelny	11	(2)
1998–1999	Energiya Chaykovsky	12	(0)
2000	Belshina Bobruisk	3	(0)
2001	Svisloch-Krovlya Osipovichi	17	(0)
- * Club domestic league appearances and goals

Dzmitry Anatolyevich Barazna (Belarusian: Дзмітрый Анатольевіч Баразна; Russian: Дмитрий Анатольевич Борозна, Dmitri Anatolyevich Borozna; born 19 November 1973 in Asipovichy) is a former Belarusian football player.

== Honours ==
Torpedo Mogilyov

- Belarusian Cup finalist: 1994/95
