= Sergei Markin (artist) =

Soviet artist from Moscow

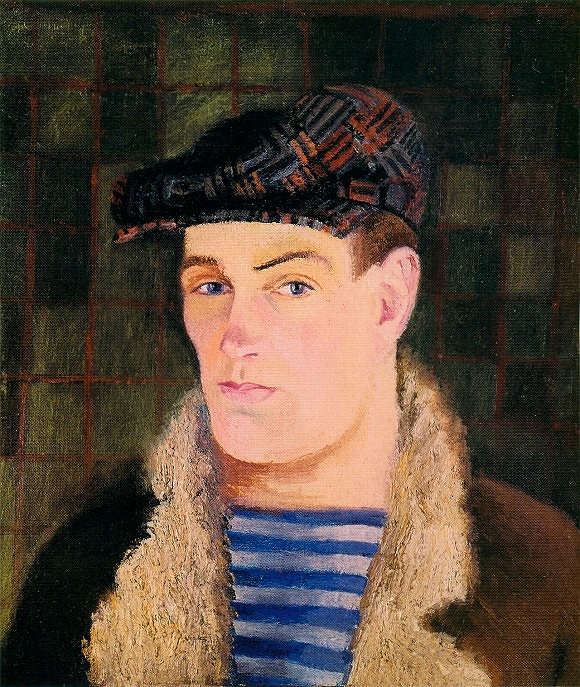
- Born: Sergey Ivanovich Markin; 20 August 1903; Moscow Governorate of Russian Empire
- Died: February, 1942 (38 years old); Moscow Oblast, Soviet Union
- Education: Moscow School of Painting, Sculpture, and Architecture
- Known for: Paintings, exhibitions
- Movement: Modernism

Sergey Ivanovich Markin (Russian: Сергей Иванович Маркин; 1903–1942) — Moscow professional artist, painter and artist-decorator of the TRAM Theater (modern Lenkom). Master of urban landscape and narrative compositions conveying the spirit of the pre-war era. He was a member of the Pleiades of Artists of the 1920s-1930s. He worked in the Moscow Union of Artists (MOSSH). He died in battles near Moscow in the first year of the Great Patriotic War.

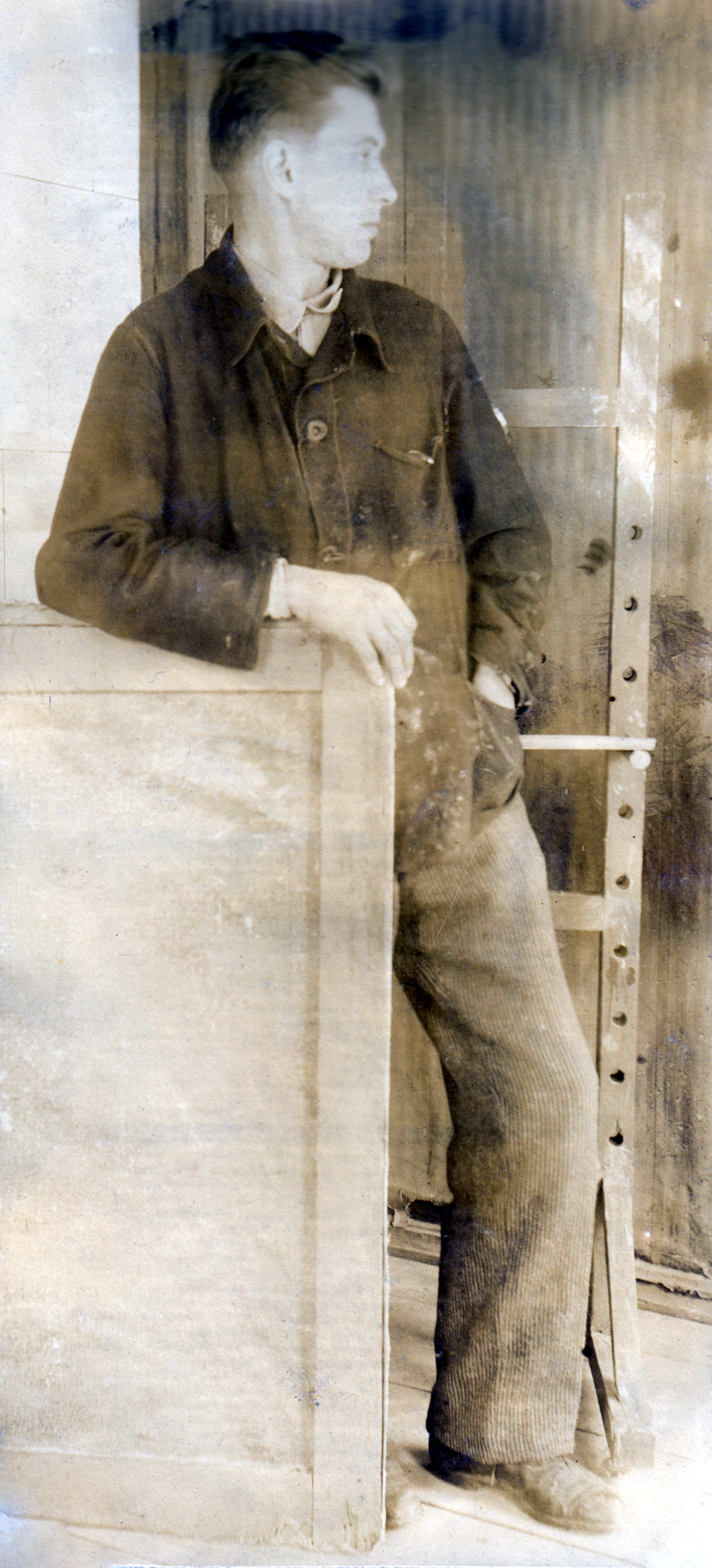
Sergey Markin, Moscow 1931

Sergey Markin, according to the historian of art and art critic Olga Roitenberg, is known for “peacefully-focused” landscapes. Critics noted the originality of his compositional thinking and a heightened sense of time. He is the author of paintings on the themes of the history of revolution and civil war, genre paintings, portraits, landscapes. He took part in the design of Moscow for the revolutionary holidays.

== Gallery ==
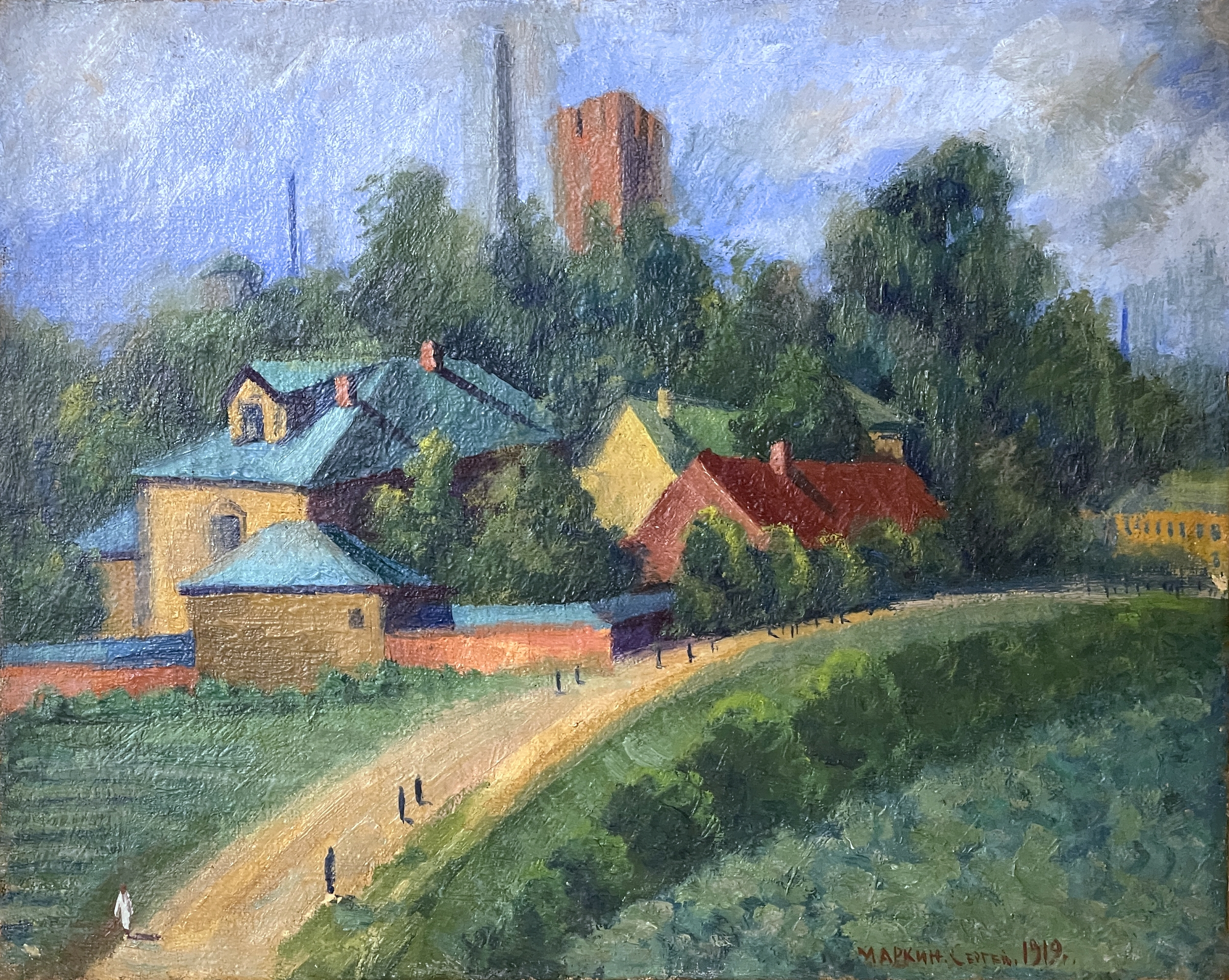
Moscow, 1919

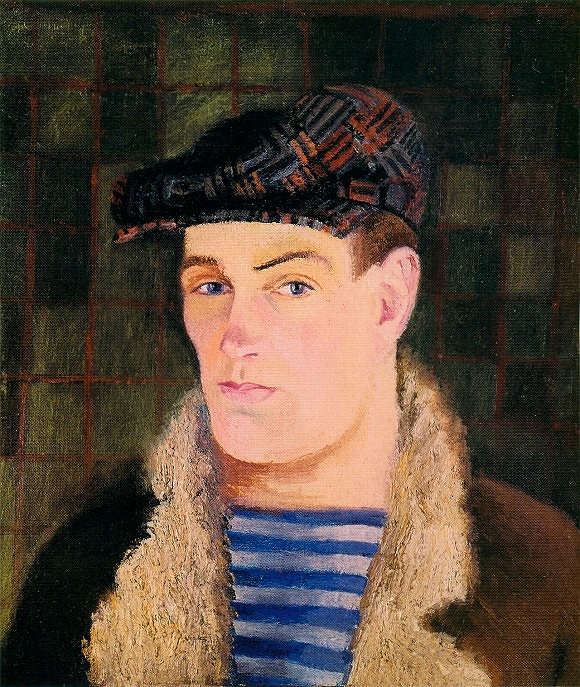
Self portrait, 1925

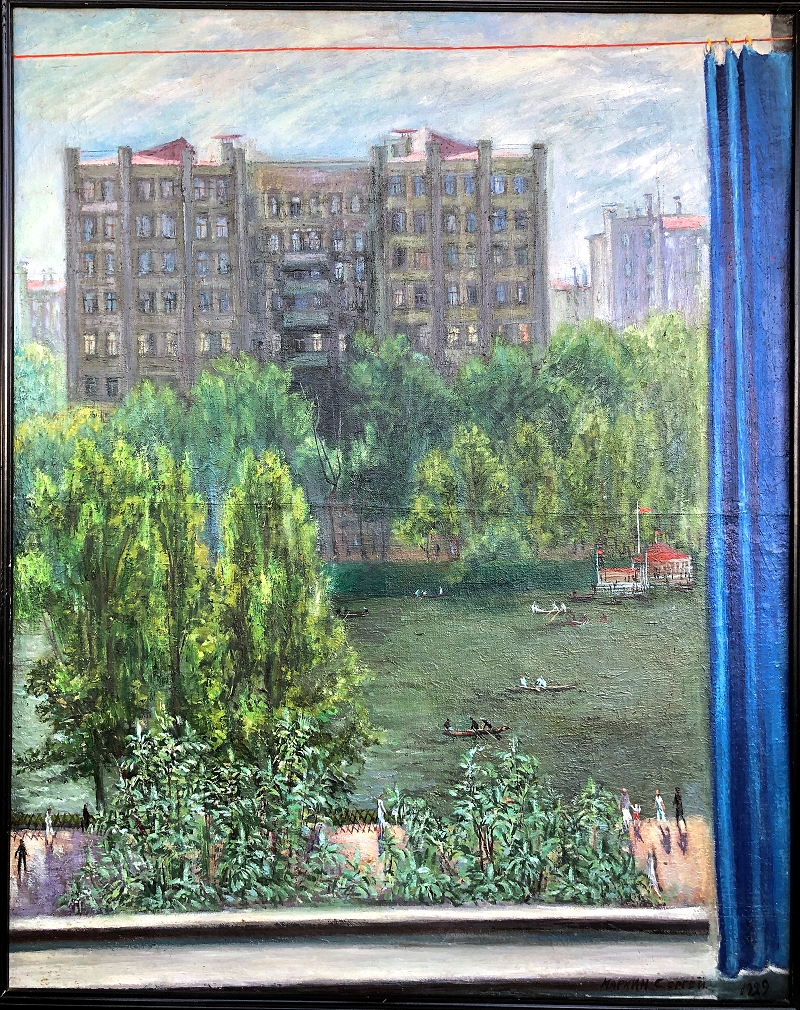
Window view, 1929

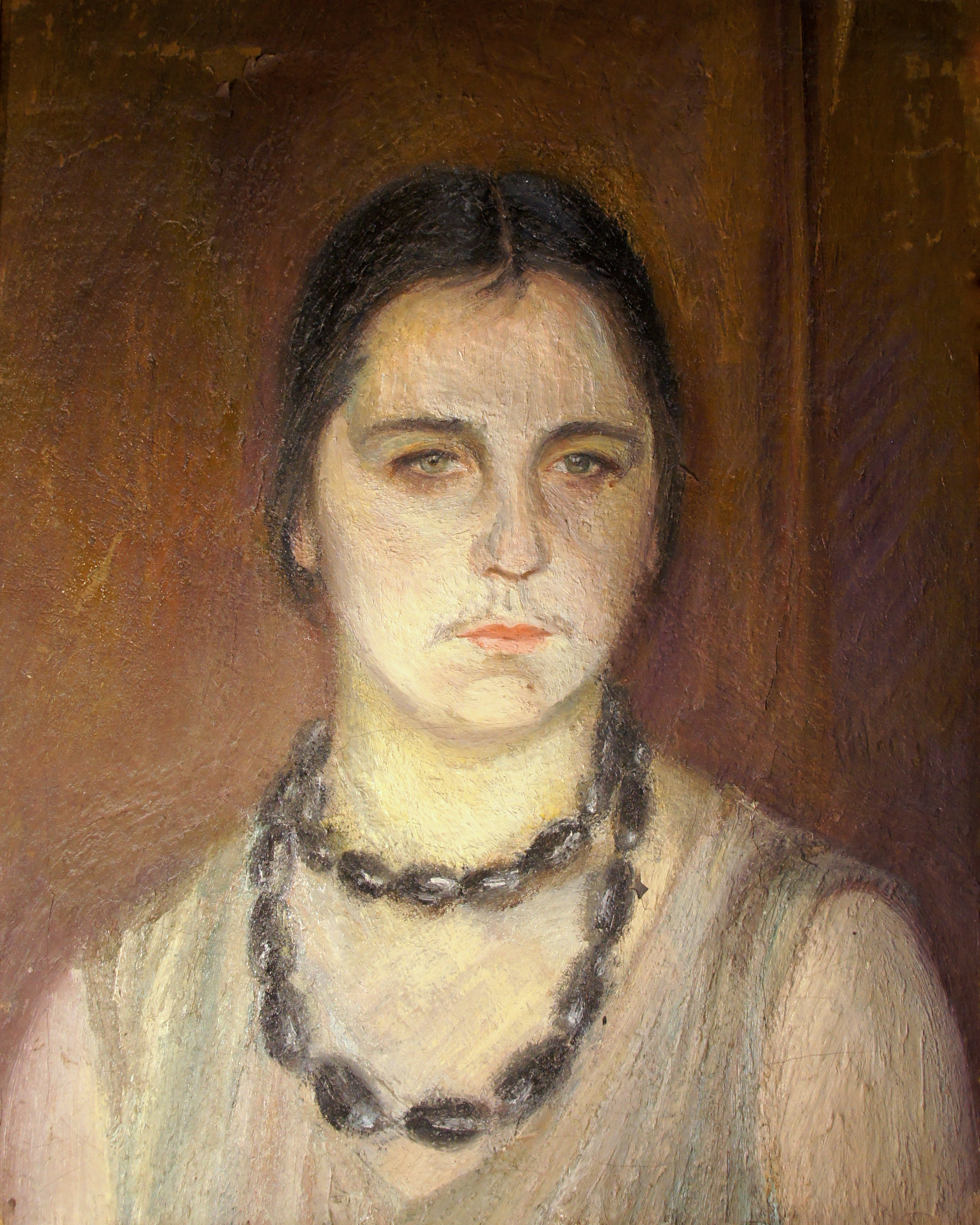
Wife portrait, 1931

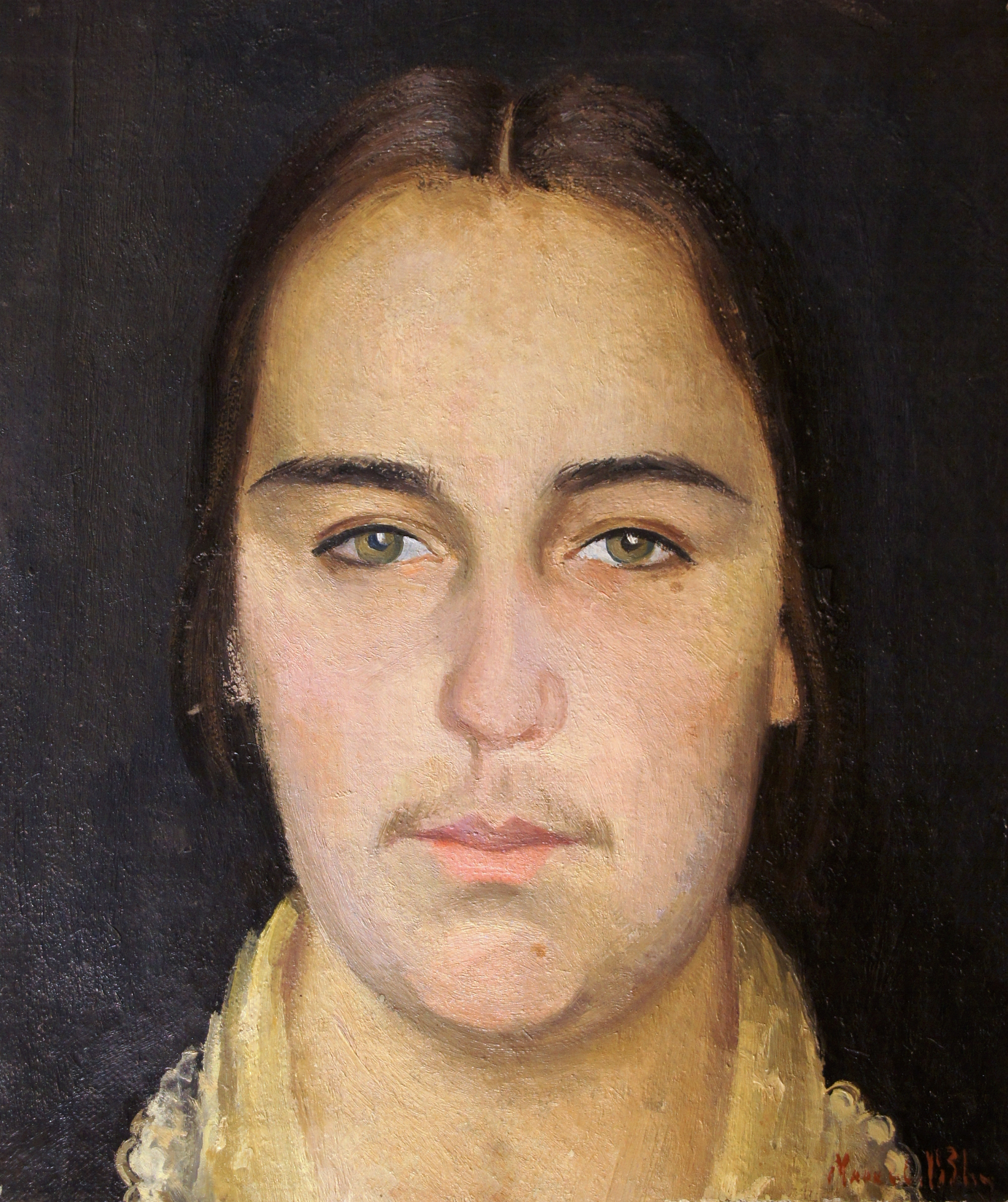
Wife portrait, 1933

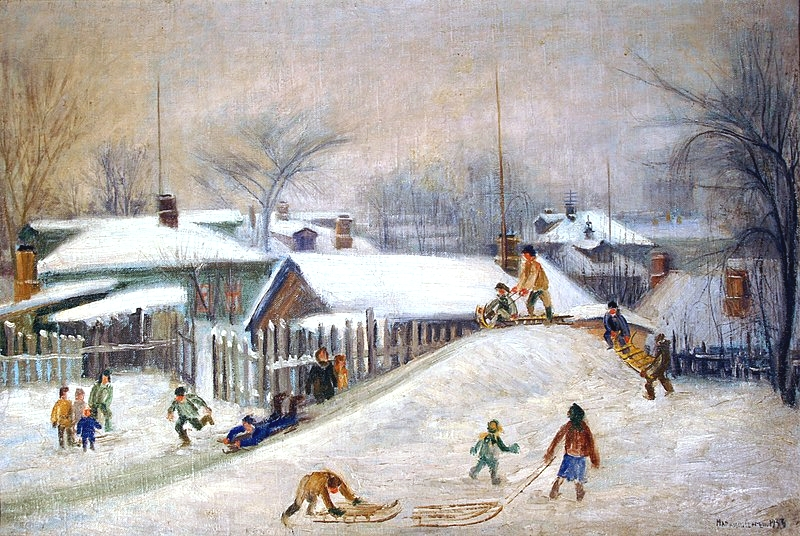
Moscow, 1933

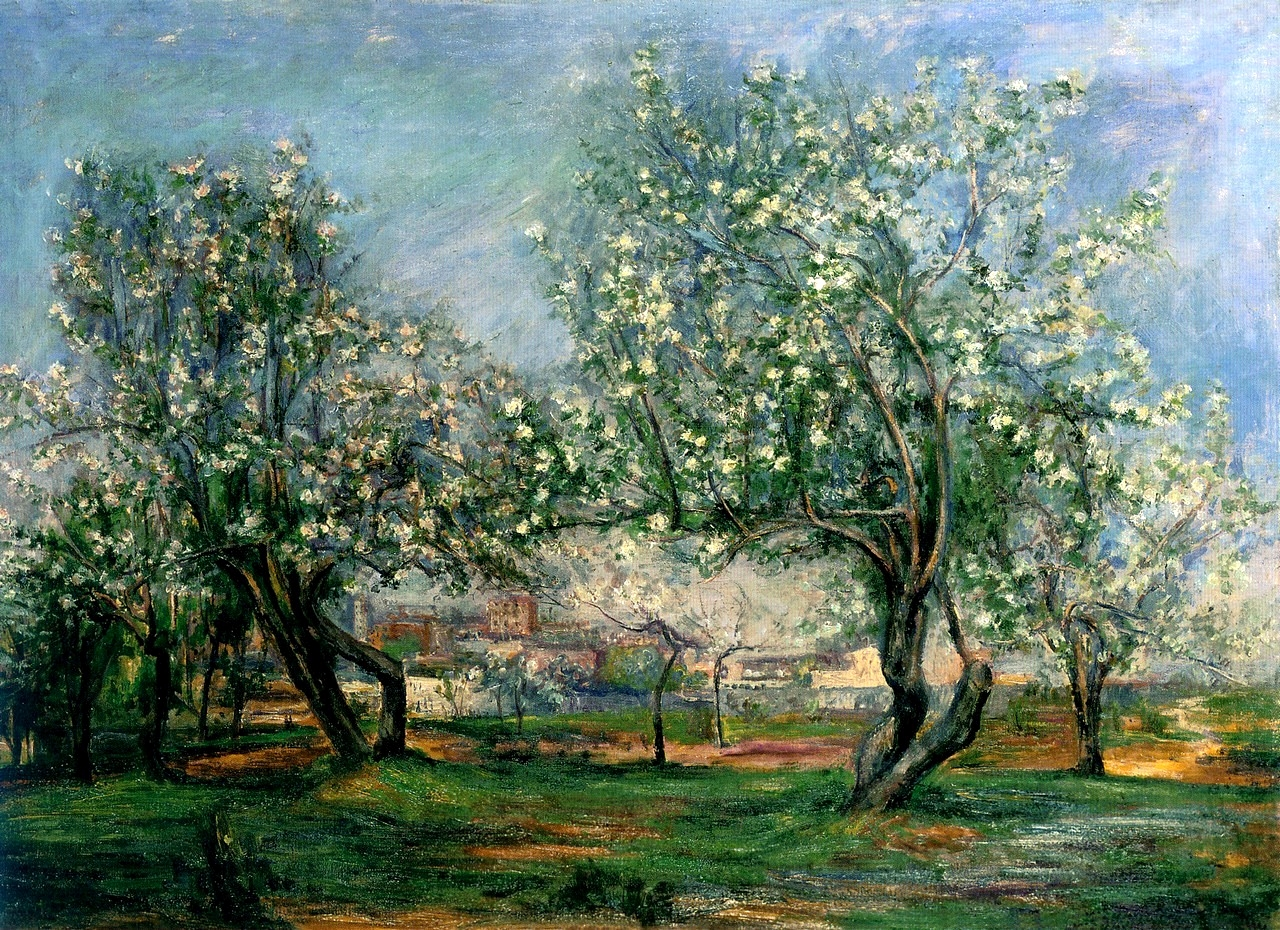
Appe trees, 1936

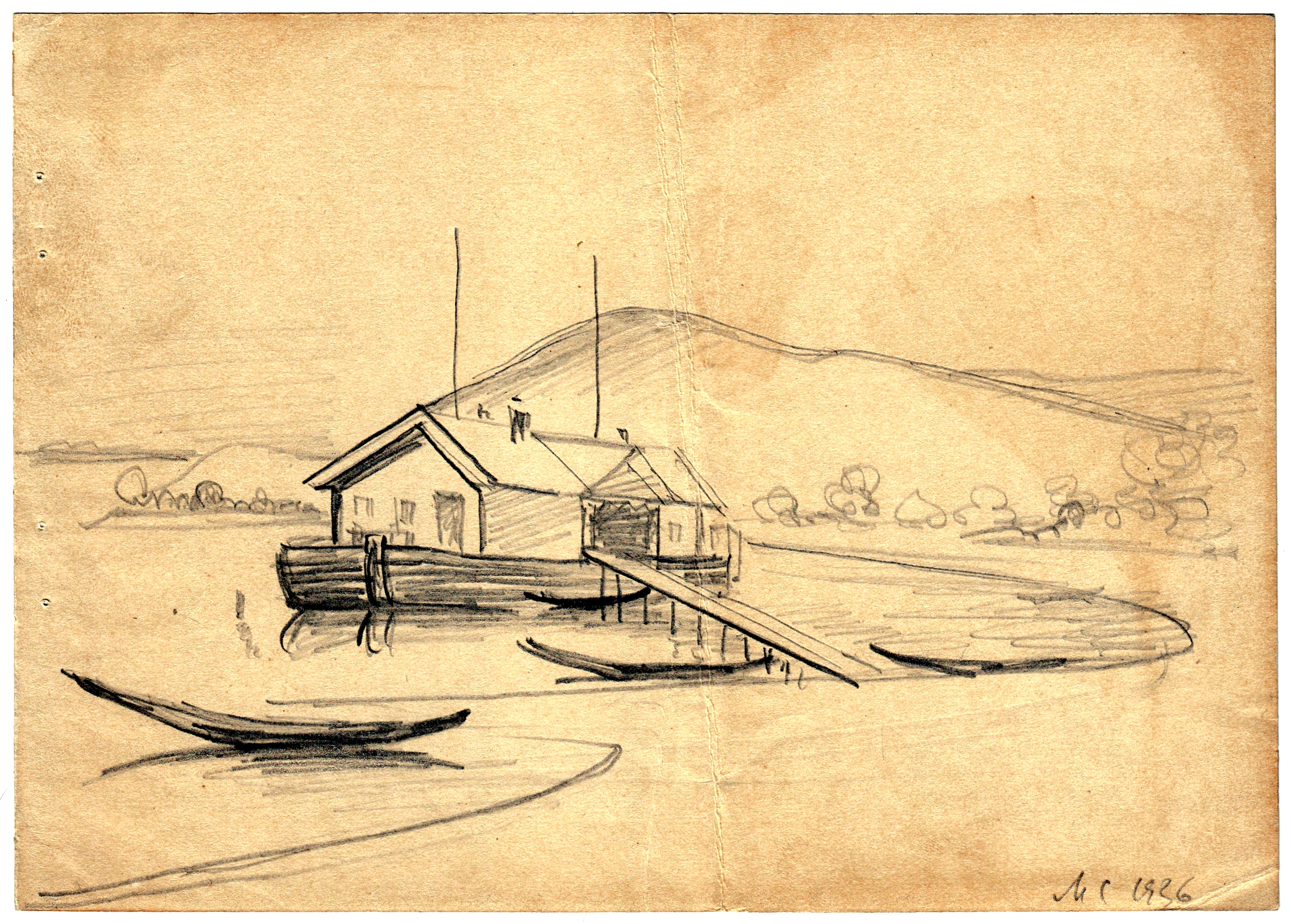
Drawing, 1936

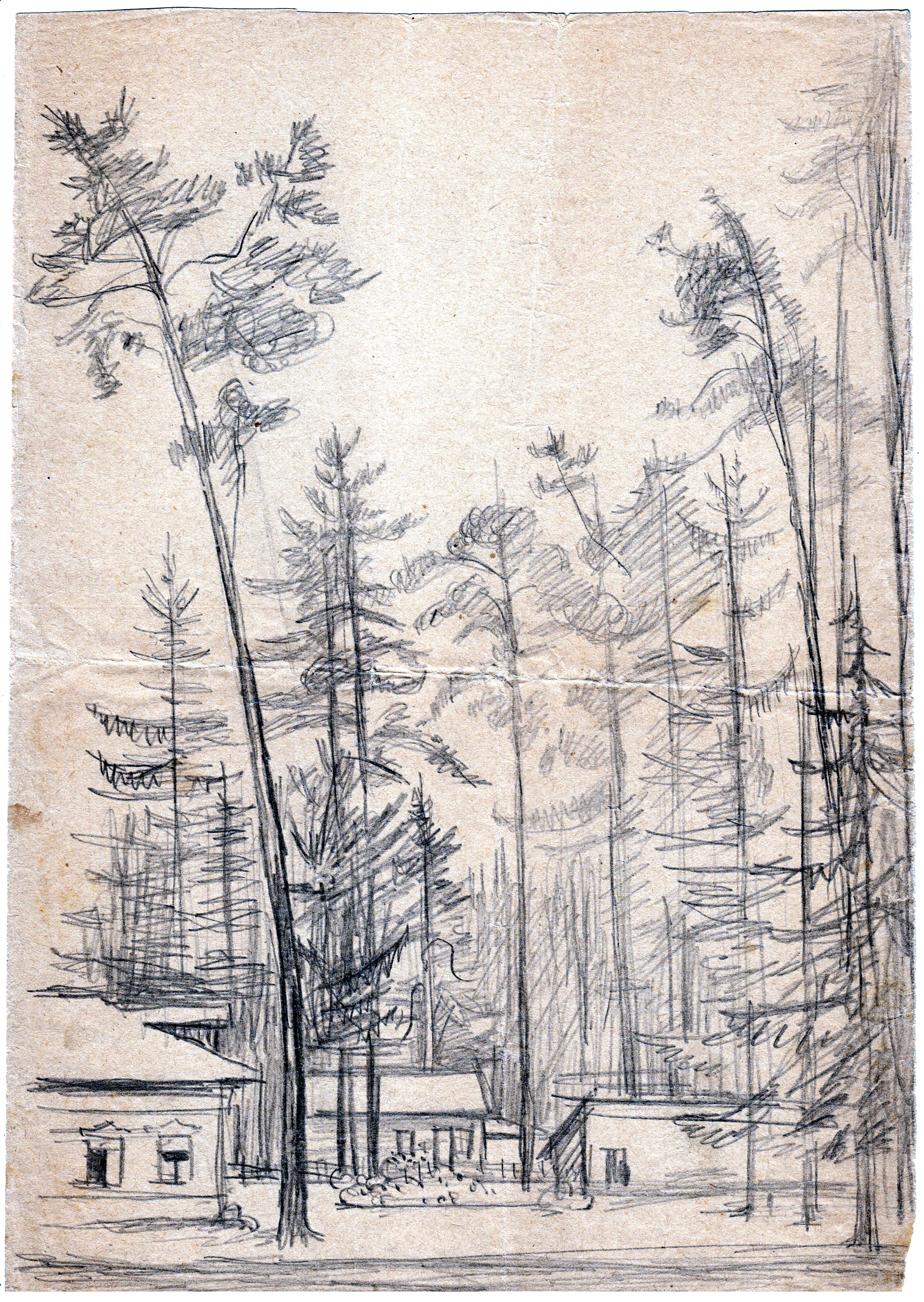
Drawing, Moscow region

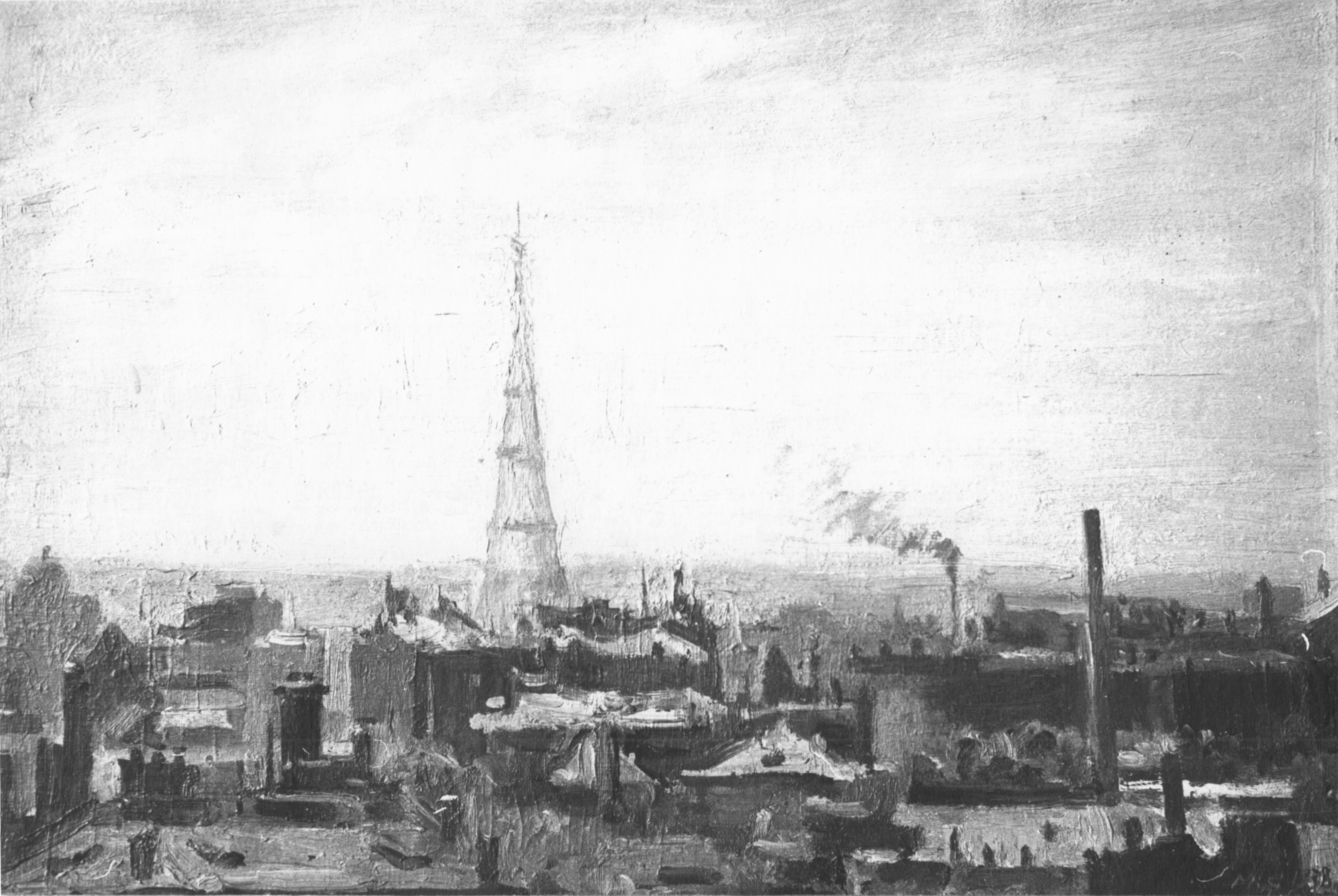
Moscow, 1938

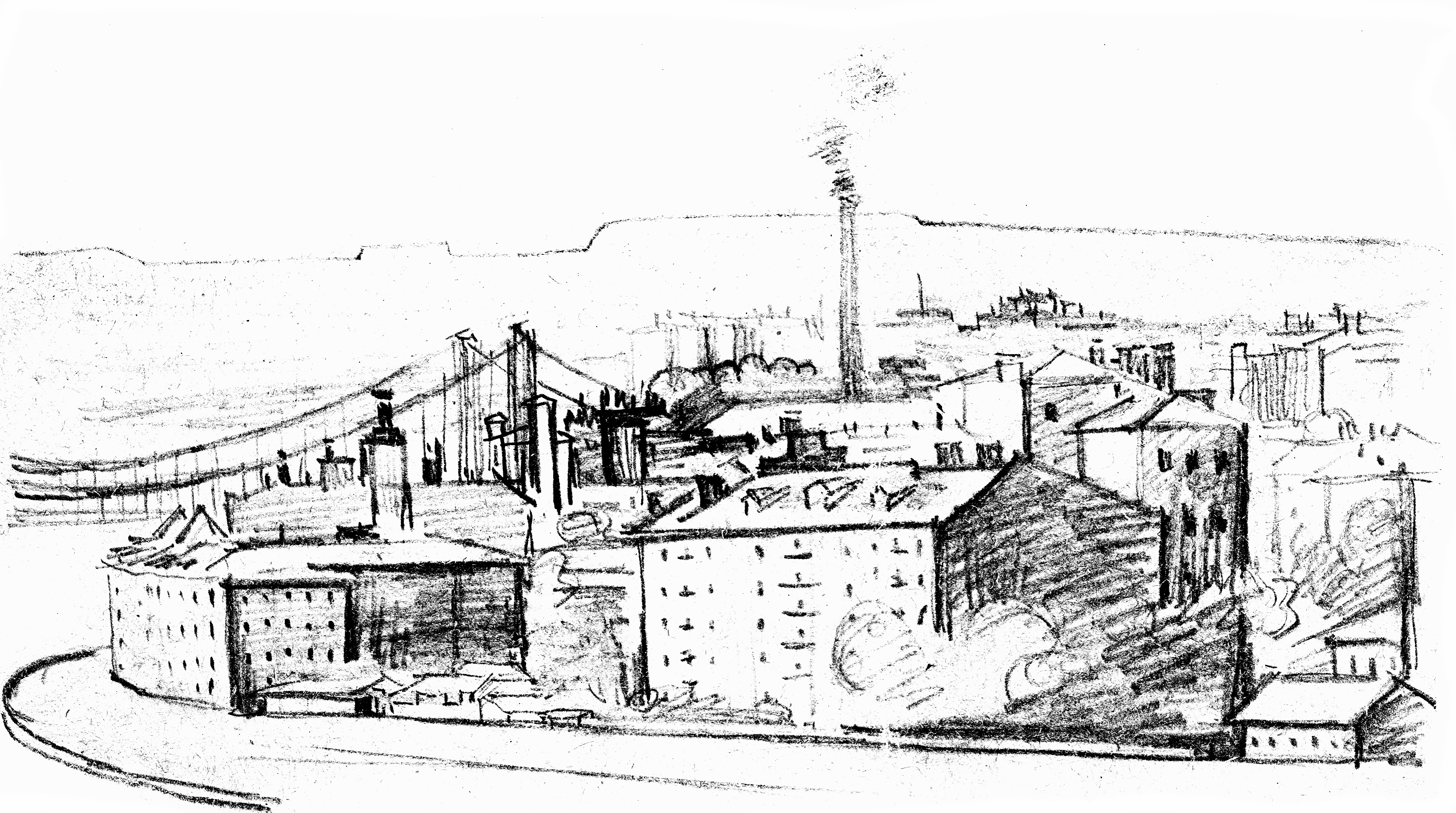
Moscow

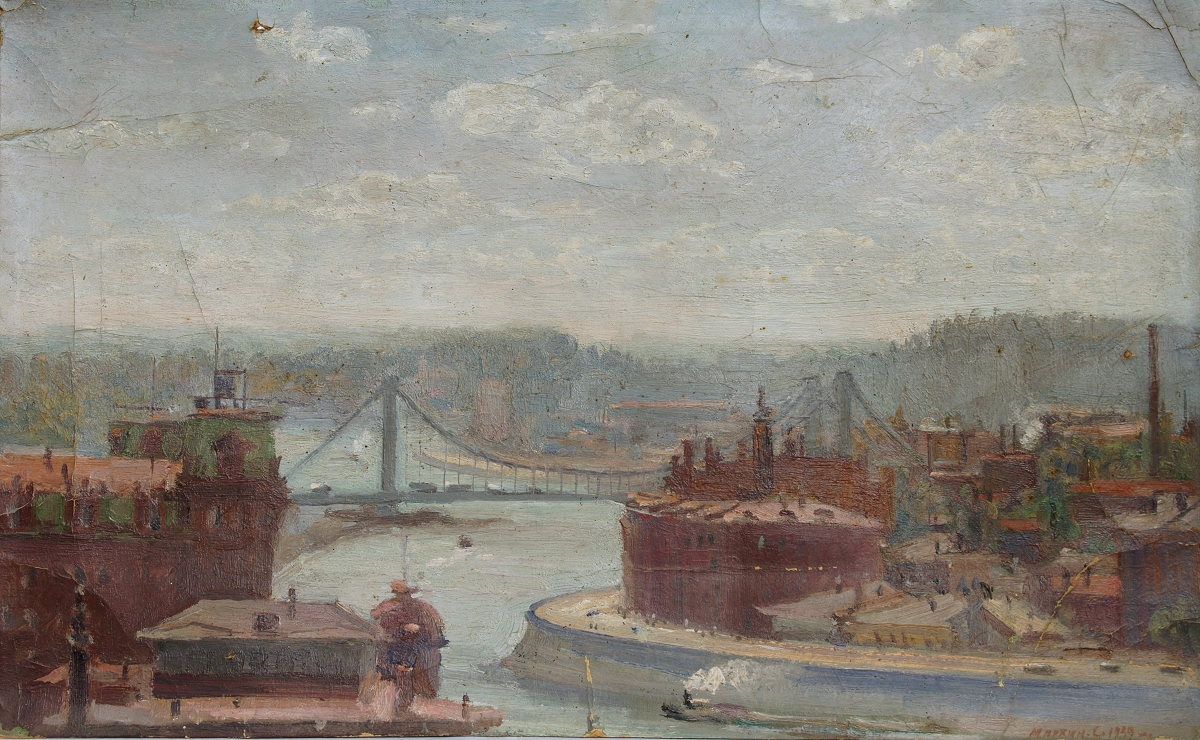
Moscow, 1939

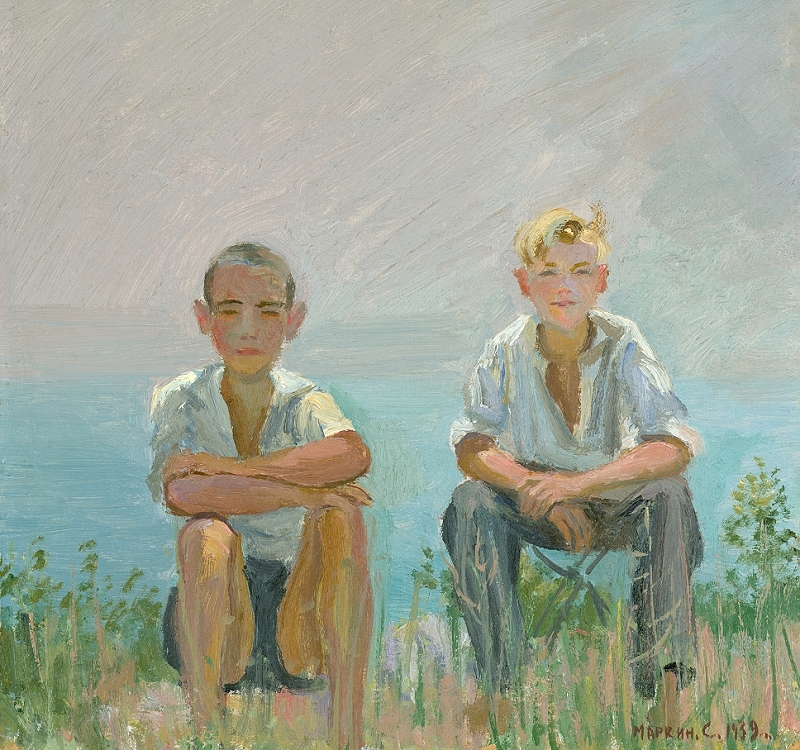
Russian South, 1939

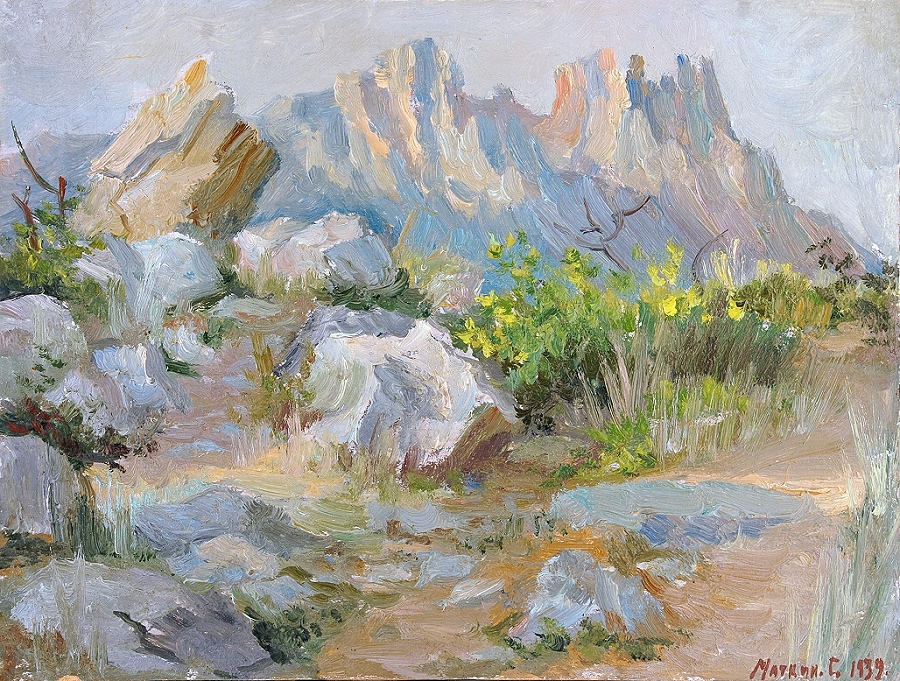
Crimea, 1939

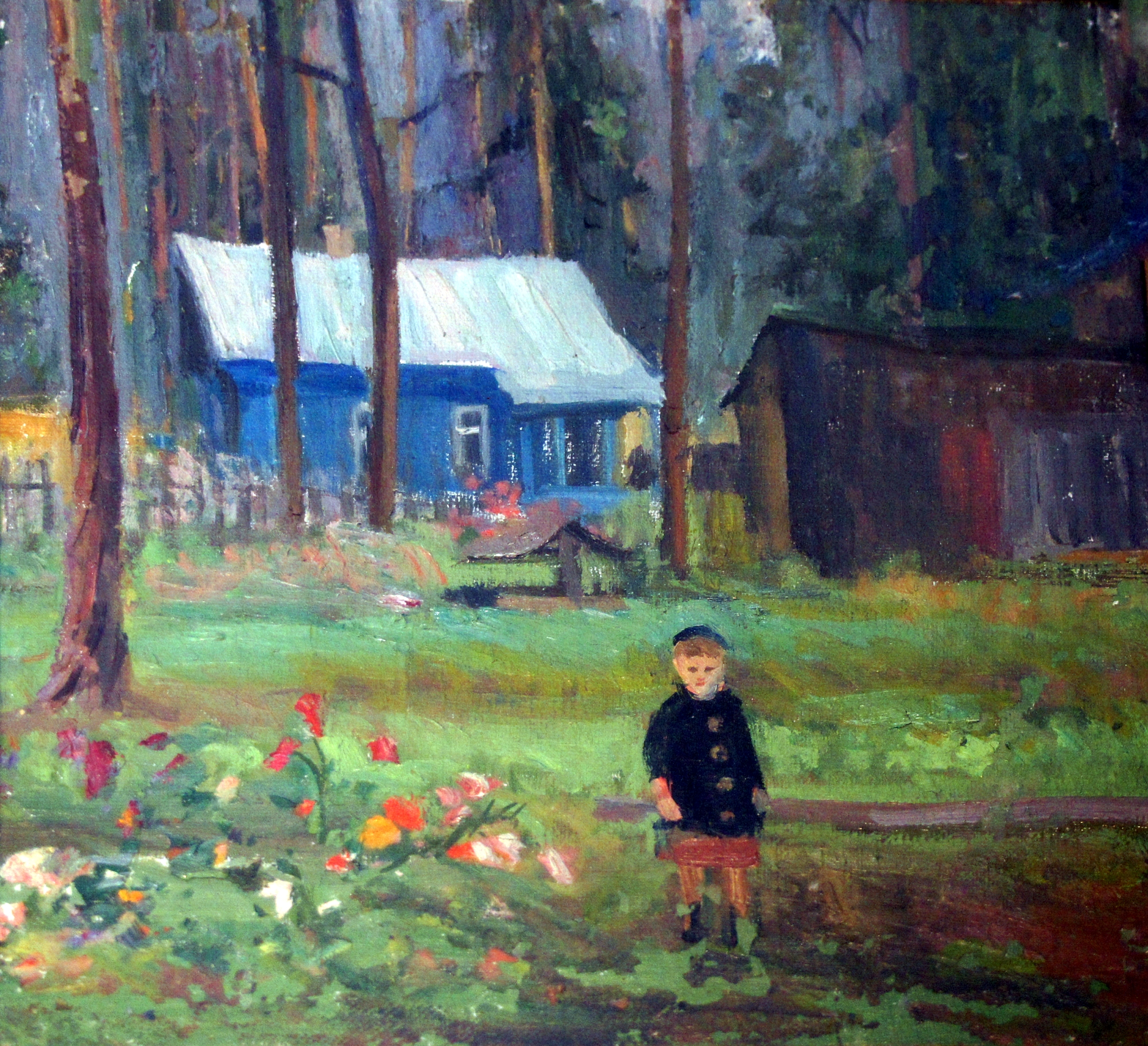
Moscow region, 1939

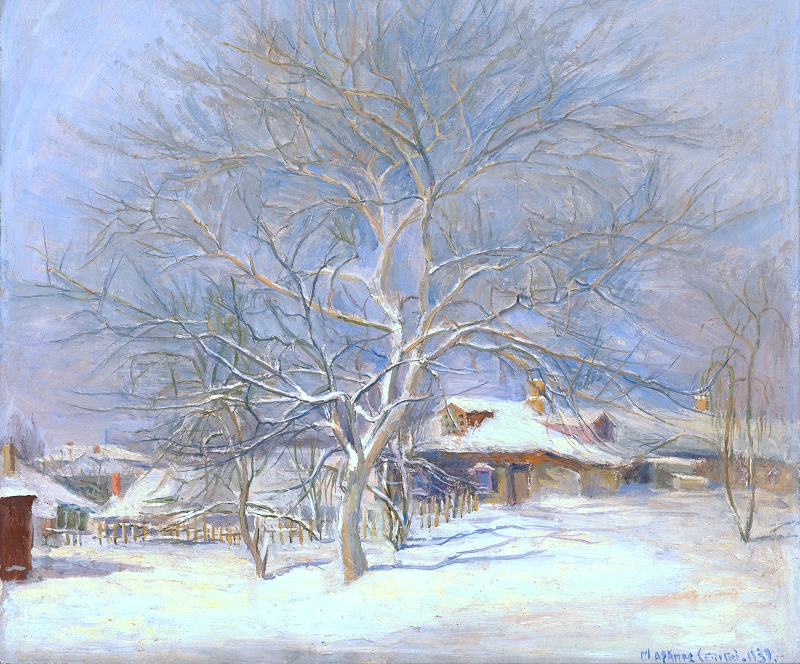
Moscow, 1939

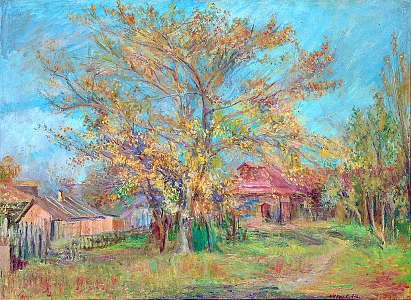
Moscow

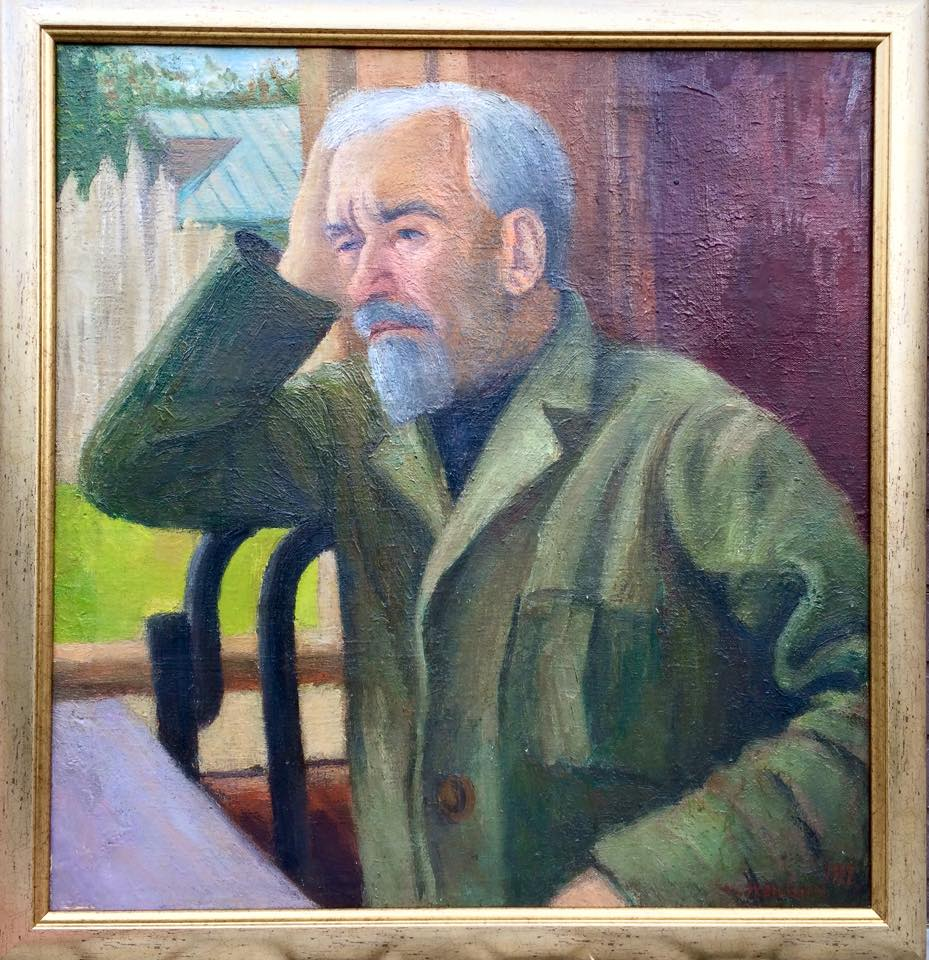
Father portrait (1878–1933)

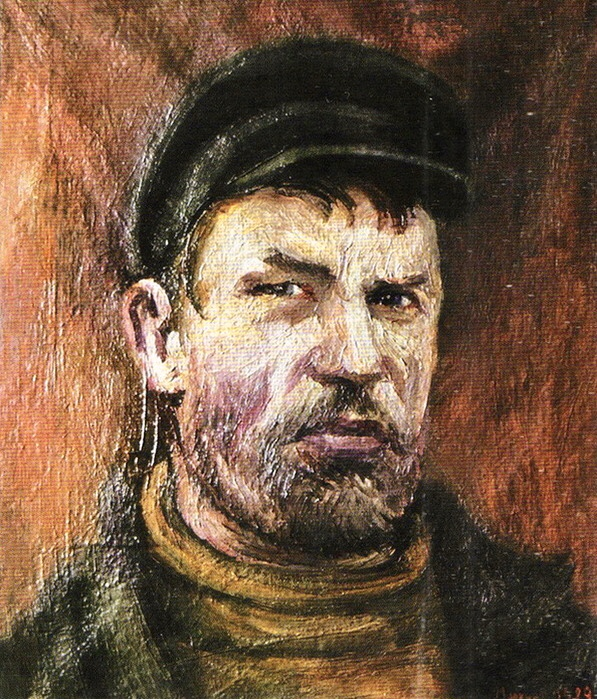
Weaver

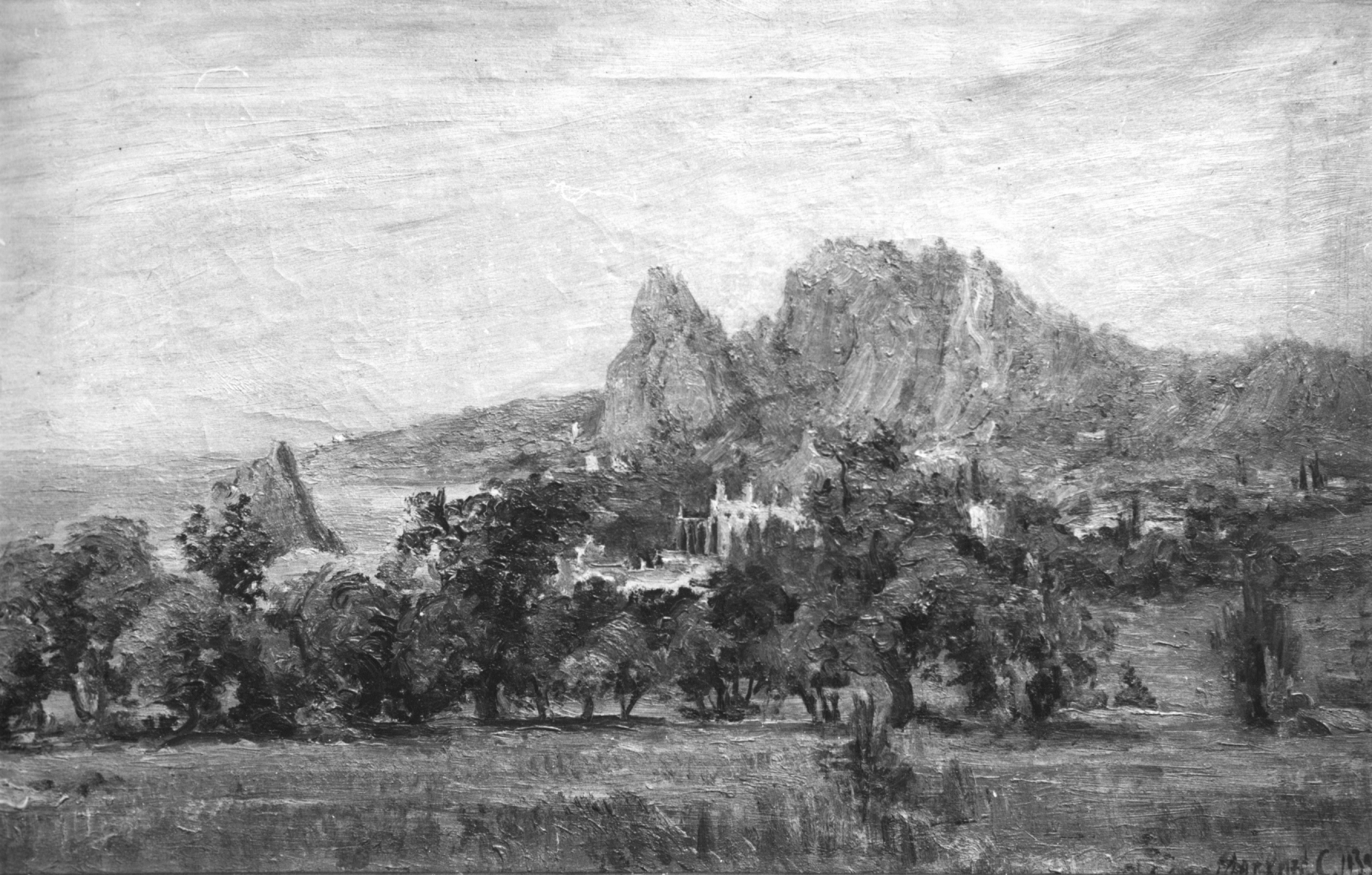
Etude, 1939

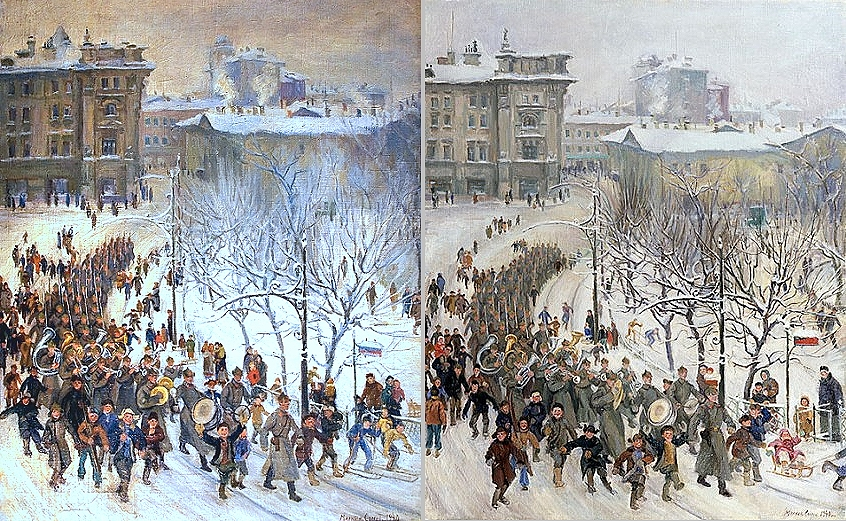
Moscow, 1940

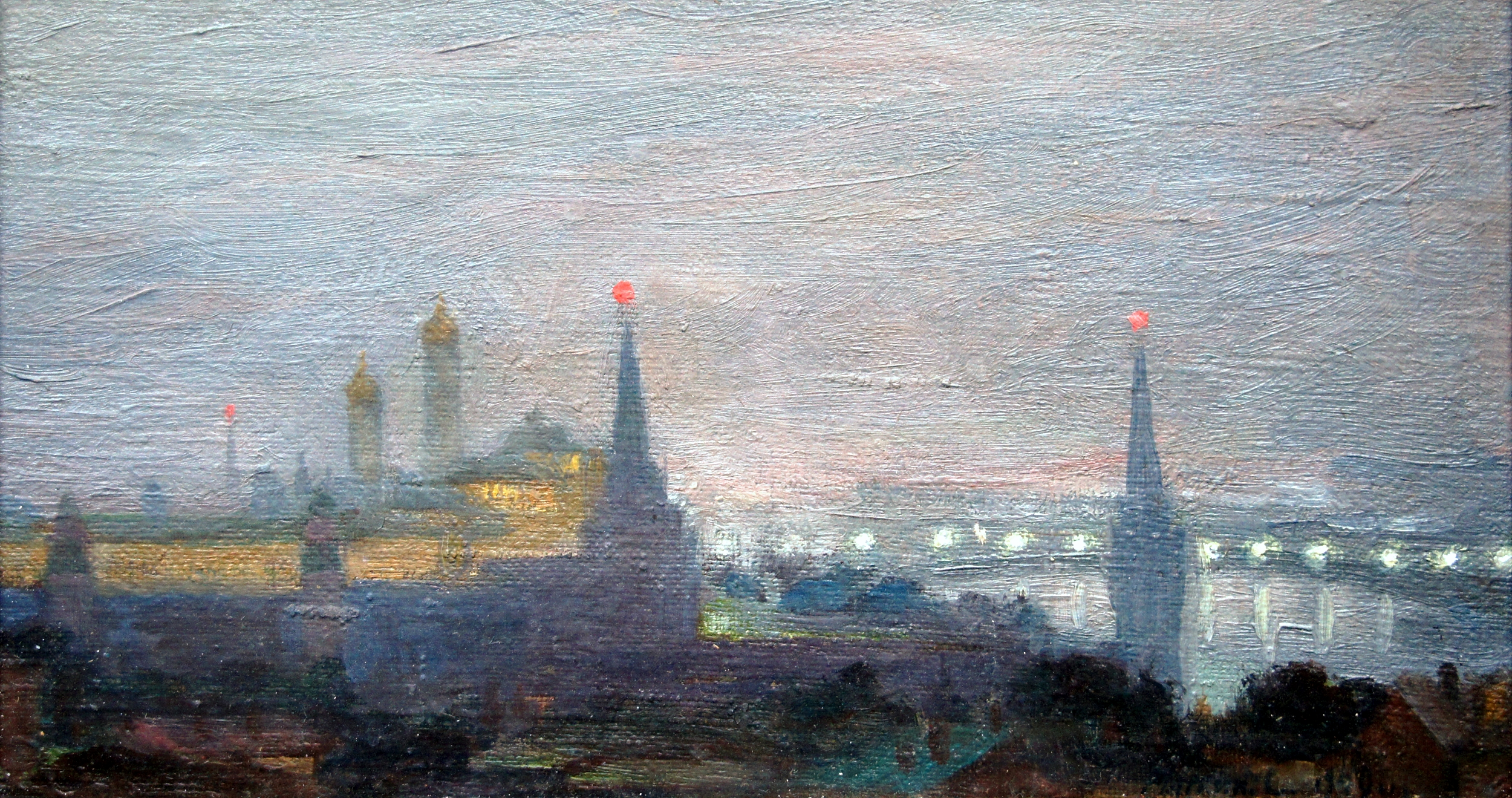
Moscow, Kremlin

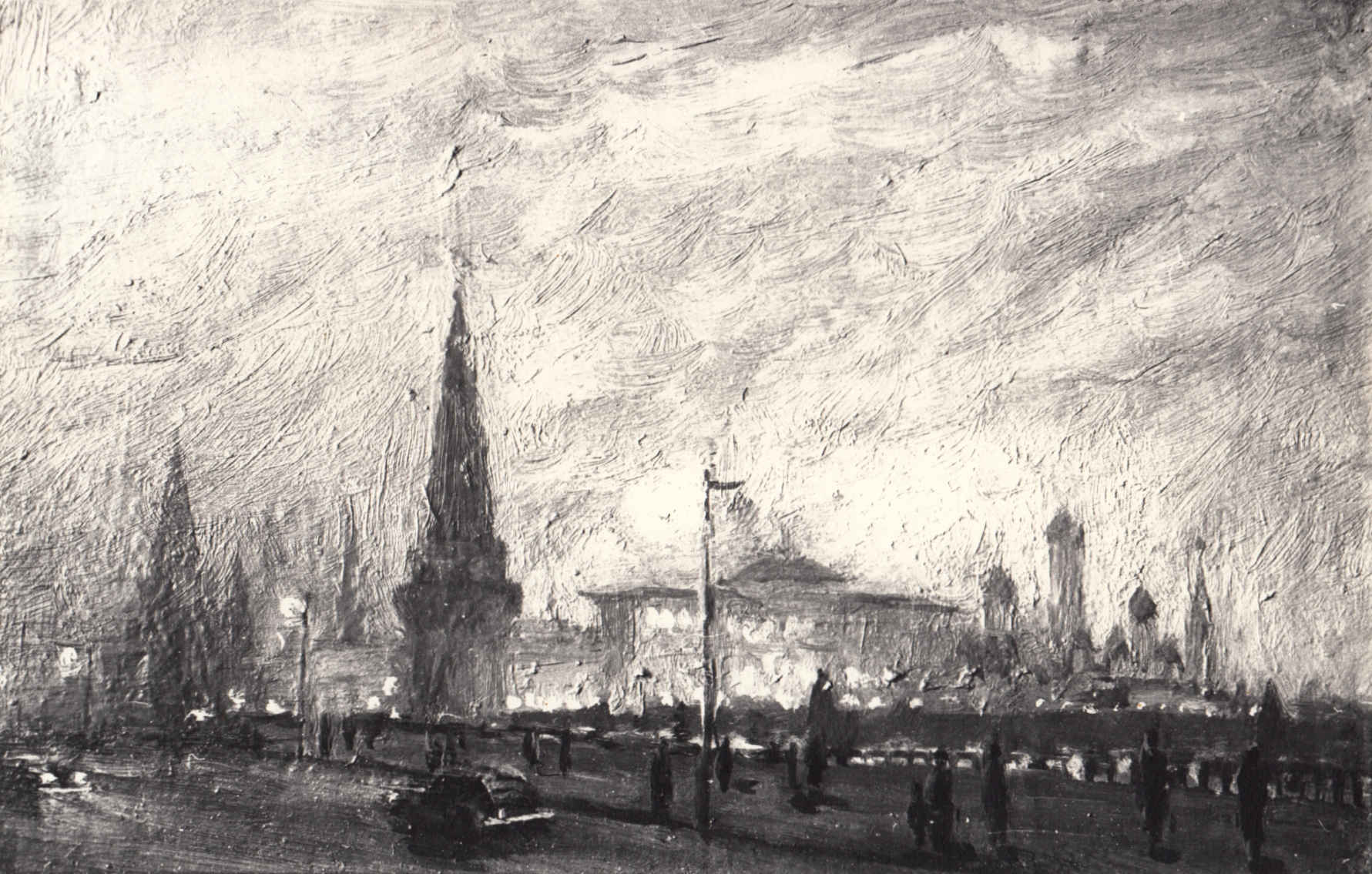
Moscow, Kremlin, 1940

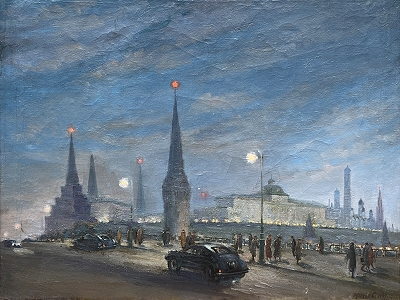
Moscow, 1941

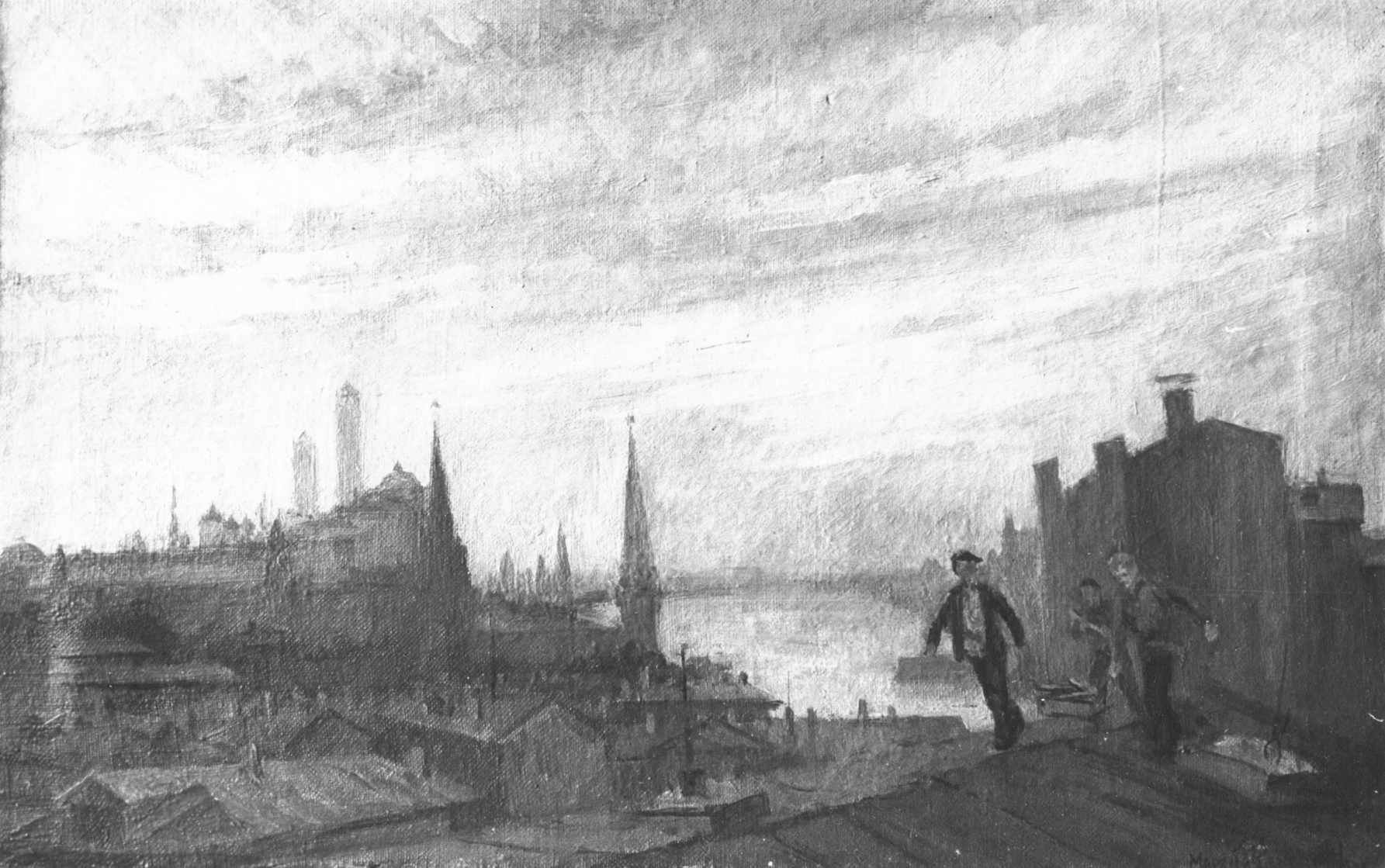
Moscow, 1941.

== Literature ==
List of publications about S. Markin (mostly in Russian):

- 1927: Иванова-Веэн Л. И. Маркин С. И.: 1927 Живфак // ВХУТЕМАС — ВХУТЕИН: Москва — Ленинград: Выпускники 1920—1930: Справочник. М.: АртКомМедиа, 2010. С. 14. (всего 48 с. Тираж 500 экз.)
- 1932: Выставка художников-одиночек // Пролетарское искусство. 1932. No. 7/8. С. 29.
- 1933: Художники РСФСР за 15 лет: (1917–1932) Каталог юбилейной выставки живописи, графики, и скульптуры. Л., 1933.
- 1934: Художник, живописец, декоратор и гравёр по дереву Сергей Иванович Маркин: выставка в клубе им. М. Горького / Всероссийский кооперативный Союз работников изобразительных искусств; отв. ред. Ю. М. Славинский. Москва: Всехудожник, 1934. 5, [1] с.; 15 см. (РГБ. Искусство. Хранение: 90/8.695)
- 1980: Ройтенберг О. О. Москва в творчестве художника // Искусство. 1980. No. 8.
- 1981: Московские художники в дни Великой Отечественной войны: Воспоминания. Письма. Статьи. / Ред. П. К. Суздалев, Сост. В. А. Юматов. М.: Советский художник, 1981. 511 с.
- 1985: Ройтенберг О. О. Они погибли на войне // Искусство. 1985. No. 4.
- 1991: Московские художники 20-30-е годы. Каталог. М.: МОСХ, ЦДХ, 1991.
- 2008: Ройтенберг О. О. Неужели кто-то вспомнил, что мы были... : Из истории художественной жизни. 1925–1935. М.: Галарт, 2008. 559 с.
- 2022: Диденко Ю. В. Маркин Сергей Иванович: (Каталожные No. 133—138) // Каталог собрания Живопись первой половины XX века. Т. 6. Кн. 3. (буквы М-П). Москва: Август Борг, 2022. С. 69–71. (Каталог собрания Государственной Третьяковской галереи; Серия Живопись VIII—XX веков).

== Links ==
- Sergei Markin — Russian art in 20th century (in Russian: русское искусство: XX век).
- Sergey Markin — Facebook page.
