= Vladislav Baskov =

Russian footballer

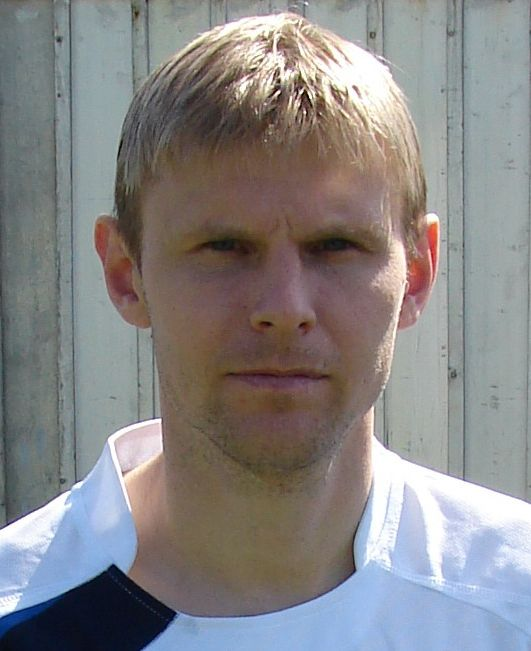

Personal information
- Full name: Vladislav Gennadyevich Baskov
- Date of birth: 20 December 1975 (age 50)
- Height: 1.77 m (5 ft 10 in)
- Position: Midfielder

Senior career*
Years	Team	Apps	(Gls)
1994–1995	Zenit Saint Petersburg	3	(0)
1996	Shanghai Shenhua	20	(2)
1997	Guangzhou Songri		
1998	Gazovik-Gazprom Izhevsk	20	(1)
1999	Ventspils	15	(1)
1999–2003	Dynamo Saint Petersburg	119	(14)
2004	Arsenal Tula	21	(2)
2005	Sodovik Sterlitamak	32	(3)
2006	Fakel Voronezh	22	(1)
2007	Dynamo Saint Petersburg	19	(3)
- * Club domestic league appearances and goals

Vladislav Gennadyevich Baskov (Russian: Владислав Геннадьевич Басков, born 20 December 1975) is a former Russian football midfielder.

== Club career ==
He played 6 seasons in the Russian Football National League for 5 different teams.
