= Sergei Markin (footballer) =

Russian footballer and coach

Personal information
- Full name: Sergei Vladimirovich Markin
- Date of birth: 14 May 1966 (age 60)
- Height: 1.83 m (6 ft 0 in)
- Position: Defender

Youth career
- FC Dynamo Moscow

Senior career*
Years	Team	Apps	(Gls)
1984	Kolkhozchi Ashkhabad		
1985	FC Shakhrikhanets Shakhrikhan	28	(0)
1986	FC Pakhtakor Andijan	32	(1)
1987	FC Volga Kalinin	32	(2)
1988–1991	FC Alga Frunze	99	(1)
1991–1992	Mohácsi TE		
1992	György Pécs		
1992	Ferencvárosi TC	0	(0)
1992	FC Dynamo-Gazovik Tyumen	12	(0)
1993	FC Okean Nakhodka	2	(0)
1994	Mohun Bagan A.C.		
1995	FC Salyut-Tushino Moscow		
1995–1996	Happy Valley AA		
1996	Shenzhen Feiyada		
1997–1999	KaIK/TePa		
2006	FC Soyuznik Moscow		

Managerial career
- 2000–2014: Perovets-Novokosino Moscow (youth)
- * Club domestic league appearances and goals

Sergei Vladimirovich Markin (Russian: Сергей Владимирович Маркин; born 14 May 1966) is a Russian football coach and a former player.
