= Iran national football team results (1980–1989) =

This is a list of official football games played by Iran national football team between 1980 and 1989.

== 1980 ==
Friendly

5 August 1980

United Arab Emirates	0–2	Iran
	Report	Danaeifard 13'; Faraki 58'

Al-Ain Stadium, Al-Ain
Attendance: 8,000
Referee: Jassim Al-Doukhi (United Arab Emirates)

Friendly

7 August 1980

United Arab Emirates	0–3	Iran
	Report	Faraki 10'; Abdollahi 28'; Barzegari 59'

Al-Nahyan Stadium, Abu Dhabi
Attendance: 10,000
Referee: Abbas Mohammed (United Arab Emirates)

1980 AFC Asian Cup – Preliminary round

17 September 1980

Iran	0–0	Syria
	Report

Sabah Al-Salem Stadium, Kuwait City
Attendance: 15,000
Referee: Toshikazu Sano (Japan)

1980 AFC Asian Cup – Preliminary round

20 September 1980

Iran	2–2	China
Alidousti 35'; Fariba 70'	Report	Chen Jingang 74'; Cai Jinbiao 89'

Sabah Al-Salem Stadium, Kuwait City
Attendance: 10,000
Referee: Sudarso Hardjowasito (Indonesia)

1980 AFC Asian Cup – Preliminary round

22 September 1980

Iran	7–0	Bangladesh
Fariba 11', 37', 80', 82'; Roshan 21'; Barzegari 32', 87'	Report

Sabah Al-Salem Stadium, Kuwait City
Attendance: 2,000

1980 AFC Asian Cup – Preliminary round

24 September 1980

Iran	3–2	North Korea
Alidousti 27'; Danaeifard 57'; Fariba 60'	Report	Hwang Sang-hoi 68'; Pak Jong-hun 90'

Sabah Al-Salem Stadium, Kuwait City
Attendance: 4,000
Referee: Enrique Mendoza (Mexico)

1980 AFC Asian Cup – Semifinal

28 September 1980

Kuwait	2–1	Iran
Yaqoub 63'; Al-Dakhil 85'	Report	Faraki 90'

Sabah Al-Salem Stadium, Kuwait City
Attendance: 20,000
Referee: Kok Lee (Singapore)

1980 AFC Asian Cup – 3rd place match

29 September 1980

Iran	3–0	North Korea
Fariba 49'; Faraki 66', 76'	Report

Sabah Al-Salem Stadium, Kuwait City
Attendance: 2,000
Referee: Enrique Mendoza (Mexico)

== 1982 ==
1982 Quaid-e-Azam International Tournament

17 February 1982

Pakistan	0–1	Iran
	Report	Anjini 7'

Karachi
Referee: Mohsen Abdulrahman (Oman)

1982 Quaid-e-Azam International Tournament

19 February 1982

Iran	4–0	Nepal
Heidari 2'; Dinvarzadeh 22'; Faridinia 50'; Changiz 62' (pen.)	Report

Karachi
Referee: Anwar Sultan Bhatti (Pakistan)

1982 Quaid-e-Azam International Tournament

23 February 1982

Iran	4–0	Oman
Changiz 27'; Haghighian 40'; Tahmasebi 50'; Anjini 76'	Report

Karachi
Referee: Karimuddin Nawab (Pakistan)

1982 Quaid-e-Azam International Tournament

25 February 1982

Iran	9–0	Bangladesh
Heidari 7', 38'; Faridinia 22', 44'; Tahmasebi 58'; Changiz 66', 70'; Anjini 79', 88'	Report

Karachi
Referee: Mohsen Abdulrahman (Oman)

1982 Asian Games – Preliminary round

21 November 1982

Japan	1–0	Iran
Kimura 79'	Report

Chhatrasal Stadium, New Delhi
Attendance: 5,000
Referee: Othman Omar (Malaysia)

1982 Asian Games – Preliminary round

23 November 1982
17:30

Iran	1–0	South Korea
Derakhshan 47'	Report

Jawaharlal Nehru Stadium, New Delhi
Attendance: 31,000
Referee: Melvyn Victor D'Souza (India)

1982 Asian Games – Preliminary round

25 November 1982

Iran	2–0	South Yemen
Mohammadkhani 49'; Firouzi 67'	Report

Ambedkar Stadium, New Delhi
Attendance: 8,000
Referee: Soundara Pandian (India)

1982 Asian Games – Quarterfinal

28 November 1982

Kuwait	1–0 (a.e.t.)	Iran
Al-Haddad 97'	Report

Jawaharlal Nehru Stadium, New Delhi
Attendance: 50,000
Referee: Melvyn Victor D'Souza (India)

== 1984 ==
1984 AFC Asian Cup qualifier

7 August 1984

Bangladesh	0–5	Iran
	Report	Mohammadkhani 65', 78', 81', 89'; Alidousti 90'

Gelora Senayan Stadium, Jakarta
Attendance: 5,000
Referee: Chlandar (India)

1984 AFC Asian Cup qualifier

9 August 1984

Iran	3–1	Syria
Alidousti 3', 76' (pen.); Mohammadkhani 67'	Report	Hassan 4'

Gelora Senayan Stadium, Jakarta
Attendance: 10,000
Referee: Yu Jong-lin (North Korea)

1984 AFC Asian Cup qualifier

11 August 1984

Iran	5–0	Thailand
Memar 25'; Alidousti 31', 81'; Mohammadkhani 55'; Derakhshan 63'	Report

Gelora Senayan Stadium, Jakarta
Attendance: 10,000
Referee: Kim Soo-duk (North Korea)

1984 AFC Asian Cup qualifier

13 August 1984

Iran	1–0	Indonesia
Mohammadkhani 78'	Report

Gelora Senayan Stadium, Jakarta
Attendance: 65,000
Referee: Yu Jong-lin (North Korea)

1984 AFC Asian Cup qualifier

15 August 1984

Iran	7–1	Philippines
Arabshahi 16'; Mohammadkhani 20', 52'; Alidousti 48'; Ahadi 50', 89'; Mokhtarifar 77'	Report	Aranto 70'

Gelora Senayan Stadium, Jakarta
Attendance: 4,000
Referee: Shing Ao Chi (Hong Kong)

1984 AFC Asian Cup qualifier

18 August 1984

Iran	1–0	Syria
Alidousti 13'	Report

Gelora Senayan Stadium, Jakarta
Attendance: 4,000
Referee: Kim Soo-duk (North Korea)

1984 AFC Asian Cup – Preliminary round

1 December 1984
21:00

Iran	3–0	United Arab Emirates
Alidousti 27'; Bayani 85' (pen.); Mohammadkhani 87'	Report

National Stadium, Singapore
Attendance: 8,000
Referee: Toshikazu Sano (Japan)

1984 AFC Asian Cup – Preliminary round

3 December 1984
19:00

China	0–2	Iran
	Report	Mohammadkhani 57'; Arabshahi 69'

National Stadium, Singapore
Attendance: 19,000
Referee: George Courtney (England)

1984 AFC Asian Cup – Preliminary round

7 December 1984
19:00

Iran	0–0	India
	Report

National Stadium, Singapore
Attendance: 10,000
Referee: Koh Guan Kiat (Malaysia)

1984 AFC Asian Cup – Preliminary round

10 December 1984
19:00

Singapore	1–1	Iran
Saad 61'	Report	Bayani 55' (pen.)

National Stadium, Singapore
Attendance: 2,000
Referee: Abu Wahid Shanbe (Oman)

1984 AFC Asian Cup – Semifinal

13 December 1984
20:00

Saudi Arabia	1–1 (a.e.t.)	Iran
Bayani 88' (o.g.)	Report	Bayani 43'
Penalties
Abdullah (penalty scored); Abduljawad (penalty scored); Nu'eimeh (penalty scored); Al-Jam'an (penalty scored); Al-Musaibeah (penalty scored)	5–4	(penalty scored) Hajiloo; (penalty scored) Mokhtarifar; (penalty scored) Derakhshan; (penalty missed) Panjali; (penalty scored) Bayani

National Stadium, Singapore
Attendance: 20,000
Referee: George Courtney (England)

1984 AFC Asian Cup – 3rd place match

16 December 1984
18:00

Iran	1–1	Kuwait
Mohammadkhani 80'	Report	Al-Haddad 26'
Penalties
Hajiloo (penalty scored); Derakhshan (penalty scored); Ahadi (penalty scored); Mokhtarifar (penalty missed)	3–5	(penalty scored) Al-Dakhil; (penalty scored) Al-Suwayed; (penalty scored) Juma'a; (penalty scored) Al-Jasem; (penalty scored) Al-Qabendi

National Stadium, Singapore
Attendance: 26,000
Referee: Antonio Márquez (Mexico)

== 1985 ==
1985 Nehru Cup – Preliminary round

20 January 1985

Yugoslavia	3–1	Iran
Baljić 36', 59'; Mlinarić 82'	Report	Bayani 74'

Maharaja's College Stadium, Kochi
Attendance: 55,000
Referee: Hakim Shetty (India)

1985 Nehru Cup – Preliminary round

28 January 1985

Soviet Union	2–0	Iran
Zygmantovich 48'; Protasov 69'	Report

Maharaja's College Stadium, Kochi
Attendance: 55,000
Referee: Floriano Sanches (India)

Friendly

5 February 1985

Iran	1–0	North Korea
Bayani	Report

Mashhad
Referee: Asghar Tehrani (Iran)

== 1986 ==
1986 Fajr Cup – Preliminary round

16 February 1986

Iran	2–0	Pakistan
Alidousti 8'; Changiz 16'	Report

Shahid Shiroudi Stadium, Tehran
Attendance: 20,000
Referee: Jamshid Nikmehr (Iran)

1986 Fajr Cup – Semifinal

20 February 1986

Iran	2–0	Ghana
Alidousti 10'; Bayani 40' (pen.)	Report

Azadi Stadium, Tehran
Attendance: 35,000
Referee: Hamid Khoshkhan (Iran)

Friendly

28 May 1986

China	2–1	Iran
Li Hui 34'; Liu Haiguang 82'	Report	Fathabadi 39'

Workers' Stadium, Beijing
Attendance: 35,000

Friendly

20 September 1986

Iran	4–0	Thailand
Bavi; Derakhshan; Pious; Changiz	Report

Seoul
Attendance: 0

1986 Asian Games – Preliminary round

22 September 1986
16:00

Japan	0–2	Iran
	Report	Abtahi 5'; Mohammadkhani 17'

Hanbat Stadium, Daejeon
Attendance: 15,000
Referee: Abdullah Al-Nasir (Saudi Arabia)

1986 Asian Games – Preliminary round

24 September 1986

Iran	4–0	Bangladesh
Pious 61'; Fathabadi 82', 89'; Ghayeghran 90'	Report

Hanbat Stadium, Daejeon
Attendance: 7,000
Referee: Lee Do-ha (South Korea)

1986 Asian Games – Preliminary round

26 September 1986
18:00

Kuwait	1–0	Iran
Al-Hasawi 18'	Report

Hanbat Stadium, Daejeon
Attendance: 13,000
Referee: Zhong Bohong (China)

1986 Asian Games – Preliminary round

28 September 1986
18:00

Iran	6–0	Nepal
Derakhshan 8', 76'; Bayani 44' (pen.); Fathabadi 51', 86'; Yekkeh 61'	Report

Hanbat Stadium, Daejeon
Attendance: 10,000
Referee: Ahmed Ali (Pakistan)

1986 Asian Games – Quarterfinal

1 October 1986
17:00

South Korea	1–1 (a.e.t.)	Iran
Park Chang-sun 34' (pen.)	Report	Bavi 84'
Penalties
Park Chang-sun (penalty scored); Kim Joo-sung (penalty scored); Choi Soon-ho (penalty scored); Cho Young-jeung (penalty scored); Lee Tae-ho (penalty scored)	5–4	(penalty scored) Ghayeghran; (penalty scored) Changiz; (penalty scored) Namjoo-Motlagh; (penalty missed) Mohammadkhani; (penalty scored) Hajiloo

Gudeok Stadium, Busan
Attendance: 30,000
Referee: Ahmed Jassim (Bahrain)

== 1988 ==
1988 AFC Asian Cup qualifier

27 May 1988

Iran	2–0	Hong Kong
Ghayeghran 9'; Marfavi 73'	Report

Dasarath Rangasala Stadium, Kathmandu
Attendance: 10,000
Referee: Xu Bingsheng (China)

1988 AFC Asian Cup qualifier

29 May 1988

Syria	1–1	Iran
Siflan 13'	Report	Bavi 73'

Dasarath Rangasala Stadium, Kathmandu
Attendance: 25,000
Referee: Abdulaziz Al-Mulla (United Arab Emirates)

1988 AFC Asian Cup qualifier

2 June 1988

North Korea	0–0	Iran
	Report

Dasarath Rangasala Stadium, Kathmandu
Attendance: 20,000
Referee: Abdulaziz Al-Mulla (United Arab Emirates)

1988 AFC Asian Cup qualifier

4 June 1988

Iran	3–0	Nepal
Bavi 6', 53', 67'	Report

Dasarath Rangasala Stadium, Kathmandu
Attendance: 20,000
Referee: Abdulaziz Al-Mulla (United Arab Emirates)

1988 AFC Asian Cup – Preliminary round

2 December 1988
16:00

Iran	2–0	Qatar
Bavi 6'; Pious 89'	Report

Hamad bin Khalifa Stadium, Doha
Attendance: 20,000
Referee: Michel Vautrot (France)

1988 AFC Asian Cup – Preliminary round

4 December 1988
15:00

Japan	0–0	Iran
	Report

Suheim bin Hamad Stadium, Doha
Attendance: 4,000
Referee: Samuel Chan (Hong Kong)

1988 AFC Asian Cup – Preliminary round

8 December 1988
15:00

Iran	1–0	United Arab Emirates
Pious 27'	Report

Suheim bin Hamad Stadium, Doha
Attendance: 4,000
Referee: Stephen Ovinis (Malaysia)

1988 AFC Asian Cup – Preliminary round

11 December 1988
17:00

South Korea	3–0	Iran
Byun Byung-joo 26', 57'; Hwang Sun-hong 42'	Report

Hamad bin Khalifa Stadium, Doha
Attendance: 5,000
Referee: Neji Jouini (Tunisia)

1988 AFC Asian Cup – Semifinal

15 December 1988
16:00

Saudi Arabia	1–0	Iran
Abdullah 16'	Report

Suheim bin Hamad Stadium, Doha
Attendance: 17,000
Referee: George Courtney (England)

1988 AFC Asian Cup – 3rd place match

17 December 1988
16:00

China	0–0 (a.e.t.)	Iran
	Report
Penalties
Duan Ju (penalty missed); Wang Baoshan (penalty missed); Wu Wenbing (penalty missed)	0–3	(penalty scored) Moharrami; (penalty scored) Ansarifard; (penalty scored) Ghayeghran

Hamad bin Khalifa Stadium, Doha
Attendance: 2,000
Referee: Ahmad Bash (Jordan)

== 1989 ==
Friendly

20 January 1989

Iran	2–2	Japan
Own goal 51'; Pious 62'	Report	Maeda 19', 57'

Azadi Stadium, Tehran
Attendance: 65,000
Referee: Manouchehr Nazari (Iran)

1990 FIFA World Cup qualifier – First round

23 February 1989

Thailand	0–3	Iran
	Report	Bavi 12'; Ghayeghran 28'; Garousi 87'

National Stadium, Bangkok
Attendance: 25,000
Referee: Samuel Chan (Hong Kong)

1990 FIFA World Cup qualifier – First round

27 February 1989

Bangladesh	1–2	Iran
Aslam 70'	Report	Bavi 44'; Ansarifard 50'

National Stadium, Dhaka
Attendance: 18,000
Referee: Mohammed Al-Shabab (Oman)

1990 FIFA World Cup qualifier – First round

17 March 1989

Iran	1–0	Bangladesh
Marfavi 81'	Report

Azadi Stadium, Tehran
Attendance: 60,000
Referee: Hassan Al-Mullah (Qatar)

1990 FIFA World Cup qualifier – First round

30 May 1989

Iran	3–0	Thailand
Pious 33', 65'; Garousi 42'	Report

Azadi Stadium, Tehran
Attendance: 55,000
Referee: Samuel Chan (Hong Kong)

1990 FIFA World Cup qualifier – First round

15 July 1989

China	2–0	Iran
Liu Haiguang 73'; Zhang Xiaowen 87'	Report

Wulihe Stadium, Shenyang
Attendance: 25,000
Referee: Shizuo Takada (Japan)

1990 FIFA World Cup qualifier – First round

22 July 1989

Iran	3–2	China
Garousi 15'; Eftekhari 16'; Pious 53'	Report	Mai Chao 64'; Ma Lin 66'

Azadi Stadium, Tehran
Attendance: 90,000
Referee: Jamal Al-Sharif (Syria)

1989 Peace and Friendship Cup – Preliminary round

1 November 1989

Iran	2–0	South Yemen
Namjoo-Motlagh 35', 61'	Report

Al-Sadaqua Walsalam Stadium, Kuwait City
Attendance: 1,000
Referee: Jean-François Crucke (Belgium)

1989 Peace and Friendship Cup – Preliminary round

3 November 1989

Guinea	1–1	Iran
Emmerson 75'	Report	Moharrami 48' (pen.)

Al-Sadaqua Walsalam Stadium, Kuwait City
Attendance: 1,000
Referee: Essa Al-Jassas (Kuwait)

1989 Peace and Friendship Cup – Preliminary round

5 November 1989

Iran	0–0	Iraq
	Report

Al-Sadaqua Walsalam Stadium, Kuwait City
Attendance: 3,000
Referee: Freddie Vilburg (Switzerland)

1989 Peace and Friendship Cup – Semifinal

8 November 1989

Uganda	2–2 (a.e.t.)	Iran
Hasule 24'; Musisi 107'	Report	Ansarifard 22'; Bayani 116'
Penalties
	7–6

Al-Sadaqua Walsalam Stadium, Kuwait City
Attendance: 1,000
Referee: Kim Milton Nielsen (Denmark)

1989 Peace and Friendship Cup – 3rd place match

12 November 1989

Kuwait	1–0	Iran
Al-Asfoor 5'	Report

Al-Sadaqua Walsalam Stadium, Kuwait City
Attendance: 8,000
Referee: Thomas Donnelly (Northern Ireland)

== Statistics ==
=== Results by year ===
Year	Pld	W	D	L	GF	GA	GD
1980	8	5	2	1	21	6	+15
1982	8	6	0	2	21	2	+19
1984	12	8	4	0	30	5	+25
1985	3	1	0	2	2	5	–3
1986	9	6	1	2	22	4	+18
1988	10	4	4	2	9	5	+4
1989	12	6	4	2	19	11	+8
Total	62	36	15	11	124	38	+86

=== Managers ===
Name	First match	Last match	Pld	W	D	L	GF	GA	GD
(Iran) Hassan Habibi	5 August 1980	25 February 1982	12	9	2	1	39	6	+33
(Iran) Jalal Cheraghpour	21 November 1982	28 November 1982	4	2	0	2	3	2	+1
(Iran) Mahmoud Yavari	7 August 1984	18 August 1984	6	6	0	0	22	2	+20
(Iran) Nasser Ebrahimi	1 December 1984	5 February 1985	9	3	4	2	10	8	+2
(Iran) Fereydoun Askarzadeh	16 February 1986	20 February 1986	2	2	0	0	4	0	+4
(Iran) Parviz Dehdari	28 May 1986	20 January 1989	18	8	6	4	29	11	+18
(Iran) Reza Vatankhah	23 February 1989	17 March 1989	3	3	0	0	6	1	+5
(Iran) Mehdi Monajati	30 May 1989	22 July 1989	3	2	0	1	6	4	+2
(Iran) Ali Parvin	1 November 1989	12 November 1989	5	1	3	1	5	4	+1
Total			62	36	15	11	124	38	+86

=== Opponents ===
Team	Pld	W	D	L	GF	GA	GD
Bangladesh	6	6	0	0	28	1	+27
China	6	2	2	2	8	8	0
Ghana	1	1	0	0	2	0	+2
Guinea	1	0	1	0	1	1	0
Hong Kong	1	1	0	0	2	0	+2
India	1	0	1	0	0	0	0
Indonesia	1	1	0	0	1	0	+1
Iraq	1	0	1	0	0	0	0
Japan	4	1	2	1	4	3	+2
Korea, North	4	3	1	0	7	2	+5
Korea, South	3	1	1	1	2	4	–2
Kuwait	5	0	1	4	2	6	–4
Nepal	3	3	0	0	13	0	+13
Oman	1	1	0	0	4	0	+4
Pakistan	2	2	0	0	3	0	+3
Philippines	1	1	0	0	7	1	+6
Qatar	1	1	0	0	2	0	+2
Russia	1	0	0	1	0	2	–2
Saudi Arabia	2	0	1	1	1	2	–1
Serbia	1	0	0	1	1	3	–2
Singapore	1	0	1	0	1	1	0
Syria	4	2	2	0	5	2	+3
Thailand	4	4	0	0	15	0	+15
Uganda	1	0	1	0	2	2	0
United Arab Emirates	4	4	0	0	9	0	+9
Yemen, South	2	2	0	0	4	0	+4
Total	62	36	15	11	124	38	+86
