= Iran at the AFC Asian Cup =

The Iran men's national football team has participated in 14 editions of the AFC Asian Cup, first appearing in the 1968 Asian Cup after automatically qualifying as hosts. Overall, Iran is one of the most successful teams in Asia, having won three titles from 1968 to 1976. However, after the 1976 Asian Cup, Iran's best performance is just third place.

== Overall results ==
AFC Asian Cup record											Qualification record					
Year	Round	Position	Pld	W	D	L	GF	GA	Squad	Manager(s)	Pld	W	D	L	GF	GA
(Hong Kong) 1956	Withdrew										Withdrew					
(South Korea) 1960	Did not qualify										6	3	1	2	12	10
(Israel) 1964	Withdrew										Withdrew					
(Iran) 1968	Champions	1st	4	4	0	0	11	2	Squad	Bayati	Qualified as hosts					
(Thailand) 1972	Champions	1st	5	5	0	0	12	4	Squad	Ranjbar	Qualified as champions					
(Iran) 1976	Champions	1st	4	4	0	0	13	0	Squad	Mohajerani	Qualified as hosts					
(Kuwait) 1980	Third place	3rd	6	3	2	1	16	6	Squad	Habibi	Qualified as champions					
(Singapore) 1984	Fourth place	4th	6	2	4	0	8	3	Squad	Ebrahimi	6	6	0	0	22	2
(Qatar) 1988	Third place	3rd	6	2	2	2	3	4	Squad	Dehdari	4	2	2	0	6	1
(Japan) 1992	Group stage	5th	3	1	1	1	2	1	Squad	Parvin	2	2	0	0	10	0
(United Arab Emirates) 1996	Third place	3rd	6	3	2	1	14	6	Squad	Mayelikohan	6	6	0	0	27	1
(Lebanon) 2000	Quarter-finals	6th	4	2	1	1	7	3	Squad	Talebi	6	4	1	1	16	2
(China) 2004	Third place	3rd	6	3	3	0	14	8	Squad	Ivanković	6	5	0	1	16	5
(Indonesia) (Malaysia) (Thailand) (Vietnam) 2007	Quarter-finals	6th	4	2	2	0	6	3	Squad	Ghalenoei	6	4	2	0	12	2
(Qatar) 2011	Quarter-finals	7th	4	3	0	1	6	2	Squad	Ghotbi	6	4	1	1	11	2
(Australia) 2015	Quarter-finals	6th	4	3	1	0	7	3	Squad	Queiroz	6	5	1	0	18	5
(United Arab Emirates) 2019	Semi-finals	3rd	6	4	1	1	12	3	Squad	Queiroz	8	6	2	0	26	3
(Qatar) 2023	Semi-finals	3rd	6	4	1	1	12	7	Squad	Ghalenoei	8	6	0	2	34	4
(Saudi Arabia) 2027	Qualified										6	4	2	0	16	4
Total	3 titles	16/19	74	45	20	9	143	55	—	—	76	57	12	7	226	41

== Head-to-head record ==
Opponent	Pld	W	D	L	GF	GA	GD	Win %
Bahrain	2	2	0	0	6	2	+4	100.00
Bangladesh	1	1	0	0	7	0	+7	100.00
Cambodia	2	2	0	0	4	1	+3	100.00
China	7	3	4	0	12	5	+7	42.86
Chinese Taipei	1	1	0	0	4	0	+4	100.00
Hong Kong	2	2	0	0	3	0	+3	100.00
India	1	0	1	0	0	0	+0	0.00
Iraq	7	4	2	1	12	6	+6	57.14
Israel	1	1	0	0	2	1	+1	100.00
Japan	5	1	2	2	2	5	−3	20.00
Kuwait	4	1	2	1	4	4	+0	25.00
Lebanon	1	1	0	0	4	0	+4	100.00
Malaysia	1	1	0	0	2	0	+2	100.00
Myanmar	1	1	0	0	3	1	+2	100.00
North Korea	4	4	0	0	9	2	+7	100.00
Oman	2	1	1	0	4	2	+2	50.00
Palestine	1	1	0	0	4	1	+3	100.00
Qatar	3	2	0	1	5	3	+2	66.67
Saudi Arabia	4	1	2	1	4	2	+2	25.00
Singapore	1	0	1	0	1	1	+0	0.00
South Korea	7	3	1	3	13	12	+1	42.86
South Yemen	1	1	0	0	8	0	+8	100.00
Syria	2	0	2	0	1	1	+0	0.00
Thailand	4	3	1	0	10	4	+6	75.00
United Arab Emirates	6	5	1	0	10	1	+9	83.33
Uzbekistan	1	1	0	0	2	1	+1	100.00
Vietnam	1	1	0	0	2	0	+2	100.00
Yemen	1	1	0	0	5	0	+5	100.00
Total (28)	74	45	20	9	143	55	+88	60.81

== 1968 Asian Cup ==
It was Iran's first ever Asian Cup debut, as they were awarded as host. Iran lifted the trophy for the first time.

Pos	Team	Pld	W	D	L	GF	GA	GD	Pts	Qualification
1	Iran (H)	4	4	0	0	11	2	+9	8	Champions
2	Burma	4	2	1	1	5	4	+1	5	Runners-up
3	Israel	4	2	0	2	11	5	+6	4	Third place
4	Republic of China	4	0	2	2	3	10	−7	2	Fourth place
5	Hong Kong	4	0	1	3	2	11	−9	1	Fifth place

Source: RSSSF
(H) Hosts
10 May 1968

Iran	2–0	Hong Kong
Behzadi 70'; Jabbari 88'

Amjadieh Stadium, Tehran
Attendance: 28,000
Referee: Norman Boswell (Malaysia)

13 May 1968

Iran	4–0	Taiwan
Behzadi 31'; Kalani 34'; Eftekhari 51'; Farzami 56'

Amjadieh Stadium, Tehran
Attendance: 30,000
Referee: Alex Joseph Vaz (India)

16 May 1968

Burma	1–3	Iran
Aung Khi 50'		Kalani 2'; Eftekhari 60'; Behzadi 71'

Amjadieh Stadium, Tehran
Attendance: 30,000
Referee: Natrajan (India)

19 May 1968

Iran	2–1	Israel
Behzadi 75'; Ghelichkhani 86'		Spiegel 56'

Amjadieh Stadium, Tehran
Attendance: 30,000
Referee: Alex Joseph Vaz (India)

== 1972 Asian Cup ==
=== Group allocation match ===
7 May 1972

Iran	2–0	Khmer Republic
Kalani 45'; Iranpak 51'

National Stadium, Bangkok
Attendance: 2,000
Referee: Kim Jo-Wong (South Korea)

=== Group A ===
Pos	Team	Pld	W	D	L	GF	GA	GD	Pts	Qualification
1	Iran	2	2	0	0	6	2	+4	4	Advance to Knockout stage
2	Thailand (H)	2	0	1	1	3	4	−1	1	Advance to Knockout stage
3	Iraq	2	0	1	1	1	4	−3	1	

Source: RSSSF
(H) Hosts
9 May 1972

Iran	3–0	Iraq
Kalani 34', 70', 78'

National Stadium, Bangkok
Attendance: 5,000
Referee: Sivapalan Kathiravale (Malaysia)

13 May 1972

Thailand	2–3	Iran
Tantariyanond 69', 70'		Jabbari 80', 86', 88'

National Stadium, Bangkok
Attendance: 25,000
Referee: Matolzi (Malaysia)

=== Semi-finals ===
16 May 1972

Iran	2–1	Khmer Republic
Iranpak 13'; Ghelichkhani 47'		Doeur Sokhom 18'

National Stadium, Bangkok
Attendance: 2,000
Referee: Matolozi (Malaysia)

=== Final ===
19 May 1972

Iran	2–1 (a.e.t.)	South Korea
Jabbari 48'; Kalani 108'		Park Lee-Chun 65'

National Stadium, Bangkok
Attendance: 15,000
Referee: Sivapalan Kathiravale (Malaysia)

== 1976 Asian Cup ==
=== Group B ===
Pos	Team	Pld	W	D	L	GF	GA	GD	Pts	Qualification
1	Iran (H)	2	2	0	0	10	0	+10	4	Advance to knockout stage
2	Iraq	2	1	0	1	1	2	−1	2	Advance to knockout stage
3	South Yemen	2	0	0	2	0	9	−9	0	

Source: RSSSF
(H) Hosts
4 June 1976

Iran	2–0	Iraq
Nouraei 45'; Roshan 58'

Aryamehr Stadium, Tehran
Attendance: 50,000
Referee: Marijan Raus (Yugoslavia)

8 June 1976

Iran	8–0	South Yemen
Azizi 17', 73'; Nouraei 40', 42'; Khorshidi 45'; Mazloumi 63', 74', 80'

Aryamehr Stadium, Tehran
Attendance: 10,000
Referee: Akram Ul Haq (India)

=== Semi-finals ===
11 June 1976

Iran	2–0 (a.e.t.)	China
Khorshidi 100'; Roshan 119'

Aryamehr Stadium, Tehran
Attendance: 60,000
Referee: Asami (Japan)

=== Final ===
13 June 1976

Iran	1–0	Kuwait
Parvin 71'

Aryamehr Stadium, Tehran
Attendance: 100,000
Referee: Jean Dubach (Switzerland)

It would have been the last time Iran has ever won the title, as for 2019. However, Iran holds record as the most consecutive champion, having won three strait titles comparing to Japan, Saudi Arabia and South Korea, bot have two strait titles.

== 1980 Asian Cup ==
=== Group A ===
Pos	Team	Pld	W	D	L	GF	GA	GD	Pts	Qualification
1	Iran	4	2	2	0	12	4	+8	6	Advance to knockout stage
2	North Korea	4	3	0	1	9	7	+2	6	Advance to knockout stage
3	Syria	4	2	1	1	3	2	+1	5	
4	China	4	1	1	2	9	5	+4	3	
5	Bangladesh	4	0	0	4	2	17	−15	0	

Source: RSSSF

17 September 1980

Iran	0–0	Syria

Sabah Al-Salem Stadium, Kuwait City
Attendance: 15,000

20 September 1980

China	2–2	Iran
Chen Jingang 74'; Xu Yonglai 89'		Alidousti 35'; Fariba 70'

Sabah Al-Salem Stadium, Kuwait City
Attendance: 10,000

22 September 1980

Bangladesh	0–7	Iran
		Fariba 11', 34', 80', 82'; Roshan 21'; Barzegari 27', 87'

Sabah Al-Salem Stadium, Kuwait City
Attendance: 2,000

24 September 1980

Iran	3–2	North Korea
Alidousti 27'; Danaeifard 57'; Fariba 60'		Hwang Sang-hoi 68'; Pak Jong-hun 90'

Sabah Al-Salem Stadium, Kuwait City
Attendance: 4,000
Referee: Enrique Mendoza (Mexico)

=== Semi-finals ===
28 September 1980

Iran	1–2	Kuwait
Faraki 90'		Yaqoub 63'; Al-Dakhil 85'

Sabah Al-Salem Stadium, Kuwait City
Attendance: 20,000
Referee: Kok Lee (Singapore)

=== Third place match ===
29 September 1980

Iran	3–0	North Korea
Fariba 49'; Faraki 66', 76'

Sabah Al-Salem Stadium, Kuwait City
Attendance: 10,000
Referee: Enrique Mendoza (Mexico)

== 1984 Asian Cup ==
=== Group B ===
Pos	Team	Pld	W	D	L	GF	GA	GD	Pts	Qualification
1	China	4	3	0	1	10	2	+8	6	Advance to knockout stage
2	Iran	4	2	2	0	6	1	+5	6	Advance to knockout stage
3	United Arab Emirates	4	2	0	2	3	8	−5	4	
4	Singapore (H)	4	1	1	2	3	4	−1	3	
5	India	4	0	1	3	0	7	−7	1	

Source: RSSSF
(H) Hosts
1 December 1984
21:00

Iran	3–0	United Arab Emirates
Alidousti 27'; Shahrokh Bayani 85' (pen.); Mohammadkhani 87'

National Stadium, Singapore
Attendance: 8,000
Referee: Toshikazu Sano (Japan)

3 December 1984
19:00

Iran	2–0	China
Mohammadkhani 57'; Arabshahi 69'

National Stadium, Singapore
Attendance: 19,000
Referee: George Courtney (England)

7 December 1984
19:00

Iran	0–0	India

National Stadium, Singapore
Attendance: 10,000
Referee: Koh Guan Kiat (Malaysia)

10 December 1984
19:00

Singapore	1–1	Iran
Saad 61'		Shahrokh Bayani 55' (pen.)

National Stadium, Singapore
Attendance: 2,000
Referee: Abu Wahid Shanbe (Oman)

=== Semi-finals ===
13 December 1984
20:00

Saudi Arabia	1 – 1 (a.e.t.)	Iran
Shahin Bayani 88' (o.g.)		Shahrokh Bayani 43'
Penalties
Abdullah (penalty scored); Abduljawad (penalty scored); Nu'eimeh (penalty scored); Al-Jam'an (penalty scored); Al-Musaibeah (penalty scored)	5 – 4	(penalty scored) Hajiloo; (penalty scored) Mokhtarifar; (penalty scored) Derakhshan; (penalty missed) Panjali; (penalty scored) Shahrokh Bayani

National Stadium, Singapore
Attendance: 20,000
Referee: George Courtney (England)

=== Third place match ===
16 December 1984
18:00

Iran	1 – 1	Kuwait
Mohammadkhani 80'		Al-Haddad 26'
Penalties
Hajiloo (penalty scored); Derakhshan (penalty scored); Ahadi (penalty scored); Mokhtarifar (penalty missed)	3 – 5	(penalty scored) Al-Dakhil; (penalty scored) Al-Suwayed; (penalty scored) Juma'a; (penalty scored) Al-Jasem; (penalty scored) Al-Qabendi

National Stadium, Singapore
Attendance: 26,000
Referee: Antonio Márquez (Mexico)

== 1988 Asian Cup ==
=== Group A ===
Pos	Team	Pld	W	D	L	GF	GA	GD	Pts	Qualification
1	South Korea	4	4	0	0	9	2	+7	8	Advance to knockout stage
2	Iran	4	2	1	1	3	3	0	5	Advance to knockout stage
3	Qatar (H)	4	2	0	2	7	6	+1	4	
4	United Arab Emirates	4	1	0	3	2	4	−2	2	
5	Japan	4	0	1	3	0	6	−6	1	

Source: RSSSF
(H) Hosts
2 December 1988
16:00

Iran	2–0	Qatar
Bavi 6'; Pious 89'	Report

Al-Ahly Stadium, Doha
Attendance: 20,000
Referee: Michel Vautrot (France)

4 December 1988
15:00

Japan	0–0	Iran
	Report

Qatar SC Stadium, Doha
Attendance: 4,000
Referee: Samuel Chan (Hong Kong)

8 December 1988
15:00

Iran	1–0	United Arab Emirates
Pious 27'	Report

Qatar SC Stadium, Doha
Attendance: 4,000
Referee: Steven Ovinis (Malaysia)

11 December 1988
17:00

South Korea	3–0	Iran
Byun Byung-Joo 26', 57'; Hwang Sun-Hong 42'	Report

Al-Ahly Stadium, Doha
Attendance: 5,000
Referee: Neji Jouini (Tunisia)

=== Semi-finals ===
15 December 1988
16:00

Saudi Arabia	1–0	Iran
Abdullah 16'	Report

Qatar SC Stadium, Doha
Attendance: 17,000
Referee: George Courtney (England)

=== Third place match ===
17 December 1988
16:00

China	0–0	Iran
	Report
Penalties
Duan Ju (penalty missed); Wang Baoshan (penalty missed); Wu Wenbing (penalty missed)	0–3	(penalty scored) Moharrami; (penalty scored) Ansarifard; (penalty scored) Ghayeghran

Al-Ahly Stadium, Doha
Attendance: 2,000
Referee: Ahmad Bash (Jordan)

== 1992 Asian Cup ==
The 1992 tournament was considered as the most disappointing tournament for Iran, after ended up in group stage and got eliminated for the first time in the history. It remains as the only time Iran failed to qualify from the group stage.

The last match between Japan and Iran has been a significant subject on the criticism. Iran came to the match with four points, an advantage comparing to its Japanese rival which was forced to gain a win after two draws. However, the match was marred with three red cards for the Iranian team, the first red card in early second half for Jamshid Shahmohammadi in 54' caused drain for the Iranian side when they played only with ten men. In 86', Kazuyoshi Miura scored the decisive goal for Japan that Iranian side had protested to be offside, but instead Nader Mohammadkhani and Farshad Pious were issued red card as well, thus Iran had to play entire of the last minutes with eight players, and eventually, lost 0–1 and eliminated from the competition; Japan went on to win its first Asian title, and marked the rise of Japan as an Asian football power. Many Iranian supporters have continued to hold the match as the biggest robbery in their football history.

=== Group A ===
Pos	Team	Pld	W	D	L	GF	GA	GD	Pts	Qualification
1	Japan (H)	3	1	2	0	2	1	+1	4	Advance to knockout stage
2	United Arab Emirates	3	1	2	0	2	1	+1	4	Advance to knockout stage
3	Iran	3	1	1	1	2	1	+1	3	
4	North Korea	3	0	1	2	2	5	−3	1	

Source: WorldFootball.net
(H) Hosts
30 October 1992
17:00

North Korea	0–2	Iran
	Report	Pious 30'; Ghayeghran 80'

Bingo Sports Park, Onomichi
Attendance: 8,000
Referee: Omer Al-Mehannah (Saudi Arabia)

1 November 1992
12:00

Iran	0–0	United Arab Emirates
	Report

Hiroshima Big Arch, Hiroshima
Attendance: 25,000
Referee: Jamal Al Sharif (Syria)

3 November 1992
14:00

Japan	1–0	Iran
Miura 87'	Report

Hiroshima Big Arch, Hiroshima
Attendance: 37,000
Referee: Jamal Al Sharif (Syria)

== 1996 Asian Cup ==
=== Group B ===
Pos	Team	Pld	W	D	L	GF	GA	GD	Pts	Qualification
1	Iran	3	2	0	1	7	3	+4	6	Advance to knockout stage
2	Saudi Arabia	3	2	0	1	7	3	+4	6	Advance to knockout stage
3	Iraq	3	2	0	1	6	3	+3	6	Advance to knockout stage
4	Thailand	3	0	0	3	2	13	−11	0	

Source: RSSSF

5 December 1996
19:00

Iran	1–2	Iraq
Daei 90' (pen.)	Report	Fawzi 37'; Sabbar 69'

Al-Maktoum Stadium, Dubai
Attendance: 15,000
Referee: Masayoshi Okada (Japan)

8 December 1996
19:00

Thailand	1–3	Iran
Senamuang 80'	Report	Saadavi 38'; Minavand 54'; Daei 70'

Al-Maktoum Stadium, Dubai
Attendance: 12,000
Referee: Lu Jun (China)

11 December 1996
16:45

Saudi Arabia	0–3	Iran
	Report	Daei 12'; Bagheri 37'; Azizi 47'

Al-Maktoum Stadium, Dubai
Attendance: 12,000
Referee: Masayoshi Okada (Japan)

=== Quarter-finals ===
16 December 1996
16:45

South Korea	2–6	Iran
Kim Do-Hoon 11'; Shin Tae-Yong 35'	Report	Bagheri 31'; Azizi 52'; Daei 66', 76', 83', 89' (pen.)

Al-Maktoum Stadium, Dubai
Attendance: 19,000
Referee: Jamal Al Sharif (Syria)

=== Semi-finals ===
19 December 1996
19:30

Iran	0–0 (a.e.t.)	Saudi Arabia
	Report
Penalties
Daei (penalty missed); Peyrovani (penalty scored); Yazdani (penalty missed); Estili (penalty scored); Bagheri (penalty scored); Khakpour (penalty missed)	3–4	(penalty missed) Al-Temawi; (penalty scored) Sulaimani; (penalty scored) Zubromawi; (penalty missed) Al-Muwallid; (penalty scored) Al-Harbi; (penalty scored) Madani

Sheikh Zayed Stadium, Abu Dhabi
Attendance: 35,000
Referee: Gamal Al-Ghandour (Egypt)

=== Third place match ===
21 December 1996
16:45

Iran	1–1	Kuwait
Daei 40'	Report	Al-Huwaidi 15'
Penalties
Moharrami (penalty missed); Estili (penalty scored); Peyrovani (penalty scored); Bagheri (penalty scored)	3–2	(penalty scored) Badr Haji; (penalty scored) Bashar Abdullah; (penalty missed) Al-Lenqawi; (penalty missed) Abdulrahman; (penalty missed) Al-Huwaidi

Sheikh Zayed Stadium, Abu Dhabi
Attendance: 60,000
Referee: Kim Young-Joo (Korea Republic)

== 2000 Asian Cup ==
=== Group A ===
Pos	Team	Pld	W	D	L	GF	GA	GD	Pts	Qualification
1	Iran	3	2	1	0	6	1	+5	7	Advance to knockout stage
2	Iraq	3	1	1	1	4	3	+1	4	Advance to knockout stage
3	Thailand	3	0	2	1	2	4	−2	2	
4	Lebanon (H)	3	0	2	1	3	7	−4	2	

Source: RSSSF
(H) Hosts
12 October 2000
20:45

Lebanon	0–4	Iran
	Report	Bagheri 19'; Estili 75', 87'; Daei 90+1'

Sports City Stadium, Beirut
Attendance: 52,418
Referee: Lu Jun (China)

15 October 2000
17:00

Iran	1–1	Thailand
Daei 73'	Report	Pituratana 12'

Sports City Stadium, Beirut
Attendance: 10,000
Referee: Saad Kamil Al-Fadhli (Kuwait)

18 October 2000
19:30

Iran	1–0	Iraq
Daei 77'	Report

Saida Municipal Stadium, Sidon
Attendance: 8,582
Referee: Omer Al-Mehannah (Saudi Arabia)

=== Quarter-finals ===
23 October 2000
16:45

Iran	1–2 (a.e.t.)	South Korea
Bagheri 71'	Report	Kim Sang-Sik 90'; Lee Dong-Gook 99'

International Olympic Stadium, Tripoli
Attendance: 5,000
Referee: Ali Bujsaim (UAE)

== 2004 Asian Cup ==
=== Group D ===
Pos	Team	Pld	W	D	L	GF	GA	GD	Pts	Qualification
1	Japan	3	2	1	0	5	1	+4	7	Advance to knockout stage
2	Iran	3	1	2	0	5	2	+3	5	Advance to knockout stage
3	Oman	3	1	1	1	4	3	+1	4	
4	Thailand	3	0	0	3	1	9	−8	0	

Source: RSSSF
20 July 2004
20:30

Iran	3–0	Thailand
Enayati 71'; Nekounam 80'; Daei 86' (pen.)	Report

Chongqing Olympic Sports Center, Chongqing
Attendance: 37,000
Referee: Mohammad Kousa (Syria)

24 July 2004
18:00

Oman	2–2	Iran
Al-Hosni 31', 40'	Report	Karimi 61'; Nosrati 90+4'

Chongqing Olympic Sports Center, Chongqing
Attendance: 35,000
Referee: Abdul Rahman Al-Delawar (Bahrain)

28 July 2004
18:15

Japan	0–0	Iran
	Report

Chongqing Olympic Sports Center, Chongqing
Attendance: 52,000
Referee: Mark Shield (Australia)

=== Quarter-finals ===
31 July 2004
21:00

South Korea	3–4	Iran
Seol Ki-Hyeon 16'; Lee Dong-Gook 25'; Kim Nam-Il 68'	Report	Karimi 10', 20', 77'; Park Jin-Seop 51' (o.g.)

Shandong Sports Center, Jinan
Attendance: 20,000
Referee: Saad Kamil Al-Fadhli (Kuwait)

=== Semi-finals ===
3 August 2004
21:00

China	1–1 (a.e.t.)	Iran
Shao Jiayi 18'	Report	Alavi 38'
Penalties
Zheng Zhi (penalty scored); Zhao Junzhe (penalty missed); Li Xiaopeng (penalty scored); Sun Xiang (penalty scored); Shao Jiayi (penalty scored)	4–3	(penalty scored) Daei; (penalty scored) Mahdavikia; (penalty scored) Nekounam; (penalty missed) Mobali; (penalty missed) Golmohammadi

Workers Stadium, Beijing
Attendance: 55,000
Referee: Talaat Najm (Lebanon)

=== Third place match ===
6 August 2004
20:00

Iran	4–2	Bahrain
Nekounam 9'; Karimi 52'; Daei 80' (pen.), 90'	Report	Yousef 48'; Farhan 57'

Workers Stadium, Beijing
Attendance: 10,000
Referee: Fareed Al-Marzouqi (UAE)

== 2007 Asian Cup ==
=== Group C ===
Pos	Team	Pld	W	D	L	GF	GA	GD	Pts	Qualification
1	Iran	3	2	1	0	6	3	+3	7	Advance to knockout stage
2	Uzbekistan	3	2	0	1	9	2	+7	6	Advance to knockout stage
3	China	3	1	1	1	7	6	+1	4	
4	Malaysia (H)	3	0	0	3	1	12	−11	0	

Source: Asian Cup 2007
Rules for classification: Tiebreakers
(H) Hosts
11 July 2007
18:15 UTC+8

Iran	2–1	Uzbekistan
Hosseini 55'; Kazemian 78'	Report	Rezaei 16' (o.g.)

Bukit Jalil Stadium, Kuala Lumpur
Attendance: 1,863
Referee: Saad Kamil Al-Fadhli (Kuwait)

15 July 2007
18:15 UTC+8

China	2–2	Iran
Shao Jiayi 7'; Mao Jianqing 33'	Report	Zandi 45+1'; Nekounam 74'

Bukit Jalil Stadium, Kuala Lumpur
Attendance: 5,938
Referee: Khalil Al-Ghamdi (Saudi Arabia)

18 July 2007
20:30 UTC+8

Malaysia	0–2	Iran
	Report	Nekounam 29' (pen.); Teymourian 77'

Bukit Jalil Stadium, Kuala Lumpur
Attendance: 4,520
Referee: Muhsen Basma (Syria)

=== Quarter-finals ===
22 July 2007
18:15 UTC+8

Iran	0–0 (a.e.t.)	South Korea
	Report
Penalties
Zandi (penalty scored); Mahdavikia (penalty missed); Enayati (penalty scored); Khatibi (penalty missed)	2–4	(penalty scored) Lee Chun-Soo; (penalty scored) Kim Sang-Sik; (penalty missed) Kim Do-Heon; (penalty scored) Cho Jae-Jin; (penalty scored) Kim Jung-Woo

Bukit Jalil Stadium, Kuala Lumpur
Attendance: 8,629
Referee: Ali Al-Badwawi (United Arab Emirates)

== 2011 Asian Cup ==
=== Group D ===
Pos	Team	Pld	W	D	L	GF	GA	GD	Pts	Qualification
1	Iran	3	3	0	0	6	1	+5	9	Advance to knockout stage
2	Iraq	3	2	0	1	3	2	+1	6	Advance to knockout stage
3	North Korea	3	0	1	2	0	2	−2	1	
4	United Arab Emirates	3	0	1	2	0	4	−4	1	

Source: AFC
Rules for classification: Tiebreakers

11 January 2011
Iraq	1–2	Iran
15 January 2011
Iran	1–0	North Korea
19 January 2011
United Arab Emirates	0–3	Iran

=== Quarter-finals ===
22 January 2011
19:30

Iran	0–1 (a.e.t.)	South Korea
	Report	Yoon Bit-Garam 105'

Qatar SC Stadium, Doha
Attendance: 7,111
Referee: Ravshan Irmatov (Uzbekistan)

== 2015 Asian Cup ==
=== Group C ===
Pos	Team	Pld	W	D	L	GF	GA	GD	Pts	Qualification
1	Iran	3	3	0	0	4	0	+4	9	Advance to knockout stage
2	United Arab Emirates	3	2	0	1	6	3	+3	6	Advance to knockout stage
3	Bahrain	3	1	0	2	3	5	−2	3	
4	Qatar	3	0	0	3	2	7	−5	0	

Source: Asian Cup Australia 2015
Rules for classification: Tiebreakers

11 January 2015
Iran	2–0	Bahrain	AAMI Park, Melbourne
15 January 2015
Qatar	0–1	Iran	Stadium Australia, Sydney
19 January 2015
Iran	1–0	United Arab Emirates	Brisbane Stadium, Brisbane

=== Quarter-finals ===
23 January 2015
17:30 AEDT (UTC+11)

Iran	3–3 (a.e.t.)	Iraq
Azmoun 24'; Pouraliganji 103'; Ghoochannejhad 119'	Report	Yasin 56'; Mahmoud 93'; Ismail 116' (pen.)
Penalties
Hajsafi (penalty missed); Pouraliganji (penalty scored); Nekounam (penalty scored); Hosseini (penalty scored); Ghafouri (penalty scored); Jahanbakhsh (penalty scored); Teymourian (penalty scored); Amiri (penalty missed)	6–7	(penalty missed) Abdul-Amir; (penalty scored) Salem; (penalty scored) Ismail; (penalty scored) Adnan; (penalty scored) Mahmoud; (penalty scored) Kasim; (penalty scored) Hussein; (penalty scored) Shaker

Canberra Stadium, Canberra
Attendance: 18,921
Referee: Ben Williams (Australia)

With a third straight defeat in the quarter-finals, Iran had failed to pass through the quarter-finals for three consecutive Asian Cup. Adding with the last time Iran crowned as champion in 1976, Iran had not won the Asian Cup for 43 years.

== 2019 Asian Cup ==
Ali Daei, former Iran's international, stated Iran would have to be more confident to win the Asian Cup and ended their 47 years in drought of the title, citing their 2018 World Cup participation as useful to help Iran.

=== Group D ===
Pos	Team	Pld	W	D	L	GF	GA	GD	Pts	Qualification
1	Iran	3	2	1	0	7	0	+7	7	Advance to knockout stage
2	Iraq	3	2	1	0	6	2	+4	7	Advance to knockout stage
3	Vietnam	3	1	0	2	4	5	−1	3	Advance to knockout stage
4	Yemen	3	0	0	3	0	10	−10	0	

Source: AFC
Rules for classification: Group stage tiebreakers
7 January 2019
20:00

Iran	5–0	Yemen
Taremi 12', 25'; Dejagah 23'; Azmoun 53'; Ghoddos 78'	Report

Mohammed bin Zayed Stadium, Abu Dhabi
Attendance: 5,301
Referee: Ryuji Sato (Japan)

12 January 2019
15:00

Vietnam	0–2	Iran
	Report	Azmoun 38', 69'

Al Nahyan Stadium, Abu Dhabi
Attendance: 10,841
Referee: Muhammad Taqi (Singapore)

16 January 2019
20:00

Iran	0–0	Iraq
	Report

Al Maktoum Stadium, Dubai
Attendance: 15,038
Referee: Ravshan Irmatov (Uzbekistan)

=== Round of 16 ===
20 January 2019
21:00

Iran	2–0	Oman
Jahanbakhsh 32'; Dejagah 41' (pen.)	Report

Mohammed bin Zayed Stadium, Abu Dhabi
Attendance: 31,945
Referee: César Ramos (Mexico)

=== Quarter-finals ===
24 January 2019
20:00

China	0–3	Iran
	Report	Taremi 18'; Azmoun 31'; Ansarifard 90+1'

Mohammed bin Zayed Stadium, Abu Dhabi
Attendance: 19,578
Referee: Abdulrahman Al-Jassim (Qatar)

=== Semi-finals ===
28 January 2019
18:00

Iran	0–3	Japan
	Report	Osako 56', 67' (pen.); Haraguchi 90+1'

Hazza bin Zayed Stadium, Al Ain
Attendance: 23,262
Referee: Chris Beath (Australia)

== 2023 Asian Cup ==
=== Group C ===
Pos	Team	Pld	W	D	L	GF	GA	GD	Pts	Qualification
1	Iran	3	3	0	0	7	2	+5	9	Advance to knockout stage
2	United Arab Emirates	3	1	1	1	5	4	+1	4	Advance to knockout stage
3	Palestine	3	1	1	1	5	5	0	4	Advance to knockout stage
4	Hong Kong	3	0	0	3	1	7	−6	0	

Source: AFC
Rules for classification: Group stage tiebreakers
14 January 2024
20:30

Iran	4–1	Palestine
Ansarifard 2'; Khalilzadeh 12'; Ghayedi 38'; Azmoun 55'	Report	Seyam 45+6'

Education City Stadium, Al Rayyan
Attendance: 27,691
Referee: Abdulrahman Al-Jassim (Qatar)

19 January 2024
20:30

Hong Kong	0–1	Iran
	Report	Ghayedi 24'

Khalifa International Stadium, Al Rayyan
Attendance: 36,412
Referee: Hanna Hattab (Syria)

23 January 2024
18:00

Iran	2–1	United Arab Emirates
Taremi 26', 65'	Report	Al-Ghassani 90+3'

Education City Stadium, Al Rayyan
Attendance: 34,259
Referee: Ilgiz Tantashev (Uzbekistan)

=== Knockout stage ===
==== Round of 16 ====
31 January 2024
19:00

Iran	1–1 (a.e.t.)	Syria
Taremi 34' (pen.)	Report	Khribin 64' (pen.)
Penalties
Ansarifard (penalty scored); Rezaeian (penalty scored); Ebrahimi (penalty scored); Torabi (penalty scored); Hajsafi (penalty scored)	5–3	(penalty scored) Sabbag; (penalty missed) Youssef; (penalty scored) Ousou; (penalty scored) Al Dali

Abdullah bin Khalifa Stadium, Doha
Attendance: 8,720
Referee: Kim Jong-hyeok (South Korea)

==== Quarter-finals ====
3 February 2024
14:30

Iran	2–1	Japan
Mohebi 55'; Jahanbakhsh 90+6' (pen.)	Report	Morita 28'

Education City Stadium, Al Rayyan
Attendance: 35,640
Referee: Ma Ning (China)

==== Semi-finals ====
7 February 2024
18:00

Iran	2–3	Qatar
Azmoun 4'; Jahanbakhsh 51' (pen.)	Report	Gaber 17'; Afif 43'; Ali 82'

Al Thumama Stadium, Doha
Attendance: 40,342
Referee: Ahmad Al-Ali (Kuwait)

== 2027 Asian Cup ==
=== Group C ===
Pos	Team	Pld	W	D	L	GF	GA	GD	Pts	Qualification
1	Iran	0	0	0	0	0	0	0	0	Advance to knockout stage
2	Syria	0	0	0	0	0	0	0	0	Advance to knockout stage
3	Kyrgyzstan	0	0	0	0	0	0	0	0	Possible knockout stage based on ranking
4	China	0	0	0	0	0	0	0	0	

First match(es) will be played: January 2027. Source: AFC
9 January 2027

Syria	Match 5	Kyrgyzstan

King Fahd Sports City Stadium, Riyadh
9 January 2027

Iran	Match 6	China

Kingdom Arena, Riyadh

13 January 2027

Kyrgyzstan	Match 16	Iran

Al Shabab Stadium, Riyadh
14 January 2027

China	Match 20	Syria

Prince Abdullah Al Faisal Sports City Stadium, Jeddah

18 January 2027

Iran	Match 29	Syria

King Fahd Sports City Stadium, Riyadh
18 January 2027

Kyrgyzstan	Match 30	China

Kingdom Arena, Riyadh

== See also ==
- Iran at the FIFA World Cup
- Iranian football clubs in the AFC Champions League
- AFC Champions League clubs performance comparison
