= Football at the 1986 Asian Games =

- Dates: 20 September – 5 October
- Nations: 18

Medalists
gold medal	South Korea
silver medal	Saudi Arabia
bronze medal	Kuwait

Football was contested as part of the programme for the 1986 Asian Games which was hosted in Seoul, South Korea from 20 September to 2 October 1986. It was the 10th edition of the men's football tournament at the multi-sport event organised by the Olympic Council of Asia.

The football tournament began with the first matches of the group stage on 20 September 1986 and ended with the gold medal match on 5 October 1986. Hosts South Korea and Saudi Arabia contested the final. Goals from Cho Kwang-rae and Byun Byung-joo helped South Korea defeat Saudi Arabia 2–0 to win the gold medal. In the bronze medal match, Kuwait defeated Indonesia 5–0.

== Background ==
Football had been part of the Asian Games programme following the debut of the men's competition at the inaugural 1951 Asian Games in India.

Burma, India, South Korea and Taiwan held the record for gold medals having each won the football tournament twice. However, South Korea had never before won the gold medal outright having twice shared the title. Iraq were the defending champions after defeating Kuwait 1–0 in the final at the 1982 Asian Games in India.

== Format ==
In total, 18 teams took part in the competition. They were drawn into four single round robin groups – two of four teams and two of five teams. The group winners and runners-up would then contest the quarter-finals. The winners of the quarter-finals would contest the semi-finals which would decide which teams contested the gold and bronze medal matches.

=== Participants ===
- Bahrain
- Bangladesh
- China
- India
- Indonesia
- Iran
- Iraq
- Japan
- Kuwait
- Malaysia
- Nepal
- Oman
- Pakistan
- Qatar
- Saudi Arabia
- South Korea
- Thailand
- United Arab Emirates

== Venues ==
Matches were played at five venues across South Korea including the Olympic Stadium in Seoul, Busan Stadium in Busan, Daegu Stadium in Daegu, Daejeon Stadium in Daejeon and Gwangju Stadium in Gwangju.

Seoul	Busan	
Olympic Stadium	Busan Stadium	
Capacity: 69,950	Capacity: 30,000	
Daegu	Daejeon	Gwangju
Daegu Stadium	Daejeon Stadium	Gwangju Stadium
Capacity: 23,278	Capacity: 30,000	Capacity: 30,000
Football at the 1986 Asian Games is located in South Korea

== Group stage ==
=== Group A ===
The United Arab Emirates and Iraq advanced to the quarter-finals.

==== Table ====
Pos	Team	Pld	W	D	L	GF	GA	GD	Pts	Qualification
1	United Arab Emirates	4	3	1	0	5	2	+3	7	Qualification for the quarter-finals
2	Iraq	4	3	0	1	12	4	+8	6	Qualification for the quarter-finals
3	Oman	4	1	2	1	3	5	−2	4	
4	Thailand	4	1	1	2	8	4	+4	3	
5	Pakistan	4	0	0	4	2	15	−13	0	

==== Matches ====
21 September 1986

Iraq	4–0	Oman
Allawi (x2); Saeed; Radhi

Daegu Stadium, Daegu
21 September 1986

United Arab Emirates	1–0	Pakistan

Daegu Stadium, Daegu

23 September 1986

United Arab Emirates	2–1	Thailand
Unknown (x2)		Piyapong

Daegu Stadium, Daegu
23 September 1986

Pakistan	1–5	Iraq
Unknown		Hameed (x2); Mohammed (x2); Radhi

Daegu Stadium, Daegu

25 September 1986

Thailand	0–0	Oman

Daegu Stadium, Daegu
25 September 1986

United Arab Emirates	2–1	Iraq
Unknown (x2)		Saeed

Daegu Stadium, Daegu

27 September 1986

Oman	3–1	Pakistan

Daegu Stadium, Daegu
27 September 1986

Thailand	1–2	Iraq
Unknown		Dirjal; Mohammed

Daegu Stadium, Daegu

29 September 1986

United Arab Emirates	0–0	Oman

Daegu Stadium, Daegu
29 September 1986

Thailand	6–0	Pakistan
Pue-on (x3); Unknown (x3)

Daegu Stadium, Daegu

=== Group B ===
South Korea and China advanced to the quarter-finals.

==== Table ====
Pos	Team	Pld	W	D	L	GF	GA	GD	Pts	Qualification
1	South Korea	3	2	1	0	7	2	+5	5	Qualification for the quarter-finals
2	China	3	2	0	1	9	6	+3	4	Qualification for the quarter-finals
3	Bahrain	3	1	1	1	4	5	−1	3	
4	India	3	0	0	3	1	8	−7	0	

==== Matches ====
20 September 1986

South Korea	3–0	India
Noh Soo-jin 10'; Choi Soon-ho 36'; Park Chang-sun 84' (pen.)

Gudeok Stadium, Busan
20 September 1986

China	5–1	Bahrain
Ma Lin 21', 32'; Liu Haiguang 43'; Liu Zhongchang 80'; Qin Guorong 82'		Bushagor 11'

Gudeok Stadium, Busan

22 September 1986

China	2–1	India
Ma Lin 22', 25'		Mishra 37'

Gudeok Stadium, Busan

24 September 1986

South Korea	0–0	Bahrain

Gudeok Stadium, Busan

26 September 1986

Bahrain	3–0	India

Gudeok Stadium, Busan

28 September 1986

South Korea	4–2	China
Park Chang-sun 20' (pen.); Kim Joo-sung 47'; Lee Tae-ho 75'; Cho Min-kook 77'		Li Hui 26' (pen.), 90' (pen.)

Gudeok Stadium, Busan

=== Group C ===
Saudi Arabia and Indonesia advanced to the quarter-finals.

==== Table ====
Pos	Team	Pld	W	D	L	GF	GA	GD	Pts	Qualification
1	Saudi Arabia	3	3	0	0	6	1	+5	6	Qualification for the quarter-finals
2	Indonesia	3	1	1	1	2	3	−1	3	Qualification for the quarter-finals
3	Qatar	3	0	2	1	2	3	−1	2	
4	Malaysia	3	0	1	2	2	5	−3	1	

==== Matches ====
21 September 1986

Malaysia	1–3	Saudi Arabia
Wong Hung Nung 12'		Al-Shahrani 28'; Abdullah 30', 53'

Gwangju Stadium, Gwangju
21 September 1986

Qatar	1–1	Indonesia
Unknown		Kabo

Gwangju Stadium, Gwangju

23 September 1986

Qatar	1–1	Malaysia
Al-Sowaidi 90'		Ahmad 33'

Gwangju Stadium, Gwangju

25 September 1986

Indonesia	0–2	Saudi Arabia

Gwangju Stadium, Gwangju

27 September 1986

Indonesia	1–0	Malaysia
Sawor 35'

Gwangju Stadium, Gwangju

29 September 1986

Qatar	0–1	Saudi Arabia

Gwangju Stadium, Gwangju

=== Group D ===
Kuwait and Iran advanced to the quarter-finals.

==== Table ====
Pos	Team	Pld	W	D	L	GF	GA	GD	Pts	Qualification
1	Kuwait	4	4	0	0	12	0	+12	8	Qualification for the quarter-finals
2	Iran	4	3	0	1	12	1	+11	6	Qualification for the quarter-finals
3	Japan	4	2	0	2	9	4	+5	4	
4	Bangladesh	4	1	0	3	1	12	−11	2	
5	Nepal	4	0	0	4	0	17	−17	0	

==== Matches ====
20 September 1986

Kuwait	4–0	Bangladesh

Daejeon Stadium, Daejeon
20 September 1986

Japan	5–0	Nepal
Tsunami 8'; Hara 17', 39'; Kimura 25', 29' (pen.)

Daejeon Stadium, Daejeon

22 September 1986

Japan	0–2	Iran
		Abtahi 5'; Mohammadkhani 17'

Daejeon Stadium, Daejeon
Attendance: 30,000
Referee: Abdullah Al-Nasir (Saudi Arabia)
22 September 1986

Nepal	0–5	Kuwait
		Al-Hasawi (x2); Unknown (x3)

Daejeon Stadium, Daejeon

24 September 1986

Iran	4–0	Bangladesh
Pious 61'; Fathabadi 82', 89'; Ghayeghran 90'

Daejeon Stadium, Daejeon
Attendance: 7,000
Referee: Lee Do-ha (South Korea)
24 September 1986

Japan	0–2	Kuwait
		Al-Suwayed 24'; Al-Zanki 72'

Daejeon Stadium, Daejeon

26 September 1986

Nepal	0–1	Bangladesh
		Aslam 48'

Daejeon Stadium, Daejeon
26 September 1986

Iran	0–1	Kuwait
		Al-Hasawi 18'

Daejeon Stadium, Daejeon
Attendance: 30,000
Referee: Abdullah Al-Nasir (Saudi Arabia)

28 September 1986

Japan	4–0	Bangladesh
Hara 1', 71'; Johnny 56' (o.g.); Tsunami 78'

Daejeon Stadium, Daejeon
28 September 1986

Iran	6–0	Nepal
Derakhshan 8', 76'; Bayani 44' (pen.); Fathabadi 51', 86'; Yekkeh 61'

Daejeon Stadium, Daejeon
Attendance: 19,892
Referee: Ahmed Ali (Pakistan)

== Knockout stage ==
=== Quarter-finals ===
All four quarter-finals ended as draws after extra time and were decided on penalties. Saudi Arabia, South Korea, Indonesia and Kuwait advanced to the semi-finals.

1 October 1986

Saudi Arabia	1–1 (a.e.t.)	Iraq
Unknown		Mohammed
Penalties
	9–8

Olympic Stadium, Seoul

1 October 1986

South Korea	1–1 (a.e.t.)	Iran
Park Chang-sun 34' (pen.)		Bavi 84'
Penalties
Park Chang-sun (penalty scored); Kim Joo-sung (penalty scored); Choi Soon-ho (penalty scored); Cho Young-jeung (penalty scored); Lee Tae-ho (penalty scored)	5–4	(penalty scored) Ghayeghran; (penalty scored) Changiz; (penalty scored) Namjoo-Motlagh; (penalty missed) Mohammadkhani; (penalty scored) Hajiloo

Gudeok Stadium, Busan
Attendance: 30,000
Referee: Ahmed Jassim (Bahrain)

1 October 1986

United Arab Emirates	2–2 (a.e.t.)	Indonesia
Unknown (x2)		Yacob 49'; Unknown (o.g.)
Penalties
	3–4

Olympic Stadium, Seoul

1 October 1986

Kuwait	1–1 (a.e.t.)	China
Al-Suwayed 39'		Al-Sharidah 37' (o.g.)
Penalties
	5–4

Gudeok Stadium, Busan

=== Semi-finals ===
South Korea defeated Indonesia and Saudi Arabia defeated Kuwait on penalties to advance to the gold medal match.

3 October 1986

South Korea	4–0	Indonesia
Cho Kwang-rae 29'; Choi Soon-ho 52', 75'; Lee Tae-ho 67'

Olympic Stadium, Seoul

3 October 1986

Saudi Arabia	2–2 (a.e.t.)	Kuwait
Penalties
	5–4

== Bronze medal match ==
Kuwait defeated Indonesia to win the bronze medal.

4 October 1986

Indonesia	0–5	Kuwait

Olympic Stadium, Seoul

== Gold medal match ==
Goals from Cho Kwang-rae and Byun Byung-joo helped South Korea defeat Saudi Arabia 2–0 to win the gold medal.

5 October 1986

South Korea	2–0	Saudi Arabia
Cho Kwang-rae 7'; Byun Byung-joo 84'

Olympic Stadium, Seoul
