= Park Jong-hun =

Park Jong-hun or Pak Jong-hun (박종훈) may refer to:

- Pak Jong-hun (박정훈; born 1948), North Korean footballer
- Park Jong-hoon (born 1965), South Korean gymnast
- Park Jong-hun (baseball), South Korean baseball player

== See also ==
- Park Jeong-hun (disambiguation) (박정훈)
