= Alidoosti =

Alidoosti is a surname. Notable people with the surname include:

- Hamid Alidoosti (born 1956), Iranian football coach and former player
- Taraneh Alidoosti (born 1984), Iranian actress
