= 1980 AFC Asian Cup =

كأس آسيا 1980

Tournament details
- Host country: Kuwait
- Dates: 15–30 September
- Teams: 10
- Venue: 1 (in 1 host city)

Final positions
- Champions: Kuwait (1st title)
- Runners-up: South Korea
- Third place: Iran
- Fourth place: North Korea

Tournament statistics
- Matches played: 24
- Goals scored: 76 (3.17 per match)
- Attendance: 169,200 (7,050 per match)
- Top scorer(s): (Iran) Behtash Fariba (South Korea) Choi Soon-ho (7 goals each)

The 1980 AFC Asian Cup (Standard Arabic: كأس آسيا 1980) was the seventh international association football championship for members of the Asian Football Confederation (AFC). Hosted by Kuwait, the competition ran from 15 to 30 September 1980 and was contested by the national teams of Bangladesh, China, Iran, Kuwait, Malaysia, North Korea, Qatar, South Korea, Syria and the United Arab Emirates.

During the competition, the Iraqi invasion of Iran began and the effects of the subsequent war impacted the morale of Iranian team. Three-time defending champions Iran were defeated by hosts Kuwait in the semi-finals. The final was contested by Kuwait and South Korea. Goals from Saad Al-Houti and Faisal Al-Dakhil saw Kuwait run out 3–0 winners as they won the competition for the first time.

== Background ==
The inaugural AFC Asian Cup was held in Hong Kong in 1956. Iran were three-time defending champions after winning all four of their matches in the round-robin tournament in 1968, defeating South Korea 2–1 in the final in 1972 and Kuwait 1–0 in the final in 1976. Iran were also the most successful team in the history of the competition, having won the title three times previously.

== Qualification ==
Kuwait qualified automatically as hosts and Iran qualified automatically as holders. In total, 31 teams were included in the qualifying draw but 13 would withdraw without playing a match.

The teams were split geographically into four qualifying groups of various sizes. Syria and the United Arab Emirates qualified as the winners and runners-up respectively of group one. In group two, Qatar and Bangladesh qualified as group winners and runners-up respectively. North Korea and Malaysia qualified as group winners and runners-up respectively of group three. South Korea and China qualified from group four as group winners and runners-up respectively.

=== Participants ===
Nations qualified for the 1980 AFC Asian Cup
Team	Qualified as	Qualified on	Previous appearance
Kuwait	Hosts	N/A	2 (1972, 1976)
Iran	1976 AFC Asian Cup champions	13 June 1976	3 (1968, 1972, 1976)
Syria	Group 1 winners	22 November 1979	0 (debut)
United Arab Emirates	Group 1 runners-up	23 November 1979	0 (debut)
Qatar	Group 2 winners	15 January 1979	0 (debut)
Bangladesh	Group 2 runners-up	16 January 1979	0 (debut)
North Korea	Group 3 winners	12 May 1979	0 (debut)
Malaysia	Group 3 runners-up	11 May 1979	1 (1976)
South Korea	Group 4 winners	29 December 1978	4 (1956, 1960, 1964, 1972)
China	Group 4 runners-up	29 December 1978	1 (1976)

== Format ==
The 10 teams were drawn into two single round robin groups of five teams. The group winners and runners-up would contest the semi-finals which would decide the teams contesting the final and the third-place play-off.

== Venue ==
All matches were played at the Sabah Al-Salem Stadium in Kuwait City.

Kuwait City is located in Kuwait	Kuwait City
Kuwait City is located in Kuwait	Sabah Al-Salem Stadium
Kuwait City is located in Kuwait	Capacity: 22,000

== Summary ==
The competition began on 15 September 1980 when hosts Kuwait drew 1–1 with the United Arab Emirates in the opening match. Iran and South Korea recorded undefeated campaigns in the group stage as they finished first in their respective groups. After winning their final group stage matches, North Korea and Kuwait advanced to the semi-finals as group runners-up.

The semi-finals took place on 28 September. Goals from Jasem Yaqoub and Faisal Al-Dakhil helped Kuwait to a 2–1 win against three-time defending champions Iran – the nation's first Asian Cup defeat. In the other semi-final, Chung Hae-won scored twice as South Korea defeated rivals North Korea by the same scoreline.

Behtash Fariba scored once and Hossein Faraki scored twice as Iran defeated North Korea 3–0 in the third-place play-off the following day. The final took place on 30 September. Saad Al-Houti gave Kuwait an early lead before Faisal Al-Dakhil scored a brace to seal a 3–0 win for Kuwait against South Korea as they won the competition.

=== Impact of the Iran-Iraq war ===
A week into the competition, Iraq launched an invasion of Iran. The news of the invasion affected the morale of the Iranian team but they defeated North Korea 3–2 in their first match after the invasion to secure their passage to the semi-finals. Kuwait backed Iraq and supported the invasion so pro-Iraq propaganda was broadcast on state TV. As a result, Iran were in a state of disarray ahead of their semi-final with Kuwait and ended up narrowly losing the match.

== Group stage ==
=== Group A ===
Iran and North Korea advanced to the semi-finals.

==== Table ====
Pos	Team	Pld	W	D	L	GF	GA	GD	Pts	Qualification
1	Iran	4	2	2	0	12	4	+8	6	Advance to semi-finals
2	North Korea	4	3	0	1	9	7	+2	6	Advance to semi-finals
3	Syria	4	2	1	1	3	2	+1	5	
4	China	4	1	1	2	9	5	+4	3	
5	Bangladesh	4	0	0	4	2	17	−15	0	

==== Matches ====
16 September 1980

North Korea	3–2	Bangladesh
Choi Jae-pil 42', 44'; Kim Jong-man 85'		Salahuddin 60' (pen.); Chunnu 88'

Sabah Al-Salem Stadium, Kuwait City
Attendance: 200

17 September 1980

Iran	0–0	Syria

Sabah Al-Salem Stadium, Kuwait City
Attendance: 15,000

18 September 1980

North Korea	2–1	China
Kim Bok-man 19'; O Yung-su 63'		Li Fubao 8'

Sabah Al-Salem Stadium, Kuwait City
Attendance: 1,000

19 September 1980

Bangladesh	0–1	Syria
		Keshek 7'

Sabah Al-Salem Stadium, Kuwait City
Attendance: 1,500

20 September 1980

Iran	2–2	China
Alidoosti 25'; Fariba 55'		Chen Jingang 75'; Cai Jinbiao 90'

Sabah Al-Salem Stadium, Kuwait City
Attendance: 10,000

22 September 1980

Iran	7–0	Bangladesh
Fariba 10', 35', 54', 68'; Roshan 18'; Barzegari 28', 75'

Sabah Al-Salem Stadium, Kuwait City
Attendance: 2,000

23 September 1980

Syria	1–0	China
Keshek 85'

Sabah Al-Salem Stadium, Kuwait City
Attendance: 3,000

24 September 1980

Iran	3–2	North Korea
Alidoosti 27'; Danaeifard 57'; Fariba 59'		Jong Won-song 67'; Pak Jong-hun 85'

Sabah Al-Salem Stadium, Kuwait City
Attendance: 4,000
Referee: Enrique Mendoza (Mexico)

25 September 1980

China	6–0	Bangladesh
Shen Xiangfu 34', 45', 88'; Xu Yonglai 40', 63', 83'

Sabah Al-Salem Stadium, Kuwait City
Attendance: 500

26 September 1980

North Korea	2–1	Syria
O Yung-su 25'; Kim Gwang-un 61'		Suleiman 64'

Sabah Al-Salem Stadium, Kuwait City
Attendance: 2,000

=== Group B ===
South Korea and Kuwait advanced to the semi-finals.

==== Table ====
Pos	Team	Pld	W	D	L	GF	GA	GD	Pts	Qualification
1	South Korea	4	3	1	0	10	2	+8	7	Advance to semi-finals
2	Kuwait	4	2	1	1	8	5	+3	5	Advance to semi-finals
3	Malaysia	4	1	2	1	5	5	0	4	
4	Qatar	4	1	1	2	3	8	−5	3	
5	United Arab Emirates	4	0	1	3	3	9	−6	1	

==== Matches ====
15 September 1980

United Arab Emirates	1–1	Kuwait
Chombi 38'		Al-Houti 17'

Sabah Al-Salem Stadium, Kuwait City
Attendance: 18,000

16 September 1980
18:30

South Korea	1–1	Malaysia
Choi Soon-ho 68'		Hamzah 90'

Sabah Al-Salem Stadium, Kuwait City
Attendance: 5,000
Referee: Sudarso Hardjowasito (Indonesia)

17 September 1980

Qatar	2–1	United Arab Emirates
Muftah 4', 15'		Al-Hajri 13'

Sabah Al-Salem Stadium, Kuwait City
Attendance: 3,000

18 September 1980

Kuwait	3–1	Malaysia
Kameel 16'; Yaqoub 53' (pen.), 75' (pen.)		Hamzah 43'

Sabah Al-Salem Stadium, Kuwait City
Attendance: 20,000

19 September 1980
18:30

Qatar	0–2	South Korea
		Lee Jung-il 5'; Choi Soon-ho 22'

Sabah Al-Salem Stadium, Kuwait City
Attendance: 9,000
Referee: Vichai Charupunt (Thailand)

20 September 1980

Malaysia	2–0	United Arab Emirates
Alif 32'; Bahari 90'

Sabah Al-Salem Stadium, Kuwait City
Attendance: 3,000

21 September 1980
16:30

Kuwait	0–3	South Korea
		Hwang Seok-keun 48'; Choi Soon-ho 73', 80'

Sabah Al-Salem Stadium, Kuwait City
Attendance: 20,000
Referee: Toshikazu Sano (Japan)

23 September 1980

Malaysia	1–1	Qatar
Bahari 20'		Muftah 52'

Sabah Al-Salem Stadium, Kuwait City
Attendance: 1,000

24 September 1980
18:30

South Korea	4–1	United Arab Emirates
Choi Soon-ho 27', 50', 78' (pen.); Chung Hae-won 85'		Chombi 81'

Sabah Al-Salem Stadium, Kuwait City
Attendance: 4,000
Referee: Melvyn Victor D’Souza (India)

25 September 1980

Kuwait	4–0	Qatar
Al-Dakhil 23', 57'; Yaqoub 49' (pen.); Al-Anberi 66'

Sabah Al-Salem Stadium, Kuwait City
Attendance: 20,000

== Semi-finals ==
Kuwait defeated Iran and South Korea defeated North Korea to advance to the final.

28 September 1980

Iran	1–2	Kuwait
Faraki 90+2'		Yaqoub 63'; Al-Dakhil 85'

Sabah Al-Salem Stadium, Kuwait City
Attendance: 20,000
Referee: Lee Kok Seng (Singapore)

28 September 1980
19:30

South Korea	2–1	North Korea
Chung Hae-won 52', 75'		Pak Jong-hun 19' (pen.)

Sabah Al-Salem Stadium, Kuwait City
Attendance: 20,000
Referee: Toshikazu Sano (Japan)

== Third-place play-off ==
Goals from Behtash Fariba and Hossein Faraki helped Iran to a 3–0 win against North Korea as they finished third.

29 September 1980

Iran	3–0	North Korea
Fariba 48'; Faraki 66', 69'

Sabah Al-Salem Stadium, Kuwait City
Attendance: 10,000
Referee: Enrique Mendoza (Mexico)

== Final ==
Goals from Saad Al-Houti and Faisal Al-Dakhil helped Kuwait to a 3–0 win against South Korea as they won the tournament.

30 September 1980
18:30

Kuwait	3–0	South Korea
Al-Houti 8'; Al-Dakhil 34', 68'

Sabah Al-Salem Stadium, Kuwait City
Attendance: 25,000
Referee: Sudarso Hardjowasito (Indonesia)
