= Shahla Jahed =

Iranian suspected murderer (1969–2010)

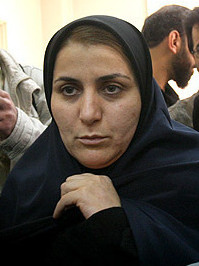
- Shahla Jahed (2009)
- Born: Khadijeh Shahla Jahed; 10 May 1969; Tehran, Iran
- Died: 1 December 2010 (aged 41); Tehran, Iran
- Occupation: Nurse
- Partner: Nasser Mohammadkhani (1999–2001)

Khadijeh Shahla Jahed (10 May 1969 – 1 December 2010) was an Iranian nurse who was sentenced to death for her involvement in the murder of her boyfriend's wife. She was hanged on 1 December 2010, being the 146th person to be executed in Iran in that year.

== Case and sentencing ==
Jahed had been living with Nasser Mohammadkhani, an Iranian footballer becoming his mistress in a temporary marriage. Jahed was arrested and charged for the 9 October 2002 murder of Laleh Saharkhizan, Mohammadkhani's wife. Mohammadkhani was in Germany when the killing happened, but it emerged later that he was "temporarily married" to Jahed, a practice allowed under Shia Islam.

Jahed was tried and sentenced to death in June 2004. The footballer Mohammadkhani first faced charges of adultery. These were later dropped, and he was sentenced to 74 lashes for taking drugs after the court heard he had smoked opium with Jahed. In 2008, the then chief of Iran's judiciary, Mahmoud Hashemi Shahroudi, ordered a fresh investigation and did not sanction her execution ruling that her initial conviction (based as it was on a confession she made under duress) was unacceptable.

== Execution ==
International human rights groups had campaigned for her release as she had already been jailed for more than eight years. One day prior to the execution, Amnesty International made a last-minute appeal for the execution to be halted, saying Jahed had not received a fair trial. Iranian courts halted the execution of Shahla Jahed when the case of Sakineh Mohammadi Ashtiani became public.

Jahed was executed on 1 December 2010 at 5am local time at the Evin Prison, north of Tehran. The victim's brother was allowed to pull the stool from under her feet.
