= Iran at the FIFA World Cup =

International football delegation

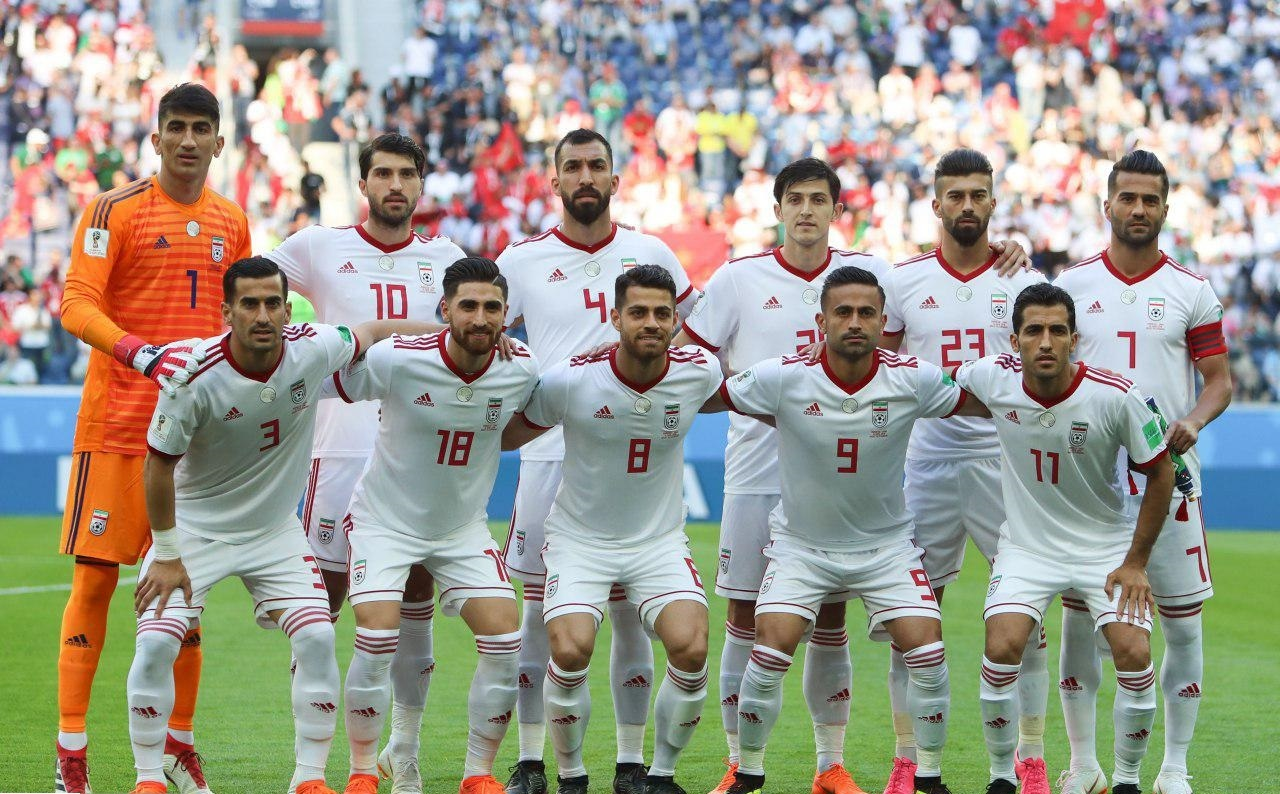
Iran national football team at the 2018 FIFA World Cup in Russia

Iran have appeared in the FIFA World Cup on seven occasions: in 1978, 1998, 2006, 2014, 2018, 2022, and 2026. They are yet to progress from the group stages.

In March 2025, they qualified for the 2026 FIFA World Cup following a 2–2 home draw against Uzbekistan in the third round of AFC qualification and will make a seventh finals appearance.

== Record at the FIFA World Cup qualification ==
As of 2026 FIFA World Cup qualification - 1 March 2026

Rank	Team	Part	M	W	D	L	GF	GA	GD	Points
1	Mexico	17	189	121	41	27	453	134	+319	404
2	Australia	16	177	106	44	27	445	132	+313	362
3	South Korea	16	167	105	44	18	339	98	+241	359
4	Iran	12	162	103	39	20	351	101	+250	348
5	Costa Rica	18	197	98	51	48	334	191	+141	345
6	Argentina	15	171	98	44	29	293	145	+148	338
7	Japan	16	154	96	29	29	359	94	+265	317
8	Netherlands	20	143	95	28	20	356	105	+251	313
9	Brazil	14	145	90	37	18	304	92	+212	307
10	Saudi Arabia	13	154	89	38	27	288	116	+172	305
11	Uruguay	18	190	84	53	53	262	198	+64	305
12	England	18	130	92	27	11	336	70	+266	303
13	Spain	20	131	92	27	12	312	83	+229	303
14	Portugal	22	155	87	36	32	304	153	+151	297
15	Belgium	21	149	86	30	31	331	154	+177	294

== Record at the FIFA World Cup ==
FIFA World Cup finals record										FIFA World Cup qualification record					
Year	Round	Position	Pld	W	D	L	GF	GA	Squad	Pld	W	D	L	GF	GA
(Uruguay) 1930	Not a FIFA member									No qualification					
(Italy) 1934	Not a FIFA member									Not a FIFA member					
(France) 1938	Not a FIFA member									Not a FIFA member					
(Brazil) 1950	Did not enter									Did not enter					
(Switzerland) 1954	Did not enter									Did not enter					
(Sweden) 1958	Did not enter									Did not enter					
(Chile) 1962	Did not enter									Did not enter					
(England) 1966	Did not enter									Did not enter					
(Mexico) 1970	Did not enter									Did not enter					
(West Germany) 1974	Did not qualify									8	5	1	2	9	6
(Argentina) 1978	First round	14th	3	0	1	2	2	8	Squad	12	10	2	0	20	3
(Spain) 1982	Withdrew									Withdrew					
(Mexico) 1986	Disqualified									Disqualified					
(Italy) 1990	Did not qualify									6	5	0	1	12	5
(United States) 1994	Did not qualify									11	5	3	3	23	13
(France) 1998	Group stage	20th	3	1	0	2	2	4	Squad	17	8	6	3	57	17
(South Korea) (Japan) 2002	Did not qualify									14	9	3	2	36	9
(Germany) 2006	Group stage	25th	3	0	1	2	2	6	Squad	12	9	1	2	29	7
(South Africa) 2010	Did not qualify									14	5	8	1	15	9
(Brazil) 2014	Group stage	28th	3	0	1	2	1	4	Squad	16	10	4	2	30	7
(Russia) 2018	Group stage	18th	3	1	1	1	2	2	Squad	18	12	6	0	36	5
(Qatar) 2022	Group stage	26th	3	1	0	2	4	7	Squad	18	14	1	3	49	8
(Canada) (Mexico) (United States) 2026	Group stage	33rd	3	0	3	0	3	3	Squad	16	11	4	1	35	12
(Morocco) (Portugal) (Spain) 2030	To be determined									To be determined					
(Saudi Arabia) 2034	To be determined									To be determined					
Total	First round	7/23	21	3	7	11	16	34	—	162	103	39	20	351	101

== Argentina 1978 ==
=== Group 4 ===
Pos	Team	Pld	W	D	L	GF	GA	GD	Pts	Qualification
1	Peru	3	2	1	0	7	2	+5	5	Advance to second round
2	Netherlands	3	1	1	1	5	3	+2	3	Advance to second round
3	Scotland	3	1	1	1	5	6	−1	3	
4	Iran	3	0	1	2	2	8	−6	1	

Source: FIFA
3 June 1978
16:45 ART

Netherlands	3–0	Iran
Rensenbrink 40' (pen.), 62', 78' (pen.)	Report

Estadio Ciudad de Mendoza, Mendoza
Attendance: 33,431
Referee: Alfonso González Archundia (Mexico)

7 June 1978
16:45 ART

Scotland	1–1	Iran
Eskandarian 43' (o.g.)	Report	Danaeifard 60'

Estadio Chateau Carreras, Córdoba
Attendance: 7,938
Referee: Youssou N'Diaye (Senegal)

11 June 1978
16:45 ART

Peru	4–1	Iran
Velásquez 2'; Cubillas 36' (pen.), 39' (pen.), 79'	Report	Rowshan 41'

Estadio Chateau Carreras, Córdoba
Attendance: 21,262
Referee: Alojzy Jarguz (Poland)

== France 1998 ==
=== Group F ===
Pos	Team	Pld	W	D	L	GF	GA	GD	Pts	Qualification
1	Germany	3	2	1	0	6	2	+4	7	Advance to knockout stage
2	FR Yugoslavia	3	2	1	0	4	2	+2	7	Advance to knockout stage
3	Iran	3	1	0	2	2	4	−2	3	
4	United States	3	0	0	3	1	5	−4	0	

Source: FIFA
14 June 1998
17:30

FR Yugoslavia	1–0	Iran
Mihajlović 72'	(Report)

Stade Geoffroy-Guichard, Saint-Étienne
Attendance: 30,600
Referee: Alberto Tejada (Peru)

21 June 1998
21:00

United States	1–2	Iran
McBride 87'	(Report)	Estili 40'; Mahdavikia 84'

Stade Gerland, Lyon
Attendance: 39,100
Referee: Urs Meier (Switzerland)

25 June 1998
21:00

Germany	2–0	Iran
Bierhoff 50'; Klinsmann 57'	(Report)

Stade de la Mosson, Montpellier
Attendance: 29,800
Referee: Epifanio González (Paraguay)

== Germany 2006 ==
=== Group D ===
Pos	Team	Pld	W	D	L	GF	GA	GD	Pts	Qualification
1	Portugal	3	3	0	0	5	1	+4	9	Advance to knockout stage
2	Mexico	3	1	1	1	4	3	+1	4	Advance to knockout stage
3	Angola	3	0	2	1	1	2	−1	2	
4	Iran	3	0	1	2	2	6	−4	1	

Source: FIFA
Rules for classification: Tie-breaking criteria
11 June 2006
18:00

Mexico	3–1	Iran
Bravo 28', 76'; Zinha 79'	(Report)	Golmohammadi 36'

FIFA WM Stadion Nürnberg, Nuremberg
Attendance: 41,000
Referee: Roberto Rosetti (Italy)

17 June 2006
15:00

Portugal	2–0	Iran
Deco 63'; Ronaldo 80' (pen.)	(Report)

FIFA WM Stadion Frankfurt, Frankfurt
Attendance: 48,000
Referee: Éric Poulat (France)

21 June 2006
16:00

Iran	1–1	Angola
Bakhtiarizadeh 75'	(Report)	Flávio 60'

Zentralstadion, Leipzig
Attendance: 38,000
Referee: Mark Shield (Australia)

== Brazil 2014 ==
=== Group F ===
Pos	Team	Pld	W	D	L	GF	GA	GD	Pts	Qualification
1	Argentina	3	3	0	0	6	3	+3	9	Advance to knockout stage
2	Nigeria	3	1	1	1	3	3	0	4	Advance to knockout stage
3	Bosnia and Herzegovina	3	1	0	2	4	4	0	3	
4	Iran	3	0	1	2	1	4	−3	1	

Source: FIFA
Rules for classification: Tie-breaking criteria
16 June 2014
16:00 UTC−3

Iran	0–0	Nigeria
	Report

Arena da Baixada, Curitiba
Attendance: 39,081
Referee: Carlos Vera (Ecuador)

21 June 2014
13:00 UTC−3

Argentina	1–0	Iran
Messi 90+1'	Report

Estádio Mineirão, Belo Horizonte
Attendance: 57,698
Referee: Milorad Mažić (Serbia)

25 June 2014
13:00 UTC−3

Bosnia and Herzegovina	3–1	Iran
Džeko 23'; Pjanić 59'; Vršajević 83'	Report	Ghoochannejhad 82'

Arena Fonte Nova, Salvador
Attendance: 48,011
Referee: Carlos Velasco Carballo (Spain)

== Russia 2018 ==
=== Group B ===
Pos	Team	Pld	W	D	L	GF	GA	GD	Pts	Qualification
1	Spain	3	1	2	0	6	5	+1	5	Advance to knockout stage
2	Portugal	3	1	2	0	5	4	+1	5	Advance to knockout stage
3	Iran	3	1	1	1	2	2	0	4	
4	Morocco	3	0	1	2	2	4	−2	1	

Source: FIFA
Rules for classification: Group stage tiebreakers
15 June 2018
18:00 MSK (UTC+3)

Morocco	0–1	Iran
	Report	Bouhaddouz 90+5' (o.g.)

Krestovsky Stadium, Saint Petersburg
Attendance: 62,548
Referee: Cüneyt Çakır (Turkey)

20 June 2018
21:00 MSK (UTC+3)

Iran	0–1	Spain
	Report	Costa 54'

Kazan Arena, Kazan
Attendance: 42,718
Referee: Andrés Cunha (Uruguay)

25 June 2018
21:00 MSK (UTC+3)

Iran	1–1	Portugal
Ansarifard 90+3' (pen.)	Report	Quaresma 45'

Mordovia Arena, Saransk
Attendance: 41,685
Referee: Enrique Cáceres (Paraguay)

== Qatar 2022 ==
Simultaneous to the Mahsa Amini protests in Iran, the team declined to sing the national anthem prior to their match with England. Prior to the match, captain Ehsan Hajsafi, said that the team support protestors. In 2nd match they sing the national anthem and they won the match against Wales.

=== Group B ===
Pos	Team	Pld	W	D	L	GF	GA	GD	Pts	Qualification
1	England	3	2	1	0	9	2	+7	7	Advance to knockout stage
2	United States	3	1	2	0	2	1	+1	5	Advance to knockout stage
3	Iran	3	1	0	2	4	7	−3	3	
4	Wales	3	0	1	2	1	6	−5	1	

Source: FIFA
Rules for classification: Group stage tiebreakers
21 November 2022
16:00

England	6–2	Iran
Bellingham 35'; Saka 43', 62'; Sterling 45+1'; Rashford 71'; Grealish 90'		Taremi 65', 90+13' (pen.)

Khalifa International Stadium, Al Rayyan
Attendance: 45,334
Referee: Raphael Claus (Brazil)

25 November 2022
13:00

Wales	0–2	Iran
		Cheshmi 90+8'; Rezaeian 90+11'

Ahmad bin Ali Stadium, Al Rayyan
Attendance: 40,875
Referee: Mario Escobar (Guatemala)

29 November 2022
22:00

Iran	0–1	United States
		Pulisic 38'

Al Thumama Stadium, Doha
Attendance: 42,127
Referee: Antonio Mateu Lahoz (Spain)

== United States/Mexico/Canada 2026 ==
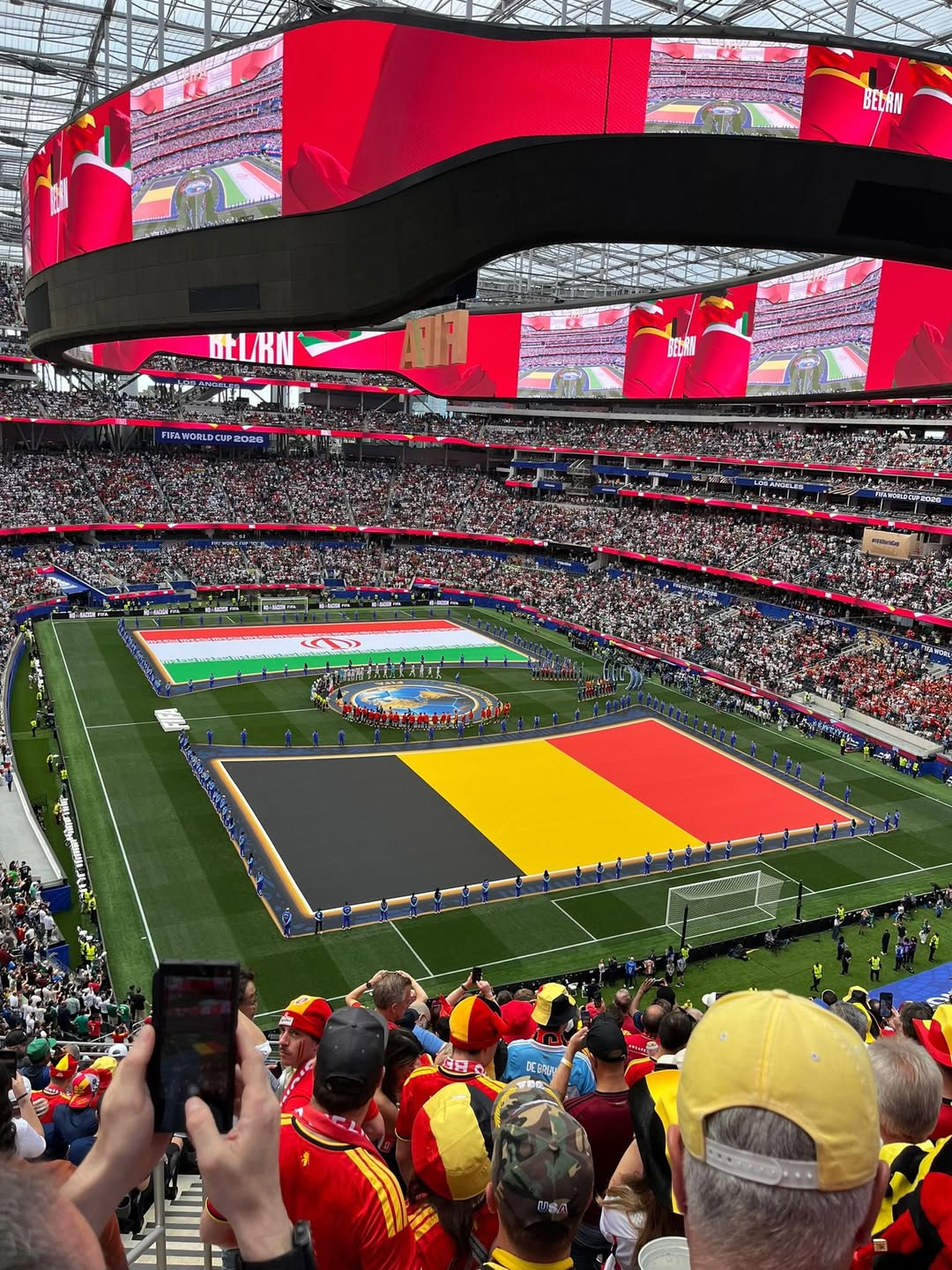
Prior to the Iran vs. Belgium match at SoFi Stadium in Los Angeles.

Iran's participation became uncertain months before the 2026 FIFA World Cup following the 2026 Iran war with Israel and the United States conducting military operations on the country. A request to move Iran's group stage matches to Mexico was denied. The Iran team which took base in Tijuana, eventually participated however they were only allowed to stay in the United States one day prior to their match day and had to return to Mexico the same evening after each match.

=== Group G ===
Pos	Team	Pld	W	D	L	GF	GA	GD	Pts	Qualification
1	Belgium	3	1	2	0	6	2	+4	5 (Note: Tied on head-to-head result (Belgium 1–1 Egypt). Overall goal difference was used as the tiebreaker.)	Advance to knockout stage
2	Egypt	3	1	2	0	5	3	+2	5	Advance to knockout stage
3	Iran	3	0	3	0	3	3	0	3	
4	New Zealand	3	0	1	2	4	10	−6	1	

Source: FIFA
Rules for classification: Group stage tiebreakers
Notes:
June 15, 2026
6:00 p.m. UTC−7

Iran	2–2	New Zealand
Rezaeian 32'; Mohebi 64'	(Note: "IR Iran vs New Zealand | First Stage | FIFA World Cup 2026". FIFA. Retrieved June 15, 2026.; "Match Report – Group G – IR Iran v. New Zealand". FIFA. June 15, 2026. Retrieved June 16, 2026.; "Post match summary report – Group G – IR Iran v. New Zealand". FIFA. June 15, 2026. Retrieved June 16, 2026.)	Just 7', 54'

SoFi Stadium, Inglewood
Attendance: 70,108
Referee: César Arturo Ramos (Mexico)

June 21, 2026
12:00 p.m. UTC−7

Belgium	0–0	Iran
	(Note: "Belgium vs IR Iran | First Stage | FIFA World Cup 2026". FIFA. Retrieved June 21, 2026.; "Match Report – Group G – Belgium v. IR Iran". FIFA. June 21, 2026. Retrieved June 21, 2026.; "Post match summary report – Group G – Belgium v. IR Iran". FIFA. June 22, 2026. Retrieved June 22, 2026.)

SoFi Stadium, Inglewood
Attendance: 70,317
Referee: Darío Herrera (Argentina)

June 26, 2026
8:00 p.m. UTC−7

Egypt	1–1	Iran
Saber 5'	(Note: "Egypt vs IR Iran | First Stage | FIFA World Cup 2026". FIFA. Retrieved June 27, 2026.; "Match Report – Group G – Egypt v. IR Iran". FIFA. June 27, 2026. Retrieved June 27, 2026.; "Post match summary report – Group G – Egypt v. IR Iran". FIFA. June 27, 2026. Retrieved June 27, 2026.)	Rezaeian 14'

Lumen Field, Seattle
Attendance: 66,925
Referee: Szymon Marciniak (Poland)

== By match ==
No.	World Cup	Round	Opponent	Score	Result	Iran scorer(s)
1	1978	Group 4	Netherlands	0–3	L	
2	1978	Group 4	Scotland	1–1	D	Danaeifard 60'
3	1978	Group 4	Peru	1–4	L	Rowshan 41'
4	1998	Group F	FR Yugoslavia	0–1	L	
5	1998	Group F	United States	2–1	W	Estili 40', Mahdavikia 84'
6	1998	Group F	Germany	0–2	L	
7	2006	Group D	Mexico	1–3	L	Golmohammadi 36'
8	2006	Group D	Portugal	0–2	L	
9	2006	Group D	Angola	1–1	D	Bakhtiarizadeh 75'
10	2014	Group F	Nigeria	0–0	D	
11	2014	Group F	Argentina	0–1	L	
12	2014	Group F	Bosnia and Herzegovina	1–3	L	Ghoochannejhad 82'
13	2018	Group B	Morocco	1–0	W	Bouhaddouz 90+5' (o.g.)
14	2018	Group B	Spain	0–1	L	
15	2018	Group B	Portugal	1–1	D	Ansarifard 90+3' (pen.)
16	2022	Group B	England	2–6	L	Taremi 65', 90+13' (pen.)
17	2022	Group B	Wales	2–0	W	Cheshmi 90+8', Rezaeian 90+11'
18	2022	Group B	United States	0–1	L	
19	2026	Group G	New Zealand	2–2	D	Rezaeian 32', Mohebi 64'
20	2026	Group G	Belgium	0–0	D	
21	2026	Group G	Egypt	1–1	D	Rezaeian 14'

== Player records ==
=== Most appearances ===
Rank	Player	Matches	World Cups
1	Ehsan Hajsafi	11	2014, 2018, 2022 and 2026
2	Alireza Jahanbakhsh	10	2014, 2018, 2022 and 2026
3	Mehdi Taremi	9	2018, 2022 and 2026
4	Alireza Beiranvand	8	2018, 2022 and 2026
4	Saeid Ezatolahi	8	2018, 2022 and 2026
4	Milad Mohammadi	8	2018, 2022 and 2026
4	Ramin Rezaeian	8	2018, 2022 and 2026
8	Saman Ghoddos	7	2018, 2022 and 2026
9	Mehdi Mahdavikia	6	1998 and 2006
9	Andranik Teymourian	6	2006 and 2014
9	Karim Ansarifard	6	2014, 2018 and 2022
9	Sardar Azmoun	6	2018 and 2022
9	Majid Hosseini	6	2018 and 2022
9	Morteza Pouraliganji	6	2018 and 2022

=== Goalscorers ===
On 7 June 1978, Iraj Danaeifard made history by scoring Iran's first-ever FIFA World Cup goal, coming in their opening match against Scotland in Córdoba.

Player	Goals	1978	1998	2006	2014	2018	2022	2026
Ramin Rezaeian	3						1	2
Mehdi Taremi	2						2	
Iraj Danaeifard	1	1						
Hassan Rowshan	1	1						
Hamid Estili	1		1					
Mehdi Mahdavikia	1		1					
Yahya Golmohammadi	1			1				
Sohrab Bakhtiarizadeh	1			1				
Reza Ghoochannejhad	1				1			
Karim Ansarifard	1					1		
Rouzbeh Cheshmi	1						1	
Mohammad Mohebbi	1							1
Own goal	1					1		
Total	16	2	2	2	1	2	4	3

== Head-to-head record ==
Opponent	Pld	W	D	L	GF	GA	GD	Win %
Angola	1	0	1	0	1	1	+0	0.00
Argentina	1	0	0	1	0	1	−1	0.00
Belgium	1	0	1	0	0	0	+0	0.00
Bosnia and Herzegovina	1	0	0	1	1	3	−2	0.00
Egypt	1	0	1	0	1	1	+0	0.00
England	1	0	0	1	2	6	−4	0.00
Germany	1	0	0	1	0	2	−2	0.00
Mexico	1	0	0	1	1	3	−2	0.00
Morocco	1	1	0	0	1	0	+1	100.00
Netherlands	1	0	0	1	0	3	−3	0.00
New Zealand	1	0	1	0	2	2	+0	0.00
Nigeria	1	0	1	0	0	0	+0	0.00
Peru	1	0	0	1	1	4	−3	0.00
Portugal	2	0	1	1	1	3	−2	0.00
Scotland	1	0	1	0	1	1	+0	0.00
Spain	1	0	0	1	0	1	−1	0.00
United States	2	1	0	1	2	2	+0	50.00
Wales	1	1	0	0	2	0	+2	100.00
FR Yugoslavia	1	0	0	1	0	1	−1	0.00
Total	21	3	7	11	16	34	−18	14.29

== See also ==
- Asian nations at the FIFA World Cup
- Iran at the AFC Asian Cup
