= Park Jeong-hun =

Park Jeong-hun or Pak Jŏng-hun (박정훈) may refer to:

- Pak Jong-hun (born 1948), North Korean footballer
- Park Jeong-hun, South Korean League of Legends player also known as "kfo"
- Park Jung-hoon (cinematographer) (born 1982), South Korean cinematographer and film director
- Park Jung-hoon (footballer) (born 1988), South Korean football player
