= Morteza Yekkeh =

Iranian footballer

Personal information
- Full name: Morteza Yekkeh
- Date of birth: 20 October 1960 (age 66)
- Place of birth: Tehran, Iran
- Height: 1.78 m (5 ft 10 in)
- Position: Forward

Senior career*
Years	Team	Apps	(Gls)
1978–1979	Shahbaz Tehran		
1980–1983	Rah Ahan Tehran		
1984	Homa Tehran		
1985–1989	Shahin Tehran		
1987	Mohammedan		
1989–1990	Esteghlal		
1990–1992	Gostaresh Tehran		
1992–1994	Shahin Tehran		
1994–1995	Pars Khodro Tehran		

International career
1986	Iran	6	(1)
- * Club domestic league appearances and goals

Morteza Yekkeh (Persian: مرتضی یکّه; born 20 October 1960) is a retired Iranian forward who played for the Iran national football team in the 1986 Asian Games. He formerly played for Gostaresh Tehran and Esteghlal Tehran.

In 1987, Morteza represented Mohammedan in Bangladesh and helped the club win the domestic league title.

== Honours ==
Mohammedan

- Dhaka First Division League: 1987
