= Tehan =

Tehan is a surname. Notable people with the surname include:

- Dan Tehan (born 1968), American politician
- Joseph Tehan, American poker player
- Marie Tehan (1940–2004), Australian politician
- Robert Emmet Tehan (1905–1975), American jurist
- Tom Tehan (1916–1996), Australian politician
