= Cai Jinbiao =

Chinese footballer

Cai Jinbiao 蔡锦标
Personal information
- Full name: Cai Jinbiao
- Date of birth: June 1954 (age 72)
- Place of birth: Xingning, Guangdong, China
- Height: 1.78 m (5 ft 10 in)
- Position: Defender

Senior career*
Years	Team	Apps	(Gls)
1974–1983	Guangdong team		

International career
1976–1982	China	20	(1)
Medal record
Men's football
Representing China
AFC Asian Cup
Bronze medal – third place	1976 Iran	Team
Asian Games
Bronze medal – third place	1978 Bangkok	Football
- * Club domestic league appearances and goals

Cai Jinbiao (Chinese: 蔡锦标; born 1954) is a former Chinese international footballer who played as a defender. He represented Guangdong team where he won the 1979 Chinese league title as well as playing for the China national football team in the 1980 Asian Cup.

== Playing career ==
At an early age, Cai Jinbiao would be accepted in a specialist sports school within Xingning, Guangdong. This was before he started his career playing for the Guangdong youth team where he would soon be promoted to the senior team in 1974.

Despite his relatively short height for a defender, he would go on to establish himself as an extremely effective defender and receive the nickname "Steel head" by the local fans. He would soon receive his first call-up to the Chinese national team by the manager Nian Weisi while back at his club Cai's free-kick skills and jumping ability would then go on to see Guangdong FC win their first ever Chinese league title at the end of the 1979 league season.

== Career statistics ==
=== International statistics ===
Competition	Year	Apps	Goal
Friendly	1978-1982	5	0
Great Wall Cup	1980	1	0
Asian Cup	1980	2	0
World Cup Qualifier	1980-1982	12	1
Total		20	1

== Honours ==
Guangdong FC

- China national league: 1979
