= Mojtaba Moharrami =

Iranian footballer and coach

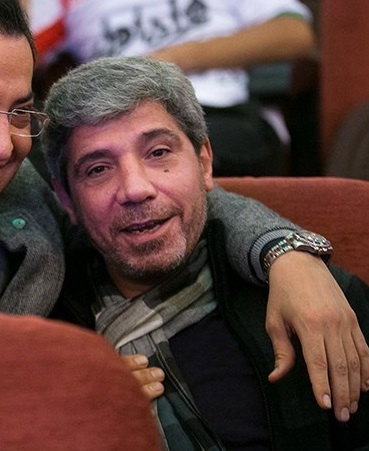

Personal information
- Full name: Mojtaba Moharrami
- Date of birth: 16 April 1964 (age 62)
- Place of birth: Tehran, Iran
- Height: 5 ft 10 in (1.78 m)
- Position: Left back

Youth career
- 1975–1978: Rah Ahan

Senior career*
Years	Team	Apps	(Gls)
1978–1980	Rah Ahan		
1980–1985	Shahin		
1985–1988	Nirouye Zamini		
1988–1997	Persepolis	174	(41)
1997–1998	Al-Arabi		

International career
1988–1996	Iran	37	(5)

Managerial career
- 2011–2013: Steel Azin B
- 2013: Persepolis B
- * Club domestic league appearances and goals

Mojtaba Moharrami (Persian: مجتبی محرمی, born 16 April 1964) is an Iranian former football player and now coach. He is current head coach of Persepolis Reserves.

Moharrami made 37 appearances for the Iran national football team. He was captain of the national team at Asian Cup 1996. Regardless of the fact that he has been one of the best left-backs of Iranian football history, he is mostly known for his several controversial actions in different matches. In the infamous Persepolis–Esteghlal derby in 1993, he was accused to be in the limelight of the brawl and was banned for three years. In a rare appearance in a live TV show in 2011, he claimed that the punishment which ruined his career was too severe and unfair. He also was banned for a year for attacking referee Jamal Al Sharif during Iran–Japan match in 1992 Asian Cup. Despite his actions towards referees and opponents in the games, he has remained a popular figure in the Iranian football history and considered an icon. During Persepolis matches, whenever the crowd is not satisfied with referee's decisions they chant Moharrami's name to remind the referee that he would have been kicked if Moharrami were in the game.

== Career statistics ==
=== International goals ===
#	Date	Venue	Opponent	Score	Result	Competition
1.	3 November 1989	Kuwait City, Kuwait	Guinea	1–1	Draw	Friendly
2.	11 May 1992	Salt Lake Stadium, Kolkata, India	Pakistan	0–7	Won	1992 AFC Asian Cup qual.
3.	13 May 1992	Salt Lake Stadium, Kolkata, India	India	0–3	Won	1992 AFC Asian Cup qual.
4.	2 October 1992	Azadi Stadium, Tehran, Iran	Cameroon	1–1	Draw	Friendly
5.	9 October 1994	Athletic Stadium, Miyoshi, Japan	Yemen	4–0	Won	1994 Asian Games
Correct as of 4 January 2017

== Honours ==
=== Club ===
Persepolis

- Asian Cup Winners' Cup (1): 1990–91
  - Runner-up (1): 1992–93
- Iranian Football League (1): 1996–97
  - Runner-up (2): 1991–92, 1992–93
- Qods League Runner-up (1): 1989–90
- Hazfi Cup (1): 1991–92
- Tehran Provincial League (3): 1988, 1989, 1990
  - Runner-up (1): 1991

=== Country ===
Iran

- Asian Games Gold Medal (1): 1990

== Personal life ==
On 4 January 2026, Moharrami publicly supported the 2025–2026 Iranian protests by posting a graphic design in support of the protests. He previously appeared on Persepolis's TV channel to react to a football match, and a tattoo of Mohammad Reza Pahlavi's signature could be seen on Moharrami's arm.
