= Shahin Bayani =

Iranian football Defender

Personal information
- Date of birth: 31 January 1962 (age 64)
- Place of birth: Iran
- Position: Defender

Senior career*
Years	Team	Apps	(Gls)
1979–1986	Esteghlal		
1986–1989	Al-Ahli		
1989–1994	Esteghlal		

International career
1984–1990	Iran	16	(0)
- * Club domestic league appearances and goals

Shahin Bayani (in Persian شاهین بیانی) is an Iranian football defender who played for Iran in the 1984 Asian Cup. He also played for Esteghlal.

== International Records ==
Year	Apps	Goal
1984	5	0
1985	2	1
1986	8	0
1990	3	0
Total	18	1

== Honours ==
- Asian Cup:

Fourth Place : 1984

Sporting positions
Preceded by Jafar Mokhtarifar	Esteghlal Tehran FC captain 1990–1995	Succeeded by Amir Ghalenoei
