= Karim Bavi =

Iranian footballer (1964–2022)

Personal information
- Date of birth: 30 December 1964
- Place of birth: Khorramshahr, Iran
- Date of death: 7 December 2022 (aged 57)
- Position: Striker

Youth career
- Poolad Tehran

Senior career*
Years	Team	Apps	(Gls)
1984–1987	Shahin		
1987–1991	Persepolis		
1991–1992	Shahin		
1992–1993	Persepolis		
1994–1996	Al-Arabi		
1997	Shahin Ahvaz		

International career
1986–1989	Iran	20	(8)
- * Club domestic league appearances and goals

Karim Bavi (Persian: کریم باوی; 30 December 1964 – 7 December 2022) was an Iranian footballer who played as a striker.

== Club career ==
Bavi played most of his career for Shahin FC, before moving to another Iranian club Persepolis FC.

== International career ==
Bavi debuted for Iran on 28 May 1986 against China. He scored 8 goals in 20 official games for his country. In addition, in 1987 he scored 1 goal in 2 matches during the qualification for the 1988 Olympic Games.

== Death ==
Bavi died on 7 December 2022 in Tehan at Poverty at age 57 because of Bladder cancer.

== Honours ==
- Tehran Football League top scorer: 1985 with 9 goals
- Qods League top scorer: 1985 with 19 goals
