= Abdolali Changiz =

Iranian football forward (born 1957)

Personal information
- Date of birth: 27 April 1957 (age 69)
- Place of birth: Isfahan, Imperial State of Iran
- Position: Forward

Senior career*
Years	Team	Apps	(Gls)
1981–1986	Esteghlal		
1986–1988	Al-Ahli		
1988–1990	Al-Arabi		
1990–1992	Esteghlal		

International career
1977	Iran U20	3	(0)
1982–1986	Iran	19	(6)
- * Club domestic league appearances and goals

Abdolali Changiz (Persian: عبدالعلی چنگیز) is an Iranian football forward who played for Iran in the 1984 Asian Cup. He also played for Esteghlal, Al-Ahli and Al-Arabi. He was perhaps one of the finest football players of his generation in Iran and Asia.

== Honours ==
=== International ===
- Asian Cup:

Fourth Place : 1984

=== Club ===
- Tehran Provincial League

Winner: 2

1981–82 with Esteghlal FC
1984–85 with Esteghlal FC

Runner up: 2

1981–82 with Esteghlal FC
1987–88 with Esteghlal FC

Third Place: 1

1985–86 with Esteghlal FC
