= Sirous Ghayeghran =

Iranian footballer (1962–1998)

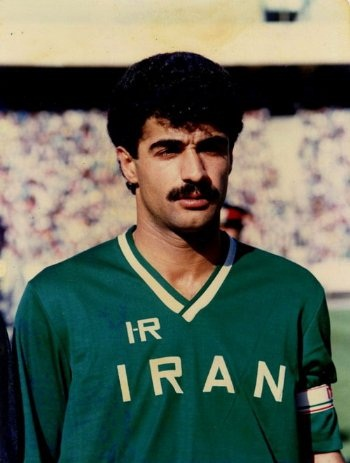

Personal information
- Full name: Sirous Ghayeghran
- Date of birth: 21 January 1962
- Place of birth: Bandar Anzali, Iran
- Date of death: 7 April 1998 (aged 36)
- Height: 1.80 m (5 ft 11 in)
- Position: Midfielder

Youth career
- 1970–1980: Malavan

Senior career*
Years	Team	Apps	(Gls)
1980–1987	Malavan	689	(478)
1987–1989	Al-Gharrafa	40	(35)
1989–1990	Esteghlal Anzali		
1990–1991	Malavan		
1991–1995	Keshavarz		

International career
1986–1993	Iran	40	(6)

Managerial career
- 1994–1996: Keshavarz
- 1997–1998: Masoud Hormozgan
- * Club domestic league appearances and goals

Sirous Ghayeghran (Persian: سيروس قايقران) (21 January 1962 – 7 April 1998) was an Iranian footballer and former captain of Iran national football team.

== Playing career ==
=== Club career ===
He played most of his club career for Malavan FC. In 1990, he signed for Ai-Ittihad of Qatar. He did not forget his roots and soon returned to Malavan, helping the club win the Hazfi Cup and participate in the Asian Club Championship. In 1993, he moved to the big spending team of the time Keshavarz FC, where he was also a coach. The team obtained respectable results but Ghayeghran moved to second division team Masoud Hormozgan where he coached once again. In 1997 and 1998 Ghayeghran stated numerous times that he would like to be involved with Malavan again, either as a coach or player.

=== International career ===
In February 1986 he made his debut for the national team against Pakistan. In 1987 Ghayeghran became the national team captain, after most of the already established national team members who had participated in the Asian tournaments from 1984 to 1986 resigned from playing (these included top stars such as Nasser Mohammadkhani, Hamid Alidoosti, Shahrokh Bayani, etc.) In 1988 thanks to Ghayeghran's leadership an underprepared and inexperienced Iran side finished third in the Asian Cup tournament. He and Mehdi Fonoonizadeh came out as the two players with their trademark long-range shots, which usually compensated for Iran's shortage in the area of teamwork. Two years later the team became the 1990 Asian Games champions, where Ghayeghran scored one of the most memorable goals in Iranian football history against South Korea.

He finished his international career with 43 caps and 6 goals.

Iran national team
Year	Apps	Goals
1985	1	0
1986	7	1
1987	2	0
1988	10	1
1989	8	1
1990	5	1
1991	1	0
1992	8	2
1993	1	0
Total	43	6

== Career statistics ==
=== International goals ===
#	Date	Venue	Opponent	Score	Result	Competition
1.	24 September 1986	Hanbat Stadium, South Korea, Kuwait	Bangladesh	4–0	W	1986 Asian Games
2.	27 May 1988	Dasarath Rangasala Stadium, Kathmandu, Nepal	Hong Kong	2–0	W	1988 AFC Asian Cup Qualifier
3.	23 February 1989	National Stadium, Bangkok, Thailand	Thailand	0–3	W	1990 FIFA World Cup Qualifier
4.	3 October 1990	Workers' Stadium, Beijing, China	South Korea	1–0	W	1990 Asian Games – Semifinal
5.	11 May 1992	Salt Lake Stadium, Kolkata, India	Pakistan	7–0	W	1992 AFC Asian Cup Qualifier
6.	30 October 1992	Bingo Stadium, Onomichi, Japan	North Korea	0–2	W	1992 AFC Asian Cup
Correct as of 24 July 2021

== Death ==
On 7 April 1998 as Ghayeghran and some family members were driving towards Tehran during a holiday in Norouz, they collided with a truck, leaving Ghayeghran and his son dead.

== Honors ==
=== Club ===
Malavan

- Hazfi Cup: 1986, 1990
  - Runner-up: 1987

=== National ===
Iran

- Asian Games: 1990
- Third place: 1988

=== Individual ===
- Asian Cup Team of the Tournament: 1988
