= Nasser Mohammadkhani =

Iranian footballer

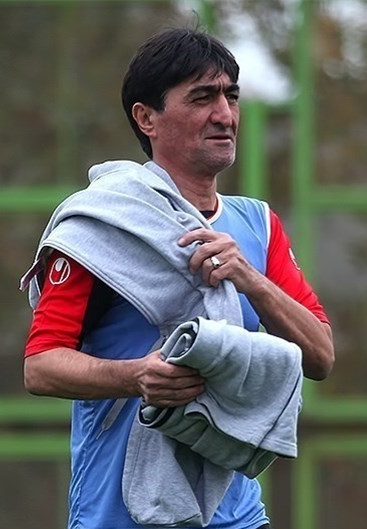

Personal information
- Full name: Nasser Mohammadkhani
- Date of birth: 7 September 1957 (age 69)
- Place of birth: Tehran, Iran
- Height: 1.72 m (5 ft 8 in)
- Position: Striker

Youth career
- 1972–1975: Sanaati Behshahr

Senior career*
Years	Team	Apps	(Gls)
1975–1976	Sanaati Behshahr		
1976–1981	Rah Ahan		
1981–1986	Persepolis		
1986–1989	Qatar Sports		
1989–1994	Persepolis	124	(63)

International career
1982–1990	Iran	27	(14)
- * Club domestic league appearances and goals

Nasser Mohammadkhani (Persian: ناصر محمدخانی, born 7 September 1957) is a retired Iranian footballer. He was a striker during his playing days. He also worked as a coach for Tehran's Persepolis Club.

== Honours ==
=== Club ===
Persepolis

- Asian Cup Winners' Cup (1): 1990–91
  - Runner-up: 1992–93
- Hazfi Cup (1): 1991–92
- Tehran Province League (3): 1982–83, 1989–90, 1990–91
- Tehran Hazfi Cup (1): 1981–82

Qatar SC

- Qatari Sheikh Jassim Cup (1): 1987

=== National ===
Iran

- Asian Games Gold Medal (1): 1990

== Personal life ==
Mohammadkhani was involved in a public court case in Iran, after his wife Laleh Saharkhizan was found murdered in her apartment on 9 October 2002. Shahla Jahed, his mistress in a temporary marriage arrangement was convicted of the murder of Laleh. Mohammadkhani was in Germany when the killing happened, but it emerged later that he was "temporarily married" to Jahed, a practice allowed under Shia Islam and thus under Iranian law. Jahed was executed in 2010, following the completion of the appeals procedure. In 2008, the then chief of Iran's judiciary, Mahmoud Hashemi Shahroudi, ordered a fresh investigation and did not sanction her execution ruling that her initial conviction (based as it was on a confession she made under duress) was unacceptable.

On 5 January 2026, Mohammadkhani publicly supported the 2025–2026 Iranian protests on his Instagram, stating: "Hand in hand for Iran. Freedom is closer to us than our jugular vein."

== International goals ==
No.	Date	Venue	Opponent	Score	Result	Competition
1.	25 November 1982	New Delhi, India	South Yemen	1–0	2–0	1982 Asian Games
2.	7 August 1984	Jakarta, Indonesia	Bangladesh	1–0	5–0	1984 AFC Asian Cup qualification
3.	7 August 1984	Jakarta, Indonesia	Bangladesh	2–0	5–0	1984 AFC Asian Cup qualification
4.	7 August 1984	Jakarta, Indonesia	Bangladesh	3–0	5–0	1984 AFC Asian Cup qualification
5.	7 August 1984	Jakarta, Indonesia	Bangladesh	4–0	5–0	1984 AFC Asian Cup qualification
6.	9 August 1984	Surakarta, Indonesia	Syria	2–1	3–1	1984 AFC Asian Cup qualification
7.	11 August 1984	Jakarta, Indonesia	Thailand	3–0	5–0	1984 AFC Asian Cup qualification
8.	13 August 1984	Jakarta, Indonesia	Indonesia	1–0	1–0	1984 AFC Asian Cup qualification
9.	15 August 1984	Jakarta, Indonesia	Philippines	2–0	7–1	1984 AFC Asian Cup qualification
10.	15 August 1984	Jakarta, Indonesia	Philippines	5–0	7–1	1984 AFC Asian Cup qualification
11.	1 December 1984	Kallang, Singapore	United Arab Emirates	3–0	3–0	1984 AFC Asian Cup
12.	3 December 1984	Kallang, Singapore	China	1–0	2–0	1984 AFC Asian Cup
13.	16 December 1984	Kallang, Singapore	Kuwait	1–1	1–1 (a.e.t.) (3–5 p)	1984 AFC Asian Cup
14.	22 September 1986	Daejeon, South Korea	Japan	2–0	2–0	1986 Asian Games
