= Abdolreza Barzegari =

Iranian footballer

Abdolreza Barzegari عبدالرضا برزگری
Personal information
- Full name: Abdolreza Barzegari
- Date of birth: 3 July 1958 (age 68)
- Place of birth: Abadan, Imperial State of Iran
- Height: 1.90 m (6 ft 3 in)
- Position: Midfielder

Youth career
- 1973–1974: Shahrdari Abadan

Senior career*
Years	Team	Apps	(Gls)
1974–1979	Sanat Naft		
1979–1982	Al-Nasr		
1982–1992	Qatar SC		
1992–1994	Al-Masry		

International career
1977	Iran-U20		
1978–1980	Iran	15	(8)
- * Club domestic league appearances and goals

Abdolreza Barzegari (Persian: عبدالرضا برزگری; born 3 July 1958) is a former Iranian football player.

== Playing career ==
Barzagari known as "The Black Pearl of Iran", he started playing football at a young age in his neighborhood of Ahmad Abad in Abadan. After changing a few teams during his earlier years, he joined Sanat Naft, the most popular team of Khuzestan. He made his debut at 17 against Tractor Sazi in Takhte Jamshid League, but his debut was not too promising and did not go well for the young player. He was benched for the next game but figured in the team which hosted Persepolis in 1975 touching shoulders with the greats such as Ali Parvin and Parviz Ghelichkhani. After that, Barzagari quickly became a famous player particularity for his excellent dribbling skill. He was selected for the Youth team and he Represented Iran in the Inaugural FIFA youth World Cup in Tunisia. He scored on that tournament. Then came national team and later many years of playing club football abroad in UAE, Qatar and Egypt. He played two seasons for Al-Nasr, then moved to Qatar SC and remained there until he joined Al-Masry in 1992 together with his friend Ebrahim Ghasempour.

== International career ==
He was a member of the Iran national under-20 football team at 1977 FIFA World Youth Championship. He made his debut for Iran national football team in Tehran on 6 September 1978 versus USSR. After that he played for national team in 1980 Olympic Games Qualification and 1980 AFC Asian Cup.

== Career statistics ==
=== International ===
Scores and results list Iran's goal tally first, score column indicates score after each Barzegari goal.

List of international goals scored by Abdolreza Barzegari
No.	Date	Venue	Opponent	Score	Result	Competition
1	27 February 1980	National Stadium, Kallang, Singapore	China	1–0	2–2	1980 Summer Olympics qualification
2	7 March 1980	National Stadium, Kallang, Singapore	India	1–0	2–0	1980 Summer Olympics qualification
3	9 March 1980	National Stadium, Kallang, Singapore	Sri Lanka	?–0	11–0	1980 Summer Olympics qualification
4	9 March 1980	National Stadium, Kallang, Singapore	Sri Lanka	?–0	11–0	1980 Summer Olympics qualification
5	12 March 1980	National Stadium, Kallang, Singapore	Singapore	3–0	4–0	1980 Summer Olympics qualification
6	7 September 1980	Al Nahyan Stadium, Abu Dhabi, United Arab Emirates	United Arab Emirates	3–0	3–0	Friendly
7	22 September 1980	Sabah Al Salem Stadium, Kuwait City, Kuwait	Bangladesh	3–0	7–0	1980 AFC Asian Cup
8	22 September 1980	Sabah Al Salem Stadium, Kuwait City, Kuwait	Bangladesh	7–0	7–0	1980 AFC Asian Cup
