= Wu Wenbing =

Chinese footballer

Personal information
- Date of birth: 28 July 1965 (age 61)
- Place of birth: Xingning, Guangdong, China
- Position: Midfielder

Senior career*
Years	Team	Apps	(Gls)
- Guangdong Winnerway

International career
1988	China	4	(0)

Managerial career
- 2024–: Guangdong Red Treasure
- * Club domestic league appearances and goals

Wu Wenbing (Chinese: 伍文兵; born 28 July 1965) is a Chinese football manager and former player who played as a midfielder for China in the 1988 Asian Cup, and is currently the manager of Guangdong Red Treasure. He spent his entire club career at Guangdong Winnerway and Qianwei Huandao.

== Career statistics ==
=== International statistics ===
Year	Competition	Apps	Goal
1988	Asian Cup	4	0
Total		4	0
