= Behtash Fariba =

Iranian footballer and coach

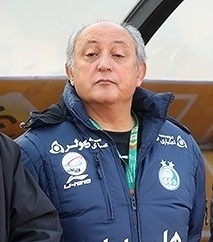

Personal information
- Full name: Behtash Fariba
- Date of birth: February 11, 1955 (age 71)
- Place of birth: Tehran, Iran
- Height: 1.78 m (5 ft 10 in)
- Position: Striker

Team information
- Current team: Esteghlal (technical director)

Youth career
- 1973–1976: Alborz

Senior career*
Years	Team	Apps	(Gls)
1976–1977	Rah Ahan		
1977–1979	Pas		
1979–1988	Esteghlal		

International career
1977–1986	Iran	16	(12)

Managerial career
- 1997–2000: Saipa (Assistant)
- 2000–2001: Saipa
- 2002–2004: Saba Battery (Assistant)
- 2005–2010: Mehrkam Pars
- 2010–2012: Esteghlal (Assistant)
- * Club domestic league appearances and goals

Behtash Fariba (Persian: بهتاش فریبا; born February 11, 1955) is a retired Iranian football player and now coach

== Club career ==
He played for a few clubs, including Rah Ahan F.C., Pas Tehran and Esteghlal F.C.

With Pas F.C. he won the Iranian Takht Jamshid in 1978.

With Esteghlal F.C. he won the Tehran Province League in 1983 and 1985.

== International career ==
He played for the Iran national football team and was a participant at the 1978 FIFA World Cup, where he was substituted in Iran's last match against Peru.

He also competed at the 1980 Asian Cup in Kuwait where Iran placed third and Fariba was one of the top scorers of the tournament.
