= Muayad Al-Haddad =

Kuwaiti footballer

Personal information
- Full name: Muayad Rehayyem Gamal Al-Haddad
- Date of birth: 3 March 1960 (age 66)
- Place of birth: Kuwait
- Height: 1.65 m (5 ft 5 in)
- Position: Forward

Senior career*
Years	Team	Apps	(Gls)
1976–1985	Khaitan Sporting Club		
1985–1993	Al-Qadsia		

International career
1980–1992	Kuwait		
- * Club domestic league appearances and goals

Muayad Rehayyem Gamal Al-Haddad (Arabic: مُؤَيَّد رَحِيم جَمَال الْحَدَّاد; born 3 March 1960) is a Kuwaiti former footballer who represented his country in the 1982 FIFA World Cup. Al-Haddad was a forward who also played for Khaitan Sporting Club.

== Withdrawal of Kuwaiti citizenship ==
The 18 of May 2025 Kuwaiti authorities announced the withdrawal of Kuwait citizenship from former national team star Moayad Al-Haddad.
