= Reza Ahadi =

Iranian football player and manager (1962–2016)

Personal information
- Full name: Reza Nadef Ahadi
- Date of birth: November 30, 1962
- Place of birth: Tehran, Iran
- Date of death: January 17, 2016 (aged 53)
- Place of death: Tehran, Iran
- Position: Midfielder

Youth career
- 1979–1981: Esteghlal

Senior career*
Years	Team	Apps	(Gls)
1980–1986	Esteghlal		
1986–1987	Rot-Weiss Essen	8	(1)
1987–1992	Esteghlal		
1992–1994	Bank Tejarat		
1994–1995	Zob Ahan		

International career
1982–1994	Iran	13	(2)

Managerial career
- 2001–2002: Esteghlal (youth)
- 2008: Esteghlal Ahvaz
- 2008–2009: Aboomoslem
- 2009: Shahdari Zanjan
- 2009: Kowsar
- 2010–2011: Paykan (assistant)
- 2011: Payam Mashhad
- * Club domestic league appearances and goals

Reza Ahadi (Persian: رضا احدی, November 30, 1962 – January 17, 2016) was an Iranian footballer who played as a midfielder for the Iran national team and Tehran's Esteghlal. He died following an internal infection and liver problems at the age of 53.

== Playing career ==
Ahadi played for Iranian club Esteghlal FC for most of his career. He was among the first Iranian players to pursue a career in European football as he joined Germany’s Rot-Weiss Essen in 1986 where he scored a goal in his eight appearances. He was a member of the Iran national football team from 1982–1984.

The former Esteghlal captain was called up 13 times to the national team and scored twice. He was the manager of a handful of teams such as Esteghlal Ahvaz, Paykan, Kowsar and Payam Mashhad during his short coaching career.

He had introduced a number of Iranian players, including Vahid Talebloo, Khosro Heydari and Andranik Teymourian to professional soccer.

== Achievements ==
- 4th Place 1989 Kuwait Peace & Friendship Tournament with Iran national football team
- Winner 1990 Iranian Football League with Esteghlal FC
