= Zia Arabshahi =

Iranian footballer

Personal information
- Full name: Seyed Zia Arabshahi
- Date of birth: 06.06.1958
- Place of birth: Iran
- Position: Midfielder

Senior career*
Years	Team	Apps	(Gls)
1976–1979	Pas Tehran	57	(23)
1979–1990	Perspolis	173	(10)
1990–1993	Poora F.C.	49	(17)
1993–1996	Shahin	64	(19)

International career
1982–1988	Iran	19	(2)
- * Club domestic league appearances and goals

Seyed Zia Arabshahi (Persian: ضیا عربشاهی, born 1958.06.06) is a retired Iranian football midfielder. He is a former member of the Iranian national team.

== Club career ==
At the age of 16, he joined Pas Tehran. After three years he was transferred to Persepolis FC, where he played for several seasons until 1990.

== International career ==
He played for Team Melli for a few years during the 1980s. Zia Arabshahi's memorable goal for the national team was the second goal against China in the 1984 Asian Cup in Singapore, which was selected the best goal of the tournament.
