= Gholamreza Fathabadi =

Iranian footballer

Gholamreza Fath-Abadi
Personal information
- Date of birth: December 31, 1957 (age 68)
- Place of birth: Iran
- Position: Forward

Senior career*
Years	Team	Apps	(Gls)
1979–1981	Esteghlal		
1981–1986	Persepolis		
1986–1988	Esteghlal		

International career
1980–1986	Iran	12	(5)
- * Club domestic league appearances and goals

Gholamreza Fath-Abadi is an Iranian football forward who played for Iran in the 1984 Asian Cup. He played for both clubs Esteghlal and Persepolis.

== International Records ==
Year	Apps	Goal
1980	1	0
1984	5	0
1985	2	0
1986	4	5
Total	12	5

== Honours ==
- Asian Cup:

Fourth Place : 1984
