= Chen Jingang =

Chinese footballer and coach

Chen Jingang 陈金刚
Personal information
- Full name: Chen Jingang
- Date of birth: February 4, 1958 (age 68)
- Place of birth: Tianjin, China
- Height: 1.81 m (5 ft 11 1/2 in)
- Position: Striker

Senior career*
Years	Team	Apps	(Gls)
1977–1987	Tianjin City		
1988–1989	Tianjin II		

International career
1979–1983	China	19	(4)

Managerial career
- 1997: Tianjin Teda
- 1998: China U-20
- 2004–2006: Changchun Yatai
- 2017–2019: Changchun Yatai
- * Club domestic league appearances and goals

Chen Jinjang (Chinese: 陈金刚; born February 4, 1958) is a Chinese coach and a former international football player. As a player, he was predominantly remembered for his time at Tianjin City while internationally he played for China in the 1980 Asian Cup. After retiring, he moved into management, where he moved back to Tianjin with Tianjin Teda F.C. before having a short spell as the Chinese U-20 coach and then Changchun Yatai.

== Playing career ==
Chen Jingang played for the Tianjin City youth, where he went on to graduate into the senior team by the 1977 league season. At Tianjin he went on to establish himself as a vital player within the team and soon aid the team to the 1980 league title. This then saw him called up to the Chinese national team and was included in the squad that took part in the 1980 Asian Cup. After a disappointing tournament, the manager Su Yongshun kept faith with Chen and included him in the squad that took part 1982 Fifa World Cup qualifiers where China missed out on qualifying after losing 2-1 to New Zealand in the final play-off round.

== Career statistics ==
=== International statistics ===
Competition	Year	Apps	Goal
Great Wall Cup	1980–1982	2	1
Friendly	1980–1982	4	0
Asian Cup	1980	1	1
World Cup Qualifier	1980–1981	9	2
Asian Games	1982	3	0
Total		19	4

== Honours ==
=== Player ===
Tianjin City

- Chinese Jia-A League: 1980
