= Jafar Mokhtarifar =

Iranian footballer

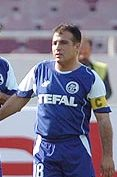

Personal information
- Full name: Jafar Mokhtarifar
- Date of birth: 7 September 1957 (age 69)
- Position: Forward

Senior career*
Years	Team	Apps	(Gls)
1983–1987	Esteghlal		
1987–1989	Al-Arabi		
1990–1991	saipa Tehran FCl		

International career
1984–1989	Iran	15	(1)
- * Club domestic league appearances and goals

Jafar Mokhtarifar (Persian: جعفر مختاری فر; born 7 September 1957) is an Iranian former footballer. He was a captain and former midfielder of Esteghlal and the Iranian national team. He is known as one of the best players in the history of Iranian football. He also played for Al Arabi.

== International Records ==
Year	Apps	Goal
1984	12	1
1985	2	0
Total	14	1

== Honours ==
- Asian Cup:

Fourth Place : 1984
