= Toshikazu Sano =

Japanese football referee

- Full name: Toshikazu Sano
- Born: October 11, 1940; Japan
- Died: 2000

International
Years	League	Role
1980s–1990	FIFA-listed	Referee

Toshikazu Sano (October 11, 1940 – 2000) was a football referee from Japan. He is known for having officiated the 1984 Olympic tournament in Los Angeles, as well as qualification for the 1982, 1986, and 1990 World Cups, and the 1981 and 1987 FIFA World Youth Championships.
