= Asghar Hajiloo =

Iranian footballer

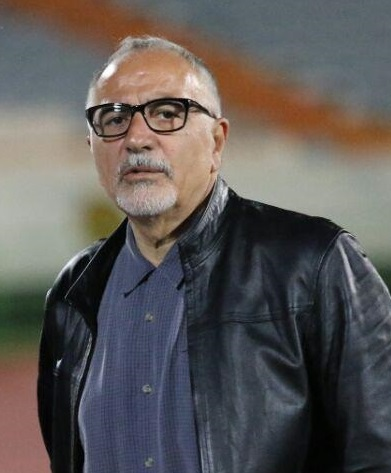

Personal information
- Full name: Asghar Hajiloo
- Date of birth: 1 August 1956 (age 70)
- Place of birth: Tehran, Iran
- Position: Defender

Senior career*
Years	Team	Apps	(Gls)
1976–1988	Esteghlal		

International career
1984–1986	Iran	18	(0)
- * Club domestic league appearances and goals

Asghar Hajiloo is a retired Iranian footballer who played as a defender. He represented Iran at the 1984 Asian Cup. He also played for Esteghlal.

== International Records ==
Year	Apps	Goal
1984	12	0
1985	3	0
1986	3	0
Total	18	0

== Honours ==
Esteghlal

- Iranian Football League (2): 1981–82 (Runner-up), 1982–83, 1984–85, 1987–88 (Runner-up)
- Hazfi Cup (1): 1976–77
