= Shahrokh Bayani =

Iranian footballer

Personal information
- Full name: Shahrokh Bayani Ashtiyani
- Date of birth: 31 December 1960 (age 65)
- Place of birth: Tehran, Iran
- Position: Midfielder

Senior career*
Years	Team	Apps	(Gls)
1978–1985	Esteghlal		
1985–1987	Persepolis FC		
1987-1989	Al-Shamal		
1989–1992	Esteghlal		
1992–1993	Zob Ahan		
1995	Zob Ahan		

International career
1980–1990	Iran	33	(8)

Managerial career
- 2010–2015: Esteghlal (Analyzer)
- * Club domestic league appearances and goals

Shahrokh Bayani (born 31 December 1960) is an Iranian former football midfielder who played for Iran in the 1984 Asian Cup. He also played for Esteghlal, Al-Shamal and Zob Ahan and Iran national football team.

== International records ==
Year	Apps	Goal
1984	9	3
1985	4	1
1986	7	2
1989	5	1
1990	6	1
Total	31	8

== Honours ==
=== Country ===
- AFC Asian Cup

Fourth Place (1): 1984
