= Jamal Al Sharif =

Syrian football referee

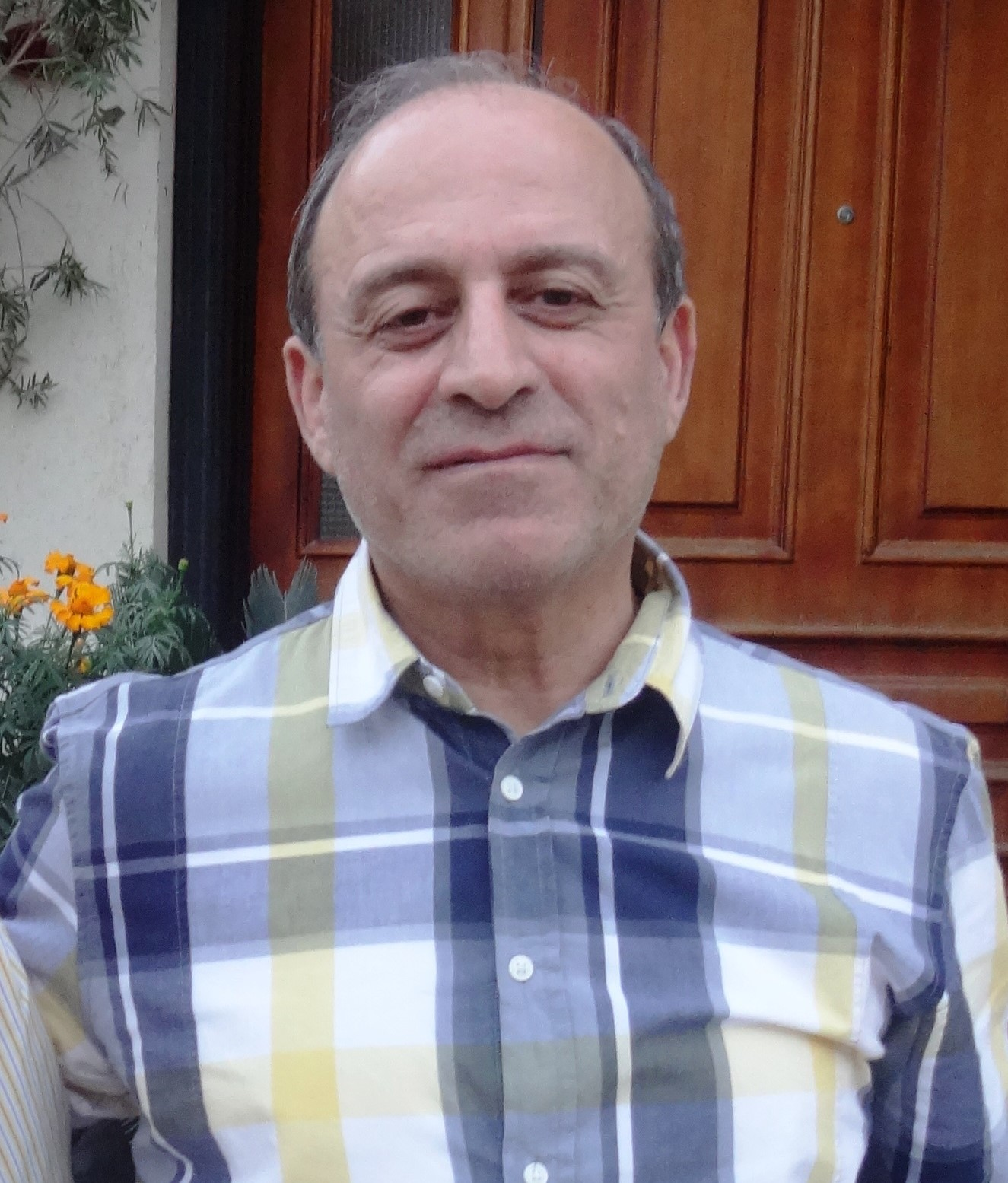
- Profile picture of Jamal Al Sharif
- Full name: Jamal Al Sharif
- Born: December 8, 1954 (age 71); Damascus, Syria

International
Years	League	Role
1986–1994	FIFA-listed	Referee

Jamal Al Sharif (Arabic: جمال الشريف; born 8 December 1954) is a retired football referee from Damascus, Syria. He is mostly known for supervising six matches in the FIFA World Cup. Two matches in 1986, one in 1990 and three in 1994, including the second round match between Bulgaria and Mexico. He also supervised a single game between Argentina and Ivory Coast in 1992 King Fahd Cup, The first edition of FIFA Confederations Cup in Saudi Arabia. He also officiated at the 1988 Olympics. He worked for beIN Sports channels as an analyst from the opening of the channel in 2003 until 2020.

Preceded by AFC Asian Cup Final 1988 (France) Michel Vautrot	AFC Asian Cup Final Referees; 1992 (Syria) Jamal Al Sharif	Succeeded by AFC Asian Cup Final 1996 (Malaysia) Mohd. Nazri Abdullah
