= Hamid Alidoosti =

Iranian footballer (1956–2026)

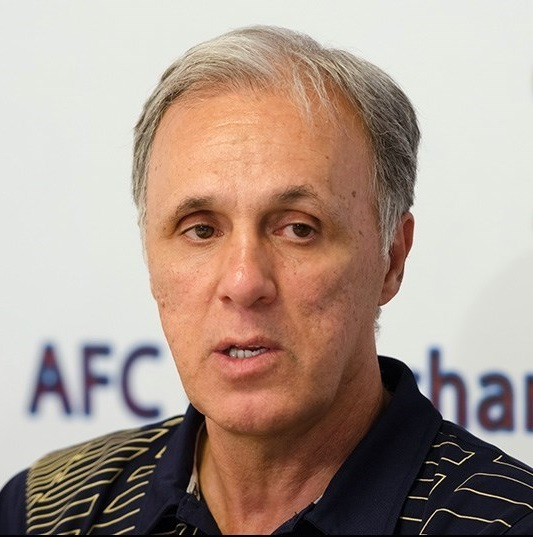
- Alidoosti in 2015

Personal information
- Date of birth: 12 March 1956
- Place of birth: Tehran, Iran
- Date of death: 1 November 2026 (aged 70)
- Place of death: Tehran, Iran
- Position: Midfielder

Youth career
- 1971–1975: Tehran Javan

Senior career*
Years	Team	Apps	(Gls)
1975–1986	Homa		
1986–1987	FSV Salmrohr	30	(10)
1987–1991	Daraei		
1991–1993	Keshavarz		
1993–1995	Saipa		

International career
1977–1986	Iran	27	(15)

Managerial career
- 2000–2001: Paykan
- 2001–2002: Saipa
- 2002: Homa
- 2003–2004: Tractor Sazi
- 2004: Iran U-20
- 2004–2006: Iran U-17
- 2006–2008: Sorkhpooshan
- 2010–2011: Paykan
- 2025–2026: Chadormalou Ardakan (team manager)
- * Club domestic league appearances and goals

Hamid Alidoosti (Persian: حمید علیدوستی, Persian pronunciation: [hæˈmiːd ʔæˌliː‿duːsˈtiː]; 12 March 1956 – 1 November 2026) was an Iranian football coach and player.

== Playing career ==
Alidoosti played for the Iranian club Homa FC for most of his career, and also appeared with FSV Salmrohr in Germany. He was a member of the Iran national team in the late 1970s and early 1980s.

== Managerial career ==
Alidoosti served as coach for several clubs in Iran, including Homa FC, Paykan FC (2000–2002), and Tractor Sazi (2003–2004). He also coached the Iran U20 national team (2004).

== Personal life and death ==
His daughter, Taraneh, is an actress. His son, Pouyan, died in an accident during the annual Iranian Fire Festival (Chaharshanbe Suri), in March 2005 at the age of 16.

Alidoosti died at a hospital in Tehran of cardiac arrest complicated by prostate and bone cancer on 1 November 2026, aged 70.

== Career statistics ==
Appearances and goals by club, season and competition
Club	Season	League			Cup		Other		Total	
Club	Season	Division	Apps	Goals	Apps	Goals	Apps	Goals	Apps	Goals
FSV Salmrohr	1986–87	2. Bundesliga	30	10	2	0	—		32	10
Career total			30	10	2	0	—		32	10
