= Pak Jong-hun =

North Korean footballer

Personal information
- Date of birth: 10 March 1948 (age 78)
- Position: Midfielder

International career
Years	Team	Apps	(Gls)
- North Korea

- Pak Jong-hun
- Hangul: 박정훈
- RR: Bak Jeonghun
- MR: Pak Chŏnghun

Pak Jong-hun (born 10 March 1948) is a North Korean former footballer. He competed in the men's tournament at the 1976 Summer Olympics.
