= 1982 FIFA World Cup Group 4 =

Football tournament group stage

Group 4 was one of six groups of national teams competing in the group stage of the 1982 FIFA World Cup. Play began on 16 June and ended on 25 June 1982. The group consisted of four teams: Seeded team England, France, Czechoslovakia and World Cup debutants Kuwait.

England won the group after three successive victories and advanced to the second round, along with France.

== Standings ==
Pos	Team	Pld	W	D	L	GF	GA	GD	Pts	Qualification
1	England	3	3	0	0	6	1	+5	6	Advance to second round
2	France	3	1	1	1	6	5	+1	3	Advance to second round
3	Czechoslovakia	3	0	2	1	2	4	−2	2	
4	Kuwait	3	0	1	2	2	6	−4	1	

Source: FIFA

== Matches ==
=== England vs France ===
16 June 1982
17:15 CEST

England	3–1	France
Robson 1', 67'; Mariner 83'		Soler 24'

San Mamés, Bilbao
Attendance: 44,172
Referee: António Garrido (Portugal)

England	France

GK	22	Peter Shilton
RB	12	Mick Mills (c)
CB	18	Phil Thompson
CB	4	Terry Butcher	(yellow card) 34'
LB	17	Kenny Sansom		(substituted off) 90'
RM	5	Steve Coppell
CM	19	Ray Wilkins
CM	16	Bryan Robson
LM	15	Graham Rix
CF	8	Trevor Francis
CF	11	Paul Mariner
Substitutes:
GK	1	Ray Clemence
MF	9	Glenn Hoddle
DF	14	Phil Neal		(substituted on) 90'
FW	20	Peter Withe
FW	21	Tony Woodcock
Manager:
Ron Greenwood

GK	22	Jean-Luc Ettori
SW	8	Marius Trésor
DF	3	Patrick Battiston
DF	6	Christian Lopez
DF	4	Maxime Bossis
MF	11	René Girard
MF	12	Alain Giresse
MF	13	Jean-François Larios	(substituted off) 74'
MF	10	Michel Platini (c)
FW	18	Dominique Rocheteau	(substituted off) 71'
FW	20	Gérard Soler
Substitutes:
GK	1	Dominique Baratelli
DF	5	Gérard Janvion
MF	14	Jean Tigana	(substituted on) 74'
FW	16	Alain Couriol
FW	19	Didier Six	(substituted on) 71'
Manager:
Michel Hidalgo

Assistant referees:
Gastón Castro (Chile)
Arnaldo Cézar Coelho (Brazil)

=== Czechoslovakia vs Kuwait ===
17 June 1982
17:15 CEST

Czechoslovakia	1–1	Kuwait
Panenka 21' (pen.)		Al-Dakhil 57'

Estadio José Zorrilla, Valladolid
Attendance: 25,000
Referee: Benjamin Dwomoh (Ghana)

Czechoslovakia	Kuwait

GK	21	Zdeněk Hruška
SW	4	Ladislav Jurkemik
DF	5	Jozef Barmoš
DF	3	Jan Fiala
DF	15	Jozef Kukučka
MF	8	Antonín Panenka
MF	13	Jan Berger
MF	10	Tomáš Kříž	(substituted off) 61'
FW	18	Petr Janečka	(substituted off) 68'
FW	11	Zdeněk Nehoda (c)
FW	9	Ladislav Vízek
Substitutes:
GK	1	Stanislav Seman
MF	12	Přemysl Bičovský	(substituted on) 61'
DF	14	Libor Radimec
MF	16	Pavel Chaloupka
FW	20	Vlastimil Petržela	(substituted on) 68'
Manager:
Jozef Vengloš

GK	1	Ahmed Al-Tarabulsi
SW	2	Naeem Saad
DF	3	Mahboub Juma'a
DF	14	Abdullah Mayouf
DF	5	Waleed Al-Jasem
MF	8	Abdullah Al-Buloushi
FW	6	Saad Al-Houti (c)
MF	18	Mohammed Karam	(substituted off) 57'
FW	10	Abdulaziz Al-Anberi
FW	9	Jasem Yaqoub
FW	16	Faisal Al-Dakhil
Substitutes:
GK	21	Adam Marjan
DF	4	Jamal Al-Qabendi
FW	7	Fathi Kameel	(substituted on) 57'
MF	12	Yussef Al-Suwayed
DF	17	Hamoud Al-Shemmari
Manager:
(Brazil) Carlos Alberto Parreira

Assistant referees:
Rómulo Méndez (Guatemala)
Bob Valentine (Scotland)

=== England vs Czechoslovakia ===
20 June 1982
17:15 CEST

England	2–0	Czechoslovakia
Francis 62'; Barmoš 66' (o.g.)

San Mamés, Bilbao
Attendance: 41,123
Referee: Charles Corver (Netherlands)

England	Czechoslovakia

GK	22	Peter Shilton
RB	12	Mick Mills (c)
CB	18	Phil Thompson
CB	4	Terry Butcher
LB	17	Kenny Sansom
RM	5	Steve Coppell
CM	19	Ray Wilkins
CM	16	Bryan Robson	(substituted off) 46'
LM	15	Graham Rix
CF	8	Trevor Francis
CF	11	Paul Mariner
Substitutes:
GK	1	Ray Clemence
MF	9	Glenn Hoddle	(substituted on) 46'
DF	14	Phil Neal
FW	20	Peter Withe
FW	21	Tony Woodcock
Manager:
Ron Greenwood

GK	1	Stanislav Seman		(substituted off) 75'
SW	14	Libor Radimec
DF	3	Jan Fiala
DF	6	Rostislav Vojáček
DF	5	Jozef Barmoš
MF	4	Ladislav Jurkemik
MF	16	Pavel Chaloupka	(yellow card) 40'
MF	13	Jan Berger
FW	9	Ladislav Vízek
FW	11	Zdeněk Nehoda (c)
FW	18	Petr Janečka		(substituted off) 77'
Substitutes:
GK	22	Karel Stromšík		(substituted on) 75'
MF	8	Antonín Panenka
MF	17	František Štambachr
FW	19	Marián Masný		(substituted on) 77'
FW	20	Vlastimil Petržela
Manager:
Jozef Vengloš

Assistant referees:
Bogdan Dochev (Bulgaria)
Gilberto Aristizábal (Colombia)

=== France vs Kuwait ===
21 June 1982
17:15 CEST

France	4–1	Kuwait
Genghini 31'; Platini 43'; Six 48'; Bossis 89'		A.M. Al-Buloushi 75'

Estadio José Zorrilla, Valladolid
Attendance: 30,043
Referee: Myroslav Stupar (Soviet Union)

France	Kuwait

GK	22	Jean-Luc Ettori
DF	2	Manuel Amoros	(yellow card) 68'
DF	8	Marius Trésor
DF	5	Gérard Janvion		(substituted off) 59'
DF	4	Maxime Bossis
MF	9	Bernard Genghini
MF	10	Michel Platini (c)		(substituted off) 81'
MF	12	Alain Giresse
FW	20	Gérard Soler
FW	17	Bernard Lacombe
FW	19	Didier Six
Substitutes:
GK	21	Jean Castaneda
DF	6	Christian Lopez		(substituted on) 59'
MF	11	René Girard		(substituted on) 81'
MF	15	Bruno Bellone
FW	16	Alain Couriol
Manager:
Michel Hidalgo

GK	1	Ahmed Al-Tarabulsi
DF	2	Naeem Saad
DF	14	Abdullah Mayouf
DF	3	Mahboub Juma'a
DF	5	Waleed Al-Jasem		(substituted off) 78'
MF	6	Saad Al-Houti (c)
MF	8	Abdullah Al-Buloushi
MF	18	Mohammed Karam		(substituted off) 46'
FW	10	Abdulaziz Al-Anberi	(yellow card) 30'
FW	9	Jasem Yaqoub
FW	16	Faisal Al-Dakhil
Substitutes:
GK	21	Adam Marjan
DF	4	Jamal Al-Qabendi
FW	7	Fathi Kameel	(yellow card) 85'	(substituted on) 46'
MF	12	Yussef Al-Suwayed
DF	17	Hamoud Al-Shemmari		(substituted on) 78'
Manager:
(Brazil) Carlos Alberto Parreira

Assistant referees:
Erik Fredriksson (Sweden)
Damir Matovinović (Yugoslavia)

=== France vs Czechoslovakia ===
24 June 1982
17:15 CEST

France	1–1	Czechoslovakia
Six 66'		Panenka 84' (pen.)

Estadio José Zorrilla, Valladolid
Attendance: 28,000
Referee: Paolo Casarin (Italy)

France	Czechoslovakia

GK	22	Jean-Luc Ettori
DF	2	Manuel Amoros	(yellow card) 47'
DF	8	Marius Trésor
DF	5	Gérard Janvion
DF	4	Maxime Bossis
MF	9	Bernard Genghini
MF	12	Alain Giresse
MF	10	Michel Platini (c)
FW	20	Gérard Soler		(substituted off) 89'
FW	17	Bernard Lacombe		(substituted off) 70'
FW	19	Didier Six
Substitutes:
GK	21	Jean Castaneda
DF	6	Christian Lopez
MF	11	René Girard		(substituted on) 89'
MF	15	Bruno Bellone
FW	16	Alain Couriol		(substituted on) 70'
Manager:
Michel Hidalgo

GK	22	Karel Stromšík
DF	5	Jozef Barmoš
DF	6	Rostislav Vojáček
DF	3	Jan Fiala
DF	17	František Štambachr
MF	12	Přemysl Bičovský
MF	14	Libor Radimec
MF	11	Zdeněk Nehoda (c)
FW	18	Petr Janečka		(substituted off) 70'
FW	9	Ladislav Vízek	(red card) 87'
FW	10	Tomáš Kříž		(substituted off) 31'
Substitutes:
GK	21	Zdeněk Hruška
MF	4	Ladislav Jurkemik
MF	8	Antonín Panenka	(yellow card) 83'	(substituted on) 70'
DF	15	Jozef Kukučka
FW	19	Marián Masný		(substituted on) 31'
Manager:
Jozef Vengloš

Assistant referees:
Benjamin Dwomoh (Ghana)
Károly Palotai (Hungary)

=== England vs Kuwait ===
25 June 1982
17:15 CEST

England	1–0	Kuwait
Francis 27'

San Mamés, Bilbao
Attendance: 39,700
Referee: Gilberto Aristizábal (Colombia)

England	Kuwait

GK	22	Peter Shilton
RB	14	Phil Neal
CB	18	Phil Thompson
CB	6	Steve Foster
LB	12	Mick Mills (c)
RM	5	Steve Coppell
CM	9	Glenn Hoddle
CM	19	Ray Wilkins
LM	15	Graham Rix
CF	8	Trevor Francis
CF	11	Paul Mariner	(yellow card) 43'
Substitutes:
GK	1	Ray Clemence
DF	2	Viv Anderson
MF	10	Terry McDermott
FW	20	Peter Withe
FW	21	Tony Woodcock
Manager:
Ron Greenwood

GK	1	Ahmed Al-Tarabulsi
DF	2	Naeem Saad	(yellow card) 44'
DF	14	Abdullah Mayouf
DF	3	Mahboub Juma'a
DF	5	Waleed Al-Jasem		(substituted off) 76'
MF	8	Abdullah Al-Buloushi
MF	6	Saad Al-Houti (c)
MF	7	Fathi Kameel
MF	10	Abdulaziz Al-Anberi
FW	16	Faisal Al-Dakhil
FW	12	Yussef Al-Suwayed
Substitutes:
GK	21	Adam Marjan
DF	4	Jamal Al-Qabendi
DF	17	Hamoud Al-Shemmari		(substituted on) 76'
MF	18	Mohammed Karam
FW	19	Muayad Al-Haddad
Manager:
(Brazil) Carlos Alberto Parreira

Assistant referees:
Henning Lund-Sørensen (Denmark)
José Luis García Carrión (Spain)

== See also ==
- Czech Republic at the FIFA World Cup
- England at the FIFA World Cup
- France at the FIFA World Cup
- Kuwait at the FIFA World Cup
- Slovakia at the FIFA World Cup
