= Kuwait at the FIFA World Cup =

International football delegation

Kuwait have appeared in the finals of the FIFA World Cup on one occasion in 1982. They were eliminated in round one, where they lost two matches and drew one. The team scored two goals and conceded six across the three games.

== Overall record ==
FIFA World Cup record
Year	Round	Pld	W	D	L	GF	GA
(Uruguay) 1930 to (Mexico) 1970	Did not enter						
(West Germany) 1974 and (Argentina) 1978	Did not qualify						
(Spain) 1982	First group stage	3	0	1	2	2	6
(Mexico) 1986 to (Brazil) 2014	Did not qualify						
(Russia) 2018	Disqualified						
(Qatar) 2022 and (Canada) (Mexico) (United States) 2026	Did not qualify						
(Morocco) (Portugal) (Spain) 2030	To be determined						
(Saudi Arabia) 2034	To be determined						
Total	1/23	3	0	1	2	2	6

== By match ==
Year	Round	Opponents	Score	Kuwait scorers
(Spain) 1982	Group 4	Czechoslovakia	1–1	Faisal Al-Dakhil
(Spain) 1982	Group 4	France	1–4	Abdullah Al-Buloushi
(Spain) 1982	Group 4	England	0–1	—

== Kuwait at Spain 1982 ==
=== Group 4 ===
Team	Pld	W	D	L	GF	GA	GD	Pts
England	3	3	0	0	6	1	+5	6
France	3	1	1	1	6	5	+1	4
Czechoslovakia	3	0	2	1	2	4	−2	2
Kuwait	3	0	1	2	2	6	−4	1

17 June 1982
17:15 CEST

Czechoslovakia	1–1	Kuwait
Panenka 21' (pen.)	(Report)	Al-Dakhil 57'

Estadio José Zorrilla, Valladolid
Attendance: 25,000
Referee: Benjamin Dwomoh (Ghana)

21 June 1982
17:15 CEST

France	4–1	Kuwait
Genghini 31'; Platini 43'; Six 48'; Bossis 89'	(Report)	Al-Buloushi 75'

Estadio José Zorrilla, Valladolid
Attendance: 30,043
Referee: Miroslav Stupar (Soviet Union)

25 June 1982
17:15 CEST

England	1–0	Kuwait
Francis 27'	(Report)

Estadio San Mamés, Bilbao
Attendance: 39,700
Referee: Gilberto Aristízabal (Colombia)

== Record players ==
Coach Parreira fielded his first-choice players during Kuwait's three matches, resulting in ten players sharing the record for Kuwait's player with the most FIFA World Cup matches.

Rank	Player	Matches
1	Abdulaziz Al-Anberi	3
1	Abdullah Al-Buloushi	3
1	Faisal Al-Dakhil	3
1	Saad Al-Houti	3
1	Waleed Al-Jasem	3
1	Ahmed Al-Tarabulsi	3
1	Mahboub Juma'a	3
1	Fathi Kameel	3
1	Abdullah Mayouf	3
1	Naeem Saad	3

=== Goalscorers ===
Two Kuwaiti players scored one goal each during the 1982 FIFA World Cup.

Rank	Player	Goals
1	Faisal Al-Dakhil	1
1	Abdullah Al-Buloushi	1

== See also ==
- Asian nations at the FIFA World Cup
- Kuwait at the AFC Asian Cup
