= Kuwait at the AFC Asian Cup =

Kuwait is one of the most successful teams in the AFC Asian Cup, having won the title once, during the 1980 edition which they were awarded as host, becoming the first Arab team to win the Asian Cup.

During 1970s to 2000s, Kuwait had risen from a normal, unknown to become one of Asia's most prestigious teams and Kuwait was regarded for having a group of golden generation that would facilitate and develop football among the Arab Persian Gulf states. Kuwait had also qualified for the FIFA World Cup once, in 1982, thanked for the success in Asian Cup. Kuwait remained a powerful team until 2004, when they were surprisingly knocked out from the group stage. Since then, Kuwait's strength has started to diminish slowly, and although had qualified for 2011 and 2015, Kuwait didn't win any matches. Kuwait was even excluded for 2019 edition, due to FIFA's sanctions over Government's interference.

== Overall record ==
AFC Asian Cup record									Qualification record					
Year	Result	Position	Pld	W	D*	L	GF	GA	Pld	W	D	L	GF	GA
(Hong Kong) 1956	Did not enter								Did not enter					
(South Korea) 1960	Did not enter								Did not enter					
(Israel) 1964	Did not enter								Did not enter					
(Iran) 1968	Withdrew								Withdrew					
(Thailand) 1972	Group stage	5th	3	2	0	1	4	5	3	1	1	1	3	3
(Iran) 1976	Runners-up	2nd	4	3	0	1	6	3	Qualified by default					
(Kuwait) 1980	Champions	1st	6	4	1	1	13	6	Qualified as hosts					
(Singapore) 1984	Third place	3rd	6	2	2	2	5	4	Qualified as defending champions					
(Qatar) 1988	Group stage	7th	4	0	3	1	2	3	4	3	1	0	9	0
(Japan) 1992	Did not qualify								2	1	0	1	4	3
(United Arab Emirates) 1996	Fourth place	4th	6	2	2	2	9	7	4	2	2	0	9	5
(Lebanon) 2000	Quarter-finals	6th	4	1	2	1	3	3	4	4	0	0	33	1
(China) 2004	Group stage	10th	3	1	0	2	3	7	6	5	1	0	17	5
(Indonesia) (Malaysia) (Thailand) (Vietnam) 2007	Did not qualify								4	1	1	2	3	4
(Qatar) 2011	Group stage	14th	3	0	0	3	1	7	6	2	3	1	6	5
(Australia) 2015	Group stage	15th	3	0	0	3	1	6	6	2	3	1	10	7
(United Arab Emirates) 2019	Disqualified								8	3	1	4	12	10
(Qatar) 2023	Did not qualify								11	5	2	4	24	13
(Saudi Arabia) 2027	Qualified								6	2	1	3	6	6
Total	Best: Champions	11/19	42	15	10	17	47	51	66	32	17	17	139	63

== Head-to-head record ==
Opponent	Pld	W	D	L	GF	GA	GD	Win %
Australia	1	0	0	1	1	4	−3	0.00
Bahrain	1	0	1	0	0	0	+0	0.00
China	5	1	2	2	3	5	−2	20.00
Indonesia	2	0	2	0	2	2	+0	0.00
Iran	4	1	2	1	4	4	+0	25.00
Iraq	1	1	0	0	3	2	+1	100.00
Japan	1	1	0	0	2	0	+2	100.00
Jordan	1	0	0	1	0	2	−2	0.00
Khmer Republic	1	0	0	1	0	4	−4	0.00
Malaysia	2	2	0	0	5	1	+4	100.00
Oman	1	0	0	1	0	1	−1	0.00
Qatar	3	2	0	1	5	3	+2	66.67
Saudi Arabia	3	0	1	2	2	4	−2	0.00
South Korea	8	4	1	3	8	9	−1	50.00
Syria	2	1	0	1	3	2	+1	50.00
Thailand	1	1	0	0	2	0	+2	100.00
United Arab Emirates	4	1	1	2	6	6	+0	25.00
Uzbekistan	1	0	0	1	1	2	−1	0.00
Total	42	15	10	17	47	51	−4	35.71

== 1972 edition in Thailand ==
=== Group allocation match ===
8 May 1972

Thailand	0–2	Kuwait
		Khalaf 42'; Marzouq 87'

National Stadium, Bangkok

=== Group B ===
Team	Pld	W	D	L	GF	GA	GD	Pts
South Korea	2	1	0	1	5	3	+2	2
Khmer Republic	2	1	0	1	5	4	+1	2
Kuwait	2	1	0	1	2	5	−3	2

12 May 1972

South Korea	1–2	Kuwait
Park Lee-chun 2' (pen.)		Sultan 25'; Duraiham 73'

National Stadium, Bangkok

14 May 1972

Khmer Republic	4–0	Kuwait
Doeur Sokhom 23'; Sok Sun Hean 56'; Tes Sean 59'; Sea Cheng Eang 80'

National Stadium, Bangkok

== 1976 edition in Iran ==
=== Group A ===
Team	Pld	W	D	L	GF	GA	GD	Pts
Kuwait	2	2	0	0	3	0	+3	4
China	2	0	1	1	1	2	−1	1
Malaysia	2	0	1	1	1	3	−2	1

3 June 1976

Kuwait	2–0	Malaysia
Al-Anberi 10'; Al-Dakhil 42'

Reza Pahlavi Stadium, Tabriz

7 June 1976

Kuwait	1–0	China
Kameel 1'

Reza Pahlavi Stadium, Tabriz

=== Semi-finals ===
11 June 1976

Kuwait	3–2 (a.e.t.)	Iraq
Ibrahim 11'; Kameel 77', 100'		Abdul-Jalil 46'; Hassan 85'

Aryamehr Stadium, Tehran
Attendance: 60,000

=== Final ===
13 June 1976

Iran	1–0	Kuwait
Parvin 71'

Aryamehr Stadium, Tehran
Attendance: 100,000
Referee: Jean Dubach (Switzerland)

== 1980 edition in Kuwait ==
=== Group B ===
Team	Pld	W	D	L	GF	GA	GD	Pts
South Korea	4	3	1	0	10	2	+8	7
Kuwait	4	2	1	1	8	5	+3	5
Malaysia	4	1	2	1	5	5	0	4
Qatar	4	1	1	2	3	8	−5	3
United Arab Emirates	4	0	1	3	3	9	−6	1

15 September 1980

United Arab Emirates	1–1	Kuwait
Chombi 35'		Al-Houti 19'

Sabah Al-Salem Stadium, Kuwait City
Attendance: 20,000

18 September 1980

Kuwait	3–1	Malaysia
Kameel 20'; Yaqoub 53' (pen.), 77' (pen.)		Zulkifli 44'

Sabah Al-Salem Stadium, Kuwait City
Attendance: 20,000

21 September 1980
16:30

Kuwait	0–3	South Korea
		Hwang Seok-keun 47'; Choi Soon-ho 71', 78'

Sabah Al-Salem Stadium, Kuwait City
Attendance: 20,000
Referee: Toshikazu Sano (Japan)

25 September 1980

Kuwait	4–0	Qatar
Al-Dakhil 32', 57'; Yaqoub 50' (pen.); Al-Anberi 66'

Sabah Al-Salem Stadium, Kuwait City
Attendance: 20,000

=== Semi-finals ===
28 September 1980

Iran	1–2	Kuwait
Faraki 90'		Yaqoub 63'; Al-Dakhil 85'

Sabah Al-Salem Stadium, Kuwait City
Attendance: 20,000
Referee: Kok Lee (Singapore)

=== Final ===
30 September 1980
18:30

Kuwait	3–0	South Korea
Al-Houti 8'; Al-Dakhil 34', 69'

Sabah Al-Salem Stadium, Kuwait City
Attendance: 25,000
Referee: Sudarso Hardjowasito (Indonesia)

== 1984 edition in Singapore ==
=== Group A ===
Team	Pld	W	D	L	GF	GA	GD	Pts
Saudi Arabia	4	2	2	0	4	2	+2	6
Kuwait	4	2	1	1	4	2	+2	5
Qatar	4	1	2	1	3	3	0	4
Syria	4	1	1	2	3	5	−2	3
South Korea	4	0	2	2	1	3	−2	2

3 December 1984
21:00

Kuwait	1–0	Qatar
Al-Rumaihi 52' (o.g.)

National Stadium, Singapore
Attendance: 19,000
Referee: Augusto Lamo (Spain)

5 December 1984
19:00

South Korea	0–0	Kuwait

National Stadium, Singapore
Attendance: 20,000
Referee: Cheung Kwok Kui (Hong Kong)

9 December 1984
19:00

Kuwait	3–1	Syria
Mahrous 66' (o.g.); Al-Dakhil 77'; A. Al-Buloushi 79'		Abu Al-Sel 5'

National Stadium, Singapore
Attendance: 8,000
Referee: Cheung Kwok Kui (Hong Kong)

11 December 1984
21:00

Kuwait	0–1	Saudi Arabia
		Al-Jam'an 88'

National Stadium, Singapore
Attendance: 5,000
Referee: Toshikazu Sano (Japan)

=== Semi-finals ===
14 December 1984
20:00

China	1–0 (a.e.t.)	Kuwait
Li Huayun 108'

National Stadium, Singapore
Attendance: 20,000
Referee: Augusto Lamo (Spain)

=== Third place play-off ===
16 December 1984
18:00

Iran	1–1	Kuwait
Mohammadkhani 80'		Al-Haddad 26'
Penalties
Hajiloo (penalty scored); Derakhshan (penalty scored); Ahadi (penalty scored); Mokhtarifar (penalty missed)	3–5	(penalty scored) Al-Dakhil; (penalty scored) Al-Suwayed; (penalty scored) Juma'a; (penalty scored) Al-Jasem; (penalty scored) Al-Qabendi

National Stadium, Singapore
Attendance: 26,000
Referee: Antonio Márquez (Mexico)

== 1988 edition in Qatar ==
=== Group B ===
Team	Pld	W	D	L	GF	GA	GD	Pts
Saudi Arabia	4	2	2	0	4	1	+3	6
China	4	2	1	1	6	3	+3	5
Syria	4	2	0	2	2	5	−3	4
Kuwait	4	0	3	1	2	3	−1	3
Bahrain	4	0	2	2	1	3	−2	2

3 December 1988
17:00

Kuwait	0–0	Bahrain
	Report

Al-Ahly Stadium, Doha
Referee: Vincent Mauro (United States)

5 December 1988
15:00

Saudi Arabia	0–0	Kuwait
	Report

Al-Ahly Stadium, Doha
Referee: Michel Vautrot (France)

8 December 1988
17:00

Syria	1–0	Kuwait
Al-Nasser 63'	Report

Al-Ahly Stadium, Doha
Referee: Yusuf Namoğlu (Turkey)

10 December 1988
17:00

Kuwait	2–2	China
Adel Abbas 60' (pen.); Mansour Basha 62'	Report	Ma Lin 10', 87'

Al-Ahly Stadium, Doha
Referee: Erik Fredriksson (Sweden)

== 1996 edition in the UAE ==
=== Group A ===
Team	Pld	W	D	L	GF	GA	GD	Pts
United Arab Emirates	3	2	1	0	6	3	+3	7
Kuwait	3	1	1	1	6	5	+1	4
South Korea	3	1	1	1	5	5	0	4
Indonesia	3	0	1	2	4	8	−4	1

4 December 1996
18:45

Indonesia	2–2	Kuwait
Putro 20'; Wabia 40'	Report	Al-Saqer 73'; Haji 84' (pen.)

Sheikh Zayed Stadium, Abu Dhabi
Attendance: 15,000
Referee: Jamal Al Sharif (Syria)

7 December 1996
16:45

United Arab Emirates	3–2	Kuwait
Saeed 53'; Al-Talyani 55'; B. Saad 80'	Report	Al-Huwaidi 9', 44'

Sheikh Zayed Stadium, Abu Dhabi
Attendance: 15,000
Referee: Charles Massembe (Uganda)

10 December 1996
19:00

Kuwait	2–0	South Korea
Al-Huwaidi 60'; B. Abdullah 87'	Report

Sheikh Zayed Stadium, Abu Dhabi
Attendance: 3,000
Referee: Mohd Nazri Abdullah (Malaysia)

=== Quarter-finals ===
15 December 1996
19:30

Kuwait	2–0	Japan
Al-Huwaidi 17', 54'	Report

Tahnoun bin Mohammed Stadium, Al Ain
Attendance: 2,000
Referee: Pirom Un-Prasert (Thailand)

=== Semi-finals ===
19 December 1996
16:45

United Arab Emirates	1–0	Kuwait
Saeed 69'	Report

Sheikh Zayed Stadium, Abu Dhabi
Attendance: 55,000
Referee: Masayoshi Okada (Japan)

=== Third place play-off ===
21 December 1996
16:45

Iran	1–1	Kuwait
Daei 40'	Report	Al-Huwaidi 15'
Penalties
Moharrami (penalty missed); Estili (penalty scored); Peyrovani (penalty scored); Bagheri (penalty scored)	3–2	(penalty scored) Badr Haji; (penalty scored) Bashar Abdullah; (penalty missed) Al-Lenqawi; (penalty missed) Abdulrahman; (penalty missed) Al-Huwaidi

Sheikh Zayed Stadium, Abu Dhabi
Attendance: 60,000
Referee: Kim Young-Joo (Korea Republic)

== 2000 edition in Lebanon ==
=== Group B ===
Team	Pld	W	D	L	GF	GA	GD	Pts
China	3	1	2	0	6	2	+4	5
Kuwait	3	1	2	0	1	0	+1	5
South Korea	3	1	1	1	5	3	+2	4
Indonesia	3	0	1	2	0	7	−7	1

13 October 2000
19:45

Kuwait	0–0	Indonesia
	Report

International Olympic Stadium, Tripoli
Attendance: 2,000
Referee: Tajaddin Fares (Syria)

16 October 2000
19:45

South Korea	0–1	Kuwait
	Report	Al-Huwaidi 43'

International Olympic Stadium, Tripoli
Attendance: 5,000
Referee: Brian Hall (United States)

19 October 2000
19:30

China	0–0	Kuwait
	Report

International Olympic Stadium, Tripoli
Attendance: 5,000
Referee: Shamsul Maidin (Singapore)

=== Quarter-finals ===
24 October 2000
19:45

Kuwait	2–3 (a.e.t.)	Saudi Arabia
Bashar Abdullah 62'; Al-Huwaidi 68'	Report	Al-Temyat 45+1' 109'; Al-Meshal 72'

Sports City Stadium, Beirut
Attendance: 5,000
Referee: Brian Hall (United States)

== 2004 edition in China ==
=== Group B ===
Team	Pld	W	D	L	GF	GA	GD	Pts
South Korea	3	2	1	0	6	0	+6	7
Jordan	3	1	2	0	2	0	+2	5
Kuwait	3	1	0	2	3	7	−4	3
United Arab Emirates	3	0	1	2	1	5	−4	1

19 July 2004
21:00

Kuwait	3–1	United Arab Emirates
B. Abdullah 24'; Al-Mutawa 39' (pen.), 45'	Report	Rashid 47'

Shandong Sports Center, Jinan
Attendance: 31,250
Referee: Naser Al-Hamdan (Saudi Arabia)

23 July 2004
18:30

Jordan	2–0	Kuwait
Saad 90+1'; Al-Zboun 90+2'	Report

Shandong Sports Center, Jinan
Attendance: 28,000
Referee: Lu Jun (China)

27 July 2004
19:00

South Korea	4–0	Kuwait
Lee Dong-gook 25', 41'; Cha Du-ri 45+1'; Ahn Jung-hwan 75'	Report

Shandong Sports Center, Jinan
Attendance: 15,000
Referee: Shamsul Maidin (Singapore)

== 2011 edition in Qatar ==
=== Group A ===
Team	Pld	W	D	L	GF	GA	GD	Pts
Uzbekistan	3	2	1	0	6	3	+3	7
Qatar	3	2	0	1	5	2	+3	6
China	3	1	1	1	4	4	0	4
Kuwait	3	0	0	3	1	7	−6	0

8 January 2011
Kuwait	0–2	China
12 January 2011
Uzbekistan	2–1	Kuwait
16 January 2011
Qatar	3–0	Kuwait

== 2015 edition in Australia ==
=== Group A ===
Pos	Team	Pld	W	D	L	GF	GA	GD	Pts	Qualification
1	South Korea	3	3	0	0	3	0	+3	9	Advance to knockout stage
2	Australia (H)	3	2	0	1	8	2	+6	6	Advance to knockout stage
3	Oman	3	1	0	2	1	5	−4	3	
4	Kuwait	3	0	0	3	1	6	−5	0	

Source: Asian Cup Australia 2015
Rules for classification: Tiebreakers
(H) Hosts

9 January 2015
Australia	4–1	Kuwait	AAMI Park, Melbourne
13 January 2015
Kuwait	0–1	South Korea	Canberra Stadium, Canberra
17 January 2015
Oman	1–0	Kuwait	Newcastle Stadium, Newcastle

== See also ==
- Kuwait at the FIFA World Cup
