= 1980 AFC Asian Cup final =

Soccer match

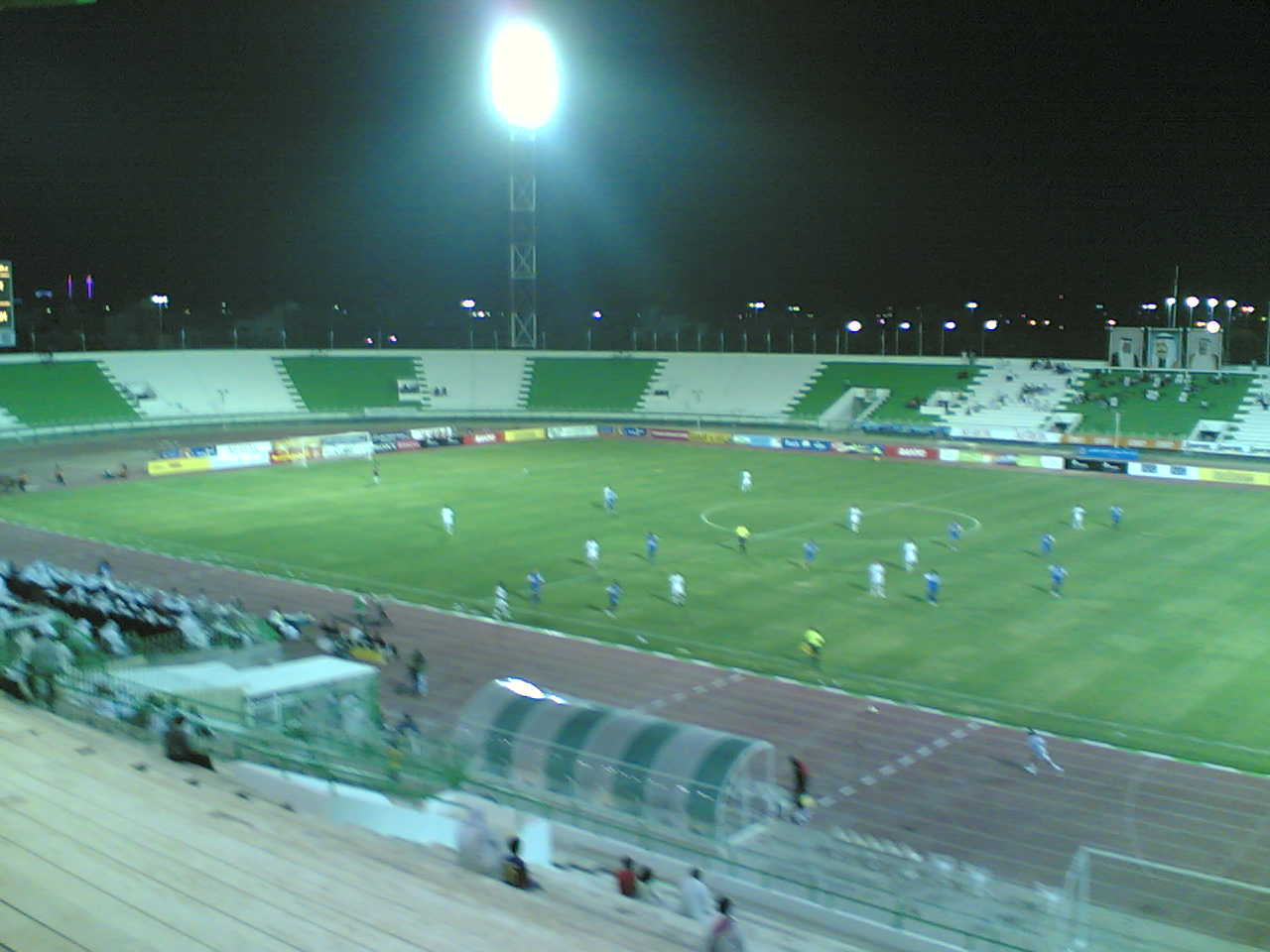
- Sabah Al-Salem Stadium (pictured in 2009) held the final
- Event: 1980 AFC Asian Cup
Kuwait	South Korea
(Kuwait)	(South Korea)
3	0
- Date: 30 September 1980
- Venue: Sabah Al-Salem Stadium, Kuwait City
- Referee: Sudarso Hardjowasito (Indonesia)
- Attendance: 25,000

The 1980 AFC Asian Cup final was a football match that took place on 30 September 1980, at the Sabah Al-Salem Stadium in Kuwait City, Kuwait, to determine the winner of the 1980 AFC Asian Cup. Kuwait defeated South Korea 3–0 with one goal from Al-Houti and two goals from Al-Dakhil, to win their first AFC Asian Cup.

== Background ==
The 1980 AFC Asian Cup was the seventh edition of the AFC Asian Cup, the premier football competition of AFC. Qualification began on 25 December 1978 and ended on 14 May 1979, with Kuwait automatically qualified as hosts.

In the previous edition, South Korea did not qualify, being eliminated by Malaysia and Thailand; while Kuwait automatically qualified due to the withdrawal of four teams in Group 1. Kuwait then took part in the competition and reached the final, before agonisingly lost to Iran 0–1 by a goal from Ali Parvin. This meeting was the first time the two nations faced each other in the final of a continental championship, this were both Kuwait and South Korea's second appearance in an Asian Cup final, with both teams lost to Iran in the two previous finals. However, South Korea had won the tournament in the two first editions when the knockout format was yet issued.

== Venue ==
The Sabah Al Salem Stadium, located in Kuwait City, Kuwait, hosted the 1980 AFC Asian Cup Final. The 15,000-seat stadium was built in 1977. It was only stadium used to host the 1980 Asian Cup; all matches were played in this stadium.

== Route to the final ==
Kuwait
Round
South Korea
Opponents
Result
Group stage
Opponents
Result
United Arab Emirates
1–1
Match 1
Malaysia
1–1
Malaysia
3–1
Match 2
Qatar
2–0
South Korea
0–3
Match 3
Kuwait
3–0
Qatar
4–0
Match 4
United Arab Emirates
4–1
Group B Runners-up

Pos	Team	Pld	Pts
1	South Korea	4	10
2	Kuwait (H)	4	7
3	Malaysia	4	5
4	Qatar	4	4
5	United Arab Emirates	4	1

Source: RSSSF
(H) Hosts
Final standings
Group B winners

Pos	Team	Pld	Pts
1	South Korea	4	10
2	Kuwait (H)	4	7
3	Malaysia	4	5
4	Qatar	4	4
5	United Arab Emirates	4	1

Source: RSSSF
(H) Hosts
Opponents
Result
Knockout stage
Opponents
Result
Iran
2–1
Semi-finals
North Korea
2–1

== Match ==
=== Details ===
30 September 1980
18:30

Kuwait	3–0	South Korea
Al-Houti 8'; Al-Dakhil 34', 69'

Sabah Al-Salem Stadium, Kuwait City
Attendance: 25,000
Referee: Sudarso Hardjowasito (Indonesia)

Kuwait	South Korea

GK	22	Jasem Bahman
DF	2	Naeem Saad
DF	15	Sami Al-Hashash	(substituted off) 83'
DF	4	Jamal Al-Qabendi
DF	3	Mahboub Juma'a
MF	11	Nassir Al-Ghanim
MF	6	Saad Al-Houti (c)
MF	8	Mohammed Karam
FW	16	Faisal Al-Dakhil
FW	9	Jasem Yaqoub
FW	10	Abdulaziz Al-Anberi
Substitution:
DF	14	Hamoud Al-Shemmari	(substituted on) 83'
Manager:
(Brazil) Carlos Alberto Parreira

GK	21	Cho Byung-deuk
DF	12	Choi Jong-duk
DF	3	Hong Sung-ho
DF	8	Cho Young-jeung
DF	13	Chang Woe-ryong	(substituted off) 72'
MF	15	Lee Kang-jo
MF	4	Cho Kwang-rae
MF	18	Hwang Seok-keun
FW	9	Lee Young-moo
FW	22	Choi Soon-ho
FW	16	Chung Hae-won
Substitution:
DF	2	Kim Jong-pil	(substituted on) 72'
Manager:
(South Korea) Kim Jung-nam
