= List of AFC Asian Cup finals =

AFC Asian Cup Final
- Founded: 1956; 70 years ago 1972; 54 years ago (first final)
- Region: Asia (AFC)
- Current champions: Qatar (2nd title)
- Most championships: Japan (4 titles)

The AFC Asian Cup is an association football competition established in 1956. It is contested by the men's national teams of the members of the Asian Football Confederation (AFC), the sport's Asian governing body, and takes place generally every four years. The winners of the first tournament were South Korea, who won in a round-robin style tournament. The first final was in 1972, where Iran defeated South Korea 2–1 after extra time in Bangkok. The most recent final, hosted in Lusail in 2023, saw Qatar defeat Jordan 3–1.

The Asian Cup final is the last match of the competition and the result determines which country's team is declared Asian champion. As of the 2023 tournament, if after 90 minutes of regular play the score is a draw, an additional 30-minute period of play, called extra time, is added. If such a game is still tied after extra time, it is decided by penalty shoot-out. The team that wins the penalty shoot-out are then declared champions. The fourteen finals to-date have produced five matches go into extra-time, and two of those further being determined by a penalty shoot-out. The winners are awarded the Asian Cup trophy.

Japan is the most successful team at the tournament, winning it four times. Iran and Saudi Arabia both have three titles, South Korea and Qatar each have two, and Israel, Kuwait, Iraq and Australia have one a-piece.

== List of finals ==
Key to the list of finals
#	Final not played
†	Final was won during extra time
*	Final decided by a penalty shootout

- The "Year" column refers to the year the Asian Cup tournament was held, and wikilinks to the article about that tournament.
- Links in the "Winners" and "Runners-up" columns point to the articles for the national football teams of the countries, not the articles for the countries.
- The wikilinks in the "Final score" column point to the article about that tournament's final game.

Year	Winners	Score	Runners-up	Venue	Location	Attendance
1956	South Korea	No final	Israel	Round-robin format		
1960	South Korea	No final	Israel	Round-robin format		
1964	Israel	No final	India	Round-robin format		
1968	Iran	No final	Burma	Round-robin format		
1972	Iran	2–1 (Note: Score was 1–1 after 90 minutes.)	South Korea	National Stadium	Bangkok, Thailand	15,000
1976	Iran	1–0	Kuwait	Aryamehr Stadium	Tehran, Iran	100,000
1980	Kuwait	3–0	South Korea	Sabah Al Salem Stadium	Kuwait City, Kuwait	25,000
1984	Saudi Arabia	2–0	China	National Stadium	Singapore	26,000
1988	Saudi Arabia	0–0 (Note: Score was 0–0 after 120 minutes. Saudi Arabia won 4–2 on penalties.)	South Korea	Al-Ahly Stadium	Doha, Qatar	20,000
1992	Japan	1–0	Saudi Arabia	Hiroshima Big Arch	Hiroshima, Japan	60,000
1996	Saudi Arabia	0–0 (Note: Score was 0–0 after 120 minutes. Saudi Arabia won 4–3 on penalties.)	United Arab Emirates	Zayed Sports City Stadium	Abu Dhabi, United Arab Emirates	60,000
2000	Japan	1–0	Saudi Arabia	Sports City Stadium	Beirut, Lebanon	47,400
2004	Japan	3–1	China	Workers' Stadium	Beijing, China	62,000
2007	Iraq	1–0	Saudi Arabia	Gelora Bung Karno Stadium	Jakarta, Indonesia	60,000
2011	Japan	1–0 (Note: Score was 0–0 after 90 minutes.)	Australia	Khalifa International Stadium	Doha, Qatar	37,174
2015	Australia	2–1 (Note: Score was 1–1 after 90 minutes.)	South Korea	Stadium Australia	Sydney, Australia	76,385
2019	Qatar	3–1	Japan	Zayed Sports City Stadium	Abu Dhabi, United Arab Emirates	36,776
2023	Qatar	3–1	Jordan	Lusail Stadium	Lusail, Qatar	86,492
Upcoming finals
Year	Finalists	Match	Finalists	Venue	Location	Attendance
2027		v		King Fahd Sports City	Riyadh, Saudi Arabia	

== Results by nation ==
Results by nation
National team	Winners	Runners-up	Total	Years won	Years runners-up
Japan	4	1	5	1992, 2000, 2004, 2011	2019
Saudi Arabia	3	3	6	1984, 1988, 1996	1992, 2000, 2007
Iran	3	0	3	1968, 1972, 1976	–
South Korea	2	4	6	1956, 1960	1972, 1980, 1988, 2015
Qatar	2	0	2	2019, 2023	–
Israel (Note: Israel was expelled from the AFC in the early 1970s and eventually became a member of UEFA.)	1	2	3	1964	1956, 1960
Kuwait	1	1	2	1980	1976
Australia	1	1	2	2015	2011
Iraq	1	0	1	2007	–
China	0	2	2	–	1984, 2004
United Arab Emirates	0	1	1	–	1996
India	0	1	1	–	1964
Myanmar	0	1	1	–	1968
Jordan	0	1	1	–	2023

== See also ==
- List of FIFA Confederations Cup finals
- List of FIFA World Cup finals
- List of UEFA European Championship finals
- List of Copa América finals
- List of Africa Cup of Nations finals
- List of CONCACAF Gold Cup finals
- List of OFC Nations Cup finals
