= 1976 AFC Asian Cup final =

Association football match

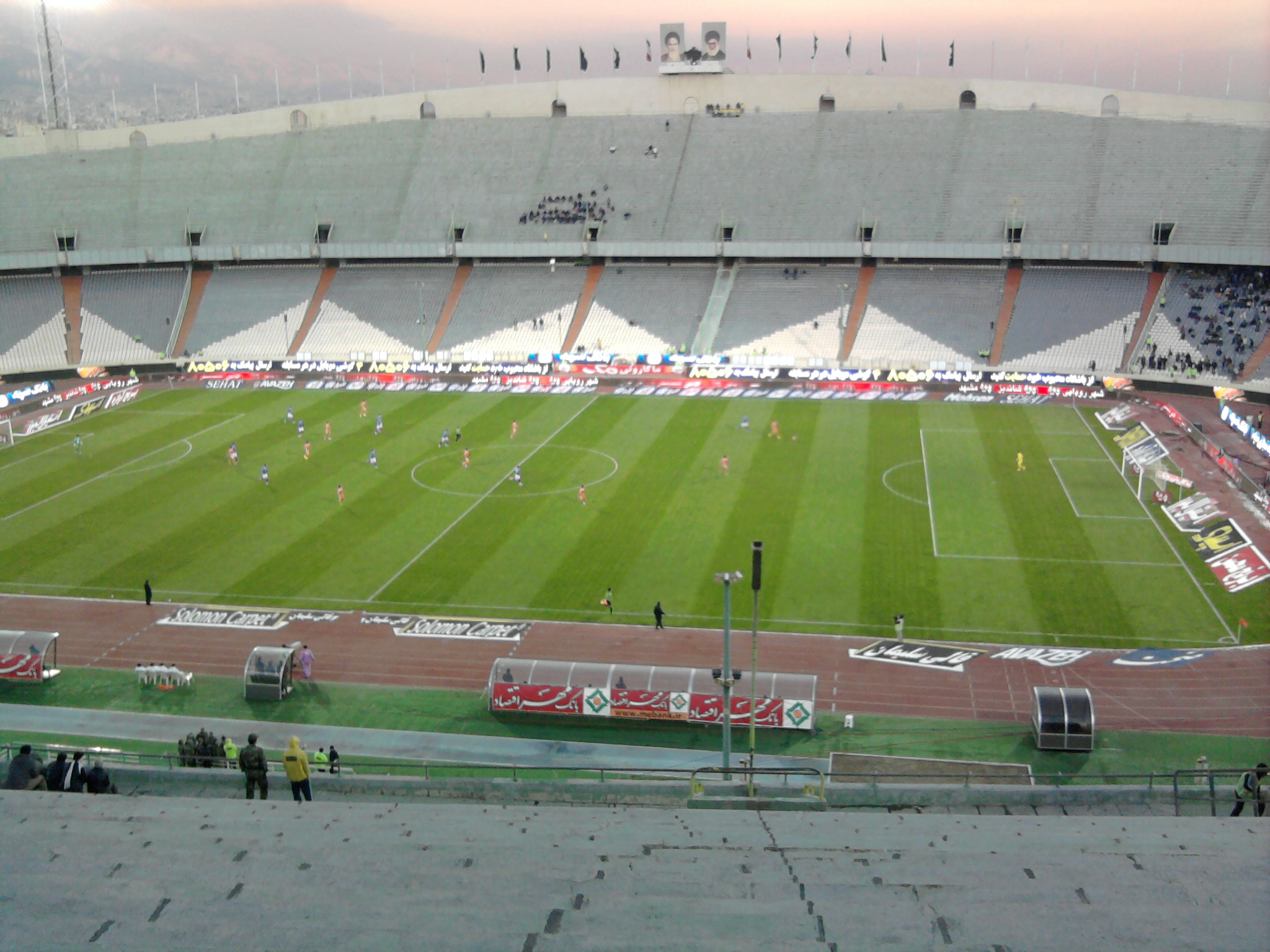
- Aryamehr Stadiym now known as Azadi Stadium (pictured in 2013) held the final
- Event: 1976 AFC Asian Cup
Iran	Kuwait
(Iran)	(Kuwait)
1	0
- Date: 13 June 1976
- Venue: Aryamehr Stadium, Tehran
- Referee: Jean Dubach (Switzerland)
- Attendance: 100,000

The 1976 AFC Asian Cup final was a football match which determined the winner of the 1976 AFC Asian Cup, the 6th edition of the AFC Asian Cup, a quadrennial tournament contested by the men's national teams of the member associations of the Asian Football Confederation. The match was won by Iran, defeating Kuwait 1–0 to win their third AFC Asian Cup.

== Venue ==
The Aryamehr Stadium (now Azadi Stadium), located in Tehran, Iran, hosted the 1976 AFC Asian Cup Final. The 78,116-seat stadium was built in 1971 and is primarily used by the Iran national football team. It was the main stadium used to host the 1976 Asian Cup; seven matches were played in the stadium including the final.

== Route to the final ==
Iran
Round
Kuwait
Opponents
Result
Group stage
Opponents
Result
Iraq
2–0
Match 1
Malaysia
2–0
South Yemen
8–0
Match 2
China
1–0
Group B winners

Pos	Team	Pld	Pts
1	Iran (H)	2	4
2	Iraq	2	2
3	South Yemen	2	0

Source: RSSSF
(H) Hosts
Final standings
Group A winners

Pos	Team	Pld	Pts
1	Kuwait	2	4
2	China	2	1
3	Malaysia	2	1

Source: RSSSF
Opponents
Result
Knockout stage
Opponents
Result
China
2–0 (a.e.t.)
Semi-finals
Iraq
3–2 (a.e.t.)

== Match ==
13 June 1976

Iran	1–0	Kuwait
Parvin 71'	Report

Aryamehr Stadium, Tehran
Attendance: 100,000
Referee: Jean Dubach (Switzerland)

GK
RB
CB
CB
LB
RM
CM
CM
LM
CF
CF
Substitutions:
MF
Manager:
(Iran) Heshmat Mohajerani

Mansour Rashidi
Hassan Nazari
Bijan Zolfagharnasab
Nasrollah Abdollahi
Andranik Eskandarian
Ali Parvin
Parviz Ghelichkhani	capt
Ebrahim Qasempour
Alireza Khorshidi
Nasser Nouraei	(substituted off) 55'
Hassan Rowshan
Gholam Hossein Mazloumi	(substituted on) 55'

GK	Ahmed Al-Tarabulsi
RB	Saleh Al-Asfour
CB	Abdullah Mayouf
CB	Mahboub Juma'a
LB	Ibrahim Al-Dourahim	capt
CM	Faruq Ibrahim
CM	Saad Al-Houti
CM	Hamad Bu-Hamad
RW	Fathi Kameel
CF	Faisal Al-Dakhil
LW	Mohammed Abdullah
Manager:
(Brazil) Mario Zagallo
