= Workers' Stadium (1959) =

Football stadium in Beijing

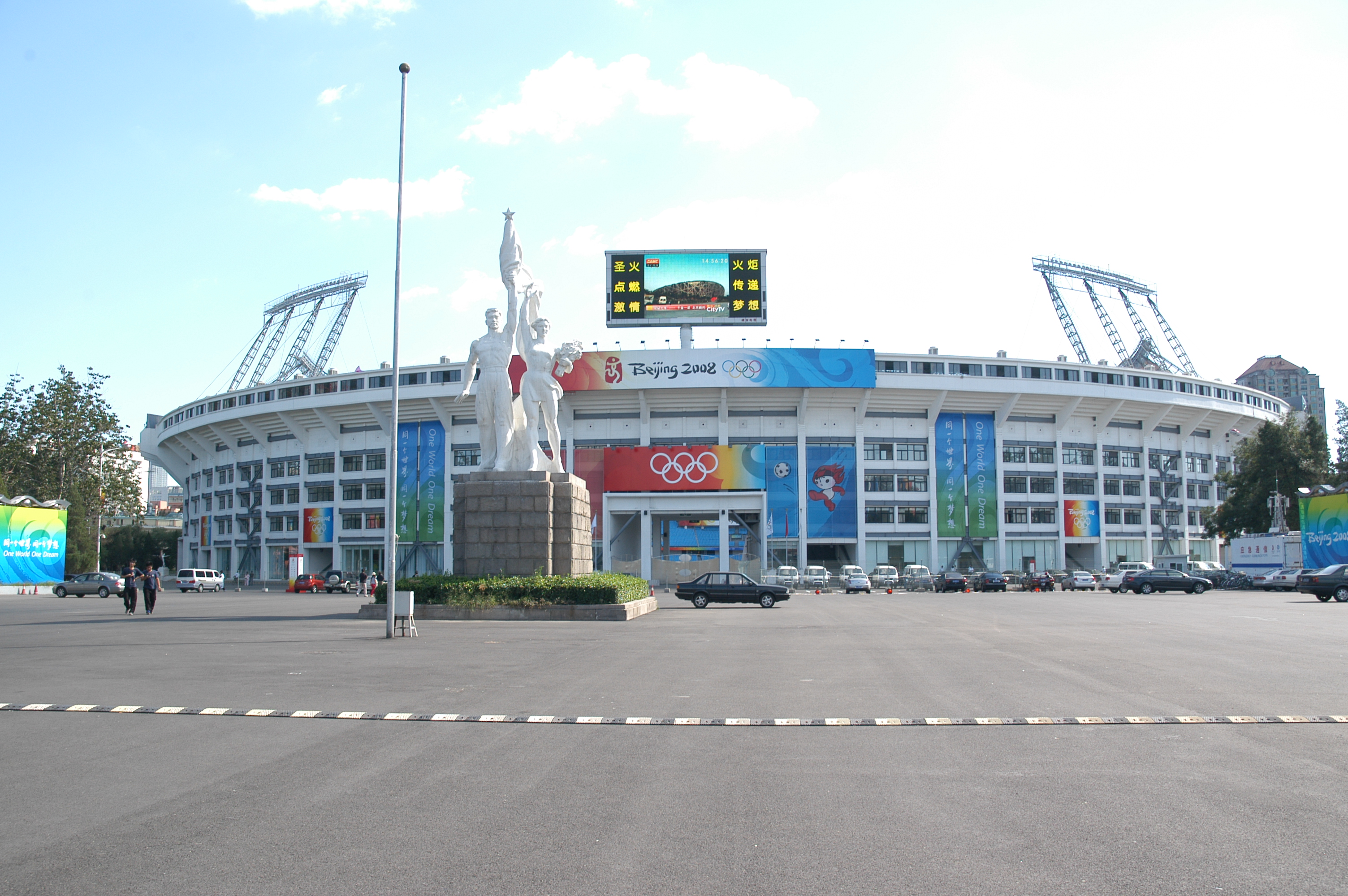
- The stadium in 2008
- Interactive map of Workers' Stadium
- Location: Chaoyang, Beijing, China
- Coordinates: 39°55′46.3″N 116°26′28.1″E
- Owner: All-China Federation of Trade Unions
- Operator: Sinobo Group
- Capacity: 65,094
- Surface: Grass

Construction
- Opened: 1959
- Renovated: 2001, 2004, 2008, 2010–2011
- Closed: August 2020
- Demolished: 2020
- Architect: Beijing Institute of Architectural Design
- Structural engineer: Beijing Construction Engineering Group

Tenants
- Beijing Guoan (1996–2005, 2009–2019); China national football team (until 2020)

Website
- gongti.com.cn

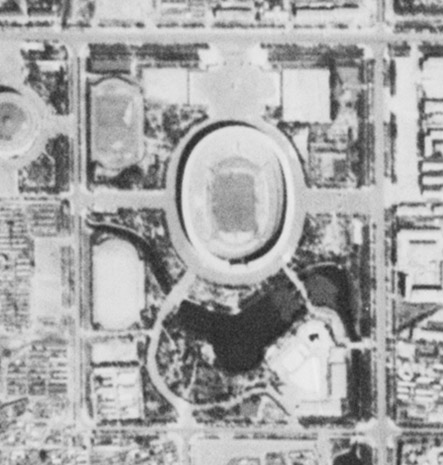
Satellite image of Workers' Stadium in September 1967

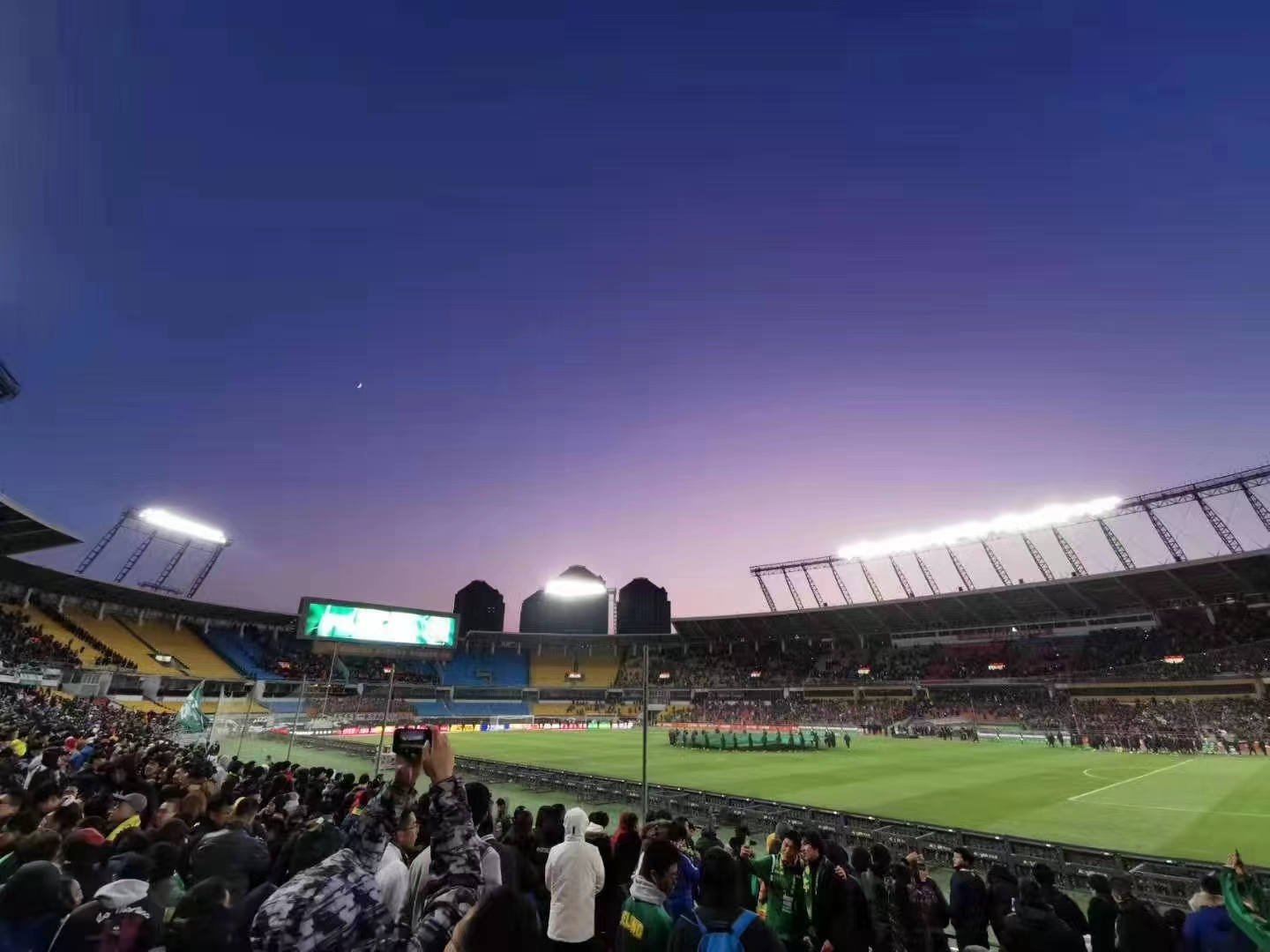
Inside the Workers' Stadium prior to the 2020–2022 renovation

Workers' Stadium
- Simplified Chinese: 工人体育场
- Traditional Chinese: 工人體育場
Transcriptions
Standard Mandarin
- Hanyu Pinyin: Gōngrén Tǐyùchǎng
- Wade–Giles: Kūngrén T'ǐyǜch'ǎng
- Yale Romanization: Gūngrén Tǐyùchǎng
- IPA: [kʊ́ŋɻə̌n tʰìŷʈʂʰàŋ]

The original Workers' Stadium (工人体育场; often abbreviated as Gongti or 工体) was a multi-purpose stadium in Chaoyang, Beijing, China. The stadium was built in 1959, and was renovated in 2004 (the concrete structure strengthened, a new rotating display screen and energy-saving devices installed). The stadium was demolished in 2020 and reopened under the same name on 15 April 2023 as a new stadium built on the original site. It had a capacity of 65,094 and covered a land area of 350,000 square metres (3,800,000 sq ft). It was one of the Ten Great Buildings constructed in 1959 for the tenth anniversary of the People's Republic of China.

== History ==
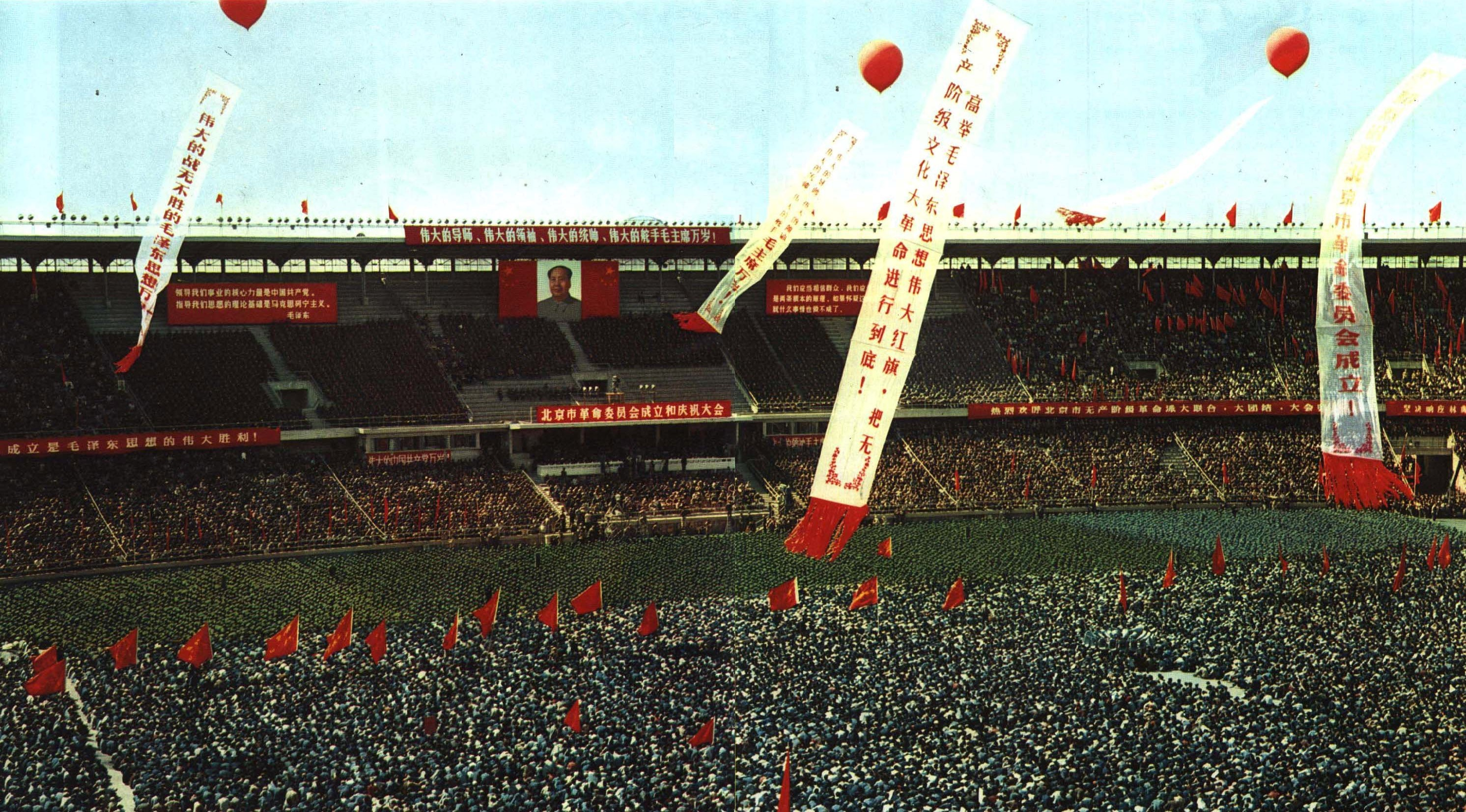
Workers' Stadium during the Cultural Revolution in 1967

The stadium was the main venue for the 1990 Asian Games, where the opening and closing ceremonies were held. Some high attendance matches of the Beijing Guo'an football club are held at the stadium. In 1993, the stadium was host to a slew of world records set by the world-leading group of Chinese distance runners at the seventh edition of the Chinese National Games, the most famous being international stars and world champions Wang Junxia and Qu Yunxia, who had dominated the 1993 World Championships a month before.

The stadium holds claim to the fastest women's 1500 m time ever recorded of 3:50.46, the fastest women's 3000 m of 8:06.11 and the fastest women's 10,000 m of 29:31.78. These world records still stand today and are arguably the stadium's biggest claim to fame. The next year, the stadium was partially demolished and renovated as part of China's bid for the 2000 Summer Olympics, which ultimately failed. The stadium continued to be the main Beijing sports into the 21st century, being the 2001 Summer Universiade and the Grand Final venue of 2004 AFC Asian Cup.

After Beijing became the host of the 2008 Summer Olympics in July 2001, which the stadium was originally intended as the Olympic Stadium, the Beijing National Stadium was built, and the venue was relegated to a secondary role, but hosted the men's football quarter-finals and semi-finals, and the women's gold medal final. The stadium was scheduled to host the first ever NFL game played in China, a preseason game between the Seattle Seahawks and the New England Patriots, on 8 August 2007, but was canceled in April 2007 by the NFL, which wanted to devote all its resources to the scheduled regular season game between the Miami Dolphins and the New York Giants in London on 28 October 2007.

The stadium was the host for the 2009 Barclays Asia Trophy between 29 and 31 July 2009, featuring Beijing Guoan, and Premier League clubs Tottenham Hotspur, West Ham United and Hull City. It also hosted FC Bayern Munich's pre-season China Tour of 2012, during which the Bundesliga club played a friendly match with Beijing Guoan. The areas north (Sanlitun), east, and west of the stadium are popular nightlife destinations. The West Gate (Chinese: 西门; pinyin: xī mén) offers a strip of nightclubs. The Workers Indoor Arena is located to the west of the stadium. The stadium has been used for concerts as well. Global superstar Mariah Carey began her sold-out five-show Chinese tour at the Workers Stadium, and Linkin Park played The Hunting Party Tour on 26 July 2015 in front of an audience of 60,000.

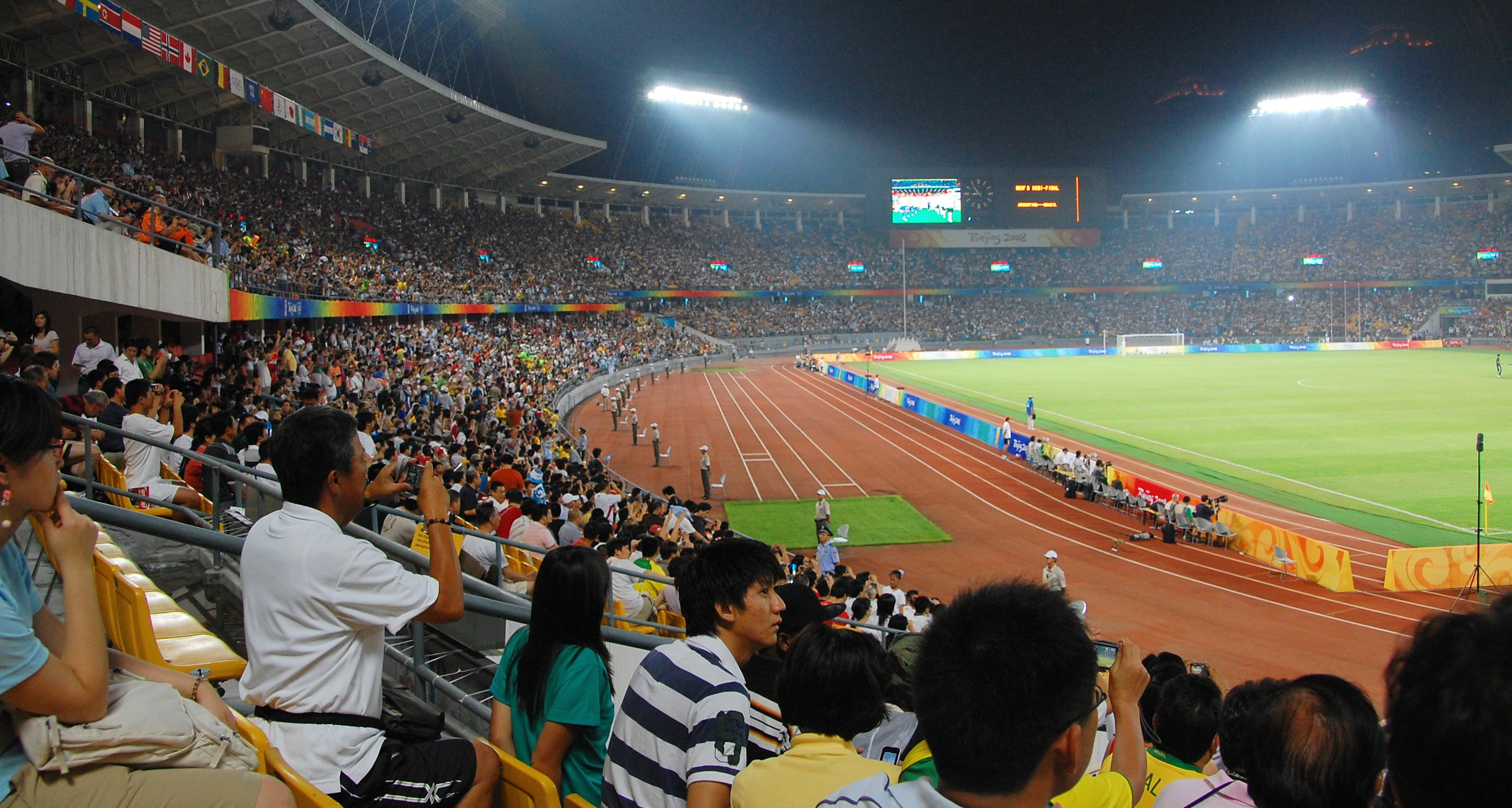
Interior during the 2008 Summer Olympics

== Demolition ==
On 4 January 2020, Workers' Stadium was announced as a host venue for the 2023 AFC Asian Cup. However, on 14 May 2022, AFC announced that China would not be able to host the tournament due to the exceptional circumstances caused by the COVID-19 pandemic.

After finishing the 2019 season, Beijing Guoan moved its home stadium the Beijing Fengtai Stadium for three years while renovations ahead of the tournament took place. The engineering firm of the rebuild project is Beijing Construction Engineering Group.

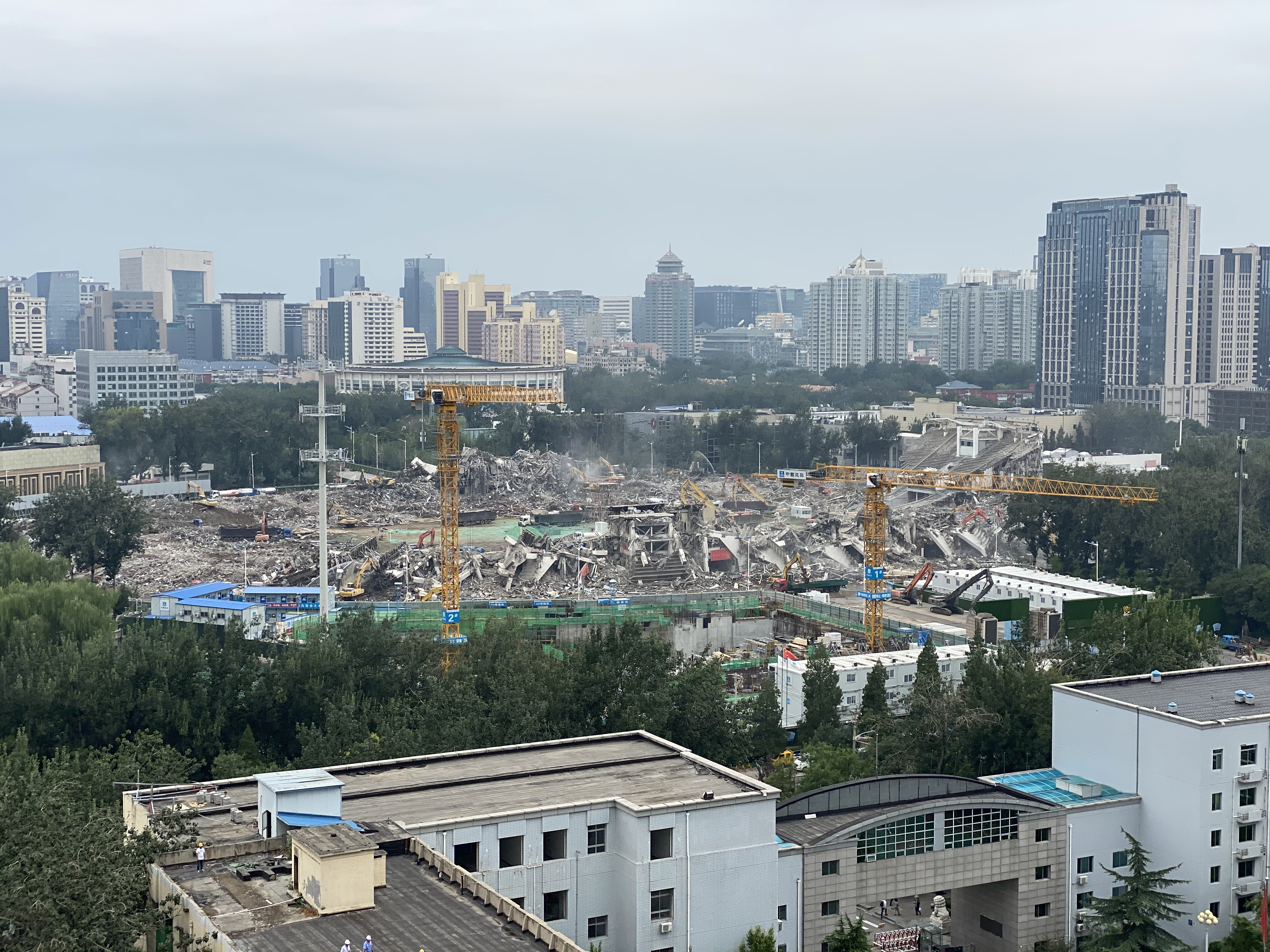
Demolished Workers' Stadium, August 2020

== Notable concerts ==
- 6 August 1999: A-mei - Mei Li 99
- 13 October 2002: Glay - Glay One Love In Beijing, audience: 35,000
- 28 August 2004: Faye Wong - No Faye! No Live! Tour
- 23 September 2005: S.H.E - Fantasy Land World Tour
- 22 October 2005: Rain - Rainy Day 2005 Tour
- 1 May 2008: Jay Chou - Jay Chou 2007 World Tour
- 16 September 2011: SMAP - We are SMAP! 2011 live in Beijing
- 17 May 2014: Dave Wang Dave Wang comeback World Tour
- 10 October 2014: Mariah Carey - The Elusive Chanteuse Show, audience: 60,000
- 19 October 2014: YG Entertainment - Power World Tour
- 26 July 2015: Linkin Park - The Hunting Party Tour
- 14 July 2018: Joker Xue - Skyscraper World Tour

Events and tenants
Preceded by Son Moix; Palma de Mallorca	Summer Universiade; Main venue 2001	Succeeded by Daegu World Cup Stadium; Daegu
Preceded by Camille Chamoun Sports City Stadium; Beirut	AFC Asian Cup; Final venue 2004	Succeeded by Gelora Bung Karno Stadium; Jakarta
Preceded by Karaiskakis Stadium; Piraeus	Summer Olympics; Women's football gold medal match venue 2008	Succeeded by Wembley Stadium; London
