= Karel Stromšík =

Czechoslovak footballer (born 1958)

Personal information
- Full name: Karel Stromšík
- Date of birth: 12 April 1958 (age 68)
- Place of birth: Nový Jičín, Czechoslovakia
- Position: Goalkeeper

Team information
- Current team: Sereď (manager)

Youth career
- 1973–1975: TJ Nový Jičín

Senior career*
Years	Team	Apps	(Gls)
1975–1977	ŽD Bohumín		
1977–1978	VTJ Tachov		
1978–1986	Dukla Prague	136	(0)
1986–1989	ŠK Slovan Bratislava	82	(0)
1989–1991	Selangor	18	(0)
1993–1994	SK České Budějovice	8	(0)
1994–1995	Tatran Poštorná	10	(0)

International career
1980–1982	Czechoslovakia	4	(0)

Managerial career
- 1996–2001: Artmedia Petržalka (assistant)
- 2002–2003: Mahindra United
- 2003–2004: Public Bank
- 2005–2006: Kuban Krasnodar (assistant)
- 2007–2008: Viktoria Žižkov
- 2016: PKNS (goalkeeping coach)
- 2018–2019: Sereď
- 2021–: Selangor
- * Club domestic league appearances and goals

Karel Stromšík (born 12 April 1958) is a former football goalkeeper from Czechoslovakia. He was a member of the national team that competed at the 1982 FIFA World Cup, playing two group games after replacing the injured Stanislav Seman in the second group match against England. Stromšík obtained a total number of four caps for his native country, between 24 September 1980 and 24 June 1982.

== Playing career ==
Stromšík played in his country for several clubs, gaining the biggest success at Dukla Prague. He won the Czechoslovak First League with Dukla in 1979 and 1982.

== Managerial career ==
After finishing his active career, he began with football coaching. He coached in the Czech Republic, Slovakia, Malaysia, Kuwait, India and other countries.

In Malaysia, Stromsik played for Selangor FA in the highest league of the country. He was regarded as the best goalkeeper the team ever had, after the late R Arumugam (Malaysian). Stromsik was often poached by other teams during his stint in Malaysia, but he remained a Red Giant throughout his Malaysian tour.

Stromšík moved to India and became manager of FC Kochin in 2001. From 2002 to 2003, he managed another Indian side Mahindra United FC in the National Football League.
