= Zdeněk Hruška =

Czech footballer (born 1954)

Personal information
- Date of birth: 25 July 1954 (age 72)
- Place of birth: Prague, Czechoslovakia
- Position: Goalkeeper

Youth career
- 1962–1974: Slavoj Vyšehrad

Senior career*
Years	Team	Apps	(Gls)
1974–1976	Dukla Tachov		
1976–1985	Bohemians Prague		
1985–1987	Slavia Prague	30	(0)
1987–1988	Veria FC	12	(0)
1988–1989	Bohemians Prague	35	(0)
1989–1990	SC Wacker Vienna		
1990–1992	Floridsdorfer AC		

International career
1977–1983	Czechoslovakia	24	(0)

Managerial career
- 1992: Floridsdorfer AC (player-manager)
- 1992–1995: Bohemians Prague (assistant)
- 1995: Bohemians Prague
- 1996: FC Turnov
- 1996–1997: VT Chomutov
- 1997–1998: Slovan Liberec (co-manager)
- 1999–2001: Tennis Borussia Berlin (co-manager)
- 2001–2003: FSC Libuš
- 2003: Bohemians Prague
- 2004–: FSC Libuš
- * Club domestic league appearances and goals

Zdeněk Hruška (born 25 July 1954) is a Czech football manager and former player. As a goalkeeper who spent the longest part of his career with Bohemians Prague Hruška had 24 appearances for Czechoslovakia and participated at the 1982 FIFA World Cup.

== Club career ==
Hruška was born in Prague. He started his career at Slavoj Vyšehrad which he left in 1974 in order to undergo a two years of military service. From 1976 he played in the goal for Bohemians Prague where he in 1982 won the Czechoslovakia cup and in 1983 became champion of Czechoslovakia. His biggest achievement in European cups came in 1983 when Bohemians reached the UEFA Cup semifinals. After nine years with Bohemians he left in 1985 for Slavia Prague where he spent two years. In the season of 1987/1988 he played for Veria in the Super League Greece. After that he returned to Bohemians but after a single season in Prague he left again and went to Wacker/Groß Viktoria in the Austrian Regional league. In 1990 Hruška transferred to FAC Viktoria Wien where he retired from playing.

In the top league of Czechoslovakia Hruška played a total of 247 games.

== International career ==
Hruška had his debut in the Czechoslovakia national team on 9 December 1977 in a friendly against Hungary. He missed the 1980 European Cup due to an injury. He didn't do very well in the first game for Czechoslovakia at the 1982 FIFA World cup where Czechoslovakia made a disappointing draw with Kuwait. Stanislav Seman replaced him in goal in the following match against England. Hruška played his last game (from a total of 24) as Czechoslovakia played a 1:1 draw against Romania on 30 November 1983.

== Managerial career ==
From 1992 Hruška was an assistant manager at Bohemians Prague, in 1995 he was appointed as general manager. His next stations included FC Turnov in the fourth league and VT Chomutov in the third league. In the 1997/98 season he was a co-manager for Slovan Liberec, from 1999 until 2001 he worked as a goalkeeper trainer for Tennis Borussia Berlin in Germany. Later he took up the Prague team FSC Libuš, returned to Bohemians Prague and after being fired just a few months later, returned to managing FSC Libuš again.
