= Křenovice (Přerov District) =

- Municipality
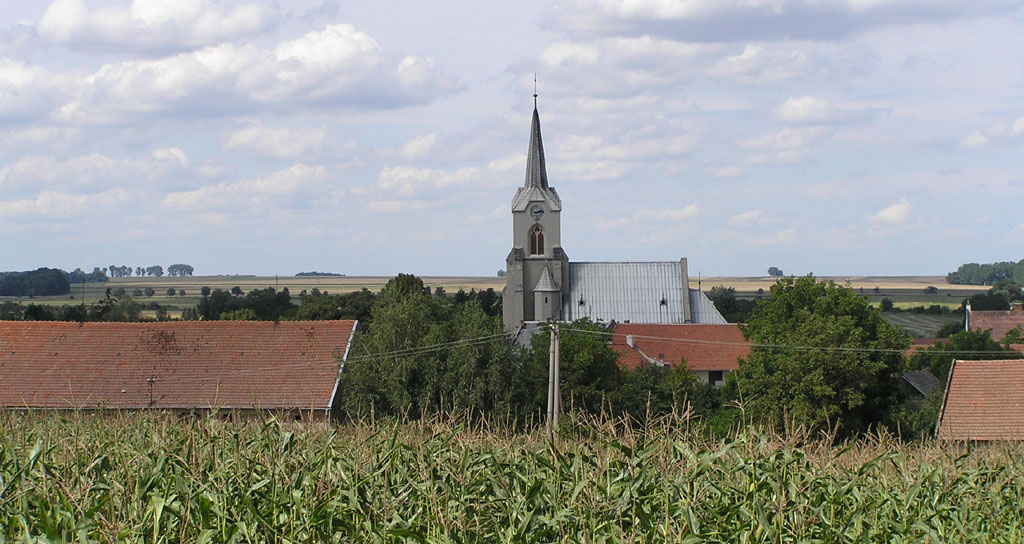
- General view

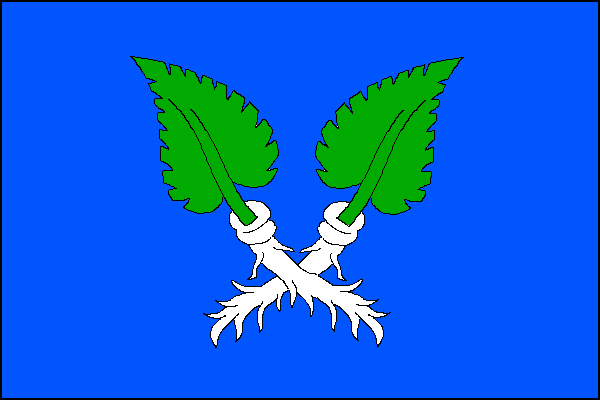
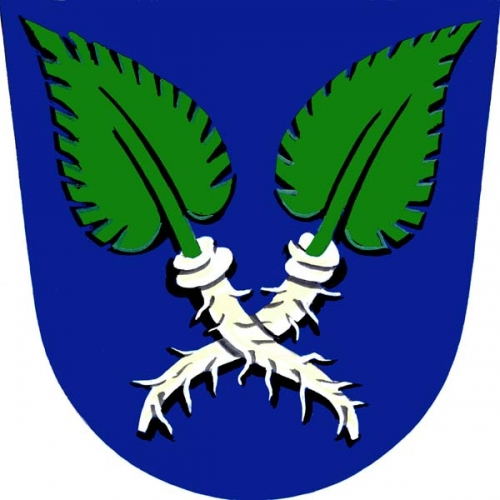
- Flag Coat of arms

- Location in the Czech Republic
- Coordinates: 49°19′50″N 17°16′22″E
- Country: Czech Republic
- Region: Olomouc
- District: Přerov
- First mentioned: 1322

Area
  - Total: 9.05 km^{2} (3.49 sq mi)
- Elevation: 202 m (663 ft)

Population (2026-01-01)
  - Total: 458
  - Density: 50.6/km^{2} (131/sq mi)
- Time zone: UTC+1 (CET)
  - Summer (DST): UTC+2 (CEST)
- Postal code: 752 01
- Website: www.krenovice.net

Křenovice is a municipality and village in Přerov District in the Olomouc Region of the Czech Republic. It has about 500 inhabitants.

Křenovice lies approximately 20 kilometres (12 mi) south-west of Přerov, 31 km (19 mi) south of Olomouc, and 223 km (139 mi) east of Prague.

== Demographics ==
Historical population
Year	Pop.	±%
1869	563	—
1880	601	+6.7%
1890	645	+7.3%
1900	658	+2.0%
1910	731	+11.1%
1921	760	+4.0%
1930	746	−1.8%
1950	631	−15.4%
1961	673	+6.7%
1970	594	−11.7%
1980	529	−10.9%
1991	462	−12.7%
2001	439	−5.0%
2011	426	−3.0%
2021	421	−1.2%
Source: Censuses

== Notable people ==
- Rostislav Vojáček (born 1949), footballer
