= Jozef Kukučka =

Slovak footballer

Personal information
- Date of birth: 13 March 1957 (age 69)
- Place of birth: Považská Bystrica, Czechoslovakia
- Position: Defender

Senior career*
Years	Team	Apps	(Gls)
1979–1983	Plastika Nitra	112	(6)
1983–1984	Rudá Hvězda Cheb	22	(0)
1984–1986	Bohemians Praha	33	(2)
1986–1990	ZVL Považská Bystrica		

International career
1981–1985	Czechoslovakia	7	(0)
- * Club domestic league appearances and goals

Jozef Kukučka (born 13 March 1957) is a Slovak retired footballer.

During his club career he played for TJ Plastika Nitra, TJ Rudá Hvězda Cheb, FC Bohemians Praha and ZVL Považská Bystrica. He earned 7 caps for the Czechoslovakia national football team from 1981 to 1985, and participated in the 1982 FIFA World Cup.
