= Rostislav Vojáček =

Czech footballer (born 1949)

Personal information
- Date of birth: 23 February 1949 (age 77)
- Place of birth: Křenovice, Czechoslovakia
- Position: Defender

Youth career
- Křenovice
- Slavoj Kojetín

Senior career*
Years	Team	Apps	(Gls)
1968–1969	Dukla Kroměříž		
1969–1970	Dukla Tábor		
1970–1986	Baník Ostrava	381	(26)

International career
1974–1982	Czechoslovakia	40	(1)
- * Club domestic league appearances and goals

Rostislav Vojáček (born 23 February 1949 in Křenovice) is a Czech former football defender. He played for Czechoslovakia, for which he played 40 matches and scored one goal.

He was participant in the 1982 FIFA World Cup and had a sticker in that album and a member of the bronze team in the 1980 UEFA European Championship.

In his country he played for Baník Ostrava, for which he played 381 league matches and scored 26 league goals. Vojáček contributed to the best period in the history of the club. During his years as a player of the club, Baník won the Czechoslovak First League in 1976, 1980 and 1981. Baník also won the Czechoslovak Cup in 1973 and 1978.

In 2000, he briefly coached Baník Ostrava.
