= 2004 AFC Asian Cup final =

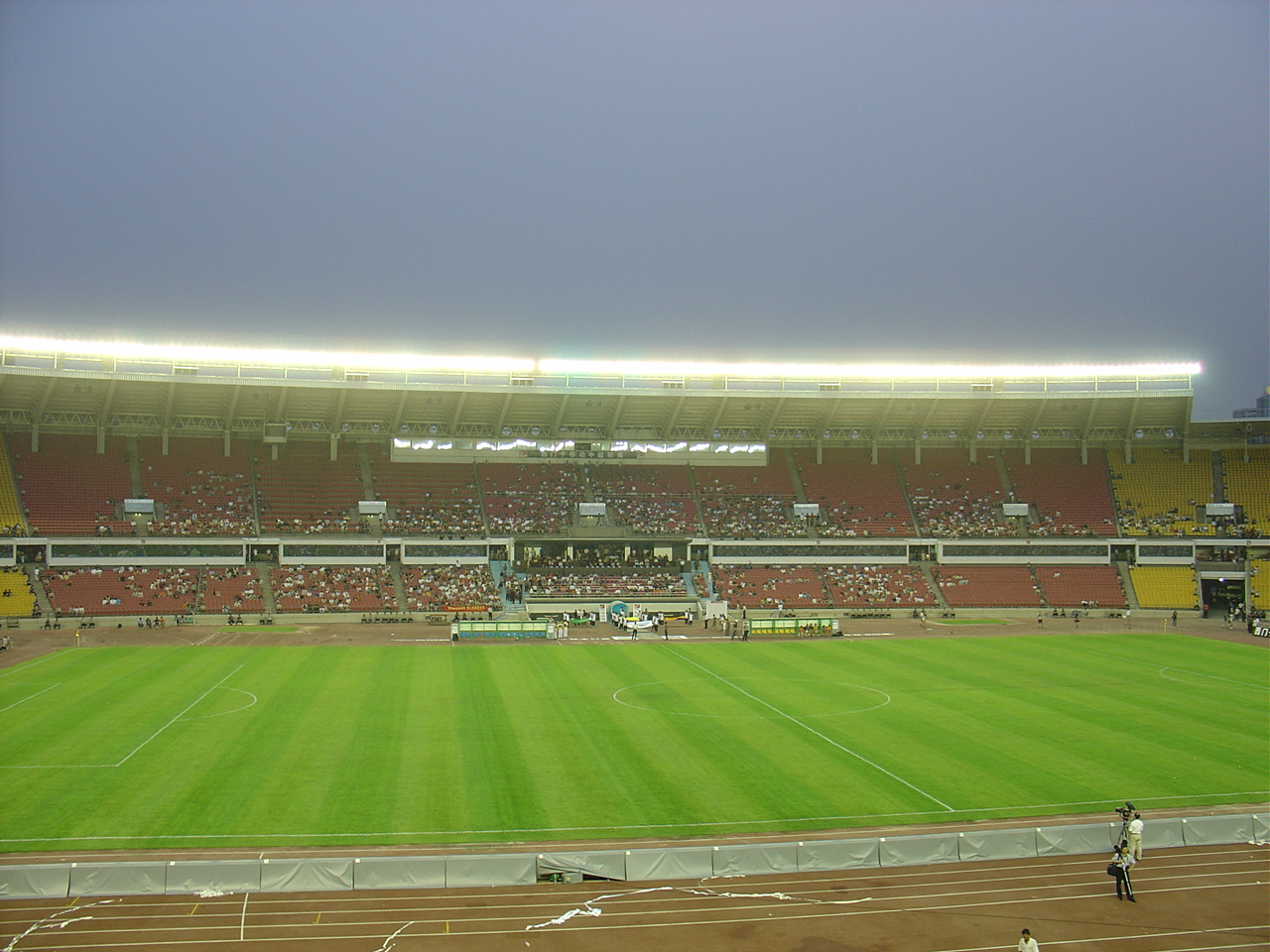
- The Workers' Stadium hosted the final
- Event: 2004 AFC Asian Cup
China PR	Japan
(China)	(Japan)
1	3
- Date: 7 August 2004
- Venue: Workers' Stadium, Beijing
- Man of the Match: Shunsuke Nakamura (Japan)
- Referee: Saad Kamil Al-Fadhli (Kuwait)
- Attendance: 62,000
- Weather: Overcast; 19°C <31% humidity

The 2004 AFC Asian Cup final was a football match that took place on 7 August 2004 at the Workers' Stadium in Beijing, the People's Republic of China, to determine the winners of the 2004 AFC Asian Cup.

== Background ==
The 2004 AFC Asian Cup was the 13th AFC Asian Cup, a football competition organised by the AFC for senior men's national teams of member associations. Qualifying began from 21 March to 3 December 2003, divided into two rounds: preliminary and qualifying, with seven groups in each stage. The top two teams of each seven groups in the final qualifying round would progress to the tournament.

China and Japan automatically qualified for the tournament, with China being the hosts and Japan being the defending champions, having beaten Saudi Arabia in the previous final. Also in the previous edition in Lebanon, China and Japan faced each other in the semi-finals, with Japan winning 3–2. Leading up to this match, China had won against Japan 15 times while Japan had only beaten China in 10 matches; yet China hadn't won the AFC Asian Cup, only finishing second in 1984, while Japan claimed their first Asian Cup title at home in 1992 before winning it again in 2000.

== Route to the final ==
China PR
Round
Japan
Opponent
Result
Group stage
Opponent
Result
Bahrain
2–2
Match 1
Oman
1–0
Indonesia
5–0
Match 2
Thailand
4–1
Qatar
1–0
Match 3
Iran
0–0

Team	Pts	Pld	W	D	L	GF	GA	GD
China	7	3	2	1	0	8	2	+6
Bahrain	5	3	1	2	0	6	4	+2
Indonesia	3	3	1	0	2	3	9	−6
Qatar	1	3	0	1	2	2	4	−2

Final standing

Team	Pts	Pld	W	D	L	GF	GA	GD
Japan	7	3	2	1	0	5	1	+4
Iran	5	3	1	2	0	5	2	+3
Oman	4	3	1	1	1	4	3	+1
Thailand	0	3	0	0	3	1	9	−8

Opponent
Result
Knockout stage
Opponent
Result
Iraq
3–0
Quarterfinals
Jordan
1–1 (4–3 pen.)
Iran
1–1 (4–3 pen.)
Semifinals
Bahrain
4–3 (a.e.t.)

=== China ===
As hosts, China were automatically assigned in Group A, facing Indonesia, Bahrain and Qatar in process. All three China's group stage games were held in Beijing. China went to suffer a shock 2–2 draw over minnows Bahrain in the opening fixture, with Husain Ali burying China's hope for a maiden win with a last-minute goal. China then routed Indonesia 5–0, with Shao Jiayi scoring twice in China's emphatic win, added with Indonesia only playing with ten men due to a red card by Alexander Pulalo after Shao's opening goal. However, China struggled against a highly defensive Qatar in the final game, only winning 1–0 courtesy of a 77th-minute goal from Xu Yunlong to top the group and reaching the quarter-finals.

China's first opponent in the knockout stage was Iraq, who finished second in Group B. Hao Haidong scored an early lead before Zheng Zhi netted two penalties to give China a triumphant 3–0 win over the Iraqis. In the semi-finals, China faced Iran, a far stronger side. The Chinese scored first in the 18th minute thanks to Shao Jiayi, only to be equalised 20 minutes later by Mohammad Alavi. Iran was later reduced to ten men when Sattar Zare was sent off for shoving Shao Jiayi, before another red card was given in the second half on Alavi, who was already substituted early in the second half. Yet China failed to capitalise the opportunity and had to settle on a penalty shootout, which they won 4–3, with Yahya Golmohammadi missing Iran's crucial kick.

=== Japan ===
As the defending champions, Japan were drawn in Group D with debutants Oman, alongside fellow powerhouse Iran and Thailand. All of Japan's group stage matches were played in Chongqing, which became a hotspot for anti-Japanese hostilities. Japan began their campaign with a hard-fought 1–0 win over Oman, with Shunsuke Nakamura scoring the match's only goal. Japan then overcame a shock goal to defeat Thailand 4–1, effectively knocking the War Elephants out of the tournament. Japan then confirmed their top place in the group with a goalless draw over Iran.

In the quarter-finals, Japan faced Jordan, another dark horse of the tournament. To make things difficult, Mahmoud Shelbaieh opened the score for Jordan in the 11th minute, before Takayuki Suzuki equalised just three minutes later. Japan failed to make subsequent chances in the second half and extra time and had to settle for penalties, after Shunsuke Nakamura and Alex missed two of Japan's three first penalties while the Jordanians succeeded in converting both, yet they went on to miss four straight kicks due to controversial decisions, allowing Japan time to restore parity before winning 4–3. Japan's semi-final match in Jinan was a showdown against Bahrain, another Arab opponent. Despite Yasuhito Endo's red card in the 40th minute, the Samurai Blue came out victorious, winning 4–3 after extra time.

== Match ==
=== Details ===
7 August 2004
20:00

China	1–3	Japan
Li Ming 31'	Report	Fukunishi 22'; Nakata 65'; Tamada 90+1'

Workers' Stadium, Beijing
Attendance: 62,000
Referee: Saad Kamil Al-Fadhli (Kuwait)

China PR	Japan

GK	1	Liu Yunfei
CB	12	Wei Xin	(yellow card) 83'
CB	4	Zhang Yaokun
CB	3	Sun Xiang	(yellow card) 24'
RM	6	Shao Jiayi
CM	5	Zheng Zhi
CM	15	Zhao Junzhe (c)
LM	21	Li Ming
AM	22	Yan Song		(substituted off) 68'
CF	9	Hao Haidong		(substituted off) 57'
CF	29	Li Jinyu		(substituted off) 75'
Substitutions:
FW	11	Li Yi		(substituted in) 57'
DF	7	Sun Jihai	(yellow card) 90+3'	(substituted in) 68'
DF	13	Xu Yunlong		(substituted in) 75'
Manager:
(Netherlands) Arie Haan

GK	23	Yoshikatsu Kawaguchi
CB	3	Makoto Tanaka
CB	5	Tsuneyasu Miyamoto (c)
CB	22	Yuji Nakazawa
RM	21	Akira Kaji
CM	15	Takashi Fukunishi
CM	6	Koji Nakata	(yellow card) 41'
LM	14	Alex
AM	10	Shunsuke Nakamura
CF	11	Takayuki Suzuki	(yellow card) 13'
CF	20	Keiji Tamada
Manager:
(Brazil) Zico

Man of the Match:
Shunsuke Nakamura (Japan)

Assistant referees:
Fathi Arabati (Jordan)
Ali Al-Khalifi (Qatar)

AFC Asian Cup 2004 winners

Japan
Third title

== Aftermath ==
Political tensions related to World War II, which later transcended into the field, would be further escalated by the defeat of the Chinese hosts to Japan. The goal by Koji Nakata, later determined to be a clear handball, was controversially counted by the Kuwaiti referee despite complaints from the Chinese players. In response, Chinese fans started rioting outside the stadium and attacked the buses escorting Japanese team and fans. This in turn affected China's perpetration for the 2008 Summer Olympics in Beijing.

For the Chinese team as well, this loss meant they had failed to lift the trophy twice, with its first hurdle happened in the 1984 when it lost to Saudi Arabia. The Chinese have not returned to the semifinal (let alone a final) of an Asian Cup since 2004.

For Japan, this was the first time they had defended the trophy. Japan would go on to lift the trophy again in 2011, before losing in the 2019 final.

== See also ==
- China–Japan football rivalry
