= 1992 AFC Asian Cup final =

Association football match

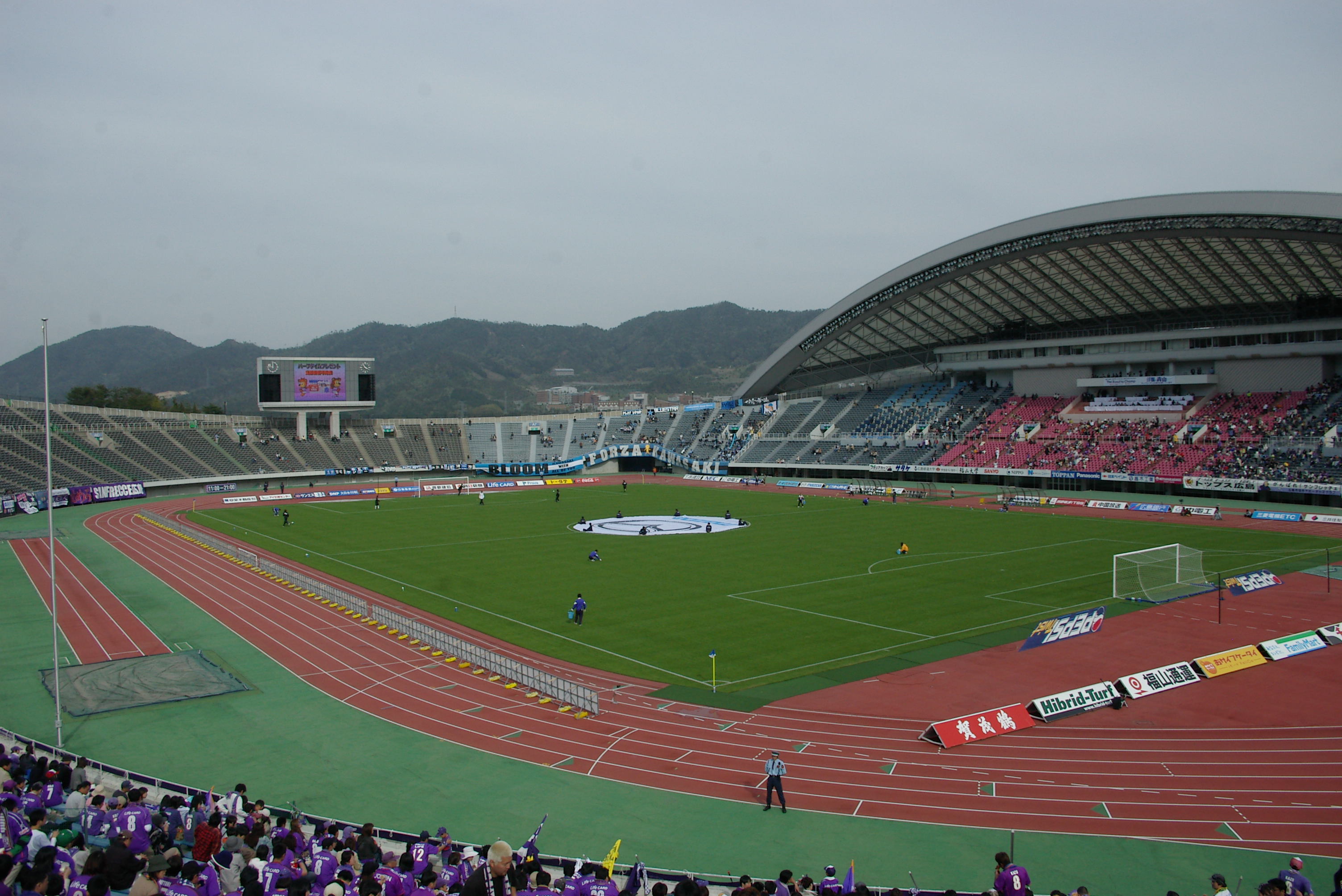
- Hiroshima Big Arch (pictured in 2005) held the final
- Event: 1992 AFC Asian Cup
Japan	Saudi Arabia
(Japan)	(Saudi Arabia)
1	0
- Date: 8 November 1992
- Venue: Hiroshima Big Arch, Hiroshima
- Referee: Jamal Al Sharif (Syria)
- Attendance: 60,000

The 1992 AFC Asian Cup final was a football match which determined the winner of the 1992 AFC Asian Cup, the 10th edition of the AFC Asian Cup, a quadrennial tournament contested by the men's national teams of the member associations of the Asian Football Confederation.

== Venue ==
Hiroshima Big Arch also known as Edion Stadium Hiroshima, located in Hiroshima, Japan, hosted the 1992 AFC Asian Cup Final. The 36,894-seat stadium was built in 1992. It was the main stadium used to host the 1992 Asian Cup; eight matches were played in this stadium including the final.

== Route to the final ==
Japan
Round
Saudi Arabia
Opponents
Result
Group stage
Opponents
Result
United Arab Emirates
0–0
Match 1
China
1–1
North Korea
1–1
Match 2
Qatar
1–1
Iran
1–0
Match 3
Thailand
4–0
Group A Winners

Pos	Team	Pld	Pts
1	Japan (H)	3	4
2	United Arab Emirates	3	4
3	Iran	3	3
4	North Korea	3	1

Source: WorldFootball.net
(H) Hosts
Final standings
Group B winners

Pos	Team	Pld	Pts
1	Saudi Arabia	3	4
2	China	3	4
3	Qatar	3	2
4	Thailand	3	2

Source: WorldFootball.net
Opponents
Result
Knockout stage
Opponents
Result
China
3–2
Semi-finals
United Arab Emirates
2–0

== Match ==
=== Final ===
8 November 1992
14:30

Japan	1–0	Saudi Arabia
Takagi 36'	Report

Hiroshima Big Arch, Hiroshima
Attendance: 60,000
Referee: Jamal Al Sharif (Syria)

GK	19	Kazuya Maekawa
RB	4	Takumi Horiike	(yellow card) 45'
CB	5	Tetsuji Hashiratani (c)
CB	7	Masami Ihara
LB	6	Satoshi Tsunami
DM	15	Mitsunori Yoshida		(substituted off) 86'
RM	14	Tsuyoshi Kitazawa
LM	10	Ruy Ramos	(yellow card) 69'
AM	8	Masahiro Fukuda
CF	20	Takuya Takagi
CF	11	Kazuyoshi Miura	(yellow card) 75'
Substitutions:
DF	3	Toshinobu Katsuya		(substituted on) 86'
Manager:
(Netherlands) Hans Ooft

GK	21	Shaker Al-Shujaa
CB	2	Abdullah Al-Dosari	(yellow card) 88'
CB	4	Abdul Rahman Al-Roomi
CB	5	Mohammed Al-Khilaiwi
RM	3	Salem Al-Alawi
CM	6	Fuad Anwar Amin (c)
CM	8	Fahad Al-Bishi	(yellow card) 70'
LM	14	Khaled Al-Muwallid
RF	7	Saeed Al-Owairan
CF	9	Hamzah Idris		(substituted off) 66'
LF	15	Yousuf Al-Thunayan
Substitutions:
FW	11	Fahad Al-Mehallel		(substituted on) 66'
Manager:
(Brazil) Nelsinho Rosa

Assistant referees:
Noh Byung-Il (South Korea)
Choi Hae-Il (North Korea)
