= Tomáš Kříž =

Czech footballer

Personal information
- Date of birth: 17 March 1959 (age 67)
- Place of birth: Prague, Czechoslovakia
- Height: 1.78 m (5 ft 10 in)
- Position: Striker

Youth career
- 1966–1977: Dukla Prague

Senior career*
Years	Team	Apps	(Gls)
1977–1989	Dukla Prague	237	(31)
1989–1991	SV Darmstadt 98	15	(1)
1991	Chmel Blšany		

International career
1981–1986	Czechoslovakia	10	(0)
- * Club domestic league appearances and goals

Tomáš Kříž (born 17 March 1959) is a retired Czech footballer.

During his club career he played for Dukla Prague. He won the Czechoslovak First League with them three times, in 1977, 1979 and 1982.

He earned ten caps for the Czechoslovakia national football team from 1981 to 1986, and participated in the 1982 FIFA World Cup.
