= Adam Marjan =

Kuwaiti footballer

Personal information
- Full name: Adam Ahmed Marjan
- Date of birth: 23 September 1957 (age 69)
- Place of birth: Kuwait
- Position: Goalkeeper

Senior career*
| Years | Team | Apps | (Gls) |
| 1975–1987 | Kazma | | |

International career
| 1980–1985 | Kuwait | | |

Managerial career
- 1999: Kazma SC
- * Club domestic league appearances and goals

Adam Ahmed Marjan (Arabic: آدَم أَحْمَد مَرْجَان; born 23 September 1957) is a Kuwaiti football goalkeeper who played for Kuwait in the 1982 FIFA World Cup. He also played for Kazma Sporting Club.
