= Didier Six =

French football manager (born 1954)

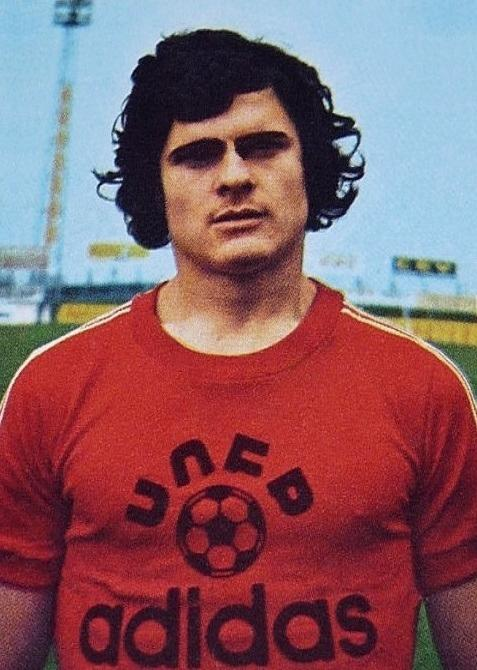
- Six in 1974

Personal information
- Date of birth: 21 August 1954 (age 72)
- Place of birth: Lille, Nord, France
- Height: 1.77 m (5 ft 10 in)
- Position: Left winger

Senior career*
Years	Team	Apps	(Gls)
1972–1977	Valenciennes	154	(53)
1977–1978	Lens	29	(13)
1978–1980	Marseille	66	(14)
1980	Cercle Brugge	12	(7)
1981	Strasbourg	19	(1)
1981–1983	VfB Stuttgart	59	(23)
1983–1984	Mulhouse	31	(12)
1984–1985	Aston Villa	15	(2)
1985–1986	Metz	32	(3)
1986	Strasbourg	14	(2)
1987	Valenciennes	10	(4)
1987–1988	Galatasaray	22	(2)
1988–1989	Stade Vallauris	9	(1)
1989–1990	ASPV Strasbourg	19	(3)
1990–1992	VfB Leipzig	12	(1)
Total		503	(141)

International career
1976–1984	France	52	(13)

Managerial career
- 1992–1993: Strasbourg B
- 1997–1998: Strasbourg Koenigshoffen
- 2004: Audun-le-Tiche
- 2011–2014: Togo
- 2015: Mauritius
- 2019–2021: Guinea
Medal record
Representing France
UEFA European Championship
Winner	1984
- * Club domestic league appearances and goals

Didier Six (born 21 August 1954) is a French football manager and former player, who most recently worked as manager of the Guinea national football team until October 2021.

A gifted but inconsistent winger, Six had a rather nomadic career, playing in five countries. He also played for France in the 1978 and 1982 FIFA World Cups, and was also part of the winning team at Euro 84.

== Playing career ==
Six began his playing career at Division 2 side Valenciennes, making his debut at the age of 17 in 1972. He helped Les Athéniens achieve promotion to the top flight in 1975, which was followed by a remarkable season where they finished tenth, and Six finished as the top scorer at the club with 12 goals.

After turning down offers from Ajax, Borussia Dortmund and Feyenoord, Six decided to join Lens in 1977, where he spent a single season, notably scoring a hattrick against Lazio in the UEFA Cup. Lens were relegated at the end of 1977-78 and Six was made the scapegoat. This was followed by two more disappointing years playing for Marseille, after which his career would become nomadic in the years that followed, playing in Belgium, Germany, England and Turkey.

On 6 October 1984, the 30-year-old made his Aston Villa debut under Graham Turner in a 3-0 home win over previously unbeaten Manchester United.

He acquired Turkish citizenship in order to play as a domestic player at Galatasaray, playing under the name Dündar Siz. There he won the Turkish First League championship in 1987–88 season.

He ended his career in 1992 after a two-year spell in the newly re-unified 2.Bundesliga with VfB Leipzig.

== International career ==
Six was first selected for the France national football team by manager Michel Hidalgo whilst still at Valenciennes, making his debut on 27 March 1976 against Czechoslovakia, the same game in which Michel Platini made his debut.

He played as a winger and he earned 52 caps and scored 13 goals for the France national football team. He played in the 1978 FIFA World Cup and the 1982 FIFA World Cup, and was also part of the winning team at Euro 84.

== Coaching career ==
Six was signed by the Togolese Football Federation as coach for the Togo national football team in November 2011.

He became manager of Mauritius in January 2015 and was fired in May 2015 following a suspension for poor behaviour during the 2015 COSAFA Cup.

In April 2018, he was one of 77 applicants for the vacant Cameroon national team job.

He became manager of Guinea on 13 September 2019, but left this role in October 2021.

== Career statistics ==
=== International ===
Appearances and goals by national team and year
National team	Year	Apps	Goals
France	1976	6	0
France	1977	5	2
France	1978	10	3
France	1979	1	1
France	1980	4	1
France	1981	8	3
France	1982	10	2
France	1983	2	1
France	1984	6	0
Total		52	13

Scores and results list France's goal tally first, score column indicates score after each Six goal.

List of international goals scored by Didier Six
No.	Date	Venue	Opponent	Score	Result	Competition
1	23 April 1977	Charmilles Stadium, Geneva, Switzerland	Switzerland	2–0	4–0	Friendly
2	30 June 1977	Maracanã Stadium, Rio de Janeiro, Brazil	Brazil	1–2	2–2	Friendly
3	11 May 1978	Stadium Municipal, Toulouse, France	Iran	2–1	2–1	Friendly
4	1 September 1978	Parc des Princes, Paris, France	Sweden	2–1	2–2	UEFA Euro 1980 qualification
5	7 October 1978	Stade Municipal, Luxembourg City, Luxembourg	Luxembourg	1–0	3–1	UEFA Euro 1980 qualification
6	7 May 1979	Giants Stadium, East Rutherford, United States	United States	6–0	6–0	Friendly
7	11 October 1980	Tsirio Stadium, Limassol, Cyprus	Cyprus	6–0	7–0	1982 FIFA World Cup qualification
8	29 April 1981	Parc des Princes, Paris, France	Belgium	3–1	3–2	1982 FIFA World Cup qualification
9	15 May 1981	Parc des Princes, Paris, France	Brazil	1–3	1–3	Friendly
10	18 November 1981	Parc des Princes, Paris, France	Netherlands	2–0	2–0	1982 FIFA World Cup qualification
11	21 June 1982	José Zorrilla Stadium, Valladolid, Spain	Kuwait	3–0	4–1	1982 FIFA World Cup
12	24 June 1982	José Zorrilla Stadium, Valladolid, Spain	Czechoslovakia	1–0	1–1	1982 FIFA World Cup
13	31 May 1983	Stade Municipal, Luxembourg City, Luxembourg	Belgium	1–0	1–1	Friendly
