= Hamoud Al-Shemmari =

Kuwaiti footballer

Personal information
- Full name: Hamoud Fleitah Al-Shemmari
- Date of birth: 26 September 1960 (age 66)
- Place of birth: Kuwait
- Height: 1.78 m (5 ft 10 in)
- Position: Defender

Senior career*
Years	Team	Apps	(Gls)
1977–1989	Kazma SC		

International career
1979–1989	Kuwait	68	
- * Club domestic league appearances and goals

Hamoud Fleitah Al-Shemmari (born 26 September 1960) is a Kuwaiti football defender who played for Kuwait in the 1982 FIFA World Cup. He also played for Kazma Sporting Club.
