= Benjamin Dwomoh =

Ghanaian football referee (1935–2013)

- Born: 1 July 1935; Ghana
- Died: 2 October 2013 (aged 78)

International
Years	League	Role

Benjamin Dwomoh (1 July 1935 – 2 October 2013) was a Ghanaian football referee. He refereed one match in the 1982 FIFA World Cup in Spain, between Kuwait and Czechoslovakia in Valladolid.
