= Mohammed Karam =

Kuwaiti footballer

Personal information
- Full name: Mohammed Ahmed Karam
- Date of birth: 1 January 1955 (age 71)
- Place of birth: Kuwait
- Height: 1.78 m (5 ft 10 in)
- Position: Midfielder

Senior career*
Years	Team	Apps	(Gls)
1972–1986	Al-Arabi		

International career
1975–1984	Kuwait		

Managerial career
- 1990: Kuwait
- 1994–1995: Al-Arabi
- 1995: Al-Salmiya
- 2004: Al-Arabi
- * Club domestic league appearances and goals

Mohammed Ahmed Karam (born 1 January 1955) is a Kuwaiti football midfielder who played for Kuwait in the 1982 FIFA World Cup. He also played for Al-Arabi SC.
