= Ahmed Al-Tarabulsi =

Footballer (born 1947)

Personal information
- Full name: Ahmad Khader Al-Tarabulsi Mubarak
- Date of birth: 18 March 1947 (age 79)
- Place of birth: Beirut, Lebanon
- Height: 1.72 m (5 ft 8 in)
- Position: Goalkeeper

Youth career
- Nejmeh

Senior career*
Years	Team	Apps	(Gls)
1963–1964	Qadsia		
1964–1983	Kuwait SC		

International career
1972–1982	Kuwait		

Managerial career
- 1985–1995: Kuwait (goalkeeper coach)
- * Club domestic league appearances and goals

Ahmad Khader Al-Tarabulsi Mubarak (Arabic: أحمد خضر الطرابلسي مبارك; born 18 March 1947) is a former professional footballer who played as a goalkeeper. Born in Lebanon, he played for the Kuwait national team.

== Club career ==
Starting his career in his native Lebanon at Nejmeh, Al-Tarabulsi moved to Kuwait in his twenties and played for Qadsia and Kuwait SC.

== International career ==
Al-Tarabulsi was born in Lebanon in 1947; after moving to Kuwait, he received citizenship in order to play for the Kuwait national team.

He took part at the 1980 Summer Olympics, and the 1982 World Cup, playing against Czechoslovakia and England.

== Personal life ==
Following his retirement as a footballer, Al-Tarabulsi became an army officer and rose through the ranks to the position of colonel. He was also known for his Quran recitation and giving the call to prayer several mosques around the country.

== Withdrawal of Kuwaiti citizenship ==
On 25 January 2026, Kuwaiti authorities revoked Al-Tarabulsi's citizenship as part of a broader campaign affecting numerous individuals, including public figures and their families. The decision drew public criticism and media attention, with commentators highlighting his contributions to Kuwaiti sports and society.
