= AFC Asian Cup =

Association football tournament

- Organiser(s): AFC
- Founded: 1956; 70 years ago
- Region: Asia and Australia
- Teams: 24 (finals); 47 (eligible to enter qualification)
- Current champions: Qatar (2nd title)
- Most championships: Japan (4 titles)
- Website: the-afc.com
- 2027 AFC Asian Cup

The AFC Asian Cup is the primary association football competition contested by the senior men's national teams of the members of the Asian Football Confederation (AFC), determining the continental champion of Asia. It is the second-oldest continental football championship in the world after Copa América. The winning team becomes the champions of Asia and, until 2015, qualified for the FIFA Confederations Cup.

The Asian Cup was held once every four years from the 1956 AFC Asian Cup in Hong Kong until the 2004 tournament in China. That year, since the Summer Olympic Games and the European Football Championship were also scheduled in the same year as the Asian Cup, the AFC decided to move their championship to a less crowded cycle. After 2004, the tournament was next held in 2007, when it was co-hosted by four countries in Southeast Asia: Indonesia, Malaysia, Thailand and Vietnam. Thereafter, it has again been held every four years.

The Asian Cup has generally been dominated by a small number of top teams. Prominently successful teams include Japan (four times), Iran, Saudi Arabia (three times each), South Korea and Qatar (twice each). The other teams which have achieved success are Australia (2015), Iraq (2007) and Kuwait (1980). Israel won in 1964 but was later expelled and has since joined UEFA.

Australia joined the Asian confederation in 2007 and hosted the Asian Cup finals in 2015, winning the competition in the final against South Korea. From the 2019 tournament forward, the number of teams was expanded from 16 teams to 24 teams, with the qualifying process doubling as part of the FIFA World Cup qualification.

== History ==
=== Beginning ===
A pan-Asian competition was first proposed after the end of World War II, but it was not implemented until the 1950s. Two years after the Asian Football Confederation (AFC) came into being in 1954, the first ever AFC Asian Cup was staged in British Hong Kong with seven of the twelve founding members taking part, making the tournament the second oldest continental competition in the world. The qualifying process involved the hosts plus the winners of the various zones (Central, Eastern and Western). It was only a four-team tournament, a format that also existed for 1960 and 1964. Each sub-confederation already hosts their own biennial championship, each with varying degrees of interest.

South Korea demonstrated its superiority in the early years of the competition as the country won the championship in both 1956 and 1960; this remains as South Korea's best achievements in the tournament.

=== West Asian domination (1964–1988) ===
After Hong Kong and South Korea hosted the two first editions, Israel was chosen as host of the 1964 AFC Asian Cup. Using the same format of the two previous editions, this tournament only had four teams and played in one single group to determine the champions. Israel eventually topped the tournament ahead of India with three wins. The format was updated to five teams in 1968 before it was expanded to six teams in 1972 and 1976.

The tournament became the preserve of Iran who won three consecutive tournaments in 1968, 1972 and 1976, with Iran hosting the former and the latter. Iran remains as the only national team in Asia to have won three consecutive Asian Cups. The 1972 final was notable as it was the first Asian Cup to use the group stage-knockout phase format, which was followed in the subsequent tournaments with some alternation. Israel was expelled from the AFC in 1972 due to the Arab–Israeli conflict.

In 1976, China was enabled to take part in the competition after the dispute between the People's Republic and the Republic of China (Taiwan) as to who the legitimate successor to China was reached a settlement with the United Nations' General Assembly Resolution 2758. The ROC ceased to be referred to as such and began being called Chinese Taipei, whereas the PRC was granted the right to compete under the name of China. On their debut, the Dragon Team finished in third place.

From 1980 to 1988, the number of teams taking part expanded to ten, but West Asian countries continued their domination in the 1980s with Kuwait becoming the first Arab country to win the championship in 1980 held at home soil, beating South Korea 3–0 in the final. Saudi Arabia, after an initial poor start, began to emerge as the country qualified, then won two consecutive Asian trophies in 1984 and 1988, overcoming both China and South Korea. Both tournaments were Saudi Arabia's debuts in any major competitions.

=== Japan's rise and modernization of Asian Cup (1992–2015) ===
Until the 1990s, Japan was mostly a small name in Asian football, and the country only qualified for the 1988 edition, the first time Japan took part in a continental football tournament. However, as Japan started to make a concrete move inroad to professional football, the country's fortunes increased. Japan hosted the 1992 AFC Asian Cup, which was reduced to eight teams and two groups, where it emerged victorious after beating Saudi Arabia, then-defending champions, 1–0, to win the country's first major international honour.

The 1996 AFC Asian Cup saw the tournament expand to twelve teams in its process of professionalization. Held by the United Arab Emirates, the hosts breached into the final for the first time ever but were unable to win the trophy after losing to Saudi Arabia, who made it into the country's fourth consecutive Asian finals, on penalties. It was Saudi Arabia's third Asian title.

The 2000 AFC Asian Cup saw Lebanon take part in its first Asian tournament, and it was Saudi Arabia who again reached the final, but this time, Japan triumphed over Saudi Arabia 1–0 in a final filled with a majority of Saudi supporters. Japan would go on to retain their Asian trophy four years later, albeit in a more struggling style and a very heated, politically charged final toward hosts China. The 2004 edition was notable as it expanded to 16 teams, and marked Saudi Arabia's absence from an Asian Cup final for the first time.

The 2007 AFC Asian Cup was the debut of Australia, which had abandoned the Oceania Football Confederation in 2006 (coincidentally the first team to qualify for the tournament), as well as being the first football competition in the world to be hosted by more than two nations, with four countries in Southeast Asia (Indonesia, Malaysia, Thailand, and Vietnam) hosting. In this tournament, Iraq was crowned as Asian champions despite the ravaging American invasion, overpowering the likes of Australia, South Korea and Saudi Arabia in the process.

Australia (which joined the AFC in 2006), after its poor debut in 2007, rebounded to reach the final in 2011 AFC Asian Cup in Qatar, but lost to Japan after extra-time; the win for Japan meant it became the most decorated team in Asian football with four titles. Still, the tournament was notable as the first Asian Cup to use the jersey numbers' order from 1 to 23, previously not practised in prior competitions.

Following Australia's successes in the 2011 Asian Cup, the AFC approved the country to host the 2015 AFC Asian Cup. At the tournament, Australia managed to clamp down every opponent with only one loss, against eventual finalist South Korea, whom Australia would get a 2–1 final revenge after extra-time; the win officially sealed Southeast Asia's first Asian title as Australia joined the AFF in 2013.

=== Expansion and West Asian hosts (2019–present) ===
At the 2019 AFC Asian Cup, video assistant referees were used in the tournament for the first time, and the tournament expanded to 24 teams. In addition, a fourth substitution was allowed during extra time. The tournament, hosted by the United Arab Emirates for the second time, witnessed the rise of Qatar, who conquered its first ever Asian title after beating Japan in the final 3–1. The tournament was marred by the Qatar diplomatic crisis, due to the UAE's entry ban on Qatari supporters, as well as shoe-throwing in the two teams' semi-final clash.

At the 2023 AFC Asian Cup, hosts and defending champions Qatar won their second title in a row, winning against Jordan in the final. The tournament also featured Yoshimi Yamashita as the first woman to referee at the Asian Cup.

=== Future editions ===
The 2027 AFC Asian Cup would be the final time the tournament held on odd-numbered years, having been so since 2007. The AFC confirmed to move the tournament to even-numbered years, because of a potential revisions to the FIFA International Match Calendar.

== Format ==
=== Final tournament ===
Since 1972, the final tournament has been played in two stages: the group stage and the knockout stage.

Since 2019, the Asian Cup final tournament has been contested by 24 teams, having been expanded from the 16-team format that was used from 2004 to 2015. Each team plays three games in a group of four, with the winners and runners-up from each group advancing to the knockout stage along with four best third-placed teams. In the knockout stage, the sixteen teams compete in a single-elimination tournament, beginning with the round of 16 and ending with the final match of the tournament.

Year	Teams	Matches	Format
1956	4	6	round-robin group of 4
1960	4	6	round-robin group of 4
1964	4	6	round-robin group of 4
1968	5	10	round-robin group of 5
1972	6	13	group allocation matches, 2 groups of 3, semi-finals, 3rd-place match, final
1976	6	10	2 groups of 3, semi-finals, 3rd-place match, final
1980	10	24	2 groups of 5, semi-finals, 3rd-place match, final
1984	10	24	2 groups of 5, semi-finals, 3rd-place match, final
1988	10	24	2 groups of 5, semi-finals, 3rd-place match, final
1992	8	16	2 groups of 4, semi-finals, 3rd-place match, final
1996	12	26	3 groups of 4, quarter-finals, semi-finals, 3rd-place match, final
2000	12	26	3 groups of 4, quarter-finals, semi-finals, 3rd-place match, final
2004	16	32	4 groups of 4, quarter-finals, semi-finals, 3rd-place match, final
2007	16	32	4 groups of 4, quarter-finals, semi-finals, 3rd-place match, final
2011	16	32	4 groups of 4, quarter-finals, semi-finals, 3rd-place match, final
2015	16	32	4 groups of 4, quarter-finals, semi-finals, 3rd-place match, final
2019	24	51	6 groups of 4, round of 16, quarter-finals, semi-finals, final
2023	24	51	6 groups of 4, round of 16, quarter-finals, semi-finals, final
2027	24	51	6 groups of 4, round of 16, quarter-finals, semi-finals, final

== Trophy ==
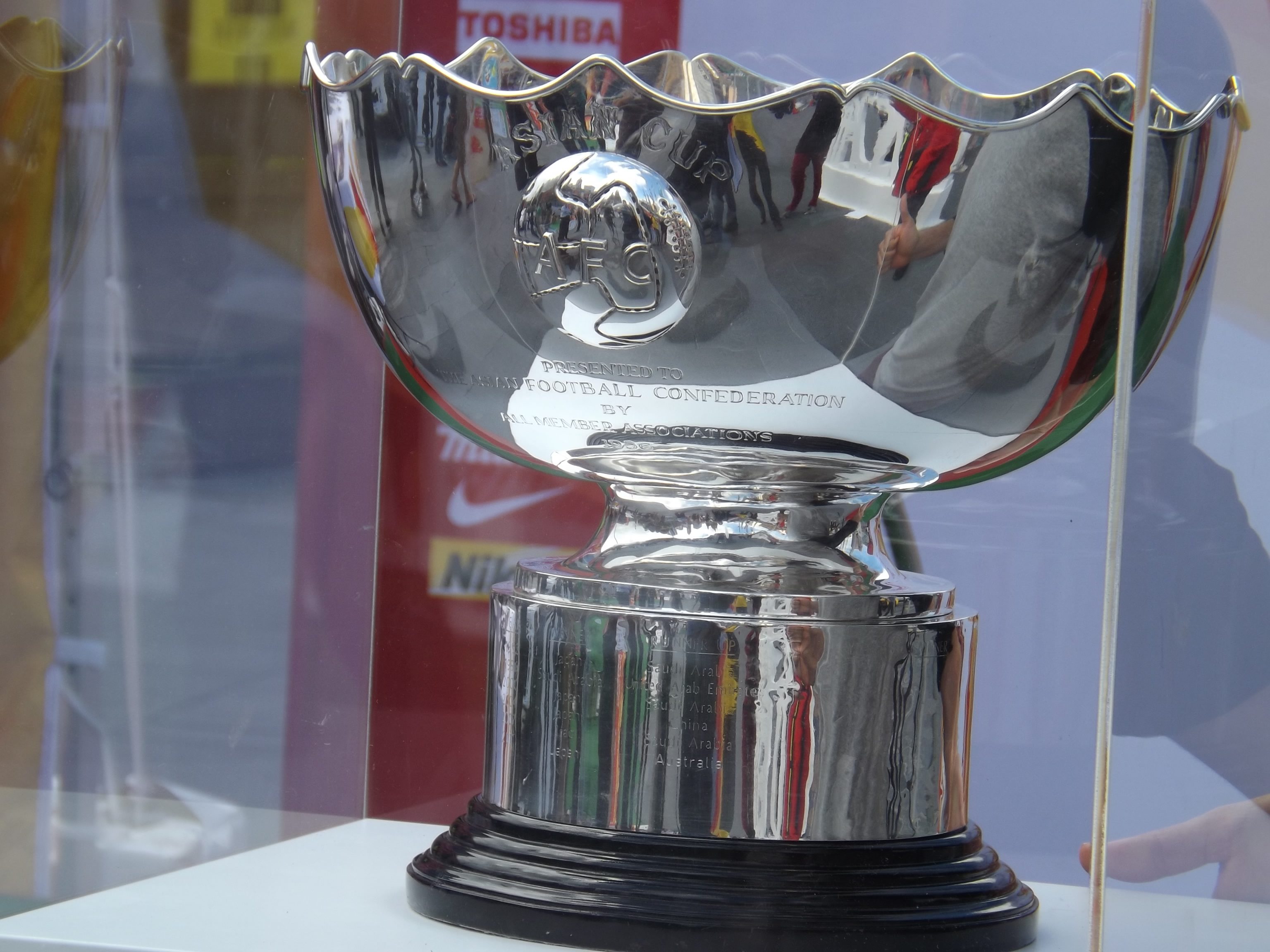
The original trophy launched in 1956, in use until 2015.

There have been two Asian Cup trophies; the first one used between 1956 and 2015, and the second one in use since 2019.

The first trophy came in the form of a bowl with circular base. It was 42 centimetres tall and weighed 15 kilograms. Until the 2000 tournament, the black base contained plaques engraved with names of every winning country, as well as the edition won. The trophy was redesigned, adding more silver and reducing the black base to just a thin layer down. This base was plaque-free and the winning countries' names were engraved around the base.

During the draw for the 2019 group stage on 4 May 2018 at the Burj Khalifa in Dubai, an all-new trophy, made by London silversmiths Thomas Lyte, was unveiled. It is 78 centimetres tall, 42 centimetres wide, and weighs 15 kilograms of sterling silver. The trophy is modelled after the lotus flower, a symbolically important aquatic Asian plant. The five petals of the lotus symbolize the five sub-confederations under the AFC. The winning countries' names are engraved around the trophy base, which is separable from the trophy's main body. The trophy has a handle on each side.

== Results ==
Key

- aet: result/match won after extra time
- p: match won after penalty shoot-out
- TBD: to be determined

Ed.	Year	Hosts	Final			Third-place match / Losing semi-finalists			Teams
Ed.	Year	Hosts	Champions	Score	Runners-up	Third place	Score	Fourth place	Teams
1	1956	Hong Kong	South Korea	round-robin	Israel	Hong Kong	round-robin	South Vietnam	4
2	1960	South Korea	South Korea	round-robin	Israel	Republic of China	round-robin	South Vietnam	4
3	1964	Israel	Israel	round-robin	India	South Korea	round-robin	Hong Kong	4
4	1968	Iran	Iran	round-robin	Burma	Israel	round-robin	Republic of China	5
5	1972	Thailand	Iran	2–1 (a.e.t.)	South Korea	Thailand	2–2 (a.e.t.) (5–3 p)	Khmer Republic	6
6	1976	Iran	Iran	1–0	Kuwait	China	1–0	Iraq	6
7	1980	Kuwait	Kuwait	3–0	South Korea	Iran	3–0	North Korea	10
8	1984	Singapore	Saudi Arabia	2–0	China	Kuwait	1–1 (a.e.t.) (5–3 p)	Iran	10
9	1988	Qatar	Saudi Arabia	0–0 (a.e.t.) (4–3 p)	South Korea	Iran	0–0 (a.e.t.) (3–0 p)	China	10
10	1992	Japan	Japan	1–0	Saudi Arabia	China	1–1 (a.e.t.) (4–3 p)	United Arab Emirates	8
11	1996	United Arab Emirates	Saudi Arabia	0–0 (a.e.t.) (4–2 p)	United Arab Emirates	Iran	1–1 (a.e.t.) (3–2 p)	Kuwait	12
12	2000	Lebanon	Japan	1–0	Saudi Arabia	South Korea	1–0	China	12
13	2004	China	Japan	3–1	China	Iran	4–2	Bahrain	16
14	2007	Indonesia; Malaysia; Thailand; Vietnam	Iraq	1–0	Saudi Arabia	South Korea	0–0 (a.e.t.) (6–5 p)	Japan	16
15	2011	Qatar	Japan	1–0 (a.e.t.)	Australia	South Korea	3–2	Uzbekistan	16
16	2015	Australia	Australia	2–1 (a.e.t.)	South Korea	United Arab Emirates	3–2	Iraq	16
17	2019	United Arab Emirates	Qatar	3–1	Japan	Iran and United Arab Emirates			24
18	2023 (Note: Played in 2024, while retaining the original name for both existing sponsorship and logistical purposes.)	Qatar	Qatar	3–1	Jordan	Iran and South Korea			24
19	2027	Saudi Arabia							24

== Teams reaching the top four ==
First four edition of competition only had four or five teams and played in one single group. Since 1972, the final tournament has introduced the knockout stage. Since 2019, no third place play-off has been played; from 2023, losing semi-finalists are ranked by the AFC based on goal difference in the semi-finals.

Bold text denotes the team was representing the host country.

Team	Champions	Runners-up	Third place	Fourth place	Semi-finalists	Top 4 total
Japan	4 (**1992**, 2000, 2004, 2011)	1 (2019)	—N/a	1 (2007)	—N/a	6
Saudi Arabia	3 (1984, 1988, 1996)	3 (1992, 2000, 2007)	—N/a	—N/a	—N/a	6
Iran	3 (**1968**, 1972, **1976**)	—N/a	4 (1980, 1988, 1996, 2004)	1 (1984)	2 (2019, 2023)	10
South Korea	2 (1956, **1960**)	4 (1972, 1980, 1988, 2015)	4 (1964, 2000, 2007, 2011)	—N/a	1 (2023)	11
Qatar	2 (2019, **2023**)	—N/a	—N/a	—N/a	—N/a	2
Israel	1 (**1964**)	2 (1956, 1960)	1 (1968)	—N/a	—N/a	4
Kuwait	1 (**1980**)	1 (1976)	1 (1984)	1 (1996)	—N/a	4
Australia	1 (**2015**)	1 (2011)	—N/a	—N/a	—N/a	2
Iraq	1 (2007)	—N/a	—N/a	2 (1976, 2015)	—N/a	3
China	—N/a	2 (1984, **2004**)	2 (1976, 1992)	2 (1988, 2000)	—N/a	6
United Arab Emirates	—N/a	1 (**1996**)	1 (2015)	1 (1992)	1 (**2019**)	4
India	—N/a	1 (1964)	—N/a	—N/a	—N/a	1
Myanmar (Note: Burma until 1989.)	—N/a	1 (1968)	—N/a	—N/a	—N/a	1
Jordan	—N/a	1 (2023)	—N/a	—N/a	—N/a	1
Hong Kong	—N/a	—N/a	1 (**1956**)	1 (1964)	—N/a	2
Chinese Taipei (Note: Republic of China until 1980.)	—N/a	—N/a	1 (1960)	1 (1968)	—N/a	2
Thailand	—N/a	—N/a	1 (**1972**)	—N/a	—N/a	1
Vietnam (Note: Including results representing South Vietnam.)	—N/a	—N/a	—N/a	2 (1956, 1960)	—N/a	2
Cambodia (Note: Khmer Republic from 1970 to 1975.)	—N/a	—N/a	—N/a	1 (1972)	—N/a	1
North Korea	—N/a	—N/a	—N/a	1 (1980)	—N/a	1
Bahrain	—N/a	—N/a	—N/a	1 (2004)	—N/a	1
Uzbekistan	—N/a	—N/a	—N/a	1 (2011)	—N/a	1

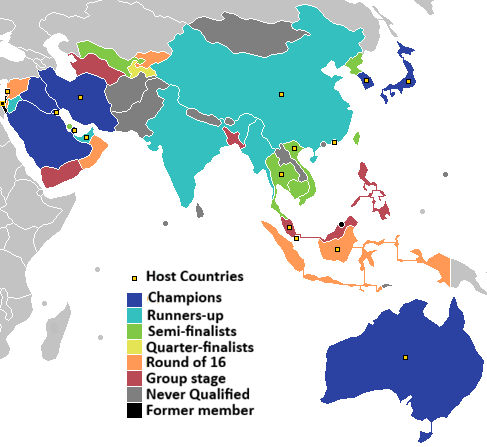

== Awards ==
There are currently five post-tournament awards:

- the Most Valuable Player for best player;
- the Top Goalscorer for most prolific goal scorer;
- the Best Goalkeeper for most outstanding goalkeeper;
- the Team of the Tournament for best combined team of players at the tournament;
- the Fair Play Award for the team with the best record of fair play.

== Controversies ==
Despite being the second oldest continental football tournament, the AFC Asian Cup has suffered numerous criticisms. Criticisms over the inability of the AFC Asian Cup to attract large attendances, political interference, high costs of traveling between AFC member states and different cultures were highlighted over the Asian Cup.

=== Political interference ===
The AFC Asian Cup is marked with numerous instances of political interference. One of these was the case of Israel, as the team used to be a member of the AFC but following the Yom Kippur War and increasing hostility from the Arab AFC members, Israel was expelled from the AFC in 1974 and had to compete in the OFC, until being granted UEFA membership in 1990. Meanwhile, similar cases also exist in other AFC tournaments like the one between Saudi Arabia and Iran. Following the 2016 attack on the Saudi diplomatic missions in Iran, Saudi Arabia refused to play against Iran and even threatened to withdraw, afterwards blowing over onto international level. Tensions between the two Koreas during qualification for the 2010 FIFA World Cup led North Korea to withdraw from hosting the South Korean team and refusing to display the South Korean flag and play their national anthem. As a result, North Korea's home matches were moved to Shanghai.

=== Low attendances ===
Low crowds have also been another problem for the AFC Asian Cup. At the 2011 AFC Asian Cup, there were concerns over low record of crowds due to little football interests and high costs of traveling between Asian nations leading to then-Australia coach Holger Osieck claiming that the Qatar Armed Forces were used to fill up the stadiums simply for aesthetics, while Australia international Brett Holman commented, "Worldwide it's not recognized as a good tournament".

In 2010, Qatar was chosen as the host country for the 2022 FIFA World Cup. The country became the first in the Middle East to host the world's biggest sporting event, triumphing over strong competition from the United States and Australia. Approximately 5 billion people were involved in the FIFA World Cup Qatar 2022, as they followed tournament content through various platforms and devices in the media universe.

On 10 February 2024, the AFC announced that the tournament in Qatar had surpassed the previous total attendance record of 1.04 million set during the 2004 tournament in China, with a new record of 1.06 million. This achievement was reached prior to the quarter-final stage.

== See also ==
- Asian Games
- AFC Women's Asian Cup
- Asian Quadrangular Football Tournament
- AFC Asian Cup qualifiers
- AFC U-23 Asian Cup
- AFC U-20 Asian Cup
- AFC U-17 Asian Cup
- ASEAN Championship
- CAFA Championship
- EAFF E-1 Football Championship
- SAFF Championship
- WAFF Championship
