= Abdullah Mayouf =

Kuwaiti footballer

Personal information
- Full name: Abdullah Yusuf Mayouf
- Date of birth: 3 December 1953 (age 72)
- Place of birth: Kuwait
- Height: 1.78 m (5 ft 10 in)
- Position: Defender

Senior career*
Years	Team	Apps	(Gls)
1970–1986	Kazma SC		

International career
1972–1984	Kuwait		
- * Club domestic league appearances and goals

Abdullah Yusuf Mayouf (born 3 December 1953) is a Kuwaiti football defender who played for Kuwait in the 1982 FIFA World Cup. He also played for Kazma Sporting Club. Mayouf is also a former deputy in the Kuwaiti National Assembly.
