= Waleed Al-Jasem =

Kuwaiti footballer (1959–2025)

Personal information
- Full name: Waleed S. Al-Jasem Al-Mubarak
- Date of birth: 18 November 1959
- Place of birth: Kuwait
- Date of death: 26 May 2025 (aged 65)
- Place of death: Paris, France
- Height: 1.62 m (5 ft 4 in)
- Position: Left back

Senior career*
Years	Team	Apps	(Gls)
1977–1990	Kuwait SC		

International career
1977–1979	Kuwait U-19		
1979–1989	Kuwait	44	(0)
- * Club domestic league appearances and goals

Waleed S. Al-Jasem Al-Mubarak (18 November 1959 – 26 May 2025) was a Kuwaiti footballer who played as a defender. He represented Kuwait at the 1982 FIFA World Cup. He also played for Kuwait SC. Al-Jasem died on 26 May 2025, at the age of 65.

== See also ==
- List of one-club men in association football
