= Naeem Saad =

Kuwaiti footballer

Personal information
- Full name: Naeem Saad Mubarak Faraj
- Date of birth: 1 October 1957 (age 69)
- Place of birth: Kuwait
- Height: 1.72 m (5 ft 7 1/2 in)
- Position: Defender

Senior career*
Years	Team	Apps	(Gls)
1975–1990	Tadamon		

International career
1979–1989	Kuwait	51	(2)
- * Club domestic league appearances and goals

Naeem Saad Mubarak Faraj (Arabic: نَعِيم سَعْد مُبَارَك فَرَج; born 1 October 1957) is a Kuwaiti footballer who played as a defender. He represented Kuwait in the 1982 FIFA World Cup. He also played for Tadamon.
