= Jamal Al-Qabendi =

Kuwaiti footballer (1959–2021)

Personal information
- Full name: Jamal Yaqoub Al-Qabendi
- Date of birth: 7 April 1959
- Place of birth: Kuwait
- Date of death: 13 April 2021 (aged 62)
- Height: 1.72 m (5 ft 8 in)
- Position: Defender

Senior career*
Years	Team	Apps	(Gls)
1976–1990	Kazma SC		

International career
1979–1990	Kuwait	25	(3)

Managerial career
- 2010: Kazma
- * Club domestic league appearances and goals

Jamal Yaqoub Al-Qabendi (7 April 1959 in Kazmi – 13 April 2021) was a Kuwaiti footballer who played as a defender. He represented Kuwait in the 1982 FIFA World Cup. He also played for Kazma Sporting Club.

He died on 13 April 2021 from diabetes-related complications.
