= Stanislav Seman =

Czechoslovak footballer (born 1952)

Personal information
- Date of birth: 8 August 1952 (age 74)
- Place of birth: Košice, Czechoslovakia
- Height: 1.85 m (6 ft 1 in)
- Position: Goalkeeper

Youth career
- 1963–1970: Lokomotíva Košice

Senior career*
Years	Team	Apps	(Gls)
1970–1972	Lokomotíva Košice		
1972–1974	Dukla Banská Bystrica		
1974–1984	Lokomotíva Košice		
1984–1987	Nea Salamis		

International career
1980–1982	Czechoslovakia	15	(0)
- * Club domestic league appearances and goals

Stanislav Seman
Medal record

Representing Czechoslovakia

Men's Football
Gold medal – first place	1980 Moscow	Team competition

Stanislav Seman (born 8 August 1952) is a former football goalkeeper from Czechoslovakia. He was a member of the national team that won the gold medal at the 1980 Summer Olympics in Moscow. Seman obtained a total number of fifteen caps for his native country, between 30 April 1980 and 20 June 1982. He was born in Košice.
