= Fathi Kameel =

Kuwaiti footballer (1955–2026)

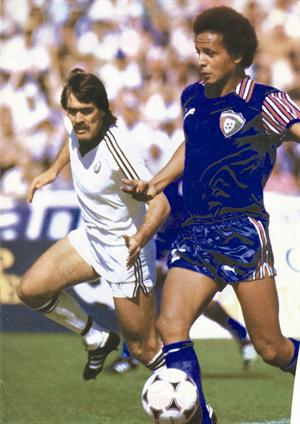
- Kameel in 1982

Personal information
- Full name: Fathi Kameel Matar Marzouq
- Date of birth: 23 May 1955
- Place of birth: Kuwait City, Kuwait
- Date of death: 31 January 2026 (aged 70)
- Height: 1.80 m (5 ft 11 in)
- Position: Forward

Youth career
- Al-Muthanna Primary School

Senior career*
Years	Team	Apps	(Gls)
1971–1988	Al-Tadamon		

International career
1973–1984	Kuwait		
- * Club domestic league appearances and goals

Fathi Kameel Matar Marzouq (Arabic: فَتْحِيّ كَمِيل مَطَر مَرْزُوق; 23 May 1955 – 31 January 2026) was a Kuwaiti footballer who played as a forward in the late 1970s and early 1980s.

== Club career ==
Nicknamed Al-Faris Al-Asmar (The Dark Knight), Kameel spent his entire career with Al-Tadamon.

== International career ==
He helped Kuwait qualify for the World Cup in 1982 by scoring a goal against New Zealand. Fathi also helped Kuwait win the Asian Cup in 1980. He was joint top-scorer at the 1976 AFC Asian Cup with three goals, and appeared in all three of their games at the finals in Spain. He also played for Kuwait at the 1980 Summer Olympics. Kameel died on 31 January 2026, at the age of 70.
