= Abdulaziz Al-Anberi =

Kuwaiti footballer (born 1954)

Personal information
- Full name: Abdulaziz Al-Anberi
- Date of birth: 3 January 1954 (age 72)
- Place of birth: Kaifan Kuwait
- Height: 1.71 m (5 ft 7 in)
- Position: Forward

Senior career*
Years	Team	Apps	(Gls)
1971–1988	Kuwait SC		

International career
1974–1986	Kuwait		
- * Club domestic league appearances and goals

Abdulaziz Al-Anberi, also spelled Abdul-Aziz Al-Anbari (born 3 January 1954 in Kaifan), is a Kuwaiti former professional footballer.

== Career ==
Al-Anberi began his sporting career as a basketball and volleyball player. However, in 1976, he decided to focus on football, his favourite sport. He began playing for Kuwait SC as a youth player and continued until he was promoted to the first team.

Al-Anberi was a member of the Kuwait squad that won the 1980 AFC Asian Cup and the squad that qualified for the 1982 World Cup.
