= Saad Al-Houti =

Kuwaiti footballer

Sa'ad Al-Houti
Personal information
- Full name: Sa'ad Mohammad Abdulaziz Al-Houti
- Date of birth: 24 May 1954 (age 72)
- Place of birth: Kuwait
- Height: 1.64 m (5 ft 4 1/2 in)
- Position: Midfielder

Senior career*
Years	Team	Apps	(Gls)
1970–1984	Kuwait SC		

International career
1971–1982	Kuwait		
- * Club domestic league appearances and goals

Sa'ad Mohammad Abdulaziz Al-Houti (Arabic: سَعْد مُحَمَّد عَبْد الْعَزِيز الْحُوطِيّ; born 24 May 1954) is a Kuwaiti former football midfielder who played for Kuwait in the 1982 FIFA World Cup. He also played for Kuwait SC.
