= Mahboub Juma'a =

Kuwaiti footballer

Mahboub Juma'a Mahboub Mubarak
Personal information
- Full name: Mahboub Juma'a Mahboub Mubarak
- Date of birth: 17 September 1955 (age 71)
- Place of birth: Kuwait
- Height: 1.69 m (5 ft 6 1/2 in)
- Position: Defender

Senior career*
Years	Team	Apps	(Gls)
1972–1993	Al-Salmiya		

International career
1976–1990	Kuwait	101	(4)
- * Club domestic league appearances and goals

Mahboub Juma'a Mahboub Mubarak (Arabic: مَحْبُوب جُمْعَة مَحْبُوب مُبَارَك; born 17 September 1955) is a Kuwaiti former footballer who played as a defender. He represented Kuwait in the 1982 FIFA World Cup. He also played for Al-Salmiya SC.

== See also ==
- List of men's footballers with 100 or more international caps
