= 1980 AFC Asian Cup squads =

Squad lists of 1980 AFC Asian Cup national teams

Squads for the 1980 AFC Asian Cup tournament.

== Group A ==
=== Bangladesh ===
Head coach: (Bangladesh) Abdur Rahim

No.	Pos.	Player	Date of birth (age)	Caps	Goals	Club
	GK	Shahidur Rahman Shantoo	17 November 1947 (aged 32)			(Bangladesh Football Federation) Brothers Union
	GK	Wahiduzzaman Khan Pintu				(Bangladesh Football Federation) Mohammedan SC
	DF	Shahid Uddin Ahmed Selim (c)	23 July 1953 (aged 27)			(Bangladesh Football Federation) Brothers Union
	DF	Khandaker Rakibul Islam	1 January 1956 (aged 24)			(Bangladesh Football Federation) Abahani Krira Chakra
	DF	Abul Hossain	2 July 1957 (aged 23)			(Bangladesh Football Federation) Mohammedan SC
	DF	Mohammad Abu Yusuf	11 September 1957 (aged 23)			(Bangladesh Football Federation) Mohammedan SC
	DF	Aminur Rahman	1 December 1954 (aged 25)			(Bangladesh Football Federation) Team BJMC
	DF	Mostafa Hossain Mukul	12 November 1957 (aged 22)			(Bangladesh Football Federation) Team BJMC
	MF	Kowsar Ali	20 November 1958 (aged 21)			(Bangladesh Football Federation) Team BJMC
	MF	Ashish Bhadra	14 March 1960 (aged 20)			(Bangladesh Football Federation) Rahmatganj MFS
	MF	Mohammed Mohsin	3 April 1963 (aged 17)			(Bangladesh Football Federation) Brothers Union
	MF	Khurshid Alam Babul	1 March 1955 (aged 25)			(Bangladesh Football Federation) Abahani Krira Chakra
	FW	Kazi Anwar Hossain	2 June 1957 (aged 23)			(Bangladesh Football Federation) Abahani Krira Chakra
	FW	Hasanuzzaman Khan Bablu	5 May 1955 (aged 25)			(Bangladesh Football Federation) Brothers Union
	FW	Sheikh Mohammad Aslam	1 March 1958 (aged 22)			(Bangladesh Football Federation) Team BJMC
	MF	Kazi Salahuddin	23 September 1954 (aged 25)			(Bangladesh Football Federation) Abahani Krira Chakra
	FW	Abdus Salam Murshedy	16 November 1963 (aged 16)			(Bangladesh Football Federation) Mohammedan SC
	MF	Ashraf Uddin Ahmed Chunnu	1 August 1956 (aged 24)			(Bangladesh Football Federation) Abahani Krira Chakra

=== China ===
Head coach: (China) Su Yongshun

No.	Pos.	Player	Date of birth (age)	Caps	Goals	Club
1	GK	Li Fusheng	4 January 1953 (aged 27)			(Chinese Football Association) Bayi Football Team
2	DF	Cai Jinbiao	1954			(Chinese Football Association) Guangdong Provincial team
3	DF	Liu Zhicai	20 October 1954 (aged 25)			(Chinese Football Association) Bayi Football Team
4	DF	Lin Lefeng	16 October 1955 (aged 24)			(Chinese Football Association) Liaoning F.C.
5	DF	Chi Shangbin	19 September 1949 (aged 30)			(Chinese Football Association) Liaoning FC
6	MF	Huang Xiangdong	22 March 1958 (aged 22)			(Chinese Football Association) Kunming Army Unit
7	FW	Yang Yumin	1 January 1955 (aged 25)			(Chinese Football Association) Liaoning FC
8	MF	Zuo Shusheng	13 April 1958 (aged 22)			(Chinese Football Association) Tianjin City
9	FW	Xu Yonglai	16 August 1954 (aged 26)			(Chinese Football Association) Shandong
10	FW	Li Fubao	1954			(Chinese Football Association) Hubei
11	MF	Chen Jingang	17 February 1958 (aged 22)			(Chinese Football Association) Tianjin City
12	DF	Zang Cailing	18 May 1954 (aged 26)			(Chinese Football Association) Central contract
13	FW	Shen Xiangfu	27 May 1957 (aged 23)			(Chinese Football Association) Beijing Team
15	FW	Gu Guangming	31 January 1959 (aged 21)			(Chinese Football Association) Guangdong Provincial team
16	DF	Wang Feng	1956			(Chinese Football Association) Guangxi
18	MF	Gai Zengchen	6 April 1955 (aged 25)			(Chinese Football Association) Liaoning
20	MF	Chen Xirong	1953			(Chinese Football Association) Guangdong Provincial team
22	GK	Xu Jianping	1 February 1955 (aged 25)			(Chinese Football Association) Tianjin City

=== Iran ===
Head coach: (Iran) Hassan Habibi

No.	Pos.	Player	Date of birth (age)	Caps	Goals	Club
1	GK	Nasser Hejazi	14 December 1949 (aged 30)			(Football Federation Islamic Republic of Iran) Esteghlal F.C.
	GK	Karim Boostani	21 March 1952 (aged 28)			(Football Federation Islamic Republic of Iran) Niroo Ahvaz F.C.
	DF	Nasrollah Abdollahi	2 September 1951 (aged 29)			(Football Federation Islamic Republic of Iran) Shahin F.C.
	DF	Mohammad Panjali	26 July 1955 (aged 25)			(Football Federation Islamic Republic of Iran) Persepolis F.C.
	DF	Habib Khabiri	15 August 1954 (aged 26)			(Football Federation Islamic Republic of Iran) Homa F.C.
	DF	Mehdi Dinvarzadeh	12 March 1955 (aged 25)			(Football Federation Islamic Republic of Iran) Shahin F.C.
	MF	Mahmoud Haghighian	16 November 1954 (aged 25)			(Football Federation Islamic Republic of Iran) Shahin F.C.
	MF	Hedayat Shoaar Ghaffari	13 December 1953 (aged 26)			(Football Federation Islamic Republic of Iran) Esteghlal F.C.
	MF	Amir Marzoughi				(Football Federation Islamic Republic of Iran) Shahin F.C.
	MF	Ahmad Sanjari	22 February 1960 (aged 20)			(Football Federation Islamic Republic of Iran) Homa F.C.
	MF	Hamid Derakhshan	23 January 1959 (aged 21)			(Football Federation Islamic Republic of Iran) Persepolis F.C.
	MF	Iraj Danaeifard	11 March 1951 (aged 29)			(Football Federation Islamic Republic of Iran) Esteghlal F.C.
	MF	Gholamreza Naalchegar	13 April 1958 (aged 22)			(Football Federation Islamic Republic of Iran) Esteghlal F.C.
	MF	Abdolreza Barzegari	3 July 1958 (aged 22)			(Football Federation Islamic Republic of Iran) Sanat Naft Abadan F.C.
	MF	Hamid Alidoosti	12 March 1956 (aged 24)			(Football Federation Islamic Republic of Iran) Homa F.C.
10	FW	Hossein Faraki	22 March 1957 (aged 23)			(Football Federation Islamic Republic of Iran) PAS Tehran F.C.
	FW	Behtash Fariba	11 February 1955 (aged 25)			(Football Federation Islamic Republic of Iran) Esteghlal F.C.
	FW	Hassan Rowshan	2 June 1955 (aged 25)			(Football Federation Islamic Republic of Iran) Esteghlal F.C.
	FW	Gholamreza Fathabadi				(Football Federation Islamic Republic of Iran) Esteghlal F.C.

=== North Korea ===
Head coach: (North Korea) Yang Song-Guk

No.	Pos.	Player	Date of birth (age)	Caps	Goals	Club
1	GK	Kim Gang-il				(DPR Korea Football Association) 4.25 Cheyuk Dan
2	DF	Kim Jong-un				(DPR Korea Football Association) Rimsongsu Cheyuk Dan
5	DF	Cha Jong-sok	November 26, 1949 (aged 30)			(DPR Korea Football Association) Kingwancha SC
7	MF	An Chang-nam				(DPR Korea Football Association) 4.25 Cheyuk Dan
8	MF	Kim Bok-man				(DPR Korea Football Association) Sobaeksu SC
9	FW	Pak Jong-hun	March 10, 1948 (aged 32)			(DPR Korea Football Association) Amrokgang SC
10	FW	Kim Gwang-un				(DPR Korea Football Association) Wolmido SG
12	DF	Kang Tae-gwang				(DPR Korea Football Association) Sobaeksu SC
13	DF	Jon Byong-ju				(DPR Korea Football Association) Pyongyang SC
14	FW	Kim Gwan-mo				(DPR Korea Football Association) 8 de Agosto
15	MF	Hwang Sang-hoi				(DPR Korea Football Association) Kingwancha SC
16	MF	Kim Jong-man				(DPR Korea Football Association) Amrokgang SC
22	DF	Choi Jae-pil				(DPR Korea Football Association) Jadongcha Cheyuk Dan

=== Syria ===
Head coach: (Syria) Moussa Shammas

No.	Pos.	Player	Date of birth (age)	Caps	Goals	Club
	GK	Ahmad Eid Berakdar (c)	1 May 1955 (aged 25)			(Syrian Football Association) Al-Jaish SC
	MF	Alaa Amoud				(Syrian Football Association) Al-Jaish SC
	GK	Nafaa Abdul Kader				(Syrian Football Association) Al-Jaish SC
	DF	Issam Mahrous	7 April 1959 (aged 21)			(Syrian Football Association) Al-Jaish SC
	MF	Mohamed Jazaeri	18 February 1958 (aged 22)			(Syrian Football Association) Al-Jaish SC
	DF	Mohammed Dahman	1 January 1959 (aged 21)			(Syrian Football Association) Al-Jaish SC
	FW	Marwan Madarati	18 March 1959 (aged 21)			(Syrian Football Association) Al-Jaish SC
	MF	Jawdat Suleiman				(Syrian Football Association) Al Nawair SC
	MF	Kevork Mardikian	14 July 1954 (aged 26)			(Syrian Football Association) Al-Jaish SC
	FW	Elia Nabil Shana	2 March 1958 (aged 22)			(Syrian Football Association) Al-Jaish SC
	MF	Abdulfattah Hawa				(Syrian Football Association) Al-Jaish SC
	DF	Haytham Shehadeh				(Syrian Football Association) Al-Jaish SC
	MF	Jamal Keshek	1959 (aged 21)			(Syrian Football Association) Al-Jaish SC
	MF	Ahmad Darwish				(Syrian Football Association) Al-Jaish SC
	MF	Sadeq Al-Harsh				(Syrian Football Association) Jableh SC
	DF	Issam Zeno				(Syrian Football Association) Al-Jaish SC
	DF	Waleed Awad				(Syrian Football Association) Al-Jaish SC
	DF	Ibrahim Salama				(Syrian Football Association) Al-Jaish SC
	MF	Husam Hourani				(Syrian Football Association) Al-Jaish SC
	MF	Bashar Khalaf				(Syrian Football Association) Al-Jaish SC

== Group B ==
=== Kuwait ===
Head coach: (Brazil) Carlos Alberto Parreira

No.	Pos.	Player	Date of birth (age)	Caps	Goals	Club
1	GK	Abdulnabi Al-Khaldi				(Kuwait Football Association) Al-Arabi SC
2	DF	Naeem Saad	1 October 1957 (aged 22)			(Kuwait Football Association) Al Tadamun SC
3	DF	Mahboub Juma'a	17 September 1955 (aged 24)			(Kuwait Football Association) Al-Salmiya SC
4	DF	Jamal Al-Qabendi	7 April 1959 (aged 21)			(Kuwait Football Association) Kazma SC
5	DF	Waleed Al-Jasem	18 November 1959 (aged 20)			(Kuwait Football Association) Kuwait SC
6	MF	Saad Al-Houti (c)	24 May 1954 (aged 26)			(Kuwait Football Association) Kuwait SC
7	FW	Fathi Kameel	23 May 1955 (aged 25)			(Kuwait Football Association) Al Tadamun SC
8	MF	Mohammed Karam	1 January 1955 (aged 25)			(Kuwait Football Association) Al-Arabi SC
9	FW	Jasem Yaqoub	25 October 1953 (aged 26)			(Kuwait Football Association) Al-Qadsia SC
10	FW	Abdulaziz Al-Anberi	3 January 1954 (aged 26)			(Kuwait Football Association) Kuwait SC
11	MF	Nassir Al-Ghanim	4 April 1961 (aged 19)			(Kuwait Football Association) Kazma SC
12	FW	Yussef Al-Suwayed	20 September 1958 (aged 21)			(Kuwait Football Association) Kazma SC
14	DF	Hamoud Al-Shemmari	26 September 1960 (aged 19)			(Kuwait Football Association) Kazma SC
15	DF	Sami Al-Hashash	15 September 1959 (aged 21)			(Kuwait Football Association) Al-Arabi SC
16	FW	Faisal Al-Dakhil	13 August 1957 (aged 23)			(Kuwait Football Association) Al-Qadsia SC
18	MF	Ali Boudustor				(Kuwait Football Association) Al Shabab SC
21	GK	Adam Marjan	23 September 1957 (aged 22)			(Kuwait Football Association) Kazma SC
22	GK	Jasem Bahman	15 February 1958 (aged 22)			(Kuwait Football Association) Al-Qadsia SC

=== Malaysia ===
Head coach : (Malaysia) Mohamed Che Su

No.	Pos.	Player	Date of birth (age)	Caps	Goals	Club
1	GK	Ong Yu Tiang				(Football Association of Malaysia) Selangor FA
	GK	Peter Rajah	1 April 1951 (aged 29)			(Football Association of Malaysia) Sabah FA
	DF	Jamal Nasir	12 September 1954 (aged 26)			(Football Association of Malaysia) Pahang FA
	DF	Wan Jamak Wan Hassan	22 November 1957 (aged 22)			(Football Association of Malaysia) Johor FA
17	DF	D. Davendran				(Football Association of Malaysia) Pahang FA
	DF	Yahya Jusoh	15 May 1952 (aged 28)			(Football Association of Malaysia) Terengganu FA
	DF	Kamaruddin Abdullah				(Football Association of Malaysia) Selangor FA
16	DF	Nik Fauzi Hassan				(Football Association of Malaysia) Kelantan FA
3	DF	Soh Chin Aun	28 July 1950 (aged 30)			(Football Association of Malaysia) Selangor FA
	MF	Bakri Ibni	25 August 1952 (aged 28)			(Football Association of Malaysia) Perlis FA
	MF	Shukor Salleh	4 December 1948 (aged 31)			(Football Association of Malaysia) Penang FA
6	MF	S. Pusphanathan				(Football Association of Malaysia) Perak FA
2	MF	G. Torairaju	29 May 1956 (aged 24)			(Football Association of Malaysia) Negeri Sembilan FA
	MF	Abdah Alif	31 August 1954 (aged 26)			(Football Association of Malaysia) Pahang FA
14	FW	Ramli Junit				(Football Association of Malaysia) Malacca FA
	FW	Tukamin Bahari	1957			(Football Association of Malaysia) Johor FA
13	FW	Zulkifli Hamzah	17 May 1959 (aged 21)			(Football Association of Malaysia) Terengganu FA

=== Qatar ===
Head coach: (Brazil) Evaristo de Macedo

No.	Pos.	Player	Date of birth (age)	Caps	Goals	Club
	GK	Hussein Al Khawajah	16 September 1958 (aged 21)			(Qatar Football Association) Al Ahli SC
	DF	Adel Ahmed Malalla	15 September 1961 (aged 19)			(Qatar Football Association) Al Ahli SC
	MF	Khalid Salman	5 April 1962 (aged 18)			(Qatar Football Association) Al Sadd SC
	FW	Hassan Mattar	1 January 1956 (aged 24)			(Qatar Football Association) Al Sadd SC
	FW	Mansoor Muftah	22 November 1955 (aged 24)			(Qatar Football Association) Al Rayyan SC
		Majed Al Sayegh (c)				(Qatar Football Association) Al Arabi SC
		Anber Basheer				(Qatar Football Association) Qatar SC
		Saleh Khalfan				(Qatar Football Association) Al Arabi SC
		Abdelrrazaq Al Marikhi				
		Abdullah Saad				

=== South Korea ===
Head coach: Kim Jung-nam

No.	Pos.	Player	Date of birth (age)	Caps	Goals	Club
1	GK	Kim Hwang-ho	15 August 1954 (aged 26)			(Korea Football Association) Korea Automobile Insurance
2	DF	Kim Jong-pil	16 November 1956 (aged 23)			(Korea Football Association) Korea Electric Power
3	DF	Hong Sung-ho	20 November 1954 (aged 25)			(Korea Football Association) Chungeui
4	MF	Cho Kwang-rae	19 March 1954 (aged 26)			(Korea Football Association) Chungeui
5	DF	Kwon Oh-son	3 February 1959 (aged 21)			(Korea Football Association) Seoul City
6	MF	Park Sung-wha	7 May 1955 (aged 25)			(Korea Football Association) Chungeui
8	DF	Cho Young-jeung	18 August 1954 (aged 26)			(Korea Football Association) Korea First Bank
9	FW	Lee Young-moo	26 July 1953 (aged 27)			(Korea Football Association) Chungeui
10	MF	Shin Hyun-ho	21 September 1953 (aged 26)			(Korea Football Association) Chungeui
11	FW	Lee Jung-il	4 November 1956 (aged 23)			(Korea Football Association) Commercial Bank of Korea
12	DF	Choi Jong-duk	24 June 1954 (aged 26)			(Korea Football Association) Chungeui
13	DF	Chang Woe-ryong	5 April 1958 (aged 22)			(Korea Football Association) Yonsei University
14	FW	Lee Tae-yeop	16 June 1959 (aged 21)			(Korea Football Association) Seoul City
15	MF	Lee Kang-jo	27 October 1954 (aged 25)			(Korea Football Association) Korea University
16	FW	Chung Hae-won	1 July 1959 (aged 21)			(Korea Football Association) Yonsei University
18	FW	Hwang Seok-keun	3 September 1960 (aged 20)			(Korea Football Association) Korea University
19	DF	Yoon In-sun	1958			(Korea Football Association) Yonsei University
20	MF	Lee Tae-ho	26 April 1961 (aged 19)			(Korea Football Association) Korea University
21	GK	Cho Byung-deuk	26 May 1958 (aged 22)			(Korea Football Association) Myongji University
22	MF	Choi Soon-ho	10 January 1962 (aged 18)			(Korea Football Association) POSCO

=== United Arab Emirates ===
Head coach: (Iran) Heshmat Mohajerani

No.	Pos.	Player	Date of birth (age)	Caps	Goals	Club
1	GK	Saeed Salbukh				(United Arab Emirates Football Association) Al Shabab AC
	DF	Hassan Ali				(United Arab Emirates Football Association) Al Urooba
	DF	Yousuf Mohammed				(United Arab Emirates Football Association) Al Rams SCC
	MF	Bader Ahmed Saleh				(United Arab Emirates Football Association) Emirates Club
	DF	Abdulkarim Khammas				(United Arab Emirates Football Association) Al Asma FC
	FW	Jassim Mohammed				(United Arab Emirates Football Association) Al Wasl SC
	MF	Mohammed Salem Hamdoun				(United Arab Emirates Football Association) Al Ain FC
	DF	Salem Saeed				(United Arab Emirates Football Association) Al Wasl SC
	MF	Ahmed Chombi				(United Arab Emirates Football Association) Al Asma FC
	FW	Salim Khalifa				(United Arab Emirates Football Association) Al-Wahda FC
	DF	Salem Hadeed				(United Arab Emirates Football Association) Al Sharjah SC
	MF	Ghanem Al-Hajri				(United Arab Emirates Football Association) Al Urooba
