= Football at the 1982 Asian Games – Men's team squads =

Squads for the Football at the 1982 Asian Games played in New Delhi, India.

== Group A ==
=== North Korea ===
Head coach: (North Korea)

No.	Pos.	Player	Date of birth (age)	Caps	Goals	Club
	GK					
	DF					
	DF					
	MF	Jang Bong-yong				(DPR Korea Football Association)
	DF					
	MF	Hwang Sang-hoi				(DPR Korea Football Association) Kigwancha
	MF	Kim Jong-man				(DPR Korea Football Association) Amnokgang
	FW					
	FW	Han Hyong-il				(DPR Korea Football Association)
	FW	Kim Won-chol				
	FW					

=== Saudi Arabia ===
Head coach: (Brazil) Mario Zagalo

No.	Pos.	Player	Date of birth (age)	Caps	Goals	Club
1	GK	Khaled Al Dosary				
2	DF	Hussein Al-Bishi				
3	DF	Nawaf Khamis				
4	DF	Sameer Abdulshaker				
5	DF	Saleh Al-Nu'eimehh				
6	MF	Otman Marzoq				
7	MF	Saleh Khalifa Al-Dosari				
8	MF	Abdulrahman AlQahtani				
9	FW	Majed Abdullah				
10	MF	Fahad Al-Musaibeah				
11	FW	Adel Abdul-Raheem				
12	FW	Jamal Farhan				
13	MF	Ahmed Bayazid				
14	FW	Shaye Al-Nafisah				
15	FW	Amin Dabo				
16	DF	Hamed Subhi				
17	GK	Mohammed Al-Mutlaq				
18	GK	Abdullah Al-Deayea				

=== Syria ===
Head coach: (Syria)

No.	Pos.	Player	Date of birth (age)	Caps	Goals	Club
	GK					
	DF					
	DF					
	MF					
	DF					
	MF	Jamal Keshek				(Syrian Football Association) Al-Yarmouk
	FW					
	FW					
	FW					
	FW					
	FW					

=== Thailand ===
Head coach: (West Germany) Peter Schnittger

No.	Pos.	Player	Date of birth (age)	Caps	Goals	Club
	GK					
	DF					
	DF					
	MF					
	DF					
	MF					
	FW	Piyapong Pue-on				(Football Association of Thailand) Royal Thai Air Force
	FW	Boonnum Suksawat				(Football Association of Thailand) Bangkok Bank
	FW					
	FW					
	FW					

== Group B ==
=== Burma ===
Head coach: (Myanmar)

No.	Pos.	Player	Date of birth (age)	Caps	Goals	Club
	GK					
	DF					
	DF					
	MF					
	DF					
	MF					
	FW					
	FW					
	FW					
	FW					
	FW					

=== Iraq ===
Head coach: (Iraq) Ammo Baba

No.	Pos.	Player	Date of birth (age)	Club
1	GK	Raad Hammoudi(c)	1 May 1958 (aged 24)	(Iraq Football Association) Al-Shorta
22	GK	Sadiq Jaber	20 August 1960 (aged 22)	(Iraq Football Association) Al-Shabab
2	DF	Adnan Dirjal	26 January 1960 (aged 22)	(Iraq Football Association) Al-Talaba
3	DF	Karim Allawi	1 April 1960 (aged 22)	(Iraq Football Association) Al-Amana
4	DF	Khalil Allawi	6 September 1958 (aged 24)	(Iraq Football Association) Al-Tayaran
12	DF	Hassan Ali	1 January 1959 (aged 23)	(Iraq Football Association) Al-Jaish
13	DF	Wathiq Aswad	1 January 1957 (aged 25)	(Iraq Football Association) Al-Talaba
14	DF	Ayoub Odisho	15 December 1960 (aged 21)	(Iraq Football Association) Al-Talaba
5	MF	Natiq Hashim	15 January 1960 (aged 22)	(Iraq Football Association) Al-Jaish
6	MF	Ali Hussein Shihab	5 May 1961 (aged 21)	(Iraq Football Association) Al-Talaba
8	MF	Haris Mohammed	3 March 1958 (aged 24)	(Iraq Football Association) Al-Talaba
9	MF	Saad Jassim	14 August 1958 (aged 24)	(Iraq Football Association) Al-Jaish
15	MF	Osama Noori	17 May 1958 (aged 24)	(Iraq Football Association) Al-Tayaran
7	FW	Emad Jassim	17 August 1960 (aged 22)	(Iraq Football Association) Al-Tayaran
10	FW	Hussein Saeed	21 January 1958 (aged 24)	(Iraq Football Association) Al-Talaba
11	FW	Mahdi Abdul-Sahib	28 July 1956 (aged 26)	(Iraq Football Association) Al-Talaba
16	FW	Faisal Aziz	1 January 1957 (aged 25)	(Iraq Football Association) Al-Shorta
17	FW	Ahmed Radhi	21 April 1964 (aged 18)	(Iraq Football Association) Al-Zawraa

=== Kuwait ===
Head coach: (Kuwait)

No.	Pos.	Player	Date of birth (age)	Caps	Goals	Club
1	GK	Adam Marjan				
2	DF	Naeem Saad				
3	DF	Mahboub Juma'a				
4	DF	Jamal Al-Qabendi				
5	DF	Waleed Al-Jasem				
6	DF	Mubarak Marzouq				
7	FW	Fathi Kameel(c)				
8	MF	Abdullah Al-Buloushi				
9	MF	Hamad Abdulrazzaq				
10	FW	Abdulaziz Al-Anberi				
11	MF	Nasser Al-Ghanim				
12	FW	Yussef Al-Suwayed				
13	DF	Basil Abdul Nabi				
15	FW	Muayad Al-Haddad				
16	FW	Anbar Saeed				
17	MF	Hamoud Al-Shemmari				
18	MF	Mohammad Karam				
22	GK	Jasem Bahman				

=== Nepal ===
Head coach: (China) Zeng Shi Chui

No.	Pos.	Player	Date of birth (age)	Caps	Goals	Club
	GK	Ranjan Bista				
	DF	Dhirendra Pradhan				
	DF	Rupak Raj Sharma (c)				
	DF	Suresh Panthi				
	DF	Shree Ram Ranjeetkar				
	MF	Yam Bahadur Ghale				
	MF	Narendra Man Singh				
	MF	Man Bahadur Malla				
	MF	Bhaktaraj Karnikar				
	FW	Ganesh Thapa				
	FW	Dambar Singh Gurung				

== Group C ==
=== Bangladesh ===
Head coach: (Germany) Gerd Schmidt

No.	Pos.	Player	Date of birth (age)	Caps	Goals	Club
	GK	Abdul Motaleb (c)				(Bangladesh Football Federation) Abahani Krira Chakra
	GK	Mohamed Mohsin	1 August 1965 (aged 17)			(Bangladesh Football Federation) Mohammedan SC
	DF	Azmat Ali	15 March 1956 (aged 26)			(Bangladesh Football Federation) Brothers Union
	DF	Ezaharul Hoque Tipu				(Bangladesh Football Federation) Mohammedan SC
	DF	Sawpan Kumar Das	10 October 1958 (aged 24)			(Bangladesh Football Federation) Mohammedan SC
	DF	Abul Hossain	2 July 1957 (aged 25)			(Bangladesh Football Federation) Mohammedan SC
	DF	Mazidul Islam Moni				(Bangladesh Football Federation) Abahani Krira Chakra
	DF	Imtiaz Sultan Johnny	15 September 1961 (aged 21)			(Bangladesh Football Federation) Abahani Krira Chakra
	DF	Nazir Ahmed Alok	1 December 1960 (aged 21)			(Bangladesh Football Federation) Mohammedan SC
	MF	Ashish Bhadra	14 March 1960 (aged 22)			(Bangladesh Football Federation) Abahani Krira Chakra
	MF	Khurshid Alam Babul	1 March 1955 (aged 27)			(Bangladesh Football Federation) Abahani Krira Chakra
	MF	Badal Roy	4 July 1957 (aged 25)			(Bangladesh Football Federation) Mohammedan SC
	FW	Abdus Salam Murshedy	16 November 1963 (aged 19)			(Bangladesh Football Federation) Mohammedan SC
	FW	Khandoker Wasim Iqbal	21 November 1961 (aged 20)			(Bangladesh Football Federation) Brothers Union
	FW	Sheikh Mohammad Aslam	1 March 1958 (aged 24)			(Bangladesh Football Federation) Team BJMC
	FW	Kohinoor Rahman	11 March 1959 (aged 23)			(Bangladesh Football Federation) Mohammedan SC

=== China ===
Head coach: (China) Nian Weisi

No.	Pos.	Player	Date of birth (age)	Caps	Goals	Club
1	GK	Li Fusheng				
2		Liu Chengde				
3		Xie Zhixiong				
4		Lin Lefeng				
5	DF	Chi Shangbin				
6		Huang Xiangdong				
7	FW	Gu Guangming				
8	MF	Zuo Shusheng				
9		Chen Jingang				
10		Lü Hongxiang				
12		Zang Cailing				
13		Shen Xiangfu				
15		Chi Minghua				
16		Wang Feng				
22	GK	Xu Jianping				

=== India ===
Head coach: (India) P. K. Banerjee

No.	Pos.	Player	Date of birth (age)	Caps	Goals	Club
	GK	Bhaskar Ganguly				(All India Football Federation) East Bengal
	GK	Brahmanand Sankhwalkar	6 March 1954 (aged 28)			(All India Football Federation) Salgaocar
	DF	Compton Dutta				(All India Football Federation) Bengal
	DF	Monoranjan Bhattacharya				(All India Football Federation) East Bengal
	DF	Sudip Chatterjee	5 February 1959 (aged 23)			(All India Football Federation) Mohun Bagan
	DF	Aloke Mukherjee	1 May 1960 (aged 22)			(All India Football Federation) East Bengal
	DF	Gurcharan Singh Parmar				(All India Football Federation) Punjab
	DF	Aslam Khan				(All India Football Federation) Karnataka
	MF	Prasun Banerjee	6 April 1955 (aged 27)			(All India Football Federation) Bengal
	MF	Prasanta Banerjee	12 February 1958 (aged 24)			(All India Football Federation) Bengal
	MF	Mohammad Farid				(All India Football Federation) Bengal
	MF	Parminder Singh	5 May 1957 (aged 25)			(All India Football Federation) Punjab
	MF	Harjinder Singh				(All India Football Federation) JCT Mills
	FW	Bidesh Bose	15 November 1953 (aged 29)			(All India Football Federation) Bengal
	FW	Shabbir Ali	26 January 1956 (aged 26)			(All India Football Federation) Bengal
	FW	Biswajit Bhattacharya				(All India Football Federation) Bengal
	FW	Kartick Seth				(All India Football Federation) East Bengal
	FW	C. B. Thapa				(All India Football Federation) Services

=== Malaysia ===
Head coach: (Malaysia)

No.	Pos.	Player	Date of birth (age)	Caps	Goals	Club
	GK	Raja Ibni Baker				
	DF	Torairaju				
	DF	Baswanto				
	MF	Razhik Ahmad				
	FW	Isa Bakar				
	MF	Fardun Ibnat				
	FW	Razak Alfa				
	FW	Tong Cheng Lim				
	FW	Subraman Subramaniam				
	FW	Rehodot Singh				
	FW	Aazman Al Mohamed				

== Group D ==
=== Iran ===
Head coach: (Iran) Jalal Cheraghpour

No.	Pos.	Player	Date of birth (age)	Caps	Goals	Club
1	GK	Behrouz Soltani	31 December 1957 (aged 24)			(Football Federation Islamic Republic of Iran) Persepolis F.C.
2	DF	Mohammad Dadkan	2 February 1956 (aged 26)			(Football Federation Islamic Republic of Iran) Persepolis F.C.
3	DF	Mehdi Dinvarzadeh	12 March 1955 (aged 27)			(Football Federation Islamic Republic of Iran) Shahin Tehran F.C.
4		Amir Marzouqi				(Football Federation Islamic Republic of Iran) Shahin Tehran F.C.
5	DF	Mohammad Panjali	26 June 1955 (aged 27)			(Football Federation Islamic Republic of Iran) Persepolis F.C.
6	MF	Mohammad Mayeli Kohan	5 June 1953 (aged 29)			(Football Federation Islamic Republic of Iran) Persepolis F.C.
7	FW	Nasser Mohammadkhani	7 September 1957 (aged 25)			(Football Federation Islamic Republic of Iran) Persepolis F.C.
8	MF	Hamid Derakhshan	23 January 1959 (aged 23)			(Football Federation Islamic Republic of Iran) Persepolis F.C.
9	MF	Zia Arabshahi	6 June 1958 (aged 24)			(Football Federation Islamic Republic of Iran) Persepolis F.C.
12		Mohammad Naderi				(Football Federation Islamic Republic of Iran) Persepolis F.C.
14	FW	Abbas Kargar	21 March 1956 (aged 26)			(Football Federation Islamic Republic of Iran) Persepolis F.C.
15	MF	Reza Ahadi	30 November 1962 (aged 19)			(Football Federation Islamic Republic of Iran) Esteghlal F.C.
19		Amir Hossein Shahzeidi				(Football Federation Islamic Republic of Iran) Sepahan S.C.
	MF	Bijan Taheri	21 March 1961 (aged 21)			(Football Federation Islamic Republic of Iran) Esteghlal F.C.
	FW	Ali Firouzi	11 March 1955 (aged 27)			(Football Federation Islamic Republic of Iran) Sanat Naft F C

=== Japan ===
Head coach: (Japan) Takaji Mori

No.	Pos.	Player	Date of birth (age)	Caps	Goals	Club
1	GK	Mitsuhisa Taguchi				
6	DF	Takeshi Koshida				
4	DF	Tetsuo Sugamata				
5	DF	Hisashi Kato				
7	DF	Satoshi Tsunami				
12	MF	Koji Tanaka				
13	MF	Nobutoshi Kaneda				
9	MF	Takeshi Okada				
10	FW	Kazushi Kimura				
14	FW	Hiromi Hara				
8	MF	Yahiro Kazama				
	GK	Kazumi Tsubota				
	FW	Kazuo Ozaki				
	FW	Koichi Hashiratani				
	MF	Tetsuya Totsuka				
	MF	Akihiro Nishimura				
	FW	Hiroshi Yoshida				
	DF	Mitsugu Nomura				

=== South Korea ===
Head coach: (South Korea) Choi Eun-taek

No.	Pos.	Player	Date of birth (age)	Caps	Goals	Club
1	GK	Park Young-soo	18 January 1959 (aged 23)			(Korea Football Association) ROK Navy FC
2	DF	An Byung-dae	22 February 1959 (aged 23)			(Korea Football Association) POSCO FC
3	DF	Choi Kyung-shik	1 February 1957 (aged 25)			(Korea Football Association) Daewoo FC
4	DF	Cho Kwang-rae	19 March 1954 (aged 28)			(Korea Football Association) Daewoo FC
5	DF	Choi Ki-bong	13 November 1958 (aged 24)			(Korea Football Association) ROK Navy FC
6	DF	Park Sung-hwa	7 May 1955 (aged 27)			(Korea Football Association) Hallelujah FC
7	MF	Chung Jong-soo	27 March 1961 (aged 21)			(Korea Football Association) Korea University
8	DF	Park Kyung-hoon	19 January 1961 (aged 21)			(Korea Football Association) Korea University
9	FW	Choi Soon-ho	10 January 1962 (aged 20)			(Korea Football Association) POSCO FC
10	MF	Lee Heung-sil	10 July 1961 (aged 21)			(Korea Football Association) Hanyang University
11	FW	Byun Byung-joo	26 April 1961 (aged 21)			(Korea Football Association) Yonsei University
13	DF	Chang Woe-ryong	5 April 1959 (aged 23)			(Korea Football Association) Daewoo FC
14	FW	Kang Shin-woo	18 March 1959 (aged 23)			(Korea Football Association) Daewoo FC
15	MF	Lee Kang-jo	27 October 1954 (aged 28)			(Korea Football Association) Korea University
16	FW	Chung Hae-won	1 July 1959 (aged 23)			(Korea Football Association) Yonsei University
17	FW	Kim Seok-won	7 November 1960 (aged 22)			(Korea Football Association) Korea University
20	FW	Lee Tae-ho	29 January 1961 (aged 21)			(Korea Football Association) Korea University
21	GK	Chung Sung-kyo	30 May 1960 (aged 22)			(Korea Football Association) Yonsei University

=== South Yemen ===
Head coach: (South Yemen)

No.	Pos.	Player	Date of birth (age)	Caps	Goals	Club
20	GK	Mohammed Adel Ismail				
2		Hussein Bin-Saleh				
4		Abh Harrar				
6		Ibrahim Kokani Abbas				
12		Adel Saeed Mohammed				
14		Noorudin Madbul Ghani				
11		Gameel Saeed Saif				
8		Ahmed Mehdi Saeed				
9		Bin-Ali Nashan				
10		Abubakar Ibrahim Al-Mass	1 July 1955 (aged 27)			(PDR Yemen Football Federation) Al-Tilal
16		Hassan Nash Sami				
7		Mabrouk Mehdi Obaid				
