= Malaysia at the AFC Asian Cup =

The Malaysian team had participated in four editions of AFC Asian Cups in their history, the 1976, 1980, 2007 (where Malaysia co-hosted with Indonesia, Thailand and Vietnam) and the latest in 2023.

Malaysia first appearance in AFC Asian Cup were in the 1976 edition when they first qualified as Group 4 winner of the qualifying round. Malaysia again qualified for 1980 edition, however failed to qualify for the next 6 consecutive editions before being selected as host in 2007 together with Thailand, Indonesia and Vietnam. However, the 2007 AFC Asian Cup was Malaysia worst performance ever and, as a host nation in the AFC Asian Cup history. After the disastrous poor performance in 2007 AFC Asian Cup, Malaysia failed to qualify again for the 2011, 2015 and 2019 editions.

After 43 years since the 1980 AFC Asian Cup and for the first time since co-hosting the 2007 AFC Asian Cup, Malaysia finally returned and qualified on merit for the 2023 edition that were held in Qatar.

== Overall record ==
| [[AFC Asian Cup|AFC Asian Cup]] record | | | | | | | | | [[AFC Asian Cup qualifiers|Qualification]] record | | | | | | |
| Year | Round | Position | Pld | W | D* | L | GF | GA | Round | Pld | W | D | L | GF | GA |
|---|---|---|---|---|---|---|---|---|---|---|---|---|---|---|---|
| (Hong Kong) 1956 | See Malaya national football team ^{1} | | | | | | | | See Malaya national football team ^{1} | | | | | | |
| (South Korea) 1960 | See Malaya national football team ^{1} | | | | | | | | See Malaya national football team ^{1} | | | | | | |
| (Israel) 1964 | Did not qualify | | | | | | | | Group stage | 3 | 1 | 0 | 2 | 9 | 10 |
| (Iran) 1968 | Did not qualify | | | | | | | | Group stage | 4 | 1 | 1 | 2 | 4 | 5 |
| (Thailand) 1972 | Did not qualify | | | | | | | | Group stage | 5 | 4 | 0 | 1 | 15 | 3 |
| (Iran) 1976 | Group stage | 5th of 6 | 2 | 0 | 1 | 1 | 1 | 3 | Group stage ^{Q} | 4 | 3 | 1 | 0 | 6 | 1 |
| (Kuwait) 1980 | Group stage | 6th of 10 | 4 | 1 | 2 | 1 | 5 | 5 | Group stage ^{Q} | 5 | 2 | 2 | 1 | 8 | 4 |
| (Singapore) 1984 | Did not qualify | | | | | | | | Group stage | 4 | 2 | 1 | 1 | 10 | 3 |
| (Qatar) 1988 | Did not qualify | | | | | | | | Group stage | 4 | 1 | 1 | 2 | 4 | 6 |
| (Japan) 1992 | Did not qualify | | | | | | | | Group stage | 3 | 0 | 2 | 1 | 2 | 6 |
| (United Arab Emirates) 1996 | Did not qualify | | | | | | | | Group stage | 2 | 1 | 1 | 0 | 5 | 2 |
| (Lebanon) 2000 | Did not qualify | | | | | | | | Group stage | 6 | 2 | 1 | 3 | 12 | 13 |
| (China) 2004 | Did not qualify | | | | | | | | Group stage | 6 | 1 | 2 | 3 | 9 | 12 |
| (Indonesia) (Malaysia) (Thailand) (Vietnam) 2007 | Group stage | 16th of 16 | 3 | 0 | 0 | 3 | 1 | 12 | Qualified as co-hosts | | | | | | |
| (Qatar) 2011 | Did not qualify | | | | | | | | Group stage | 4 | 0 | 0 | 4 | 2 | 12 |
| (Australia) 2015 | Did not qualify | | | | | | | | Group stage | 6 | 2 | 1 | 3 | 5 | 7 |
| (United Arab Emirates) 2019 | Did not qualify | | | | | | | | Third round | 14 | 1 | 2 | 11 | 8 | 45 |
| (Qatar) 2023 | Group stage | 21st of 24 | 3 | 0 | 1 | 2 | 3 | 8 | Third round | 13 | 8 | 0 | 5 | 30 | 18 |
| (Saudi Arabia) 2027 | To be determined | | | | | | | | To be determined | | | | | | |
| Total | Appearances: 4 | Best: 5th | 12 | 1 | 4 | 7 | 10 | 28 | Best: Third round | 82 | 29 | 15 | 38 | 129 | 147 |

== Iran 1976 ==
=== Group A ===
| Pos | Team | Pld | W | D | L | GF | GA | GD | Pts | Qualification |
|---|---|---|---|---|---|---|---|---|---|---|
| 1 | Kuwait | 2 | 2 | 0 | 0 | 3 | 0 | +3 | 4 | Advance to Knockout stage |
| 2 | China | 2 | 0 | 1 | 1 | 1 | 2 | −1 | 1 | Advance to Knockout stage |
| 3 | Malaysia | 2 | 0 | 1 | 1 | 1 | 3 | −2 | 1 | |

Source: RSSSF
3 June 1976

| Kuwait | 2–0 | Malaysia |
|---|---|---|
| Al-Anberi 10'; Al-Dakhil 42' |

Reza Pahlavi Stadium, Tabriz

5 June 1976

| China | 1–1 | Malaysia |
|---|---|---|
| Wang Jilian 58' | | Mokhtar Dahari 50' |

Reza Pahlavi Stadium, Tabriz

Malaysia's inaugural performance at the 1976 Asian Cup is still considered a hard pill to swallow as the Chinese advanced to the last four via on goal difference.

== Kuwait 1980 ==
=== Group B ===
| Pos | Team | Pld | W | D | L | GF | GA | GD | Pts | Qualification |
|---|---|---|---|---|---|---|---|---|---|---|
| 1 | South Korea | 4 | 3 | 1 | 0 | 10 | 2 | +8 | 7 | Advance to Knockout stage |
| 2 | Kuwait (H) | 4 | 2 | 1 | 1 | 8 | 5 | +3 | 5 | Advance to Knockout stage |
| 3 | Malaysia | 4 | 1 | 2 | 1 | 5 | 5 | 0 | 4 | |
| 4 | Qatar | 4 | 1 | 1 | 2 | 3 | 8 | −5 | 3 | |
| 5 | United Arab Emirates | 4 | 0 | 1 | 3 | 3 | 9 | −6 | 1 | |

Source: RSSSF
(H) Hosts
16 September 1980
18:30

| South Korea | 1–1 | Malaysia |
|---|---|---|
| Choi Soon-ho 69' | | Zulkifli 90' |

Sabah Al-Salem Stadium, Kuwait City
Attendance: 5,000
Referee: Sudarso Hardjowasito (Indonesia)

18 September 1980

| Kuwait | 3–1 | Malaysia |
|---|---|---|
| Kameel 20'; Yaqoub 53' (pen.), 77' (pen.) | | Zulkifli 44' |

Sabah Al-Salem Stadium, Kuwait City
Attendance: 20,000

20 September 1980

| Malaysia | 2–0 | United Arab Emirates |
|---|---|---|
| Abdah 32'; Tukamin 89' |

Sabah Al-Salem Stadium, Kuwait City

23 September 1980

| Malaysia | 1–1 | Qatar |
|---|---|---|
| Tukamin |

Sabah Al-Salem Stadium, Kuwait City

Malaysia's performance at 1980 Asian Cup is still considered today as the finest performance ever of Malaysia despite not advancing to Knockout stage when Soh Chin Ann named into the Team of the Tournament by the AFC, the first Southeast Asian player to receive such honour, a record which would stand until the 2019 AFC Asian Cup. since then, Malaysia did not qualify for the Asian Cup until 2007.

== Indonesia/Malaysia/Thailand/Vietnam 2007 ==
=== Group C ===
| Pos | Team | Pld | W | D | L | GF | GA | GD | Pts | Qualification |
|---|---|---|---|---|---|---|---|---|---|---|
| 1 | Iran | 3 | 2 | 1 | 0 | 6 | 3 | +3 | 7 | Advance to Knockout stage |
| 2 | Uzbekistan | 3 | 2 | 0 | 1 | 9 | 2 | +7 | 6 | Advance to Knockout stage |
| 3 | China | 3 | 1 | 1 | 1 | 7 | 6 | +1 | 4 | |
| 4 | Malaysia (H) | 3 | 0 | 0 | 3 | 1 | 12 | −11 | 0 | |

Rules for classification: Tiebreakers
(H) Hosts

All times are UTC+8.

10 July 2007
20:30 UTC+8

| Malaysia | 1–5 | China |
|---|---|---|
| Indra Putra 74' | Report | Han Peng 15', 55'; Shao Jiayi 36'; Wang Dong 51', 90+3' |

Bukit Jalil Stadium, Kuala Lumpur
Attendance: 21,155
Referee: Muhsen Basma (Syria)

14 July 2007
18:15 UTC+8

| Uzbekistan | 5–0 | Malaysia |
|---|---|---|
| Shatskikh 10', 89'; Kapadze 30'; Bakayev 45+2' (pen.); Ibrahimov 85' | Report |

Bukit Jalil Stadium, Kuala Lumpur
Attendance: 7,137
Referee: Abdulrahman Abdou (Qatar)

18 July 2007
20:30 UTC+8

| Malaysia | 0–2 | Iran |
|---|---|---|
| | Report | Nekounam 29' (pen.); Teymourian 77' |

Bukit Jalil Stadium, Kuala Lumpur
Attendance: 4,520
Referee: Muhsen Basma (Syria)

Malaysia's performance in 2007 Asian Cup is still remembered as the worst performance ever for a host nation in the Asian Cup when the team did not manage to collect any single point with conceded the most goals. After the tournament, criticisms run high with the defeat of the Malay Tigers, even in the foreign press.

== Qatar 2023 ==
=== Group E ===
| Pos | Team | Pld | W | D | L | GF | GA | GD | Pts | Qualification |
|---|---|---|---|---|---|---|---|---|---|---|
| 1 | Bahrain | 3 | 2 | 0 | 1 | 3 | 3 | 0 | 6 | Advance to knockout stage |
| 2 | South Korea | 3 | 1 | 2 | 0 | 8 | 6 | +2 | 5 | Advance to knockout stage |
| 3 | Jordan | 3 | 1 | 1 | 1 | 6 | 3 | +3 | 4 | Advance to knockout stage |
| 4 | Malaysia | 3 | 0 | 1 | 2 | 3 | 8 | −5 | 1 | |

Source: AFC
15 January 2024
20:30

| Malaysia | 0–4 | Jordan |
|---|---|---|
| | Report | Al-Mardi 12', 32'; Al-Taamari 18' (pen.), 85' |

Al Janoub Stadium, Al Wakrah
Attendance: 20,410
Referee: Mohammed Abdulla Hassan Mohamed (United Arab Emirates)

20 January 2024
17:30

| Bahrain | 1–0 | Malaysia |
|---|---|---|
| Madan 90+5' | Report |

Jassim bin Hamad Stadium, Al Rayyan
Attendance: 10,386
Referee: Ahmed Al-Kaf (Oman)

25 January 2024
14:30

| South Korea | 3–3 | Malaysia |
|---|---|---|
| Jeong Woo-yeong 21'; Lee Kang-in 83'; Son Heung-min 90+4' (pen.) | Report | Faisal 51'; Arif 62' (pen.); Morales 90+15' |

Al Janoub Stadium, Al Wakrah
Attendance: 30,117
Referee: Khalid Al-Turais (Saudi Arabia)

Malaysia's performance in 2023 Asian Cup is currently remembered as the better performance than previous 2007 Asian Cup edition when the team managed to collect one point through the monumental 3−3 drawn against the powerhouse South Korea and Faisal Halim first goal has been picked by fans as the 2023 Asian Cup best goal.

== Goalscorers ==
| Player | Goals | 1976 | 1980 | 2007 | 2023 |
|---|---|---|---|---|---|
| Tukamin Bahari | 2 | | 2 | | |
| Zulkifli Hamzah | 2 | | 2 | | |
| Mokhtar Dahari | 1 | 1 | | | |
| Abdah Alif | 1 | | 1 | | |
| Indra Putra Mahayuddin | 1 | | | 1 | |
| Arif Aiman | 1 | | | | 1 |
| Faisal Halim | 1 | | | | 1 |
| Romel Morales | 1 | | | | 1 |
| Total | 10 | 1 | 5 | 1 | 3 |
