= Football at the 1982 Asian Games =

- Date: 20 November – 3 December
- Nations: 16

Medalists
gold medal	Iraq
silver medal	Kuwait
bronze medal	Saudi Arabia

Football was contested as part of the programme for the 1982 Asian Games which was hosted in New Delhi, India from 19 November to 4 December 1982. It was the ninth edition of the men's football tournament at the multi-sport event organised by the Olympic Council of Asia.

The football tournament began with the first matches of the group stage on 20 November 1982 and ended with the gold medal match on 3 December 1982. Iraq and Kuwait contested the final. Hussein Saeed scored the only goal of the match as Iraq defeated Kuwait to win the gold medal. The bronze medal match was not played after North Korea were suspended by the Asian Football Confederation (AFC) for an attack on referee Vijit Getkaew during their semi-final. Instead, the bronze medal was awarded to Saudi Arabia.

== Background ==
Football had been part of the Asian Games programme following the debut of the men's competition at the inaugural 1951 Asian Games in India.

Burma, India, South Korea and Taiwan held the record for gold medals having each won the football tournament twice. However, South Korea had never before won the gold medal outright having twice shared the title. North Korea and South Korea were both defending champions after sharing the gold medal following a goalless draw after extra time in the final at the 1978 Asian Games in Thailand.

== Format ==
Originally, 18 teams were set to take part in the competition. They were drawn into four single round robin groups – two of four teams and two of five teams. After two teams withdrew this was changed to four single round robin groups of four teams. The group winners and runners-up would then contest the quarter-finals. The winners of the quarter-finals would contest the semi-finals which would decide which teams contested the gold and bronze medal matches.

=== Participants ===
- Bangladesh
- Burma
- China
- India
- Iran
- Iraq
- Japan
- Kuwait
- Malaysia
- Nepal
- North Korea
- ~~North Yemen~~
- ~~Oman~~
- Saudi Arabia
- South Korea
- South Yemen
- Syria
- Thailand

== Draw ==
The draw for the group stage was held on 6 November 1982. After Oman and North Yemen withdrew, South Yemen were moved to Group D to balance the number of teams in each group.

Group A

- North Korea
- Saudi Arabia
- Thailand
- Syria
- ~~North Yemen~~

Group B

- Iraq
- Kuwait
- Nepal
- Burma
- South Yemen

Group C

- India
- China
- Malaysia
- Bangladesh

Group D

- South Korea
- Iran
- Japan
- ~~Oman~~

== Group stage ==
=== Group A ===
North Korea and Saudi Arabia advanced to the quarter-finals.

==== Table ====
Pos	Team	Pld	W	D	L	GF	GA	GD	Pts	Qualification
1	North Korea	3	1	2	0	6	3	+3	4	Qualification for the quarter-finals
2	Saudi Arabia	3	1	2	0	4	3	+1	4	Qualification for the quarter-finals
3	Syria	3	0	2	1	3	5	−2	2	
4	Thailand	3	1	0	2	3	5	−2	2	

==== Matches ====
20 November 1982

North Korea	1–1	Syria
Jang Bong-yong 21'		Khalil 86'

Ambedkar Stadium, New Delhi
20 November 1982

Saudi Arabia	1–0	Thailand
Al-Qahtani 42'

Ambedkar Stadium, New Delhi

22 November 1982

North Korea	3–0	Thailand
Han Hyong-il 28', 56', 62'

Jawaharlal Nehru Stadium, New Delhi
22 November 1982

Saudi Arabia	1–1	Syria
Al-Qahtani 54'		Madarati 16'

Chhatrasal Stadium, New Delhi

24 November 1982

North Korea	2–2	Saudi Arabia
Kim Jong-man 33'; Hwang Sang-hoi 40'		Bayazid 11'; Abdulshaker 13'

Chhatrasal Stadium, New Delhi
24 November 1982

Thailand	3–1	Syria
Boonnum 8', 23'; Piyapong 60'		Keshek 30'

Jawaharlal Nehru Stadium, New Delhi

=== Group B ===
Kuwait and Iraq advanced to the quarter-finals.

==== Table ====
Pos	Team	Pld	W	D	L	GF	GA	GD	Pts	Qualification
1	Kuwait	3	3	0	0	9	2	+7	6	Qualification for the quarter-finals
2	Iraq	3	2	0	1	8	2	+6	4	Qualification for the quarter-finals
3	Burma	3	1	0	2	3	8	−5	2	
4	Nepal	3	0	0	3	1	9	−8	0	

==== Matches ====
21 November 1982

Kuwait	3–1	Nepal
Al-Suwayed; Abdull. Al-Buloushi; Saeed		Ghale

21 November 1982

Iraq	4–0	Burma
Hashim 10'; Saeed 32'; Shihab 54'; Mohammed 86'

23 November 1982

Kuwait	4–0	Burma
Al-Ghanim 30'; Al-Anberi 44'; Al-Suwayed 81'; Al-Haddad 86'

23 November 1982

Iraq	3–0	Nepal
Odisho 3'; Saeed 56', 75'

25 November 1982

Iraq	1–2	Kuwait
Shihab 73'		Al-Suwayed 35'; Al-Anberi 37'

25 November 1982

Burma	3–0	Nepal
Tin Hlaing 41'; Aye Maung 80'; Maung Win 81'

=== Group C ===
India and China advanced to the quarter-finals.

==== Table ====
Pos	Team	Pld	W	D	L	GF	GA	GD	Pts	Qualification
1	India	3	2	1	0	5	2	+3	5	Qualification for the quarter-finals
2	China	3	2	1	0	4	2	+2	5	Qualification for the quarter-finals
3	Bangladesh	3	1	0	2	2	4	−2	2	
4	Malaysia	3	0	0	3	1	4	−3	0	

==== Matches ====
20 November 1982

China	1–0	Malaysia
Liu Chengde 23'

Chhatrasal Stadium, New Delhi
20 November 1982

India	2–0	Bangladesh
Prasun Banerjee 1', 90+5'

Jawaharlal Nehru Stadium, New Delhi

22 November 1982

India	1–0	Malaysia
Kartick Sett 68'

Ambedkar Stadium, New Delhi
22 November 1982

China	1–0	Bangladesh
Huang Xiangdong 22'

Jawaharlal Nehru Stadium, New Delhi

24 November 1982

India	2–2	China
Shabbir Ali 53'; Kartick Seth 60'		Shen Xiangfu 25'; Zuo Shusheng 82'

Ambedkar Stadium, New Delhi
24 November 1982

Malaysia	1–2	Bangladesh
Ahmad Yusof 81'		Ashish Bhadra 17'; Badal Roy 75'

=== Group D ===
Japan and Iran advanced to the quarter-finals.

==== Table ====
Pos	Team	Pld	W	D	L	GF	GA	GD	Pts	Qualification
1	Japan	3	3	0	0	6	2	+4	6	Qualification for the quarter-finals
2	Iran	3	2	0	1	3	1	+2	4	Qualification for the quarter-finals
3	South Korea	3	1	0	2	4	3	+1	2	
4	South Yemen	3	0	0	3	1	8	−7	0	

==== Matches ====
21 November 1982

Japan	1–0	Iran
Kimura 79'

Chhatrasal Stadium, New Delhi
21 November 1982

South Korea	3–0	South Yemen
Chung Hae-won 25'; Choi Soon-ho 75', 80'

Ambedkar Stadium, New Delhi

23 November 1982

South Korea	0–1	Iran
		Derakhshan 47'

Jawaharlal Nehru Stadium, New Delhi
23 November 1982

Japan	3–1	South Yemen
Hara 66', 79'; Totsuka 84'		Ahmed 50'

Jawaharlal Nehru Stadium, New Delhi

25 November 1982

South Korea	1–2	Japan
Kang Shin-woo 21'		Kimura 58'; Kaneda 79'

Chhatrasal Stadium, New Delhi
25 November 1982

Iran	2–0	South Yemen
Mohammadkhani 47'; Firouzi 67'

Ambedkar Stadium, New Delhi

== Knockout stage ==
=== Quarter-finals ===
North Korea, Saudi Arabia, Iraq and Kuwait advanced to the semi-finals.

27 November 1982

North Korea	1–0	China
Kim Jong-man 58'

Jawaharlal Nehru Stadium, New Delhi

27 November 1982

India	0–1	Saudi Arabia
		Bayazid 89'

Jawaharlal Nehru Stadium, New Delhi

28 November 1982

Japan	0–1 (a.e.t.)	Iraq
		E. Jassim 102'

Jawaharlal Nehru Stadium, New Delhi

28 November 1982

Kuwait	1–0 (a.e.t.)	Iran
Al-Haddad 97'

Jawaharlal Nehru Stadium, New Delhi

=== Semi-finals ===
The semi-finals were marred by controversy. After Kuwait defeated North Korea 3–2 after extra time, North Korean players, officials and competitors from other sports attacked referee Vijit Getkaew. Police and some Thai athletes entered the field of play to intervene and protect Vijit. It later emerged that several North Korean players had attempted to bribe Vijit and his assistant referees ahead of the match.

In the other match, Iraq defeated Saudi Arabia to advance to the gold medal match.

30 November 1982

North Korea	2–3 (a.e.t.)	Kuwait
Kim Jong-man 76'; Kim Won-chol 112'		Juma'a 82' (pen.); Al-Haddad 102'; Al-Anberi 104'

Jawaharlal Nehru Stadium, New Delhi
Referee: Vijit Getkaew (Thailand)

1 December 1982

Saudi Arabia	0–1	Iraq
		Mohammed 17'

Jawaharlal Nehru Stadium, New Delhi

== Bronze medal match ==
Following the attack on referee Vijit Getkaew, the DPR Korea Football Association was suspended by the Asian Football Confederation (AFC) for two years. As a result, the bronze medal match was not played and the medal was awarded to Saudi Arabia.

2 December 1982

North Korea	Not played	Saudi Arabia

Jawaharlal Nehru Stadium, New Delhi

== Gold medal match ==
Hussein Saeed scored the only goal of the match as Iraq defeated Kuwait to win the gold medal.

3 December 1982

Kuwait	0–1	Iraq
		Saeed 82'

Jawaharlal Nehru Stadium, New Delhi
