= Pintu =

Pintu may refer to:

== People ==
- Wahiduzzaman Khan Pintu (born 1957), Bangladeshi footballer
- Iftiquar Uddin Talukder Pintu (born 1964), Bangladeshi politician
- Nasiruddin Ahmed Pintu (1967–2015), Bangladeshi politician
- Abdus Salam Pintu, former Deputy Minister of Education in Bangladesh

== Places ==
- Pintu Hidayah, Indonesian Islamic religious soap opera
- Kampong Pintu Malim, village in Brunei
- Kampung Pintu Padang, village in Malaysia

== See also ==
- Bablu
- Tipu
