= Gai Yang =

Chinese association football player

Personal information
- Date of birth: 2 January 1987 (age 39)
- Place of birth: Shenyang, Liaoning, China
- Height: 1.82 m (6 ft 0 in)
- Position: Midfielder

Youth career
- Years: Team
- 2004–2007: Marseille

Gai Yang (Chinese: 盖阳; born 2 January 1987) is a Chinese former footballer.

== Club career ==
Born in Shenyang, Liaoning, Gai moved to Dalian with his father when he was young. Though he reportedly played for Dalian Shide, Gai himself stated that he merely trained with a number of clubs in China, and was a free agent.

Gai first went on a six-month trial with French club Marseille in January 2004. Having impressed on trial, club owner Robert Louis-Dreyfus personally travelled to Beijing to sign the two-year contract to bring him to Marseille.

In preparation for the 2008 Summer Olympics in Beijing, the China Olympic team arranged a friendly against Marseille. Gai featured for Marseille in this friendly for a mere 15 minutes, which he later stated was regrettable, as he had hoped to be included in the final squad.

In 2007, with Gai's contract with Marseille set to be terminated, he returned to China. On his return, he was unable to find a professional club to sign with, and eventually resorted to playing amateur football while studying football coaching.

== Coaching career ==
In December 2007, Gai obtained student status at the Tongji University, where he would go on to study economics and management. While at the university, he played for their football team. He would go on to the Beijing Sport University to study for his master's degree.

He worked as a coach at Ai Football Club and the Beijing UBest Football Club, both youth football academies.

== Personal life ==
Yang is the son of former Chinese international footballer Gai Zengchen. His uncles, Gai Zengsheng, Gai Zengxian and Gai Zengjun were all also professional footballers.
