= 1992 AFC Asian Cup qualification =

Tournament details
- Dates: 19 April 1992 – 23 June 1992
- Teams: 20 (from 1 confederation)

The Japan (hosts) and Saudi Arabia (holders) qualified automatically for the 1992 AFC Asian Cup. Six other teams had to qualify for the event, scheduled from 29 October to 8 November. There were a total number of 20 participating teams in the qualifying tournament.

== Qualification ==
=== Group 1 ===
All matches in Doha, Qatar

Team	Pts	Pld	W	D	L	GF	GA	GD
Qatar	4	2	2	0	0	8	2	+6
Syria	2	2	1	0	1	3	4	−1
Oman	0	2	0	0	2	0	5	−5

29 May 1992

Qatar	4–2	Syria
Soufi 33'; Khamis 55', 65'; Al Mulla 72'	Report	Ramadan 56', 80'

Khalifa International Stadium, Doha
Attendance: 15,000
Referee: Ali Bujsaim (United Arab Emirates)

31 May 1992

Qatar	4–0	Oman
Soufi 46'; Khamis 60'; Mustafa 65', 90'	Report

Jassim bin Hamad Stadium, Al Rayyan
Attendance: 11,500
Referee: Talal Saleh (Lebanon)

2 June 1992

Syria	1–0	Oman
Mahrous 81'	Report

Khalifa International Stadium, Doha
Attendance: 500
Referee: Ishak Abu Ali (Jordan)

=== Group 2 ===
All matches in Al Ain, UAE

Team	Pts	Pld	W	D	L	GF	GA	GD
United Arab Emirates	4	2	2	0	0	6	3	+3
Kuwait	2	2	1	0	1	4	3	+1
Bahrain	0	2	0	0	2	1	5	−4

24 May 1992

Kuwait	2–0	Bahrain
Marwi 26'; Al-Saleh 79'	Report

Khalifa bin Zayed Stadium, Al Ain
Attendance: 10,000
Referee: Omar Al Mehannah (Saudi Arabia)

27 May 1992

United Arab Emirates	3–2	Kuwait
Mubarak 14'; Hussain 20' (pen.); Bakheet 90+2'	Report	Al-Saleh 65', 75'

Khalifa bin Zayed Stadium, Al Ain
Attendance: 20,000
Referee: Jamal Al Sharif (Syria)

30 May 1992

United Arab Emirates	3–1	Bahrain
Bakheet 1'; Mubarak 15'; Al Talyani 25'	Report	Issa 76'

Khalifa bin Zayed Stadium, Al Ain
Referee: Hossein Asgari (Iran)

=== Group 3 ===
All matches in Kolkata, India
Nepal and Maldives withdrew

Team	Pts	Pld	W	D	L	GF	GA	GD
Iran	4	2	2	0	0	10	0	+10
India	2	2	1	0	1	2	3	−1
Pakistan	0	2	0	0	2	0	9	−9

9 May 1992

India	2–0	Pakistan
Vijayan 3', 81'	Report

Salt Lake Stadium, Kolkata
Attendance: 1,000
Referee: Choochai Buaboocha (Thailand)

11 May 1992

Pakistan	0–7	Iran
	Report	Pious 3'; Tariq 13' (o.g.); Marfavi 18', 82'; Ghayeghran 27'; Hassanzadeh 35'; Abtahi 44'

Salt Lake Stadium, Kolkata
Attendance: 1,000
Referee: Shyam Shrestha (Nepal)

15 May 1992

India	0–3	Iran
	Report	Moharrami 35'; Pious 39', 64'

Salt Lake Stadium, Kolkata
Attendance: 20,000
Referee: Mohd Nazri Abdullah (Malaysia)

=== Group 4 ===
All matches in Pyongyang, Korea DPR

Team	Pts	Pld	W	D	L	GF	GA	GD
North Korea	5	3	2	1	0	8	0	+8
Macau	3	3	1	1	1	4	4	0
Hong Kong	3	3	0	3	0	2	2	0
Chinese Taipei	1	3	0	1	2	0	8	−8

3 June 1992

Hong Kong	2–2	Macau
	Report

3 June 1992

North Korea	6–0	Chinese Taipei
	Report

5 June 1992

North Korea	2–0	Macau
	Report

5 June 1992

Chinese Taipei	0–0	Hong Kong
	Report

7 June 1992

Chinese Taipei	0–2	Macau
	Report

7 June 1992

North Korea	0–0	Hong Kong
	Report

=== Group 5 ===
All matches in Singapore

Team	Pts	Pld	W	D	L	GF	GA	GD
China	6	3	3	0	0	7	0	+7
Indonesia	3	3	1	1	1	3	4	−1
Malaysia	2	3	0	2	1	2	6	−4
Singapore	1	3	0	1	2	2	4	−2

19 April 1992

Singapore	1–1	Malaysia
T. Pathmanathan 80'	Report	Lim Tong Hai 76' (o.g.)

Singapore National Stadium
Attendance: 55.000
Referee: Ahmad Hakeem (UAE)

20 April 1992

Indonesia	0–2	China
	Report	Wu Qunli 24'; Mai Chao 25'

Singapore National Stadium
Attendance: 15.000
Referee: U Tin Aung (Myanmar)

22 April 1992

Singapore	1–2	Indonesia
Razali Saad 24'	Report	Fachri Husaini 8'; Singgih Pitono 85'

Singapore National Stadium
Attendance: 32.000
Referee: Moritsu Yotaru (Japan)

23 April 1992

China	4–0	Malaysia
Wu Qunli 7'; Guo Yijun 40'; Peng Weiguo 52'; Gao Hongbo 85'	Report

Singapore National Stadium
Attendance: 7.000
Referee: U Tin Aung (Myanmar)

24 April 1992

Malaysia	1–1	Indonesia
Zainal Abidin Hassan 44'	Report	Fachri Husaini 56'

Singapore National Stadium
Attendance: 4.000
Referee: Tung Ping Yim (Hongkong)

26 April 1992

Singapore	0–1	China
	Report	Xie Yuxin 28'

Singapore National Stadium
Attendance: 14.000
Referee: Muhammad Al-Majid (Bahrain)

=== Group 6 ===
All matches in Bangkok, Thailand

Team	Pts	Pld	W	D	L	GF	GA	GD
Thailand	4	2	2	0	0	3	1	+2
South Korea	2	2	1	0	1	7	2	+5
Bangladesh	0	2	0	0	2	0	7	−7

19 June 1992

South Korea	6–0	Bangladesh
Cha Seung-ryong 11', 32'; Lee Hyan-chul 31'; Roh Sang-rae 43'; Park Chul 72'; Woo Hong-kyun 90'	Report

Suphachalasai Stadium, Bangkok
Referee: Wan A. Rashid (Malaysia)

21 June 1992

Thailand	2–1	South Korea
Buspakom 3' (pen.); Changmool 84'	Report	Roh Sang-rae 20'

Suphachalasai Stadium, Bangkok
Referee: Chen Shengcai (China)

23 June 1992

Thailand	1–0	Bangladesh
Changmool 88'	Report

Suphachalasai Stadium, Bangkok
Referee: Sagar K. Sen (India)

== Qualified teams ==
Team	Qualified as	Qualified on	Previous appearance
Japan	Hosts	N/A	1 (1988)
Saudi Arabia	1988 AFC Asian Cup champions	18 December 1988	2 (1984, 1988)
Qatar	Group 1 winners	31 May 1992	3 (1980, 1984, 1988)
United Arab Emirates	Group 2 winners	30 May 1992	3 (1980, 1984, 1988)
Iran	Group 3 winners	15 May 1992	6 (1968, 1972, 1976, 1980, 1984, 1988)
North Korea	Group 4 winners	7 June 1992	1 (1980)
China	Group 5 winners	26 April 1992	4 (1976, 1980, 1984, 1988)
Thailand	Group 6 winners	23 June 1992	1 (1972)
