= 1982 FIFA World Cup qualification (AFC and OFC) =

Tournament details
- Teams: 20 (from 2 confederations)

Tournament statistics
- Top scorer(s): (Australia) Gary Cole (New Zealand) Steve Sumner (New Zealand) Brian Turner (9 goals)

The Asian and Oceanian (AFC and OFC) qualification rounds for the 1982 FIFA World Cup took place between 21 December 1980 and 10 January 1982. In total, 20 teams – 17 from Asia and three from Oceania – entered the competition for two places at the finals in Spain.

Following two rounds of qualifying, Kuwait qualified for the FIFA World Cup for the first time after finishing first in the final round. New Zealand also qualified for the first time after defeating China in a play-off.

== Background ==
Teams from Asia first took part in qualification for the FIFA World Cup in 1934 when Mandatory Palestine entered. In 1938, the Dutch East Indies became the first team from Asia to qualify after their opponents Japan and the United States both withdrew. Asian teams had limited experience at the World Cup after only the Dutch East Indies in 1938, India in 1950, (Note: India qualified without playing a match but withdrew from the 1950 FIFA World Cup.) South Korea in 1954, North Korea in 1966, Israel in 1970 and Iran in 1978 had qualified for the finals.

Australia became the first team from Oceania to enter qualification for the FIFA World Cup in 1966. They became the first team, and only team before 1982, from Oceania to qualify for the FIFA World Cup after defeating South Korea in the final round of qualification for the 1974 FIFA World Cup.

== Format ==
Originally, 21 teams were due to compete but Iran withdrew before the draw.

In the first round, the 20 teams were drawn into four groups of varying sizes and rules. Group 1 was a double round robin group of five teams. Group 2 was a single round robin group of five teams and Group 3 was a single round robin group of four teams. The winner of Groups 1, 2 and 3 would advance to the final round.

Group 4 contained six teams and was played over four rounds. Each team played a preliminary match to decide which group they would enter in the first round. The teams then contested two single round robin groups of three teams. The group winners and runners-up would contest a semi-final and final round to determine the winner of Group 4 and advance to the final round.

The final round was played as a double round robin. The winner and runner-up would qualify for the finals.

=== Participants ===
Asia

- Bahrain
- China
- Chinese Taipei
- Hong Kong
- Indonesia
- Iraq
- Japan
- Kuwait
- Macau
- Malaysia
- North Korea
- Qatar
- Saudi Arabia
- Singapore
- South Korea
- Syria
- Thailand

Oceania

- Australia
- Fiji
- New Zealand

== First round ==
=== Group 1 ===
New Zealand advanced to the final round.

==== Table ====
Pos	Team	Pld	W	D	L	GF	GA	GD	Pts	Qualification	New Zealand	Australia	Indonesia	Chinese Taipei for Olympic games	Fiji
1	New Zealand	8	6	2	0	31	3	+28	14	Advance to the final round	—	3–3	5–0	2–0	13–0
2	Australia	8	4	2	2	22	9	+13	10		0–2	—	2–0	3–2	10–0
3	Indonesia	8	2	2	4	5	14	−9	6		0–2	1–0	—	1–0	3–3
4	Chinese Taipei	8	1	3	4	5	8	−3	5		0–0	0–0	2–0	—	0–0
5	Fiji	8	1	3	4	6	35	−29	5		0–4	1–4	0–0	2–1	—

==== Matches ====
25 April 1981

New Zealand	3–3	Australia
G. Turner 25'; Wooddin 34'; Sumner 80'		Krncevic 15', 42'; Boden 31'

Mount Smart Stadium, Auckland
Attendance: 10,000
Referee: Gianfranco Menegali (Italy)

3 May 1981

Fiji	0–4	New Zealand
		B. Turner 8', 31', 85'; Sumner 20'

Govind Park, Ba
Referee: Othman bin Omar (Malaysia)

7 May 1981

Chinese Taipei	0–0	New Zealand

Taipei Stadium, Taipei
Attendance: 12,000
Referee: T. Asami (Japan)

11 May 1981

Indonesia	0–2	New Zealand
		B. Turner 14'; G. Turner 75'

Senayan Stadium, Jakarta
Attendance: 47,000
Referee: N. Ausukont (Thailand)

16 May 1981

Australia	0–2	New Zealand
		Wooddin 29'; G. Turner 81'

Sydney Cricket Ground, Sydney
Attendance: 15,854
Referee: Courtney (England)

20 May 1981

Australia	2–0	Indonesia
Kosmina 29'; Davidson 33'

Olympic Park, Melbourne
Attendance: 10,000
Referee: V. Garcia Oliveira (Portugal)

23 May 1981

New Zealand	5–0	Indonesia
Wooddin 9'; B. Turner 34'; G. Turner 59', 65'; Elrick 81'

Mount Smart Stadium, Auckland
Attendance: 4,742
Referee: V. Garcia Oliveira (Portugal)

30 May 1981

New Zealand	2–0	Chinese Taipei
Wooddin 14'; G. Turner 75'

Mount Smart Stadium, Auckland
Attendance: 3,077
Referee: Boskovic (Australia)
31 May 1981

Fiji	0–0	Indonesia

National Stadium, Suva
Attendance: 8,000
Referee: Lee Kok Leong (Singapore)

6 June 1981

Fiji	2–1	Chinese Taipei
Ratu Jone 55', 55'		Chang Kuo Chi 40'

Govind Park, Ba
Attendance: 6,000
Referee: Dhillon (Singapore)

10 June 1981

Australia	3–2	Chinese Taipei
Henderson 17'; Kosmina 54'; Byrne 68' (pen.)		Duh Deng-Sheng 82', 89'

Hindmarsh Stadium, Adelaide
Attendance: 3,200
Referee: Vijit Getkaen (Thailand)

15 June 1981

Indonesia	1–0	Chinese Taipei
Hadi Ismanto 75'

Senayan Stadium, Jakarta
Attendance: 14,000
Referee: Charupunt (Thailand)

28 June 1981

Chinese Taipei	2–0	Indonesia
Deng Chyan; Jyn Tson

Taipei Stadium, Taipei
Attendance: 7,500
Referee: Nishi (Japan)

26 July 1981

Fiji	1–4	Australia
Vuilabasa 82'		Cole 4', 31'; Barnes 10'; Sharne 28'

National Stadium, Suva
Attendance: 11,000
Referee: Hardjowasito (Indonesia)

4 August 1981

Chinese Taipei	0–0	Fiji

Taipei Stadium, Taipei
Attendance: 5,600
Referee: Brillantes (Philippines)

10 August 1981

Indonesia	3–3	Fiji
Budi Johannis; Upendran Choy (o.g.); Risdianto		Ratu Jone; Meli Vuilabasa; John Morris Williams

Senayan Stadium, Jakarta
Attendance: 16,000
Referee: T. Gurkan (Philippines)

14 August 1981

Australia	10–0	Fiji
Mitchell 29', 43', 80'; Cole 37', 54', 63', 67', 70', 71' (pen.), 75'

Olympic Park, Melbourne
Attendance: 3,500
Referee: Ausukont Nobnom (Thailand)

16 August 1981

New Zealand	13–0	Fiji
Wooddin 2'; Sumner 8', 45', 55', 60', 72', 86'; G. Turner 9', 31'; Cole 36'; B. Turner 40', 85'; Mackay 48'

Mount Smart Stadium, Auckland
Attendance: 3,345
Referee: Vijit Getkaew (Thailand)

30 August 1981

Indonesia	1–0	Australia
Risdianto 88'

Gelora 10 November Stadium, Surabaya
Attendance: 25,000
Referee: R. Reyes (Philippines)

6 September 1981

Chinese Taipei	0–0	Australia

Taipei Stadium, Taipei
Attendance: 7,000
Referee: T. Gurkan (Philippines)

=== Group 2 ===
All matches were played in Riyadh, Saudi Arabia. Saudi Arabia advanced to the final round.

==== Table ====
Pos	Team	Pld	W	D	L	GF	GA	GD	Pts	Qualification
1	Saudi Arabia	4	4	0	0	5	0	+5	8	Advance to the final round
2	Iraq	4	3	0	1	5	2	+3	6	
3	Qatar	4	2	0	2	5	3	+2	4	
4	Bahrain	4	1	0	3	1	6	−5	2	
5	Syria	4	0	0	4	2	7	−5	0	

==== Matches ====
18 March 1981

Iraq	1–0	Qatar
Saeed 84'

Al Malaz Stadium, Riyadh
Attendance: 10,751
Referee: Boskovic (Australia)
19 March 1981

Bahrain	1–0	Syria
Bushegir 89' (pen.)

Al Malaz Stadium, Riyadh
Attendance: 4,154
Referee: Sano (Japan)

21 March 1981

Saudi Arabia	1–0	Iraq
Dabo 82'

Al Malaz Stadium, Riyadh
Attendance: 18,738
Referee: Rubio Vesquez (Mexico)
22 March 1981

Qatar	3–0	Bahrain
Muftah 21', 64'; Salman 35'

Al Malaz Stadium, Riyadh
Attendance: 1,662
Referee: Lee Kok Leong (Singapore)

24 March 1981

Saudi Arabia	2–0	Syria
Jassem 47', 62'

Al Malaz Stadium, Riyadh
Attendance: 30,000
Referee: Nishi (Japan)
25 March 1981

Iraq	2–0	Bahrain
Ahmed 26'; Dirjal 89'

Al Malaz Stadium, Riyadh
Attendance: 1,752
Referee: Dhillon (Singapore)

27 March 1981

Qatar	2–1	Syria
Khalfan 8'; Muftah 53'		Jehad 15'

Al Malaz Stadium, Riyadh
Attendance: 3,967
Referee: Rampley (Australia)
28 March 1981

Saudi Arabia	1–0	Bahrain
Al Nafeesah 71'

Al Malaz Stadium, Riyadh
Attendance: 7,876
Referee: Sano (Japan)

30 March 1981

Iraq	2–1	Syria
Ashraf 34'; Khudhair 63'		Jehad 47'

Al Malaz Stadium, Riyadh
Attendance: 3,285
Referee: Rampley (Australia)
31 March 1981

Saudi Arabia	1–0	Qatar
Aboloya 85'

Al Malaz Stadium, Riyadh
Attendance: 40,000
Referee: Boskovic (Australia)

=== Group 3 ===
All matches were played in Kuwait City, Kuwait. Kuwait advanced to the final round.

==== Table ====
Pos	Team	Pld	W	D	L	GF	GA	GD	Pts	Qualification
1	Kuwait	3	3	0	0	12	0	+12	6	Advance to the final round
2	South Korea	3	2	0	1	7	4	+3	4	
3	Malaysia	3	0	1	2	3	8	−5	1	
4	Thailand	3	0	1	2	3	13	−10	1	

==== Matches ====
21 April 1981

South Korea	2–1	Malaysia
Hong Sung-ho 33'; Lee Kang-jo 84'		Wong Chye 6'

Mohammed Al-Hamad Stadium, Kuwait City
Attendance: 4,000
22 April 1981

Kuwait	6–0	Thailand
Al-Anbari 12', 37'; J. Yaqoub 12'; Kameel 34'; Karam 62'; Al-Dakhil 80'

Mohammed Al-Hamad Stadium, Kuwait City
Attendance: 5,000
Referee: Melvyn D'Souza (India)

24 April 1981

South Korea	5–1	Thailand
Choi Soon-ho 26', 85'; Choi Jong-duk 33'; Oh Seok-jae 68'; Lee Tae-ho 70'		Piyapong 36'

Mohammed Al-Hamad Stadium, Kuwait City
Attendance: 1,000
Referee: Hardjowasito (Indonesia)
25 April 1981

Kuwait	4–0	Malaysia
J. Yaqoub 1'; M. Juma'a 23', 46'; Al-Ghanem 49'

Mohammed Al-Hamad Stadium, Kuwait City
Attendance: 15,000
Referee: Cheung Kwok Hui (Hong Kong)

27 April 1981

Malaysia	2–2	Thailand
Ibrahim Din 50', 63'		Khanthatat 72'; Sompit 49'

Mohammed Al-Hamad Stadium, Kuwait City
Attendance: 2,000
Referee: Valentine (Scotland)
29 April 1981

Kuwait	2–0	South Korea
Al-Anbari 50'; Al-Ghanem 81'

Mohammed Al-Hamad Stadium, Kuwait City
Attendance: 15,000
Referee: Aristizábal Murcia (Colombia)

=== Group 4 ===
All matches were played in Hong Kong.

==== Preliminary matches ====
In the preliminary matches, the winners of pairs one and two and the loser of pair three would be allocated to Group 4A. The other teams were allocated to Group 4B.

Preliminary matches
Team 1	Score	Team 2
China	1–0	Hong Kong
Japan	1–0	Singapore
North Korea	3–0	Macau

===== Matches =====
21 December 1980

China	1–0	Hong Kong
Chen Jingang 89'

Government Stadium, Hong Kong
Attendance: 23,602
Referee: Al-Mauzan (Saudi Arabia)

22 December 1980

Japan	1–0	Singapore
Kimura 20'

Government Stadium, Hong Kong
Attendance: 3,730
Referee: Ausukont (Thailand)

22 December 1980

North Korea	3–0	Macau
Li Yong-sob 34'; Li Chang-ha 41'; Kim Yong-nam 87'

Government Stadium, Hong Kong
Attendance: 3,730
Referee: Demirdjian (Lebanon)

==== Group 4A ====
China and Japan advanced to the Group 4 semi-finals.

===== Table =====
Pos	Team	Pld	W	D	L	GF	GA	GD	Pts	Qualification
1	China	2	2	0	0	4	0	+4	4	Advance to Group 4 semi-finals
2	Japan	2	1	0	1	3	1	+2	2	Advance to Group 4 semi-finals
3	Macau	2	0	0	2	0	6	−6	0	

===== Matches =====
24 December 1980

China	3–0	Macau
Gu Guangming 17'; Zuo Shusheng 20'; Rong Zhixing 59'

Government Stadium, Hong Kong
Attendance: 16,562
Referee: Getkaew (Thailand)

26 December 1980

China	1–0	Japan
Rong Zhixing 7'

Government Stadium, Hong Kong
Attendance: 16,900
Referee: Ali Al-Bannai (Kuwait)

28 December 1980

Japan	3–0	Macau
Kimura 68'; Maeda 80' (pen.); Hasegawa 88'

Government Stadium, Hong Kong
Attendance: 27,629
Referee: Arafat (Syria)

==== Group 4B ====
North Korea and Hong Kong advanced to the Group 4 semi-finals.

===== Table =====
Pos	Team	Pld	W	D	L	GF	GA	GD	Pts	Qualification
1	North Korea	2	1	1	0	3	2	+1	3	Advance to Group 4 semi-finals
2	Hong Kong	2	0	2	0	3	3	0	2	Advance to Group 4 semi-finals
3	Singapore	2	0	1	1	1	2	−1	1	

===== Matches =====
24 December 1980

Hong Kong	1–1	Singapore
Choi York Yee 55'		Pathmanathan 87'

Government Stadium, Hong Kong
Attendance: 16,562
Referee: Arafat (Syria)

26 December 1980

North Korea	1–0	Singapore
Li Yong-sob 7'

Government Stadium, Hong Kong
Attendance: 16,900
Referee: Al-Doy (Bahrain)

28 December 1980

Hong Kong	2–2	North Korea
Wan Chi Keung 40'; Wu Kwok Hung 62'		Li Yong-man 3'; Li Yong-sob 25'

Government Stadium, Hong Kong
Attendance: 27,629
Referee: Demirdjian (Lebanon)

==== Semi-finals ====
After a goalless 90 minutes, Kim Yong-nam scored the only goal in extra time as North Korea defeated Japan while China defeated Hong Kong 5–4 on penalties.

Semi-finals
Team 1	Score	Team 2
North Korea	1–0 (a.e.t.)	Japan
Hong Kong	0–0 (a.e.t.) (4–5 p)	China

30 December 1980

North Korea	1–0 (a.e.t.)	Japan
Kim Yong-nam 114'

Government Stadium, Hong Kong
Attendance: 8,266
Referee: Ali Al-Bannai (Kuwait)

31 December 1980

Hong Kong	0–0 (a.e.t.)	China
Penalties
Wu Kwok Hung (penalty scored); Chee Yit Bo (penalty scored); Chan Fat Chi (penalty missed); Fung Chi Ming (penalty scored); Wan Chi Keung (penalty scored)	4–5	(penalty scored) Huang Xiangdong; (penalty scored) Zuo Shusheng; (penalty scored) Chi Shangbin; (penalty scored) Wang Feng; (penalty scored) Rong Zhixing

Government Stadium, Hong Kong
Attendance: 27,582
Referee: Getkaew (Thailand)

==== Final ====
China scored twice in extra time as they defeated North Korea 4–2 to advance to the final round.

Final
Team 1	Score	Team 2
China	4–2 (a.e.t.)	North Korea

4 January 1981

China	4–2 (a.e.t.)	North Korea
Huang Xiangdong 44', 110'; Chen Xirong 55'; Gu Guangming 112'		Li Chang-ha 2'; Kim Yong-nam 56'

Government Stadium, Hong Kong
Attendance: 15,974
Referee: Al-Deq (Bahrain)

== Final round ==
Both matches between China and Saudi Arabia were played on neutral territory in Malaysia. Kuwait qualified for the 1982 FIFA World Cup. China PR and New Zealand finished level on points in second place and were also tied on goal difference so a play-off on neutral territory was organised to determine which team would qualify.

=== Table ===
Pos	Team	Pld	W	D	L	GF	GA	GD	Pts	Qualification	Kuwait	People's Republic of China	New Zealand	Saudi Arabia
1	Kuwait	6	4	1	1	8	6	+2	9	Qualification for the 1982 FIFA World Cup	—	1–0	2–2	2–0
2	China	6	3	1	2	9	4	+5	7	Qualification for the play-off	3–0	—	0–0	4–2
2	New Zealand	6	2	3	1	11	6	+5	7	Qualification for the play-off	1–2	1–0	—	2–2
4	Saudi Arabia	6	0	1	5	4	16	−12	1		0–1	0–2	0–5	—

=== Matches ===
24 September 1981

China	0–0	New Zealand

Worker's Stadium, Beijing
Attendance: 63,000
Referee: Sano (Japan)

3 October 1981

New Zealand	1–0	China
Herbert 43'

Mount Smart Stadium, Auckland
Attendance: 15,903
Referee: Getkaew (Thailand)

10 October 1981

New Zealand	1–2	Kuwait
Wooddin 24'		Al-Dakhil 61' (pen.); J. Yaqoub 90'

Mount Smart Stadium, Auckland
Attendance: 21,101
Referee: Hardjowasito (Indonesia)

18 October 1981

China	3–0	Kuwait
Rong Zhixing 24'; Gu Guangming 28'; Shen Xiangfu 59'

Worker's Stadium, Beijing
Attendance: 63,000
Referee: Boskovic (Australia)

4 November 1981

Saudi Arabia	0–1	Kuwait
		Al-Anbari 55'

Prince Faisal bin Fahd Stadium, Riyadh
Attendance: 28,000
Referee: Grey (England)

12 November 1981

China	4–2	Saudi Arabia
Zuo Shusheng 62'; Chen Jingang 63'; Gu Guangming 76'; Huang Xiangdong 88'		Al Nifawi 10'; Majed Abdullah 11'

Merdeka Stadium, Kuala Lumpur, Malaysia
Attendance: 40,000
Referee: Ponnet (Belgium)

19 November 1981

China	2–0	Saudi Arabia
Huang Xiangdong 24'; Cai Jinbiao 27'

Merdeka Stadium, Kuala Lumpur, Malaysia
Attendance: 45,000
Referee: Wright (Brazil)

28 November 1981

New Zealand	2–2	Saudi Arabia
McClure 5' (pen.); Herbert 87'		Majed Abdullah 37', 41'

Mount Smart Stadium, Auckland
Referee: Ithurralde (Argentina)

30 November 1981

Kuwait	1–0	China
Al-Anbari 7'

Mohammed Al-Hamad Stadium, Kuwait City
Attendance: 15,000
Referee: Lee Kok Leong (Singapore)

7 December 1981

Kuwait	2–0	Saudi Arabia
Al-Dakhil 36', 56'

Mohammed Al-Hamad Stadium, Kuwait City
Attendance: 25,000
Referee: Redelfs (West Germany)

14 December 1981

Kuwait	2–2	New Zealand
Kameel 41'; Al-Hashash 89'		Sumner 65'; Rufer 66'

Mohammed Al-Hamad Stadium, Kuwait City
Attendance: 20,000
Referee: Lund-Sørensen (Denmark)

19 December 1981

Saudi Arabia	0–5	New Zealand
		Rufer 16', 39'; B. Turner 17', 43' (pen.); Wooddin 38'

Prince Faisal bin Fahd Stadium, Riyadh
Attendance: 5,000
Referee: Corver (Netherlands)

=== Play-off ===
Several locations were considered for the play-off including Spain, Malaysia and Australia before Singapore was chosen to host the match. Goals from Steve Wooddin and Wynton Rufer saw New Zealand run out 2–1 winners as they qualified for the 1982 FIFA World Cup.

Play-off
Team 1	Score	Team 2
New Zealand	2–1	China

10 January 1982

New Zealand	2–1	China
Wooddin 24'; Rufer 47'		Huang Xiangdong 75'

National Stadium, Singapore
Attendance: 60,000
Referee: Arppi Filho (Brazil)

== Qualified teams ==
Both Kuwait and New Zealand qualified for the first time. As of 2026, it remains the only time Kuwait have qualified.

Team	Qualified as	Qualified on	Previous appearances in FIFA World Cup
Kuwait	Final round winners	14 December 1981	0 (debut)
New Zealand	Play-off winners	10 January 1982	0 (debut)

== Goalscorers ==
There were 173 goals scored in 61 matches, for an average of 2.84 goals per match.

9 goals

- (Australia) Gary Cole
- (New Zealand) Steve Sumner
- (New Zealand) Brian Turner

8 goals

- (New Zealand) Grant Turner
- (New Zealand) Steve Wooddin

5 goals

- (China) Huang Xiangdong
- (Kuwait) Abdulaziz Al-Anberi

4 goals

- (China) Gu Guangming
- (Kuwait) Faisal Al-Dakhil
- (New Zealand) Wynton Rufer

3 goals

- (Australia) Dave Mitchell
- (China) Rong Zhixing
- (Chinese Taipei) Deng Chyan
- (Fiji) Ratu Jone
- (Kuwait) Jasem Yaqoub
- (North Korea) Kim Yong-nam
- (North Korea) Li Yong-sob
- (Qatar) Mansour Muftah
- (Saudi Arabia) Majed Abdullah

2 goals

- (Australia) John Kosmina
- (Australia) Eddie Krncevic
- (China) Chen Jingang
- (China) Zuo Shusheng
- (Fiji) Meli Vuilabasa
- (Indonesia) Herry Risdianto
- (Japan) Kazushi Kimura
- (Kuwait) Nassir Al-Ghanem
- (Kuwait) Fathi Kameel
- (Malaysia) Ibrahim Din
- (New Zealand) Ricki Herbert
- (North Korea) Li Chang-ha
- (Saudi Arabia) Saud Jassem
- (South Korea) Choi Soon-ho
- (Syria) Shait Ahmed Jehad

1 goal

- (Australia) Murray Barnes
- (Australia) Ken Boden
- (Australia) Gary Byrne
- (Australia) Alan Davidson
- (Australia) Tony Henderson
- (Australia) Peter Sharne
- (Bahrain) Fouad Bushegir
- (China) Cai Jinbiao
- (China) Chen Xirong
- (China) Shen Xiangfu
- (Chinese Taipei) Chang Kuo Chi
- (Chinese Taipei) Jyn Tson
- (Fiji) John Morris Williams
- (Hong Kong) Choi Jork Yee
- (Hong Kong) Wan Chi Keung
- (Hong Kong) Wu Kwok Hung
- (Indonesia) Hadi Ismanto
- (Indonesia) Budi Johannis
- (Iraq) Nazar Ashraf
- (Iraq) Hadi Ahmed
- (Iraq) Adnan Dirjal
- (Iraq) Adel Khudhair
- (Iraq) Hussein Saeed
- (Japan) Haruhisa Hasegawa
- (Japan) Hideki Maeda
- (Kuwait) Sami Al-Hashash
- (Kuwait) Mahboub Juma'a
- (Kuwait) Mohammed Karam
- (Malaysia) James Wong Chye Fook
- (New Zealand) Duncan Cole
- (New Zealand) Adrian Elrick
- (New Zealand) Keith Mackay
- (New Zealand) Billy McClure
- (North Korea) Li Yong-man
- (Qatar) Ibrahim Khalfan
- (Qatar) Khalid Salman
- (Saudi Arabia) Shaye Al Nafeesah
- (Saudi Arabia) Ahmed Al Nifawi
- (Saudi Arabia) Yousef Aboloya
- (Saudi Arabia) Amin Dabo
- (Singapore) Thasmbiayah Pathmanathan
- (South Korea) Choi Jong-duk
- (South Korea) Hong Sung-ho
- (South Korea) Lee Kang-jo
- (South Korea) Lee Tae-ho
- (South Korea) Oh Seok-jae
- (Thailand) Piyapong Pue-On
- (Thailand) Khan Thatat Songwuti
- (Thailand) Sompit Suwannapluoh

1 own goal

- (Fiji) Upendran Choy (playing against Indonesia)

== See also ==
- 1982 FIFA World Cup qualification (UEFA)
- 1982 FIFA World Cup qualification (CONMEBOL)
- 1982 FIFA World Cup qualification (CONCACAF)
- 1982 FIFA World Cup qualification (CAF)
