= Kim Jong-pil (disambiguation) =

Kim Jong-pil (1926-2018) was a South Korean politician who served as Prime Minister.

Kim Jong-pil may also refer to:

- Kim Jong-pil (footballer, born 1955)
- Kim Jong-pil (footballer, born 1956)
- Kim Jong-pil (footballer, born 1992)
