= Li Fusheng =

Chinese footballer (1953–2007)

Li Fusheng 李富胜
Personal information
- Full name: Li Fusheng
- Date of birth: 4 January 1953
- Place of birth: Ju County, Shandong, China
- Date of death: 2 December 2007 (aged 54)
- Place of death: Beijing, China
- Height: 1.78 m (5 ft 10 in)
- Position: Goalkeeper

Senior career*
Years	Team	Apps	(Gls)
1973–1974	Chengdu Military Football Team		
1975–1984	Bayi Football Team		

International career
1976–1984	China PR	119	(0)
Medal record
Men's football
Representing China
AFC Asian Cup
Bronze medal – third place	1976 Iran	Team
Silver medal – second place	1984 Singapore	Team
Asian Games
Bronze medal – third place	1978 Bangkok	Football
- * Club domestic league appearances and goals

Li Fusheng (Chinese: 李富胜; 4 January 1953 – 2 December 2007) was a Chinese international football goalkeeper. He represented Chengdu Military Football Team and Bayi Football Team at club level while also having a long association representing China at international level where he made 119 appearances making him China's highest capped goalkeeper.

== Playing career ==
Li Fusheng was born in Ju County, Shandong but moved to Dalian to receive training in a Sports School where after he graduated he got a job in a petroleum factory to support his family after the death of his father. This was short lived after he was able to gain a place within the youth team of Dalian football club in 1972 before he then moved to the senior team Chengdu military football team in 1973. By 1975 the Bayi Football Team who were the top military football team took Li Fusheng into their club and his career started to flourish after his performances were impressive enough to receive a call up to the Chinese national team and even go on to be included in the squad that came third in the 1976 AFC Asian Cup. After the tournament he would go on to become the team's first choice goalkeeper for the next several seasons and was part of the squad who narrowly missed out in qualifying for the 1982 FIFA World Cup, losing to New Zealand in a play-off.

== Life outside football ==
After a highly distinguished career where he was a highly regarded goalkeeper despite being relatively short for a goalkeeper he would retire from football in 1984 and move into coaching taking on a coaching role within Bayi Football Team before becoming the team's leader. His role as a coach gave him access to the problems within Chinese football and he along with several other high-profile former players demanded the Chinese FA conform to full professionalism. After achieving this he would decide to move away from football and join the Chinese Communist Party where he went to the Central Party School and then the PLA National Defense University to become a Colonel before he took on a position at the Military Museum of the Chinese People's Revolution where he was the deputy director in charge of cultural relics. In August 2007 after moving to a home and decorating he fell off a ladder and sustained serious head injuries. He stayed within the hospital for three months before dying of his injuries on December 2, 2007.

== Honours ==
Bayi Football Team

- China national league: 1977, 1981
