= Ibrahim Al-Rumaihi =

Qatari footballer

Personal information
- Place of birth: Qatar
- Position: Defender

Senior career*
Years	Team	Apps	(Gls)
- Qatar SC

International career
- Qatar
- * Club domestic league appearances and goals

Ibrahim Saeed Al-Rumaihi is a Qatari football defender who played as a defender. He represented Qatar in the 1984 Asian Cup.
