= Peter Rajah =

Malaysian footballer

Personal information
- Date of birth: 1 April 1951
- Place of birth: Singapore
- Date of death: 14 November 2014 (aged 63)
- Place of death: Sandakan, Malaysia
- Height: 6 ft 0 in (1.84 m)
- Position: Goalkeeper

Senior career*
Years	Team	Apps	(Gls)
1972–1987	Sabah		
1992–1993	Sabah		

International career
1979–1981	Malaysia	7	(0)
- * Club domestic league appearances and goals

Peter Rajah (1 April 1951 – 14 November 2014) was a Malaysian footballer who played as a goalkeeper for Sabah and the national team.

Peter was born in Singapore. His father is from Kuantan, Pahang and his mother is from Sabah. He played for Sabah between 1972 until 1987. He came out of retirement in 1992 when Sabah coach at that time, Oldřich Sedláček asked him to return.

Peter was a member of the Malaysian team who qualified for the 1980 Moscow Olympics, which Malaysia did not participate in boycott of the Soviet invasion of Afghanistan. He also part of Malaysia squad in the 1980 AFC Asian Cup in Kuwait.

== Honours ==
Sabah

- Malaysian League Tournament runner-up: 1979
- Borneo Cup: 1972, 1977, 1978, 1979, 1980, 1984, 1985
