= Osama Noori =

Iraqi association football player

Personal information
- Full name: Osama Noori Fathi
- Date of birth: 17 May 1958 (age 68)
- Place of birth: Iraq
- Position: Midfielder

Senior career*
| Years | Team | Apps | (Gls) |
| 1977-1991 | Al-Quwa Al-Jawiya | | |
| 1991-1992 | Al-Khutoot | | |
| 1992-1993 | Al-Naft SC | | |
| 1993-1994 | Al Shorta | | |
| 1994-1995 | Al-Sinaa SC | | |

International career
| 1982-1983 | Iraq | | |
- * Club domestic league appearances and goals

Osama Noori (born 17 May 1958) is a former Iraqi football defender who played for Iraq at the 1982 Asian Games.

Osama played for Iraq in 1982 .
