= Razali Saad (footballer) =

Singaporean footballer

Personal information
- Date of birth: 14 August 1964 (age 62)
- Place of birth: Singapore
- Position: Defender

International career
Years	Team	Apps	(Gls)
1984–1993	Singapore	53	

Razali Saad (born 14 August 1964) is a Singaporean football defender who played for Singapore in the 1984 Asian Cup.

Razali played in the 1993 Southeast Asian Games. During the semi-finals against Myanmar when the match went to a penalty shoot-out, he missed the penalty kick and Singapore lost the match.

Razali later became a member of the Football Association of Singapore (FAS) council. He was also a board member of Sport Singapore.

In 2017, Razali, as part of the team led by Lim Kia Tong, was elected into the FAS council and appointed as vice-president. The same team was reelected in the 2021 FAS council election and Razali retained his vice-president position.

Sporting positions
Preceded by Malek Awab	Singapore national team captain 1986-1988	Succeeded by Terry Pathmanathan
