= Yoon In-sun =

South Korean footballer

Personal information
- Date of birth: 1958 (age 67–68)
- Place of birth: South Korea
- Position: Defender

Senior career*
Years	Team	Apps	(Gls)
1980	Yonsei University		

International career
1980	South Korea	1	(0)
- * Club domestic league appearances and goals

- Yoon In-sun
- Hangul: 윤인선
- Hanja: 尹仁善
- RR: Yun Inseon
- MR: Yun Insŏn

Yoon In-sun (born 1958) is a Korean football defender who played for South Korea in the 1980 President's Cup Football Tournament against Bahrain. He also played for Yonsei University.

== International record ==
Year	Apps	Goal
1980	1	0
Total	1	0
