= Issam Mahrous =

Syrian footballer

Essam Mahrous
Personal information
- Place of birth: Syria
- Position: Defender

International career
Years	Team	Apps	(Gls)
- Syria

Issam Mahrous is a Syrian former footballer who played for the national team as a defender. Mahrous represented Syria in the 1984 Asian Cup.
