= Mohamed Jazaeri =

Syrian footballer (born 1958)

Personal information
- Date of birth: 18 February 1958 (age 68)

International career
Years	Team	Apps	(Gls)
- Syria

Mohamed Jazaeri (born 18 February 1958) is a Syrian footballer. He competed in the men's tournament at the 1980 Summer Olympics.
