= Ahmed Eid Maher Beirakdar =

Syrian footballer (born 1955)

Personal information
- Date of birth: 2 May 1955 (age 71)

International career
Years	Team	Apps	(Gls)
- Syria

Ahmed Eid Maher Beirakdar (born 2 May 1955) is a Syrian footballer. He competed in the men's tournament at the 1980 Summer Olympics.
