= Anbar Said =

Kuwaiti footballer (1959–2026)

Personal information
- Full name: Anbar Said Maqroun
- Date of birth: 1959
- Date of death: 2 August 2026 (aged 67)
- Position: Forward

Youth career
- 1972–1978: Al-Arabi

Senior career*
Years	Team	Apps	(Gls)
1978–1994	Al-Arabi	305	(132)
1990–1991	→ Ahli Sidab Club		

International career
1982–1990	Kuwait	11+	(1+)
Medal record
Men's football
Representing Kuwait
Football at the Asian Games
Silver medal – second place	1982 India
- * Club domestic league appearances and goals

Anbar Said Maqroun (Arabic: عنبر سعيد مقرون; 1959 – 2 August 2026) was a Kuwaiti footballer who played as a forward.

== Club career ==
Said joined Kuwaiti club Al-Arabi in 1972, making his first team debut for the club in 1978 under Scottish manager Dave Mackay. He primarily played for Al-Arabi during the 1980s, and helped them win the 1st GCC Club Championship in 1982. He later played briefly in Oman with Ahli Sidab Club during the Gulf War.

In total, Said made 305 appearances for Al-Arabi, scoring 132 goals and helping them win eight Kuwaiti Premier League titles, three Kuwait Emir Cups, two Kuwait Joint League titles, and the GFF Gulf Club Championship in 1982. During his career, he was known for his goal scoring and jumping abilities.

== International career ==
Said represented the Kuwait national team, and was part of their silver medal-winning team at the 1982 Asian Games. He also represented Kuwait at the 1979 and 1988 Arabian Gulf Cups, the 1988 AFC Asian Cup in Qatar, and the 1990 Asian Games in Beijing, where he made his final appearance for the national team.

== Death ==
Said died on 2 August 2026, at the age of 67, following a car collision.
