= Aminur Rahman (footballer) =

Bangladeshi footballer (1954–2024)

Personal information
- Full name: Mohamed Aminur Rahman
- Date of birth: 1 December 1954
- Place of birth: Narayanganj, East Bengal, Pakistan (present-day Bangladesh)
- Date of death: 17 May 2024 (aged 69)
- Place of death: Narayanganj, Bangladesh
- Height: 1.78 m (5 ft 10 in)
- Positions: Centre-back; left-back

Senior career*
Years	Team	Apps	(Gls)
1970	Railway Blues		
1972	B.G. Press SRC		
1973–1975	Rahmatganj MFS		
1976	B.G. Press SRC		
1977–1978	Sadharan Bima CSC		
1979–1982	Team BJMC		

International career
1980	Bangladesh	2	(0)
- * Club domestic league appearances and goals

Aminur Rahman (Bengali: আমিনুর রহমান; 1 December 1954 – 17 May 2024) was a Bangladeshi footballer who played as a centre-back. He made two appearances for the Bangladesh national team from 1979 to 1980.

== Playing career ==
Joy Govinda High School, next to Aminur's house, was where he started his education and sports journey. He excelled in inter-school football and athletics, and after passing matriculation in 1968, he joined Government Tolaram College in 1969. He won the East Pakistan inter-college football tournament the following year, and eventually took up a job at Dhakashwari Mills while also playing football in the Narayanganj District League. In 1970, he represented Railway Blues in the Dhaka Second Division League and after the Bangladesh Liberation War, joined B.G. Press SRC in the First Division. In 1973, he participated in India's Bordoloi Trophy with Rahmatganj MFS. In 1977, he was the club captain of Sadharan Bima CSC in the First Division, and in 1979 he was league champion with Team BJMC.

== International career ==
In 1979, the same year in which he won the First Division League title with Team BJMC, Aminur was included in the Bangladesh national team squad to participate in an unofficial exhibition match in Dhaka against South Korea national B team which had won the 1979 Merdeka Cup. Aminur made two official appearances for the senior international team, both coming at the 1980 AFC Asian Cup in Kuwait, against Iran and China, respectively.

== Death ==
On 17 May 2024, Aminur died after suffering a cardiac arrest at his residency in Paikpara, Narayanganj. He was 69.

== Honours ==
Team BJMC

- Dhaka First Division League: 1979
