= Kampung Pintu Padang =

Village in Malaysia

Kampung Pintu Padang is a traditional Malay village located within the outskirt of Gopeng, Perak. It is populated by the Rawa Malay community. The Darul Hikmah Orphanage is located here. It was built by Hajjah Embun Bt Mohd Ali and his late husband, Haji Din B Kimi, both retired teachers. Hajjah Embun was one of the recipients of NSTP-PWC Malaysian Humanitarian Award 2006, which was presented to her by the previous Prime Minister of Malaysia, Tun Abdullah Ahmad Badawi.
