= Zang Cailing =

Chinese footballer and coach

Zang Cailing 臧蔡灵
Personal information
- Full name: Zang Cailing
- Date of birth: 18 May 1954 (age 72)
- Place of birth: Dalian, Liaoning, China
- Height: 1.73 m (5 ft 8 in)
- Position: Defender

Youth career
- 1969–1972: Dalian Sports School

Senior career*
| Years | Team | Apps | (Gls) |
| 1972–1975 | Dalian Mining Plant | | |
| 1975–1977 | Air Force Football Team | | |
| 1984–1985 | Bayi Football Team | | |
| 1985–1986 | Dalian FC | | |

International career
| 1980–1982 | China | 23 | (0) |

Managerial career
- 1986–1987: Dalian FC Youth
- * Club domestic league appearances and goals

Zang Cailing (Chinese: 臧蔡灵; born May 18, 1954, in Dalian) is a Chinese coach and former international football player who represented Dalian Mining Plant, Air Force Football Team, Bayi Football Team and Dalian FC while internationally he played for China in the 1980 Asian Cup.

== Playing career ==
Zang Cailing initially followed in his fathers footsteps and trained to be a carpenter before he joined the Dalian Sports School. After he graduated he joined amateur football club Dalian Mining Plant before impressing the Air Force Football Team to sign him. With the club under the sport branch of the People's Liberation Army Air Force, Zang would be conscripted, however he found military life hard to adjust to. Despite this Air Force Football Team were allowed to take part in the top tier of Chinese football, which got Zang noticed for the Chinese national team. Within the national team Zang would be converted from a striker to a defender under Su Yongshun who included him in the 1980 Asian Cup, 1982 World Cup Qualifiers and 1982 Asian Games. Zang would return to club football and joined Bayi Football Team before joining Dalian FC where he retired.

== Career statistics ==
=== International statistics ===
| Competition | Year | Apps | Goal |
|---|---|---|---|
| Great Wall Cup | 1980 | 1 | 0 |
| Friendly | 1980-1982 | 5 | 0 |
| Asian Cup | 1980 | 2 | 0 |
| World Cup Qualifiers | 1980-1982 | 12 | 0 |
| Asian Games | 1982 | 3 | 0 |
| Total | | 23 | 0 |
