= Sadiq Jaber =

Iraqi association football player

Personal information
- Full name: Sadiq Jaber Khalaf
- Date of birth: 20 August 1960 (age 66)
- Place of birth: Iraq
- Position: Goalkeeper

Senior career*
Years	Team	Apps	(Gls)
- Al-Shorta
- Al-Talaba SC
- Al Shabab
- Al-Talaba SC

International career
1982-1983	Iraq		
- * Club domestic league appearances and goals

Sadiq Jaber (born 20 August 1960) is an Iraqi former football goalkeeper who played for Iraq at the 1982 Asian Games.

Jaber played for Iraq in 1982.
