= Mohammed Dahman =

Syrian footballer (1959–2024)

Personal information
- Date of birth: 8 May 1959
- Place of birth: Syria
- Date of death: 2 June 2024 (aged 65)
- Position: Defender

International career
Years	Team	Apps	(Gls)
- Syria

Mohammed Dahman (8 May 1959 – 2 June 2024) was a Syrian international footballer who participated in football at the 1980 Summer Olympics.
