= Malek Awab =

Singaporean footballer

Personal information
- Full name: Malek bin Awab
- Date of birth: 11 January 1961 (age 65)
- Place of birth: Singapore
- Height: 1.66 m (5 ft 5 1/2 in)
- Position: Midfielder

Senior career*
Years	Team	Apps	(Gls)
1980–1984	Singapore Lions	109	(34)
1984–1988	Kuala Lumpur FA	82	(9)
1999–1989	PDRM FA		
1990–1994	Singapore Lions	98	(15)
1996	Tampines Rovers		
1997	Home United		
1998	Woodlands Wellington FC		

International career
1980–1996	Singapore	121	
- * Club domestic league appearances and goals

Malek bin Awab is a Singaporean former footballer who played as a midfielder in the 1980s and 1990s. Malek Awab also once held the record for the most number of international caps for his country, Singapore (121 caps).

== Football career ==
=== Club ===
Malek started his football career with Farrer Park United as a right winger.

Malek played for the Kuala Lumpur FA side that won the Malaysia Cup in 1988. After playing for Kuala Lumpur FA, Malek joined PDRM FA for a year.

In 1998, Malek joined Woodlands Wellington FC as a sweeper.

=== International ===
Malek was spotted by national coach Jita Singh and brought on to the national team on 13 October 1980.

Malek played in his first international game at King's Cup, Bangkok, 1980.

Representing the Lions in midfield, Malek was often seen running tirelessly for 90 minutes of the game, closing down on opposition players and making cutting runs into the opponents half. Together with Fandi Ahmad, Abbas Saad and V. Sundramoorthy, they formed the backbone of the Singapore team that won the Malaysia Cup in 1994.

Malek played his last international match during the 1996 Tiger Cup.

=== Coaching ===
After retirement from professional football, Malek coaches children at the Kaki Bukit Sports Club.

== Career ==
Outside of football, Malek is a sales manager for Pacific Sports Private Limited since 1980s.

== Personal life ==
Malek is married to seamstress Sharifah Nazihah.

== Honours ==
Singapore Lions

- Malaysia Premier League: 1994
- Malaysia Cup: 1980, 1994

== See also ==
- List of men's footballers with 100 or more international caps

Sporting positions
Preceded by Au Yeong Pak Kuan	Singapore national team captain 1985-1986	Succeeded by Razali Saad
