= Sami Al-Hashash =

Kuwaiti footballer

Personal information
- Full name: Sami Mohamed Al-Hashash
- Date of birth: 15 September 1959 (age 67)
- Place of birth: Kuwait
- Height: 1.82 m (6 ft 0 in)
- Position: Defender

Senior career*
Years	Team	Apps	(Gls)
1977–1993	Al-Arabi SC		

International career
1979–1985	Kuwait		
- * Club domestic league appearances and goals

Sami Mohamed Al-Hashash (Arabic: سَامِي مُحَمَّد الْحَشَّاش; born 15 September 1959) is a Kuwaiti football defender who played for Kuwait in the 1982 FIFA World Cup. He also played for Al-Arabi SC.
