= Tukamin Bahari =

Malaysian footballer

Tukamin Bahari (sometimes spelt as Tukiman Bahari) (born 1957) was a Malaysian footballer who played for Johor and the Malaysia national team.

== Career ==
Tukamin was born in Johor. A forward, he was a squad player for Malaysia national team in the 1980 AFC Asian Cup. He scored two goals in that competition, scoring in the 2–0 win against the UAE and drawing 1–1 against Qatar in the group stage.

He also part of the Malaysian team that qualified to the 1980 Olympic games Moscow which Malaysia boycotted. Malaysia won the play-off against South Korea with a 2–1 score in the Merdeka Stadium.

== Death ==
On 2 November 2014, he died at age 58 due to stroke.

== Honours ==
Johor

- Malaysia Kings Gold Cup: 1979
