= 1984 AFC Asian Cup =

1984年亞洲盃足球賽 Piala Asia 1984 1984 AFC ஆசிய கோப்பை

Tournament details
- Host country: Singapore
- Dates: 1–16 December
- Teams: 10
- Venue: 1 (in 1 host city)

Final positions
- Champions: Saudi Arabia (1st title)
- Runners-up: China
- Third place: Kuwait
- Fourth place: Iran

Tournament statistics
- Matches played: 24
- Goals scored: 44 (1.83 per match)
- Attendance: 316,537 (13,189 per match)
- Top scorer(s): (Iran) Shahrokh Bayani (Iran) Nasser Mohammadkhani (China) Jia Xiuquan (3 goals each)
- Best player: (China) Jia Xiuquan
- Best goalkeeper: (Saudi Arabia) Abdullah Al-Deayea
- Fair play award: China

The 1984 AFC Asian Cup (Mandarin Chinese: 1984年亞洲盃足球賽, Malay: Piala Asia 1984, Tamil: 1984 AFC ஆசிய கோப்பை) was the eighth international association football championship for members of the Asian Football Confederation (AFC). Hosted by Singapore, the competition ran from 1 to 16 December 1984 and was contested by the national teams of China, India, Iran, Kuwait, Qatar, Saudi Arabia, Singapore, South Korea, Syria and the United Arab Emirates.

The final was contested by Saudi Arabia and China. Goals from Shaye Al-Nafisah and Majed Abdullah helped Saudi Arabia to a 2–0 win as they won the competition for the first time.

== Background ==
The inaugural AFC Asian Cup was held in Hong Kong in 1956. Kuwait were the defending champions after defeating South Korea 3–0 in the final of the previous edition in 1980 as hosts. Iran were the most successful team in the history of the competition, having won the title three times previously.

== Qualification ==
Singapore qualified automatically as hosts and Kuwait qualified automatically as holders. In total, 29 teams were included in the qualifying draw but eight would withdraw without playing a match.

The teams were split into four qualifying groups of various sizes. Iran and Syria qualified as the winners and runners-up respectively of group one. In group two, Saudi Arabia and the United Arab Emirates qualified as group winners and runners-up respectively. South Korea and India qualified as group winners and runners-up respectively of group three. China and Qatar qualified from group four as group winners and runners-up respectively.

=== Participants ===
Nations qualified for the 1984 AFC Asian Cup
| Team | Qualified as | Qualified on | Previous appearance |
|---|---|---|---|
| Singapore | Hosts | N/A | 0 (debut) |
| Kuwait | 1980 AFC Asian Cup champions | 30 September 1980 | 3 (1972, 1976, 1980) |
| Iran | Group 1 winners | 15 August 1984 | 4 (1968, 1972, 1976, 1980) |
| Syria | Group 1 runners-up | 15 August 1984 | 1 (1980) |
| Saudi Arabia | Group 2 winners | 26 October 1984 | 0 (debut) |
| United Arab Emirates | Group 2 runners-up | 12 May 1979 | 1 (1980) |
| South Korea | Group 3 winners | 19 October 1984 | 5 (1956, 1960, 1964, 1972, 1980) |
| India | Group 3 runners-up | 19 October 1984 | 1 (1964) |
| China | Group 4 winners | 20 October 1984 | 2 (1976, 1980) |
| Qatar | Group 4 runners-up | 20 October 1984 | 1 (1980) |

== Format ==
The 10 teams were drawn into two single round robin groups of five teams. The group winners and runners-up would contest the semi-finals which would decide the teams contesting the final and the third-place play-off.

== Venue ==
All matches were played at the National Stadium in Kallang.

| Kallang is located in Singapore | Kallang |
|---|---|
| Kallang is located in Singapore | National Stadium |
| Kallang is located in Singapore | Capacity: 55,000 |

== Group stage ==
=== Group A ===
Saudi Arabia and Kuwait advanced to the semi-finals.

==== Table ====
| Pos | Team | Pld | W | D | L | GF | GA | GD | Pts | Qualification |
|---|---|---|---|---|---|---|---|---|---|---|
| 1 | Saudi Arabia | 4 | 2 | 2 | 0 | 4 | 2 | +2 | 6 | Advance to semi-finals |
| 2 | Kuwait | 4 | 2 | 1 | 1 | 4 | 2 | +2 | 5 | Advance to semi-finals |
| 3 | Qatar | 4 | 1 | 2 | 1 | 3 | 3 | 0 | 4 | |
| 4 | Syria | 4 | 1 | 1 | 2 | 3 | 5 | −2 | 3 | |
| 5 | South Korea | 4 | 0 | 2 | 2 | 1 | 3 | −2 | 2 | |

==== Matches ====
1 December 1984
19:00

| Qatar | 1–1 | Syria |
|---|---|---|
| Khalfan 7' | | Anber 47' (o.g.) |

National Stadium, Singapore
Attendance: 8,000
Referee: Antonio Márquez (Mexico)

2 December 1984
19:00

| Saudi Arabia | 1–1 | South Korea |
|---|---|---|
| Abdullah 90' | | Lee Tae-ho 51' |

National Stadium, Singapore
Attendance: 24,340
Referee: George Joseph (Malaysia)

3 December 1984
21:00

| Kuwait | 1–0 | Qatar |
|---|---|---|
| Al-Rumaihi 52' (o.g.) |

National Stadium, Singapore
Attendance: 18,525
Referee: Augusto Lamo (Spain)

4 December 1984
21:00

| Syria | 0–1 | Saudi Arabia |
|---|---|---|
| | | Al-Dosari 66' |

National Stadium, Singapore
Attendance: 2,000
Referee: Shizuo Takada (Japan)

5 December 1984
19:00

| South Korea | 0–0 | Kuwait |

National Stadium, Singapore
Attendance: 20,752
Referee: Cheung Kwok Kui (Hong Kong)

7 December 1984
21:00

| Syria | 1–0 | South Korea |
|---|---|---|
| Hassan 12' |

National Stadium, Singapore
Attendance: 9,270
Referee: George Courtney (England)

8 December 1984
19:00

| Qatar | 1–1 | Saudi Arabia |
|---|---|---|
| Zaid 47' | | Al-Jawad 65' |

National Stadium, Singapore
Attendance: 15,000
Referee: Antonio Márquez (Mexico)

9 December 1984
19:00

| Kuwait | 3–1 | Syria |
|---|---|---|
| Mahrous 66' (o.g.); Al-Dakhil 77'; Al-Buloushi 79' | | Abu Al-Sel 5' |

National Stadium, Singapore
Attendance: 8,000
Referee: Cheung Kwok Kui (Hong Kong)

10 December 1984
21:00

| South Korea | 0–1 | Qatar |
|---|---|---|
| | | Salman 69' |

National Stadium, Singapore
Attendance: 3,659
Referee: Augusto Lamo (Spain)

11 December 1984
21:00

| Kuwait | 0–1 | Saudi Arabia |
|---|---|---|
| | | Al-Jam'an 88' |

National Stadium, Singapore
Attendance: 10,980
Referee: Toshikazu Sano (Japan)

=== Group B ===
China and Iran advanced to the semi-finals.

==== Table ====
| Pos | Team | Pld | W | D | L | GF | GA | GD | Pts | Qualification |
|---|---|---|---|---|---|---|---|---|---|---|
| 1 | China | 4 | 3 | 0 | 1 | 10 | 2 | +8 | 6 | Advance to semi-finals |
| 2 | Iran | 4 | 2 | 2 | 0 | 6 | 1 | +5 | 6 | Advance to semi-finals |
| 3 | United Arab Emirates | 4 | 2 | 0 | 2 | 3 | 8 | −5 | 4 | |
| 4 | Singapore | 4 | 1 | 1 | 2 | 3 | 4 | −1 | 3 | |
| 5 | India | 4 | 0 | 1 | 3 | 0 | 7 | −7 | 1 | |

==== Matches ====
1 December 1984
21:00

| Iran | 3–0 | United Arab Emirates |
|---|---|---|
| Alidousti 27'; Shahrokh Bayani 85' (pen.); Mohammadkhani 87' |

National Stadium, Singapore
Attendance: 9,000
Referee: Toshikazu Sano (Japan)

2 December 1984
21:00

| Singapore | 2–0 | India |
|---|---|---|
| Malek 36'; Razali 81' |

National Stadium, Singapore
Attendance: 55,000
Referee: Antonio Márquez (Mexico)

3 December 1984
19:00

| Iran | 2–0 | China |
|---|---|---|
| Mohammadkhani 57'; Arabshahi 69' |

National Stadium, Singapore
Attendance: 18,525
Referee: George Courtney (England)

4 December 1984
19:00

| United Arab Emirates | 2–0 | India |
|---|---|---|
| Al-Talyani 81'; Khamees 88' |

National Stadium, Singapore
Attendance: 2,000
Referee: Abu Wahid Shanbe (Oman)

5 December 1984
21:00

| Singapore | 0–2 | China |
|---|---|---|
| | | Jia Xiuquan 21'; Zhao Dayu 39' |

National Stadium, Singapore
Attendance: 20,752
Referee: Ahmed Jassim (Bahrain)

7 December 1984
19:00

| Iran | 0–0 | India |

National Stadium, Singapore
Attendance: 10,000
Referee: Koh Guan Kiat (Malaysia)

8 December 1984
21:00

| Singapore | 0–1 | United Arab Emirates |
|---|---|---|
| | | Abdulrahman 62' |

National Stadium, Singapore
Attendance: 15,000
Referee: Jassim Mandi (Bahrain)

9 December 1984
21:00

| China | 3–0 | India |
|---|---|---|
| Lin Lefeng 19'; Gu Guangming 59'; Jia Xiuquan 79' |

National Stadium, Singapore
Attendance: 8,256
Referee: Ahmed Jassim (Bahrain)

10 December 1984
19:00

| Singapore | 1–1 | Iran |
|---|---|---|
| Razali 61' | | Shahrokh Bayani 55' (pen.) |

National Stadium, Singapore
Attendance: 2,000
Referee: Abu Wahid Shanbe (Oman)

11 December 1984
19:00

| China | 5–0 | United Arab Emirates |
|---|---|---|
| Yang Zhaohui 12'; Jia Xiuquan 20'; Zuo Shusheng 36'; Zhao Dayu 52'; Gu Guangming 67' |

National Stadium, Singapore
Attendance: 5,000
Referee: Shizuo Takada (Japan)

== Semi-finals ==
Saudi Arabia defeated Iran on penalties and China defeated Kuwait after extra time to advance to the final.

13 December 1984
20:00

| Saudi Arabia | 1–1 (a.e.t.) | Iran |
|---|---|---|
| Shahin Bayani 88' (o.g.) | | Shahrokh Bayani 43' |
Penalties
| Abdullah (penalty scored); Al-Jawad (penalty scored); Al-Nu'eimeh (penalty scored); Al-Jam'an (penalty scored); Al-Musaibeah (penalty scored) | 5–4 | (penalty scored) Hajiloo; (penalty scored) Mokhtarifar; (penalty scored) Derakhshan; (penalty missed) Panjali; (penalty scored) Shahrokh Bayani |

National Stadium, Singapore
Attendance: 4,769
Referee: George Courtney (England)

14 December 1984
20:00

| China | 1–0 (a.e.t.) | Kuwait |
|---|---|---|
| Li Huayun 108' |

National Stadium, Singapore
Attendance: 9,600
Referee: Augusto Lamo (Spain)

== Third-place play-off ==
After a 1–1 draw, Kuwait defeated Iran 5–3 on penalties to finish third.

16 December 1984
18:00

| Iran | 1–1 (a.e.t.) | Kuwait |
|---|---|---|
| Mohammadkhani 80' | | Al-Haddad 26' |
Penalties
| Hajiloo (penalty scored); Mokhtarifar (penalty missed); Derakhshan (penalty scored); Ahadi (penalty scored) | 3–5 | (penalty scored) Al-Dakhil; (penalty scored) Al-Suwayed; (penalty scored) Al-Mubarak; (penalty scored) Juma'a; (penalty scored) Al-Qabendi |

National Stadium, Singapore
Attendance: 10,000
Referee: Antonio Márquez (Mexico)

== Final ==
Goals from Shaye Al-Nafisah and Majed Abdullah helped Saudi Arabia to a 2–0 win against China as they won the tournament.

16 December 1984
20:00

| Saudi Arabia | 2–0 | China |
|---|---|---|
| Al-Nafisah 10'; Abdullah 46' |

National Stadium, Singapore
Attendance: 26,109
Referee: Shizuo Takada (Japan)

== Goalscorers ==
There were 44 goals scored in 24 matches, for an average of 1.83 goals per match.

3 goals

- (China) Jia Xiuquan
- (Iran) Shahrokh Bayani
- (Iran) Nasser Mohammadkhani

2 goals

- (China) Gu Guangming
- (China) Zhao Dayu
- (Saudi Arabia) Majed Abdullah
- (Singapore) Razali Saad

1 goal

- (China) Li Huayun
- (China) Lin Lefeng
- (China) Yang Zhaohui
- (China) Zuo Shusheng
- (Iran) Hamid Alidousti
- (Iran) Zia Arabshahi
- (Kuwait) Abdullah Al-Buloushi
- (Kuwait) Faisal Al-Dakhil
- (Kuwait) Muayad Al-Haddad
- (Qatar) Ibrahim Khalfan
- (Qatar) Khalid Salman
- (Qatar) Ali Zaid
- (Saudi Arabia) Mohammed Abduljawad
- (Saudi Arabia) Mohaisen Al-Jam'an
- (Saudi Arabia) Shaye Al-Nafisah
- (Saudi Arabia) Saleh Khalifa
- (Singapore) Malek Awab
- (South Korea) Lee Tae-ho
- (Syria) Walid Abu Al-Sel
- (Syria) Radwan Hassan
- (United Arab Emirates) Farooq Abdulrahman
- (United Arab Emirates) Adnan Al-Talyani
- (United Arab Emirates) Fahad Khamees

1 own goal

- (Iran) Shahin Bayani (against Saudi Arabia)
- (Qatar) Ibrahim Al-Rumaihi (against Kuwait)
- (Qatar) Mubarak Anber (against Syria)
- (Syria) Issam Mahrous (against Kuwait)
