= Ahmed Bayazid =

Saudi Arabian footballer

Personal information
- Date of birth: 4 February 1959 (age 67)

International career
Years	Team	Apps	(Gls)
- Saudi Arabia

Ahmed Bayazid (Arabic: أحمد بيزيد; born 4 February 1959) is a Saudi Arabian footballer. He competed in the men's tournament at the 1984 Summer Olympics.
