= Xu Jianping =

Chinese footballer

Xu Jianping 许建平
Personal information
- Full name: Xu Jianping
- Date of birth: 1 February 1955
- Place of birth: Dalian, Liaoning, China
- Date of death: 15 December 2015 (aged 60)
- Place of death: Dalian, Liaoning, China
- Height: 1.80 m (5 ft 11 in)
- Position: Goalkeeper

Senior career*
| Years | Team | Apps | (Gls) |
| 1972–1984 | Liaoning | | |
| 1985– | Dalian | | |
- Tianjin City

International career
| 1980–1986 | China | 17 | (0) |
- * Club domestic league appearances and goals

Xu Jianping (Chinese: 許建平; February 1, 1955- December 15, 2015) was a Chinese international football player. Throughout his career he played for Liaoning and Dalian and represented China in the 1980 AFC Asian Cup.

== Career statistics ==
=== International statistics ===
| Competition | Year | Apps | Goal |
|---|---|---|---|
| Great Wall Cup | 1980-1982 | 2 | 0 |
| Friendly | 1980-1986 | 10 | 0 |
| Asian Games | 1982-1986 | 5 | 0 |
| Total | | 17 | 0 |

== Death ==
On 15 December 2015, Xu Jianping died of stomach cancer in Dalian, aged 60.
