= Gu Guangming =

Chinese footballer and manager

Gu Guangming 古广明
Personal information
- Full name: Gu Guangming
- Date of birth: 31 January 1959 (age 67)
- Place of birth: Shaoguan, Guangdong, China
- Height: 1.68 m (5 ft 6 in)
- Position: Right winger

Youth career
- 1975–1978: Guangdong Junior Team
- 1977–1978: China National Junior Team

Senior career*
Years	Team	Apps	(Gls)
1976–1985	Guangdong team		
1986–1987	TuS Koblenz		
1987–1992	SV Darmstadt 98	107	(8)

International career
1979–1992	China	50	(12)

Managerial career
- 1995–1998: Guangzhou Songri (general manager)
- 2006–2007: Guangzhou Pharmaceutical (general manager)
Medal record
Men's football
Representing China
AFC Asian Cup
Silver medal – second place	1984 Singapore	Team
- * Club domestic league appearances and goals

Gu Guangming (Chinese: 古广明; Chinese: 古廣明; pinyin: Gǔ Guǎngmíng; born 31 January 1959) is a Chinese former professional football player and manager. Nicknamed "The Weatherfish" because of his ability to dribble out of tight spaces on the flanks and in the corners while avoiding tackles, Gu played for the Guangdong provincial team in the semi-professional Chinese Jia League from 1976 to 1985 and became the second Chinese player to play in a European professional league when he played for SV Darmstadt 98 in the German 2. Bundesliga from 1987 to 1992. On the international level, he played for the China national team from 1979 to 1985, participating in the 1982 and the 1986 FIFA World Cup qualifications.

== Playing career ==
Gu was considered a highly talented young player and joined top tier Chinese Jia League side Guangdong provincial team by the 1976 league season. He soon went on to play for the Chinese National Junior Team before Gu went on to see his club win the Chinese league title at the end of the 1979 league season before being called up to the Chinese national team for the first time. With the national team he went on to be in the squads that took part in the 1980 and 1984 AFC Asian Cup third placed team, while also participating in the 1982 and the 1986 FIFA World Cup qualifications.

In 1985, Gu suffered a broken right tibia injury in a domestic match against the Beijing football team, and was forced out of all competitions for almost two years. In 1987, he made a comeback in Germany and played for five seasons with SV Darmstadt 98 in the 2. Bundesliga from 1987 to 1993, becoming the first footballer from the People's Republic of China to play in a European professional league.

== Honours ==
=== Club ===
Guangdong team

- Chinese Jia-A League: 1979

=== Individual ===
- National Best XI: 1980–1983
- AFC All-Star Team: 1985
- Voted "Favorite Football Player in China" by fans: 1986
