= Jasem Bahman =

Kuwaiti football goalkeeper

Personal information
- Date of birth: 15 February 1958 (age 68)
- Place of birth: Kuwait
- Height: 1.78 m (5 ft 10 in)
- Position: Goalkeeper

Senior career*
Years	Team	Apps	(Gls)
1976–1986	Qadsia SC		

International career
1978–1983	Kuwait		
- * Club domestic league appearances and goals

Jasem Bahman (born 15 February 1958) is a Kuwaiti football goalkeeper who played for Kuwait in the 1982 FIFA World Cup. He also played for Qadsia SC.
