= Hong Sung-ho =

South Korean footballer (born 1954)

Personal information
- Full name: 20 December 1954 (age 71)
- Place of birth: South Korea
- Position: Defender

Senior career*
Years	Team	Apps	(Gls)
1978	Hallelujah		
1980	Korean Loyalty		
1981	POSCO		

International career
1978–1981	South Korea	21	(1)
- * Club domestic league appearances and goals

- Hong Sung-ho
- Hangul: 홍성호
- Hanja: 洪性號
- RR: Hong Seongho
- MR: Hong Sŏngho

Hong Sung-ho (born 20 December 1954) is a South Korean football defender who played for South Korea in the 1980 Asian Cup. He also played for Hallelujah FC, Korean Loyalty and POSCO F.C.

== International Record ==
Year	Apps	Goal
1978	3	0
1980	11	0
1981	7	1
Total	21	1
