= Zulkifli Hamzah =

Malaysian footballer

Zulkifli Hamzah (born 17 May 1959) is a Malaysia former footballer who played as a forward for Terengganu and the Malaysia national team.

== Career ==
Zulkifli was born in Kelantan. He was a squad player for Malaysia national team in the 1980 AFC Asian Cup. He scored two goals in that competition, scoring in drawing 1–1 against South Korea and losing 3–1 against Kuwait in the group stage.

He also part of the Malaysian team that qualified to the 1980 Olympic games Moscow which Malaysia boycotted. Malaysia won the play-off against South Korea with a 2–1 score in the Merdeka Stadium.

He was often called the "Young Boy" by fans.

== Personal life ==
Zulkifli is married to Noraini Ismail and they have a son and three daughters.

== Honours ==
Terengganu

- Razak Cup: 1976
- Malaysia Cup runner-up: 1982
- Malaysia Kings Gold Cup: 1987
