= Lin Lefeng =

Chinese footballer

Lin Lefeng 林乐丰
Personal information
- Full name: 林乐丰
- Date of birth: October 16, 1955 (age 71)
- Place of birth: Dalian, Liaoning, China
- Height: 1.80 m (5 ft 11 in)
- Position: Defender

Youth career
- 1972–1973: Liaoning FC

Senior career*
Years	Team	Apps	(Gls)
1974–1977	Liaoning FC		
1986	Shenyang Army		

International career
1977–1985	China	63	(3)

Managerial career
- 1999: Chongqing Hongyan
- 2000: Zhejiang Green Town (team manager)
- 2004: Dalian Shide (caretaker)
- 2006: Dalian Shide (caretaker)
Medal record
Men's football
Representing China
AFC Asian Cup
Silver medal – second place	1984 Singapore	Team
Asian Games
Bronze medal – third place	1978 Bangkok	Football
- * Club domestic league appearances and goals

Lin Lefeng (Chinese: 林乐丰; pinyin: Lín Lèfēng; born October 16, 1955, in Dalian, Liaoning) is a Chinese former international football player. Since retiring he has worked for a number of Chinese football clubs where he has served as a coach, manager, general manager. He was the chairman of Dalian Transcendence and Dalian Yifang.

== Playing career ==
Lin Lefeng started his football career with Liaoning FC before being called up to the Chinese national team where he would establish himself within squad by playing a vital part during the Football at the 1978 Asian Games where he aided the team to a third-place finish. A firm regular within the national team for the next several years his greatest achievement came when he aided the team to a runners-up position at the 1984 AFC Asian Cup where China lost to Saudi Arabia 2-0 in the final. His international career, however would end with great disappointment when China lost 2–1 to Hong Kong in a vital qualifier for the 1986 FIFA World Cup, which knocked China out of the qualification. Lin Lefeng would then move to the Shenyang Army football team before he would end his playing career.

== Management career ==
After his retirement from playing Lin Lefeng would move to Italy to study for his coaching badges before returning to China when in 1998 he would take the management position offered at second tier club Chongqing Hongyan. His reign at leading the club throughout the 1999 league season would turn out to be a disaster when saw the team relegated at the end of the season and he would be dismissed for his poor record at the end of the season. He would take a position as a team leader and coach at the newly formed Zhejiang Green Town for a short period; however, it was when he was offered a position upstairs at Dalian Shide as the deputy general manager did he actually achieve success, winning promotion after promotion until he became the vice president of the club. Leaving after seven years, he would return to Zhejiang Green Town where he was given the deputy general manager position before being promoted to the general manager. One of his first moves would be to hire Zhou Suian as the club's permanent manager; however, this turned out be an unsuccessful move, and Zhou was sacked with Lin Lefeng during the 2009 league season after a string of unsuccessful results. During 2010 Lin would return to his hometown club of Liaoning when he was offered the chance to become the club's vice president. At the beginning of 2016, Lin Lefeng became the chairman of Dalian Transcendence, a newly founded club promoted from China League Two. On July 5, 2016, Lin Lefeng was announced as the new chairman of Dalian Yifang, replacing Shi Xueqing.

In 2017, Lin was employed by Chinese Football Association, Lin worked for the national team management section.
