= Wahiduzzaman Khan Pintu =

Bangladeshi footballer

Pintu
Personal information
- Full name: Wahiduzzaman Khan Pintu
- Place of birth: Barishal, East Pakistan (present-day Bangladesh)
- Position: Goalkeeper

Senior career*
| Years | Team | Apps | (Gls) |
| 1974–1975 | BRTC SC | | |
| 1976–1977 | PWD SC | | |
| 1978 | WAPDA SC | | |
| 1979 | Brothers Union | | |
| 1980 | Mohammedan SC | | |
| 1981 | Team BJMC | | |

International career
| 1977 | Bangladesh U19 | | |
| 1979–1980 | Bangladesh | | |
- * Club domestic league appearances and goals

Wahiduzzaman Khan Pintu (Bengali: ওয়াহিদুজ্জামান খান পিন্টু) is a former Bangladeshi football player who played as a goalkeeper.

== Early life ==
Pintu is the fifth of eight children born to Hashem Ali Khan and Saleha Begum. He grew up Mehendiganj Upazila of Barisal District.

== International career ==
Pintu featured for the Bangladesh U19 team at the 1977 AFC Youth Championship in Iran.

He made his debut for the Bangladesh national team at the 1979 President's Cup held in South Korea.

Pintu also represented Bangladesh at the 1980 AFC Asian Cup held in Kuwait as an understudy to Shahidur Rahman Shantoo. He made two appearances during the tournament. The first was in the opening match, where he substituted for the injured Shantoo in a 2–3 defeat to North Korea. The second appearance was during the final group-stage game, which ended in a 0–6 defeat to China.

His career came to an early end due to a knee injury suffered during practice.

== Post–playing career ==
Pintu, a history major from Dhaka University, was elected its Sports Secretary for two terms and was eventually awarded the Dhaka University Blue award. He also serves as the Election Commissioner of Sonali Otit Club, an organization of former footballers. He previously served as the vice-president of the organization under the presidency of the late Badal Roy. Pintu voted for Badal Roy, at the 2020 Bangladesh Football Federation elections.

== Honours ==
Mohammedan SC

- Dhaka First Division League: 1980

Individual

- Dhaka University Blue: 1979–80

== Bibliography ==
- Mahmud, Dulal (2020). খেলার মাঠে মুক্তিযুদ্ধ (transl. Liberation war in the playground) (in Bengali). Bishhoshahitto Bhobon. ISBN 978-984-8218-31-0.
- Alam, Masud (2017). ফুটবলের গল্প ফুটবলারদের গল্প (transl. The story of football the story of footballers) (in Bengali). Bishhoshahitto Bhobon. ISBN 9789849134688.
- Mahmud, Dulal (2018). আমাদের ফুটবলাররা (transl. Our Footballers) (in Bengali). Agamee Prakashani.
