= Kim Jong-pil (footballer, born 1956) =

South Korean footballer

Personal information
- Date of birth: 16 November 1956 (age 69)
- Place of birth: South Korea
- Position: Defender

Youth career
- 1973–1975: Hanyoung High School

Senior career*
Years	Team	Apps	(Gls)
1976–?	Korea Electronics FC.		

International career
1976	South Korea U-20		
1979–1980	South Korea	2	
- * Club domestic league appearances and goals

- Kim Jong-pil
- Hangul: 김종필
- Hanja: 金鍾弼
- RR: Gim Jongpil
- MR: Kim Chongp'il

Kim Jong-pil (born 26 November 1956) is a South Korean former football defender who played for the national team in the 1980 Asian Cup. He also played for Korea Electronics FC.

== International record ==
Year	Apps	Goal
1980	2	0
Total	2	0
