= Gai Zengchen =

Chinese footballer and coach

Personal information
- Date of birth: 6 April 1955 (age 71)
- Place of birth: Dalian, China
- Position: Striker

Senior career*
Years	Team	Apps	(Gls)
1974–1984	Liaoning FC		

International career
1977–1980	China	1	(0)

Managerial career
- 1995–1996: China U-20 team
- * Club domestic league appearances and goals

Gai Zengchen (Chinese: 盖增臣; born 6 April 1955) is a Chinese football coach and a former international who played for Liaoning FC as well as China in the 1980 Asian Cup.

== Playing career ==
Gai Zengchen was born in Dalian, where he showed great tactical awareness, and was soon snapped up by Liaoning FC. He joined their senior team in the 1974 Chinese league season. His abilities soon saw him called up to the Chinese U-20 team, where he played in the 1975 AFC Youth Championship and helped guide China to a quarter-finals finish. Back with Liaoning, he became a regular within their team as they went on to win the 1978 Chinese league title. During this period, Gai received a call-up to the senior national team and was included in the squad that went to the 1980 Asian Cup.

After spending several more years with Liaoning, he decided to retire in 1984, where he went back to his studies, finishing University. Gai returned to football in 1986 when he went back to Liaoning as a coach, which eventually made him their youth coach from 1989 to 1993. This was followed by a stint at a Chinese high school from 1993 to 1997 and a short period with the Chinese U-20 team.

In 1998, he returned to Liaoning before having a stint with Changchun Yatai in 1999, Dalian Shide F.C. in 2000. From 2002 to 2004, he sided with Shenyang Jinde.

== Personal life ==
Gai Zengchen has three older brothers: Gai Zengsheng, Gai Zengxian, and Gai Zengjun. All four brothers used to be professional football players and are considered one of the most famous brothers in the Chinese football history.

== Career statistics ==
=== International statistics ===
Competition	Year	Apps	Goal
Great Wall Cup	1977	1	0
Asian Cup	1980	0	0
Total		1	0

== Honours ==
=== Player ===
Liaoning FC

- Chinese Jia-A League: 1978
