= Huang Xiangdong =

Chinese footballer and coach

Huang Xiangdong 黄向东
Personal information
- Full name: Huang Xiangdong
- Date of birth: 22 March 1958 (age 68)
- Place of birth: Dalian, Liaoning, China
- Position: Striker

Senior career*
Years	Team	Apps	(Gls)
1972–1985	Kunming Army Unit		
1986–1987	Bayi Football Team		
1988	Locomotive		

International career
1979–1982	China	19	(8)

Managerial career
- 2010: Wenzhou Provenza
- 2016: Hunan Billows (caretaker)
- * Club domestic league appearances and goals

Huang Xiangdong (Chinese: 黄向东 born 22 March 1958 in Dalian) is a Chinese football coach and a former international player. In his football career he represented the Kunming Army Unit, Bayi Football Team and Locomotive while internationally he played for China in the 1980 Asian Cup and 1982 FIFA World Cup qualification campaign. Since retiring he has moved into coaching with his last appointment being with Chinese league two club Wenzhou Provenza in their 2010 league campaign.

== Career statistics ==
=== International statistics ===
Competition	Year	Apps	Goal
Great Wall Cup	1980	1	0
Friendly	1980-1982	5	2
Asian Games	1982	4	1
1982 FIFA World Cup qualification (AFC and OFC)	1980-1982	9	5
Total		19	8

== Honours ==
=== Player ===
Bayi Football Team

- Chinese Jia-A League: 1986
