= Nassir Al-Ghanem =

Kuwaiti footballer

Nasser Al-Ghanem
Personal information
- Date of birth: 4 April 1961 (age 65)
- Place of birth: Kuwait
- Position: Midfielder

Senior career*
Years	Team	Apps	(Gls)
1978–1992	Kazma Sporting Club		

International career
1979–1991	Kuwait		
- * Club domestic league appearances and goals

Nasser Al-Ghanem (born 4 April 1961) is a former Kuwaiti football midfielder who played for Kuwait in the 1982 FIFA World Cup, he also played for Kazma Sporting Club.
