= Football at the 1986 Asian Games – Men's team squads =

Squads for the Football at the 1986 Asian Games played in Seoul, South Korea.

== Group A ==
=== Iraq ===
Coach: Akram Salman

No.	Pos.	Player	Date of birth (age)	Club
	GK	Ahmad Jassim	4 May 1960 (aged 26)	(Iraq Football Association) Al-Rasheed
	GK	Samir Abdul-Ridha	1 July 1960 (aged 26)	(Iraq Football Association)
	GK	Suhail Saber	1 June 1962 (aged 24)	(Iraq Football Association) Al-Rasheed
	DF	Adnan Dirjal	26 January 1960 (aged 26)	(Iraq Football Association) Al-Rasheed
	DF	Khamis Humoud		(Iraq Football Association)
	DF	Salam Hashim	7 October 1966 (aged 19)	(Iraq Football Association) Al-Rasheed
	DF	Khalil Allawi	6 September 1958 (aged 28)	(Iraq Football Association) Al-Rasheed
	DF	Karim Allawi	1 April 1960 (aged 26)	(Iraq Football Association) Al-Rasheed
	DF	Mudhafar Jabbar	11 January 1965 (aged 21)	(Iraq Football Association)
	DF	Ghanim Oraibi	16 August 1961 (aged 25)	(Iraq Football Association) Al-Shabab
	DF	Jalal Shaker		(Iraq Football Association)
	MF	Sadiq Mousa	20 October 1959 (aged 26)	(Iraq Football Association) Al-Jaish
	MF	Haris Mohammed	3 March 1958 (aged 28)	(Iraq Football Association) Al-Rasheed
	MF	Shaker Mahmoud	5 May 1960 (aged 26)	(Iraq Football Association) Al-Shabab
	MF	Basil Gorgis	15 January 1961 (aged 25)	(Iraq Football Association) Al-Shabab
	MF	Ali Hussein	5 May 1961 (aged 25)	(Iraq Football Association) Al-Talaba
	FW	Hussein Saeed	21 January 1958 (aged 28)	(Iraq Football Association) Al-Talaba
	FW	Rahim Hameed	23 May 1963 (aged 23)	(Iraq Football Association) Al-Jaish
	FW	Laith Hussein	13 October 1968 (aged 17)	(Iraq Football Association) Al-Zawraa
	FW	Ahmed Radhi	21 March 1964 (aged 22)	(Iraq Football Association) Al-Rasheed

=== Oman ===
Coach:Karl Heinz Heddergott (West Germany)

No.	Pos.	Player	Date of birth (age)	Club
1	GK	Suleiman Khayef		
15	GK	Obaid Yousuf Al Zakwani		
16	GK	Mohammed Abdullah Mansour		
17	DF	Ibrahim Haikal		
2	DF	Saif Al Habsi		
3	DF	Ahmed Ali		
5	MF	Said Faraj		
4	DF	Ahmed Thabet		
6	MF	Ghulam Khamis		
7	MF	Noor Abdul Tayib Al Farsi		
8	MF	Matar Khalifa		
9	MF	Saeed Shaban		
10	FW	Younis Amaan		
11	FW	Hilal Humeid		
12	DF	Hamdan Nasser Hamed		
13	MF	Abdullah Kamona		
14	FW	Salem Rajab		

=== Pakistan ===
Coach: Tariq Lutfi

No.	Pos.	Player	Date of birth (age)	Club
	GK	Jamshed Rana	1 June 1965 (aged 21)	(Pakistan Football Federation) Pakistan Airlines
	DF	Muhammad Naveed (c)		(Pakistan Football Federation) Pakistan Army
	DF	Zafar Iqbal	3 February 1965 (aged 21)	(Pakistan Football Federation) Pakistan Airlines
	DF	Mukhtar Ali	25 July 1962 (aged 24)	(Pakistan Football Federation) Pakistan Airlines
	DF	Arbab Hayat Shahzada	22 January 1959 (aged 27)	(Pakistan Football Federation)
	DF	Samuel Gill	5 May 1959 (aged 27)	(Pakistan Football Federation) Lahore Division
	MF	Fida Ur Rehman	7 April 1962 (aged 24)	(Pakistan Football Federation) Pakistan Airlines
	MF	Abdul Samad	1964	(Pakistan Football Federation)
	MF	Ejaz Ali	5 November 1963 (aged 22)	(Pakistan Football Federation) Pakistan Airlines
	MF	Abdul Wahid	9 October 1965 (aged 20)	(Pakistan Football Federation) Pakistan Airlines
	MF	Abdul Majeed	12 November 1966 (aged 19)	(Pakistan Football Federation) Pakistan Airlines
	MF	Syed Muhammad Saifullah	2 August 1965 (aged 21)	(Pakistan Football Federation)
	FW	Ghulam Sarwar Teddy	2 February 1962 (aged 24)	(Pakistan Football Federation) Pakistan Airlines
		Abdul Rehman		(Pakistan Football Federation) Karachi Port Trust
		Zakir Hussain		(Pakistan Football Federation)
		Athar Hussain		(Pakistan Football Federation)

=== Thailand ===
Coach: (West Germany) Burkhard Ziese

No.	Pos.	Player	Date of birth (age)	Club
	GK			
	DF			
	DF			
	MF			
	DF			
	MF	Witthaya Laohakul	1 February 1954 (aged 32)	(Japan Football Association) Matsushita
	FW	Piyapong Pue-on	14 November 1959 (aged 26)	(Korea Football Association) Lucky Goldstar FC
	FW			
	FW			
	FW			
	FW			

=== United Arab Emirates ===
Coach:

No.	Pos.	Player	Date of birth (age)	Club
	GK			
	DF			
	DF			
	MF			
	DF			
	MF			
	FW			
	FW			
	FW			
	FW			
	FW			

== Group B ==
=== Bahrain ===
Coach: (England) Robbie Stepney

No.	Pos.	Player	Date of birth (age)	Club
22	GK	Mohamed Saleh Ali Bubshait		
18		Abdul Karim Saif		
4		Juma Hilal Faraj		
5		Adnan Daif		(Bahrain Football Association) Al-Muharraq SC
12		Marjan Eid		
8		Abdulrahman Hisham Abdullah		
13		Ali Yousif Bushagor		
16		Rashid Hassan Abdul Rahman		
15		Khamis Eid		(Bahrain Football Association) West Riffa SC
17		Abdul Latif Jaffer Hussain		
14		Ali Hassan Yousif		

=== China PR ===
Coach: Nian Weisi

No.	Pos.	Player	Date of birth (age)	Club
1	GK	Xu Jianping		
2	DF	Zhu Bo		
3	MF	Gao Sheng		
4	MF	Lü Hongxiang		
5	DF	Jia Xiuquan		
6		Chen Dong		
8	FW	Tang Yaodong		
9	FW	Liu Haiguang		
10	FW	Ma Lin		
11	DF	Liu Zhongchang	1986 (age 39–40)	
14	FW	Shen Xiangfu		
15	MF	Qin Guorong		
16	FW	Li Hui		
17		Guo Yijun		
18	MF	Duan Ju		
20	DF	Mai Chao		

=== India ===
Coach: P. K. Banerjee

No.	Pos.	Player	Date of birth (age)	Club
	GK	Atanu Bhattacharya		(All India Football Federation) Bengal
	GK	Brahmanand Sankhwalkar	6 March 1954 (aged 32)	(All India Football Federation) Salgaocar
	DF	Aloke Mukherjee	1 May 1960 (aged 26)	(All India Football Federation) Bengal
	DF	Tarun Dey		(All India Football Federation) Bengal
	DF	Sudip Chatterjee (c)	5 February 1959 (aged 27)	(All India Football Federation) East Bengal
	DF	Krishnendu Roy		(All India Football Federation) Bengal
	DF	V. P. Sathyan	29 April 1965 (aged 21)	(All India Football Federation) Kerala Police
	DF	Derrick Pereira	17 March 1962 (aged 24)	(All India Football Federation) Goa
	DF	Charanjit Singh		(All India Football Federation) Punjab State Electricity Board
	MF	Bikash Panji		(All India Football Federation) East Bengal
	MF	Mauricio Afonso	16 November 1961 (aged 24)	(All India Football Federation) Dempo
	MF	Prasanta Banerjee	12 February 1958 (aged 28)	(All India Football Federation) Bengal
	MF	Debashish Mishra		(All India Football Federation) East Bengal
	FW	Krishanu Dey	14 February 1962 (aged 24)	(All India Football Federation) East Bengal
	FW	Camilo Gonsalves		(All India Football Federation) Goa
	FW	Babu Mani		(All India Football Federation) Bengal
	FW	Biswajit Bhattacharya		(All India Football Federation) East Bengal
	FW	Sisir Ghosh		(All India Football Federation) Bengal

=== South Korea ===
Coach: Kim Jung-nam

No.	Pos.	Player	Date of birth (age)	Club
1	GK	Cho Byung-deuk	26 May 1958 (aged 28)	(Korea Football Association) Hallelujah
2	DF	Park Kyung-hoon	19 January 1961 (aged 25)	(Korea Football Association) POSCO Atoms
3	DF	Chung Jong-soo	27 March 1961 (aged 25)	(Korea Football Association) Yukong Elephants
4	MF	Cho Kwang-rae	19 March 1954 (aged 32)	(Korea Football Association) Daewoo Royals
5	DF	Chung Yong-hwan	10 February 1960 (aged 26)	(Korea Football Association) Daewoo Royals
6	MF	Lee Tae-ho	29 January 1961 (aged 25)	(Korea Football Association) Daewoo Royals
7	MF	Kang Deuk-soo	16 August 1961 (aged 25)	(Korea Football Association) Lucky-Goldstar Hwangso
8	MF	Cho Young-jeung	18 August 1954 (aged 32)	(Korea Football Association) Lucky-Goldstar Hwangso
9	FW	Choi Soon-ho	10 January 1962 (aged 24)	(Korea Football Association) POSCO Atoms
10	MF	Park Chang-sun	2 February 1954 (aged 32)	(Korea Football Association) Daewoo Royals
11	FW	Byun Byung-joo	26 April 1961 (aged 25)	(Korea Football Association) Daewoo Royals
12	DF	Kim Pyung-seok	29 September 1958 (aged 27)	(Korea Football Association) Hyundai Horangi
13	FW	Noh Soo-jin	10 February 1962 (aged 24)	(Korea Football Association) Yukong Elephants
14	MF	Cho Min-kook	5 July 1963 (aged 23)	(Korea Football Association) Lucky-Goldstar Hwangso
15	DF	Yoo Byung-ok	2 March 1964 (aged 22)	(Korea Football Association) Hanyang University
16	MF	Kim Joo-sung	17 January 1966 (aged 20)	(Korea Football Association) Chosun University
17	MF	Huh Jung-moo	13 January 1955 (aged 31)	(Korea Football Association) Hyundai Horangi
18	MF	Kim Sam-soo	8 February 1963 (aged 23)	(Korea Football Association) Hyundai Horangi
19	GK	Lee Moon-young	5 May 1965 (aged 21)	(Korea Football Association) Seoul FC
20	FW	Kim Yong-se	21 April 1960 (aged 26)	(Korea Football Association) Yukong Elephants

== Group C ==
=== Indonesia ===
Coach: Bertje Matulapelwa

No.	Pos.	Player	Date of birth (age)	Club
1	GK	I Gede Putu Yasa	01 January 1961 (aged 25)	(Football Association of Indonesia) Persebaya Surabaya
2	DF	Jaya Hartono	20 October 1963 (aged 23)	(Football Association of Indonesia) Niac Mitra
3	DF	Sutrisno	20 August 1962 (aged 24)	(Football Association of Indonesia) PSMS Medan
4	MF	Patar Tambunan	11 July 1965 (aged 21)	(Football Association of Indonesia) Persija Jakarta
5	DF	Marzuki Nyak Mad	17 July 1964 (aged 22)	(Football Association of Indonesia) Persija Jakarta
6	DF	Robby Darwis	30 October 1964 (aged 22)	(Football Association of Indonesia) Persib Bandung
7	MF	Elly Idris	04 November 1962 (aged 24)	(Football Association of Indonesia) Pelita Jaya Jakarta
8	MF	Zulkarnain Lubis	21 December 1958 (aged 27)	(Football Association of Indonesia) KTB Palembang
9	FW	Ricky Yacobi	12 March 1963 (aged 23)	(Football Association of Indonesia) Arseto Solo
10	MF	Herry Kiswanto	25 April 1955 (aged 31)	(Football Association of Indonesia) KTB Palembang
11	FW	Adolf Kabo	03 March 1960 (aged 26)	(Football Association of Indonesia) Perseman Manokwari
12	DF	Berti Tutuarima	09 December 1957 (aged 28)	(Football Association of Indonesia) Persija Jakarta
13	FW	Yonas Sawor	3 July 1962 (aged 24)	(Football Association of Indonesia) Perseman Manokwari
14	FW	Adityo Darmadi	12 November 1961 (aged 25)	(Football Association of Indonesia) Persija Jakarta
15	DF	Abdulrahman Gurning	15 February 1958 (aged 28)	(Football Association of Indonesia) PSMS Medan
16	GK	Asmawi Djambak	12 February 1959 (aged 27)	(Football Association of Indonesia) Arseto Solo
17	MF	Saut L. Tobing	25 January 1962 (aged 24)	(Football Association of Indonesia) KTB Palembang
18	DF	Sumardi		(Football Association of Indonesia) PSMS Medan
19	DF	Robby Maruanaya		(Football Association of Indonesia) Pelita Jaya Jakarta
20	GK	Ponirin Meka	02 February 1956 (aged 30)	(Football Association of Indonesia) PSMS Medan

=== Qatar ===
Coach:

No.	Pos.	Player	Date of birth (age)	Club
	GK			
	DF	Mohammed Daham Al-Suwaidi		(Qatar Football Association)
	DF			
	MF			
	DF			
	MF			
	FW			
	FW	Mana Saud Al-Bishi		(Qatar Football Association)
	FW			
	FW			
	FW			

=== Malaysia ===
Coach: (Czechoslovakia) Josef Venglos

No.	Pos.	Player	Date of birth (age)	Club
	GK	R. Arumugam	31 January 1953 (aged 33)	(Football Association of Malaysia) Selangor FA
	GK	Ong Yu Tiang	27 October 1958 (aged 27)	(Football Association of Malaysia) Pahang FA
	DF	Serbegeth Singh	20 August 1960 (aged 26)	(Football Association of Malaysia) Kuala Lumpur FA
	DF	Kamarulzaman Yusof		(Football Association of Malaysia) Selangor FA
	DF	Razip Ismail	23 April 1962 (aged 24)	(Football Association of Malaysia) Kuala Lumpur FA
	DF	Khan Hung Meng		(Football Association of Malaysia) Pahang FA
	DF	K. Gunalan		(Football Association of Malaysia) Selangor FA
	MF	Lim Teong Kim	26 August 1963 (aged 22)	(Football Association of Malaysia) Kuala Lumpur FA
	MF	Wong Hung Nung	1958 (aged 28)	(Football Association of Malaysia) Selangor FA
	MF	Nasir Yusof	17 March 1961 (aged 25)	(Football Association of Malaysia) Johor FA
	MF	Ahmad Yusof	08 August 1960 (aged 26)	(Football Association of Malaysia) Pahang FA
	MF	Muhamad Radhi Mat Din	17 July 1965 (aged 21)	(Football Association of Malaysia) Kedah FA
	MF	P. Dharmalingam		(Football Association of Malaysia) Selangor FA
	MF	Azhar Shariff		(Football Association of Malaysia) Selangor FA
	FW	Dollah Salleh	10 October 1963 (aged 22)	(Football Association of Malaysia) Johor FA
	FW	Zainal Abidin Hassan	09 November 1961 (aged 24)	(Football Association of Malaysia) Selangor FA
	FW	Saidin Osman		(Football Association of Malaysia) Kuala Lumpur FA
	FW	Subadron "Super" Aziz		(Football Association of Malaysia) Kuala Lumpur FA

=== Saudi Arabia ===
Coach: (Brazil) Carlos José Castilho

No.	Pos.	Player	Date of birth (age)	Club
1	GK	Salem Marwan	1 July 1958 (aged 28)	(Saudi Arabian Football Federation) Al-Nassr
2	DF	Abdulrahman Al-Tekhaifi		(Saudi Arabian Football Federation) Al-Hilal
3	DF	Hussein Al-Bishi	13 June 1961 (aged 25)	(Saudi Arabian Football Federation) Al-Hilal
4	DF	Abdulrahman Al-Roomi	28 October 1969 (aged 16)	(Saudi Arabian Football Federation) Al-Shabab
5	DF	Saleh Al-Nu'eimeh	24 July 1960 (aged 26)	(Saudi Arabian Football Federation) Al-Hilal
6	MF	Fahad Al-Bishi	10 September 1965 (aged 21)	(Saudi Arabian Football Federation) Al-Nassr
7	MF	Shaye Al-Nafisah	30 March 1962 (aged 24)	(Saudi Arabian Football Federation) Al-Kawkab
8	FW	Mohammed Al-Shahrani		(Saudi Arabian Football Federation) Al-Ittihad
9	FW	Majed Abdullah	1 November 1959 (aged 26)	(Saudi Arabian Football Federation) Al-Nassr
10	FW	Fahad Al-Musaibeah	4 April 1961 (aged 25)	(Saudi Arabian Football Federation) Al-Hilal
11	MF	Mohaisen Al-Jam'an	6 April 1966 (aged 20)	(Saudi Arabian Football Federation) Al-Nassr
12	MF	Ismail Hakami	6 August 1966 (aged 20)	(Saudi Arabian Football Federation) Al-Ittihad
13	DF	Mohammed Abduljawad	28 November 1962 (aged 23)	(Saudi Arabian Football Federation) Al-Ahli
14	MF	Saleh Khalifa Al-Dosari	2 May 1954 (aged 32)	(Saudi Arabian Football Federation) Al-Ahli
15	FW	Yousuf Al-Thunayan	18 November 1963 (aged 22)	(Saudi Arabian Football Federation) Al-Hilal
20	FW	Abadi Al-Hathlool	20 October 1964 (aged 21)	(Saudi Arabian Football Federation) Al-Hilal
	GK	Sameer Sulaimani		
	DF	Basem Abu Dawood		

== Group D ==
=== Bangladesh ===
Coach: Golam Sarwar Tipu

No.	Pos.	Player	Date of birth (age)	Club
	GK	Mohamed Mohsin	1 August 1965 (aged 21)	(Bangladesh Football Federation) Mohammedan SC
	GK	Sayeed Hassan Kanan	15 February 1964 (aged 22)	(Bangladesh Football Federation) Mohammedan SC
	DF	Monem Munna	9 June 1966 (aged 20)	(Bangladesh Football Federation) Brothers Union
	DF	Imtiaz Sultan Johnny	15 September 1961 (aged 25)	(Bangladesh Football Federation) Abahani Krira Chakra
	DF	Nazir Ahmed Alok	1 December 1960 (aged 25)	(Bangladesh Football Federation) Mohammedan SC
	DF	Kaiser Hamid	1 December 1964 (aged 21)	(Bangladesh Football Federation) Mohammedan SC
	DF	Ranjit Saha	15 January 1964 (aged 22)	(Bangladesh Football Federation) Mohammedan SC
	DF	Shafiqul Islam Manik	21 August 1961 (aged 25)	(Bangladesh Football Federation) Mohammedan SC
	MF	Khurshid Alam Babul (c)	1 March 1955 (aged 31)	(Bangladesh Football Federation) Abahani Krira Chakra
	MF	Elias Hossain	10 October 1962 (aged 23)	(Bangladesh Football Federation) Mohammedan SC
	MF	Ashish Bhadra	14 March 1960 (aged 26)	(Bangladesh Football Federation) Abahani Krira Chakra
	MF	Fakrul Islam Kamal	1 July 1965 (aged 21)	(Bangladesh Football Federation) Abahani Krira Chakra
	MF	Satyajit Das Rupu	5 September 1964 (aged 22)	(Bangladesh Football Federation) Abahani Krira Chakra
	MF	Mahfuzul Mamun Babu	7 January 1968 (aged 18)	(Bangladesh Football Federation) Brothers Union
	FW	Wasim Iqbal	21 November 1961 (aged 24)	(Bangladesh Football Federation) Brothers Union
	FW	Sheikh Mohammad Aslam	1 March 1958 (aged 28)	(Bangladesh Football Federation) Abahani Krira Chakra
	FW	Samrat Hossain Emily	16 June 1966 (aged 20)	(Bangladesh Football Federation) Mohammedan SC
	FW	Shahinur Kabir Shimul		(Bangladesh Football Federation) Muktijoddha Sangsad

=== Iran ===
Coach: Parviz Dehdari

No.	Pos.	Player	Date of birth (age)	Club
1	GK	Ahmad Sajjadi		(Football Federation Islamic Republic of Iran) Homa F.C.
22	GK	Majid Rezaei		(Football Federation Islamic Republic of Iran) Esteghlal F.C.
2	DF	Asghar Hajiloo		(Football Federation Islamic Republic of Iran) Esteghlal F.C.
3	DF	Shahin Bayani		(Football Federation Islamic Republic of Iran) Esteghlal F.C.
5	DF	Mohammad Panjali		(Football Federation Islamic Republic of Iran) Perspolis F.C.
23	DF	Morteza Fonounizadeh		(Football Federation Islamic Republic of Iran) Perspolis F.C.
24	DF	Siamak Rahimpour		(Football Federation Islamic Republic of Iran) Shahin Tehran F.C.
19	DF	Hossein Mesgar Saravi		(Football Federation Islamic Republic of Iran) F.C. Nassaji Mazandaran
9	MF	Mehdi Abtahi		(Football Federation Islamic Republic of Iran) Vahdat F.C.
6	MF	Shahrokh Bayani		(Football Federation Islamic Republic of Iran) Perspolis F.C.
7	MF	Majid Namjoo-Motlagh		(Football Federation Islamic Republic of Iran) Esteghlal F.C.
25	MF	Sirous Ghayeghran		(Football Federation Islamic Republic of Iran) Malavan F.C.
10	MF	Karim Bavi		(Football Federation Islamic Republic of Iran) Perspolis F.C.
	MF	Hamid Derakhshan		(Football Federation Islamic Republic of Iran) Perspolis F.C.
20	MF	Zia Arabshahi		(Football Federation Islamic Republic of Iran) Perspolis F.C.
8	FW	Nasser Mohammadkhani		(Football Federation Islamic Republic of Iran) Perspolis F.C.
15	FW	Abdolali Changiz		(Football Federation Islamic Republic of Iran) Esteghlal F.C.
16	FW	Morteza Yekkeh		(Football Federation Islamic Republic of Iran) Esteghlal F.C.
13	FW	Gholamreza Fathabadi		(Football Federation Islamic Republic of Iran) Perspolis F.C.
	FW	Farshad Pious		(Football Federation Islamic Republic of Iran) Perspolis F.C.

=== Japan ===
Coach: Yoshinobu Ishii

No.	Pos.	Player	Date of birth (age)	Club
1	GK	Kiyotaka Matsui	04 January 1961 (aged 25)	(Japan Football Association) NKK SC
2	DF	Hisashi Kato (C)	24 April 1956 (aged 30)	(Japan Football Association) Verdy Kawasaki
3	DF	Yoshinori Ishigami	04 November 1957 (aged 28)	(Japan Football Association) Yamaha Motors
4	DF	Yasutaro Matsuki	28 November 1957 (aged 28)	(Japan Football Association) Yomiuri
5	DF	Hisashi Kaneko	12 September 1959 (aged 26)	(Japan Football Association) Furukawa Electric
6	DF	Satoshi Tsunami	14 August 1961 (aged 24)	(Japan Football Association) Verdy Kawasaki
7	DF	Takumi Horiike	06 September 1965 (aged 20)	(Japan Football Association) Juntendo University
8	MF	Akihiro Nishimura	08 August 1958 (aged 27)	(Japan Football Association) Yammer Diesel
9	MF	Satoshi Miyauchi	26 November 1959 (aged 26)	(Japan Football Association) Furukawa Electric
10	FW	Kazushi Kimura	19 July 1958 (aged 28)	(Japan Football Association) Yokohama Marinos
11	MF	Kazuo Echigo	28 December 1965 (aged 20)	(Japan Football Association) Furukawa Electric
12	FW	Toshio Matsuura	20 November 1955 (aged 30)	(Japan Football Association) NKK SC
13	FW	Satoshi Tezuka	4 September 1958 (aged 28)	(Japan Football Association) Fujita Industries
14	FW	Hiromi Hara	19 October 1958 (aged 27)	(Japan Football Association) Mitsubishi Motors
15	FW	Koichi Hashiratani	1 March 1961 (aged 25)	(Japan Football Association) Nissan Motors
16	DF	Yasuharu Kurata	1 February 1963 (aged 23)	(Japan Football Association) Honda FC
17	FW	Osamu Taninaka	24 September 1964 (aged 21)	(Japan Football Association) Fujita Industries
18	DF	Toshinobu Katsuya	2 September 1961 (aged 25)	(Japan Football Association) Honda FC
19	GK	Shinichi Morishita	28 December 1960 (aged 25)	(Japan Football Association) Júbilo Iwata
20	MF	Yasuhiko Okudera	12 March 1952 (aged 34)	(German Football Association) Werder Bremen

=== Kuwait ===
Coach: (Hungary) György Mezey

No.	Pos.	Player	Date of birth (age)	Club
1	GK	Khaled Al-Shemmari		(Kuwait Football Association) Kazma
3	DF	Wael Sulaiman	8 August 1964 (aged 22)	(Kuwait Football Association) Al-Jahra
4	DF	Jamal Al-Qabendi	7 April 1959 (aged 27)	(Kuwait Football Association) Kazma
5	DF	Waleed Al-Jasem	18 November 1959 (aged 26)	(Kuwait Football Association) Al-Kuwait
9	FW	Salah Al-Hasawi	1 January 1963 (aged 23)	(Kuwait Football Association) Al-Kuwait
12	FW	Yussef Al-Suwayed	20 September 1958 (aged 28)	(Kuwait Football Association) Kazma
20	FW	Muayad Al-Haddad	30 March 1960 (aged 26)	(Kuwait Football Association) Al-Qadsia
	GK	Samir Said		
	DF	Hamoud Al-Shemmari		
	DF	Naeem Saad		
	DF	Sami Al-Hashash		
	MF	Adil Abbas		
	MF	Abdulaziz Al-Buloushi		
	MF	Nasser Al-Ghanim		
	MF	Khalid Sharida		
	MF	Abdulaziz Al-Hajeri		
	FW	Abdulaziz Al-Anberi		
	FW	Jabir Al-Zanki		

=== Nepal ===
Coach:

No.	Pos.	Player	Date of birth (age)	Club
1	GK	Lok Bahadur Shahi		
2		Dhirendra Pradhan		
3		Ganesh Pandhi		
4		Umesh Pradhan		
5		Man Bahadur Malla		
6		Mani Bickram Shah		
7		Kedar Manandhar		
8		Ganesh Thapa		
9		YB Ghale		
10		Anil Bandhu Rupakheti		
11		Bigyan Sharma		
12		Gyanu Raja Shrestha		
13	FW	Poonam Thapa		
