= Football at the 1990 Asian Games – Men's team squads =

Below are the squads for the men's football tournament at the 1990 Asian Games, played in Beijing, China.

== Group A ==
=== China ===
Coach: (China) Gao Fengwen

No.	Pos.	Player	Date of birth (age)	Club
1	GK	Fu Yubin	9 August 1963 (aged 27)	(Chinese Football Association) Liaoning
2	DF	Zhu Bo	24 September 1960 (aged 29)	(Chinese Football Association) Bayi
3	MF	Gao Sheng	10 May 1962 (aged 28)	(Chinese Football Association) Liaoning
4	DF	Guo Yijun	23 September 1963 (aged 26)	(Chinese Football Association) Guangdong
5	DF	Jia Xiuquan	9 November 1963 (aged 26)	(Chinese Football Association) Bayi
6	MF	Wu Qunli	20 March 1960 (aged 30)	(Chinese Football Association) Guangzhou
7	MF	Xie Yuxin	12 October 1968 (aged 21)	(Chinese Football Association) Guangdong
8	FW	Tang Yaodong	17 February 1962 (aged 28)	(Chinese Football Association) Liaoning
9	FW	Liu Haiguang	11 July 1963 (aged 27)	(Chinese Football Association) Shanghai
10	FW	Ma Lin	28 July 1962 (aged 28)	(Chinese Football Association) Liaoning
11	MF	Ju Lijin	31 January 1966 (aged 24)	(Chinese Football Association) Shanghai
12	FW	Wang Baoshan	13 April 1963 (aged 27)	(Chinese Football Association) Shaanxi
13	MF	Li Hongbing	10 August 1965 (aged 25)	(Chinese Football Association) Jiangsu
14	MF	Zhao Faqing	3 January 1964 (aged 26)	(Chinese Football Association) Liaoning
17	DF	Mai Chao	9 March 1964 (aged 26)	(Chinese Football Association) Guangdong
18	MF	Duan Ju	31 August 1963 (aged 27)	(Chinese Football Association) Tianjin
19	FW	Wang Tao	9 April 1967 (aged 23)	(Chinese Football Association) Beijing
20	GK	Zhang Huikang	22 July 1962 (aged 28)	(Chinese Football Association) Shanghai

=== Pakistan ===
Coach: (China) Wang Xiao He

No.	Pos.	Player	Date of birth (age)	Club
	GK	Mateen Akhtar	3 March 1962 (aged 28)	(Pakistan Football Federation) WAPDA
	GK	Jamshed Rana	1 June 1965 (aged 25)	(Pakistan Football Federation) Pakistan Airlines
	DF	Zafar Iqbal	3 February 1965 (aged 25)	(Pakistan Football Federation) Pakistan Airlines
	DF	Muhammad Saleem Awan	1 January 1961 (aged 29)	(Pakistan Football Federation) WAPDA
	DF	Haji Abdul Sattar	6 February 1965 (aged 25)	(Pakistan Football Federation) Pakistan Army
	MF	Ejaz Ali	5 November 1963 (aged 26)	(Pakistan Football Federation) Pakistan Airlines
	MF	Shaukat Ali	12 March 1964 (aged 26)	(Pakistan Football Federation) Pakistan Army
	MF	Shabbir Hussain	13 March 1965 (aged 25)	(Pakistan Football Federation) WAPDA
	MF	Sadiq Ali	9 December 1973 (aged 16)	(Pakistan Football Federation)
	MF	Amjad Ali	27 October 1967 (aged 22)	(Pakistan Football Federation)
	MF	Fida Ur Rehman	27 April 1962 (aged 28)	(Pakistan Football Federation) Pakistan Airlines
	MF	Abdul Majeed	12 November 1966 (aged 23)	(Pakistan Football Federation) Pakistan Airlines
	FW	Saleem Patni	10 April 1968 (aged 22)	(Pakistan Football Federation) Pakistan Airlines
	FW	Sharafat Ali	1 June 1966 (aged 24)	(Pakistan Football Federation) WAPDA
	FW	Zahid Luqman	9 December 1974 (aged 15)	(Pakistan Football Federation)
	FW	Qazi Ashfaq	12 December 1967 (aged 22)	(Pakistan Football Federation) WAPDA

=== Singapore ===
Coach: Robin Chan

No.	Pos.	Player	Date of birth (age)	Club
1	GK	David Lee	10 April 1958 (aged 32)	(Football Association of Singapore) Singapore
2	MF	Sudiat Dali	25 February 1962 (aged 28)	(Football Association of Singapore) Singapore
3	FW	Fandi Ahmad	26 May 1962 (aged 28)	(Hellenic Football Federation) OFI Crete
5	DF	Abdullah Borhan	20 January 1965 (aged 25)	
6	MF	Nazri Nasir	17 January 1971 (aged 19)	(Football Association of Singapore) Jurong Town
7	MF	D. Tokijan	14 February 1963 (aged 27)	(Football Association of Singapore) Jurong Town
8	MF	Yahya Madon	17 October 1964 (aged 25)	(Football Association of Singapore) Police
11	MF	Malek Awab	11 January 1961 (aged 29)	(Football Association of Malaysia) Kuala Lumpur
15	DF	Terry Pathmanathan	9 February 1956 (aged 34)	(Football Association of Singapore) Singapore
16	FW	Zulkifli Kartoyoho	21 April 1964 (aged 26)	(Football Association of Singapore) Police
17	MF	Hasnim Haron	21 December 1966 (aged 23)	(Football Association of Singapore) Singapore
18	FW	V. Sundramoorthy	6 October 1965 (aged 24)	(Football Association of Malaysia) Kedah
19	MF	Yusoff Taib	14 November 1962 (aged 27)	(Football Association of Singapore) Police
	MF	Abdullah Noor	5 June 1961 (aged 29)	

=== South Korea ===
Coach: (South Korea) Park Jong-hwan

No.	Pos.	Player	Date of birth (age)	Club
1	GK	Choi In-young	5 March 1962 (aged 28)	(Korea Football Association) Hyundai Horangi
2	DF	Park Kyung-hoon	19 January 1961 (aged 29)	(Korea Football Association) POSCO Atoms
3	DF	Chung Jong-soo	27 March 1961 (aged 29)	(Korea Football Association) Yukong Elephants
4	DF	Yoon Deok-yeo	25 March 1961 (aged 29)	(Korea Football Association) Hyundai Horangi
5	DF	Chung Yong-hwan	10 February 1960 (aged 30)	(Korea Football Association) Daewoo Royals
6	MF	Kim Sang-ho	5 October 1964 (aged 25)	(Korea Football Association) POSCO Atoms
7	MF	Lee Young-jin	27 October 1963 (aged 26)	(Korea Football Association) Lucky-Goldstar Hwangso
8	DF	Kim Pan-keun	5 March 1966 (aged 24)	(Korea Football Association) Daewoo Royals
9	MF	Hwangbo Kwan	1 March 1965 (aged 25)	(Korea Football Association) Yukong Elephants
10	MF	Kim Joo-sung	17 January 1966 (aged 24)	(Korea Football Association) Daewoo Royals
11	FW	Byun Byung-joo	26 April 1961 (aged 29)	(Korea Football Association) Hyundai Horangi
12	MF	Noh Jung-yoon	28 March 1971 (aged 19)	(Korea Football Association) Korea University
13	DF	Jung Kwang-seok	1 December 1970 (aged 19)	(Korea Football Association) Sungkyunkwan University
14	FW	Choi Soon-ho	10 January 1962 (aged 28)	(Korea Football Association) Lucky-Goldstar Hwangso
15	GK	Kim Poong-joo	1 October 1961 (aged 28)	(Korea Football Association) Daewoo Royals
16	FW	Ko Jeong-woon	27 June 1966 (aged 24)	(Korea Football Association) Ilhwa Chunma
17	MF	Gu Sang-bum	15 June 1964 (aged 26)	(Korea Football Association) Lucky-Goldstar Hwangso
18	FW	Hwang Sun-hong	14 July 1968 (aged 22)	(Korea Football Association) Konkuk University
19	FW	Seo Jung-won	17 December 1970 (aged 19)	(Korea Football Association) Korea University
20	MF	Hong Myung-bo	12 February 1969 (aged 21)	(Korea Football Association) Korea University

== Group B ==
=== Iran ===
Coach: (Iran) Ali Parvin

No.	Pos.	Player	Date of birth (age)	Club
1	GK	Ahmad Reza Abedzadeh	25 May 1966 (aged 24)	(Football Federation Islamic Republic of Iran) Esteghlal Tehran
2	DF	Javad Zarincheh	23 July 1966 (aged 24)	(Football Federation Islamic Republic of Iran) Esteghlal Tehran
3	DF	Mojtaba Moharrami	16 April 1965 (aged 25)	(Football Federation Islamic Republic of Iran) Persepolis Tehran
4	MF	Mehdi Fonounizadeh	19 May 1962 (aged 28)	(Football Federation Islamic Republic of Iran) Esteghlal Tehran
5	DF	Mohammad Panjali	26 July 1955 (aged 35)	(Football Federation Islamic Republic of Iran) Persepolis Tehran
6	MF	Sirous Ghayeghran	22 January 1962 (aged 28)	(Football Federation Islamic Republic of Iran) Estghlal Anzali
7	MF	Morteza Kermani Moghaddam	11 July 1965 (aged 25)	(Qatar Football Association) Al-Ittihad Doha
8	MF	Shahrokh Bayani	31 December 1960 (aged 29)	(Football Federation Islamic Republic of Iran) Esteghlal Tehran
9	MF	Mehdi Abtahi	2 March 1963 (aged 27)	(Football Federation Islamic Republic of Iran) Vahdat Tehran
10	FW	Samad Marfavi	18 May 1964 (aged 26)	(Football Federation Islamic Republic of Iran) Esteghlal Tehran
11	FW	Nasser Mohammadkhani	7 September 1957 (aged 33)	(Football Federation Islamic Republic of Iran) Persepolis Tehran
12	DF	Shahin Bayani	31 January 1962 (aged 28)	(Football Federation Islamic Republic of Iran) Esteghlal Tehran
13	GK	Behzad Gholampour	23 December 1966 (aged 23)	(Football Federation Islamic Republic of Iran) PAS Tehran
14	DF	Reza Hassanzadeh	30 December 1964 (aged 25)	(Football Federation Islamic Republic of Iran) Esteghlal Tehran
15	DF	Nader Mohammadkhani	23 August 1963 (aged 27)	(Football Federation Islamic Republic of Iran) Persepolis Tehran
16	MF	Ali Eftekhari	29 July 1964 (aged 26)	(Football Federation Islamic Republic of Iran) Esteghlal Rasht
17	FW	Farshad Pious	12 January 1962 (aged 28)	(Football Federation Islamic Republic of Iran) Persepolis Tehran
18	MF	Majid Namjoo-Motlagh	13 May 1967 (aged 23)	(Qatar Football Association) Al Sadd SC
19	MF	Mohammad Hassan Ansarifard	9 September 1962 (aged 28)	(Football Federation Islamic Republic of Iran) Persepolis Tehran
20	MF	Mohsen Ashouri	2 January 1965 (aged 25)	(Football Federation Islamic Republic of Iran) Persepolis Tehran

=== Malaysia ===
Coach: Ahmad Shafie

No.	Pos.	Player	Date of birth (age)	Club
1	GK	Lim Hong Guan	2 June 1959 (aged 31)	
2	DF	Razip Ismail	23 April 1962 (aged 28)	(Football Association of Malaysia) Kuala Lumpur
3	DF	Shebby Singh	20 August 1960 (aged 30)	(Football Association of Malaysia) Kuala Lumpur
5	DF	Lee Kin Hong	27 November 1964 (aged 25)	(Football Association of Malaysia) Kedah
6	DF	Chow Siew Yai	13 November 1963 (aged 26)	(Football Association of Malaysia) Kuala Lumpur
7	MF	Ahmad Yusoff	3 August 1960 (aged 30)	
8	MF	S. Balachandran	26 February 1965 (aged 25)	
9	FW	Dollah Salleh	23 October 1963 (aged 26)	(Football Association of Malaysia) Selangor
10	MF	Abdul Aziz Hamid	20 August 1967 (aged 23)	
11	FW	Anbalagan Arjunan	2 April 1967 (aged 23)	
12	MF	Azizol Abu Haniffah	18 February 1960 (aged 30)	(Football Association of Malaysia) Perak
15	MF	Chan Keat Swee	11 October 1962 (aged 27)	(Football Association of Malaysia) Kedah
17	FW	Ravindran Paramasivam	11 August 1963 (aged 27)	
19	DF	Salim Mahmud	27 June 1961 (aged 29)	
20	GK	Azmi Mahmud	6 May 1967 (aged 23)	(Football Association of Malaysia) Kedah
	MF	A. Jayakanthan	20 September 1966 (aged 24)	(Football Association of Malaysia) Selangor
	MF	Gunalan Karupiah	13 September 1965 (aged 25)	

=== North Korea ===
Coach: Myong Dong-chan

No.	Pos.	Player	Date of birth (age)	Club
1	GK	Kim Chi-won	17 October 1967 (aged 22)	
2	DF	Kim Kwang-min	16 August 1962 (aged 28)	
3	MF	O Yong-nam	10 September 1960 (aged 30)	
4	DF	Kim Kyong-il	10 October 1970 (aged 19)	
5	DF	Jong Yong-man	8 January 1970 (aged 20)	
6	MF	Kim Jong-man		
7	FW	Han Hyong-il		
8	MF	Yun Chol	27 October 1972 (aged 17)	
9	MF	Yun Jong-su	3 January 1962 (aged 28)	
10	FW	Kim Yun-chol	30 November 1964 (aged 25)	
11	MF	Ri Jong-man	8 March 1959 (aged 31)	
12	DF	Tak Yong-bin	23 July 1962 (aged 28)	
13	MF	Kim Yong-nam	14 May 1958 (aged 32)	
14	DF	Jo In-chol	2 October 1973 (aged 16)	
15	FW	Choi Yong-son	10 October 1972 (aged 17)	
16	MF	Ryu Song-gun	16 December 1972 (aged 17)	
17	MF	Pang Gwang-chol	27 September 1970 (aged 19)	
18	GK	Kim Chung	21 November 1963 (aged 26)	
19	FW	Kim Jong-song	23 April 1964 (aged 26)	
20	FW	Kim Pung-il		

== Group C ==
=== Hong Kong ===
Coach: (Hong Kong) Kwok Ka Ming

No.	Pos.	Player	Date of birth (age)	Club
1	GK	Liu Chun Fai	8 December 1956 (aged 33)	(Football Association of Hong Kong, China) Lai Sun
2	DF	Tang Chu Shing	23 January 1959 (aged 31)	
3	DF	Chan Wai Chiu	23 December 1966 (aged 23)	(Football Association of Hong Kong, China) Sun Hei
4	DF	Chan Ping On	9 August 1959 (aged 31)	(Football Association of Hong Kong, China) South China
5	DF	Wong Kwok On	19 November 1961 (aged 28)	(Football Association of Hong Kong, China) Lai Sun
6	DF	Ku Kam Fai	27 January 1961 (aged 29)	(Football Association of Hong Kong, China) South China
7	FW	Lee Kin Wo	20 October 1967 (aged 22)	(Football Association of Hong Kong, China) Lai Sun
8	MF	Tam Siu Wai	17 September 1970 (aged 20)	(Football Association of Hong Kong, China) Eastern
9	FW	Wong Fuk Wing	20 January 1960 (aged 30)	(Football Association of Hong Kong, China) Sing Tao
10	MF	Leung Nang Yan	2 February 1954 (aged 36)	(Football Association of Hong Kong, China) Happy Valley
11	FW	Lai Wing Cheung	28 August 1962 (aged 28)	
12	MF	Tam Ah Fook	2 August 1962 (aged 28)	
13	MF	Chu Yue Tai	23 September 1966 (aged 23)	(Football Association of Hong Kong, China) South China
14	DF	Cheung Chi Tak	15 September 1958 (aged 32)	(Football Association of Hong Kong, China) Lai Sun
15	MF	Chow Chi Shing	29 July 1963 (aged 27)	(Football Association of Hong Kong, China) Police
16	MF	Chiu Chung Man	7 October 1969 (aged 20)	(Football Association of Hong Kong, China) South China
17	GK	Yam Wai Hung	10 July 1962 (aged 28)	(Football Association of Hong Kong, China) South China
18	MF	Law Wai Chi	24 December 1965 (aged 24)	(Football Association of Hong Kong, China) South China

=== Kuwait ===
Coach: (Kuwait) Mohammad Karam

No.	Pos.	Player	Date of birth (age)	Club
1	GK	Samir Said	5 November 1963 (aged 26)	(Kuwait Football Association) Al-Arabi
2	DF	Osama Hussain	11 August 1970 (aged 20)	(Kuwait Football Association) Al-Arabi
4	DF	Nawaf Al-Dhafairi	16 July 1971 (aged 19)	(Kuwait Football Association) Al-Jahra
5	DF	Sami Al-Hashash	15 September 1959 (aged 31)	(Kuwait Football Association) Al-Arabi
6	MF	Wael Sulaiman	8 August 1964 (aged 26)	(Kuwait Football Association) Al-Jahra
7	MF	Rashed Al-Bedaih		(Kuwait Football Association) Al-Qadsia
8		Waleed Al-Azmi		
10	FW	Nawaf Jadid Al-Enezi		
11	FW	Saleh Al-Mesnad		(Kuwait Football Association) Kazma
13		Adel Al-Khelaifi		(Kuwait Football Association) Kazma
14		Ahmad Hassan		
16	FW	Ali Marwi	14 October 1969 (aged 20)	(Kuwait Football Association) Al-Salmiya
		Abdulaziz Al-Hajri		(Kuwait Football Association) Al-Fahaheel
		Khaled Al-Hussaini		
		Waleed Al-Fulaij		
		Hamad Al-Saleh		(Kuwait Football Association) Al-Qadsia
	FW	Anbar Saeed		(Kuwait Football Association) Al-Arabi

=== Thailand ===
Coach: (Brazil) Carlos Roberto

No.	Pos.	Player	Date of birth (age)	Club
1	GK	Vilard Normcharoen	14 July 1962 (aged 28)	(Football Association of Thailand) Port Authority of Thailand
2	DF	Surak Chaikitti	1 October 1958 (aged 31)	(Football Association of Thailand) Rajpracha
3	DF	Sumet Akarapong	6 July 1971 (aged 19)	(Football Association of Thailand) Bangkok Bank
4	DF	Adipong Nukornavarat	4 May 1960 (aged 30)	(Football Association of Thailand) Port Authority of Thailand
5	DF	Anan Thongsuk	3 March 1970 (aged 20)	(Football Association of Thailand) Royal Thai Police
6	DF	Sutin Chaikitti	15 July 1956 (aged 34)	(Football Association of Thailand) Rajpracha
7	MF	Natee Thongsookkaew	9 December 1966 (aged 23)	(Japan Football Association) Matsushita Electric
8	MF	Pairote Puangchan	16 December 1966 (aged 23)	(Football Association of Thailand) Royal Thai Air Force
9	MF	Boonpleek Nounoi	28 April 1970 (aged 20)	(Football Association of Thailand) Royal Thai Police
10	MF	Vorawan Chitavanich	28 May 1961 (aged 29)	(Danish Football Association) Viborg
11	FW	Prateep Pankhaw	7 November 1962 (aged 27)	(Football Association of Thailand) Royal Thai Air Force
12	DF	Prapas Chamrasamee	12 September 1962 (aged 28)	(Football Association of Thailand) Port Authority of Thailand
13	FW	Prasert Changmoon	16 September 1972 (aged 18)	(Football Association of Thailand) Royal Thai Police
14	FW	Vithoon Kijmongkolsak	21 June 1962 (aged 28)	(Football Association of Malaysia) Pahang
16	MF	Wirasak Dechpramaunphol	25 February 1973 (aged 17)	(Football Association of Thailand) Thai Farmers Bank
17	FW	Ronnachai Sayomchai	14 September 1966 (aged 24)	(Football Association of Thailand) Port Authority of Thailand
18	GK	Chaiyong Khumpiam	29 August 1965 (aged 25)	(Football Association of Thailand) Royal Thai Police
19	MF	Charin Palsiri	7 April 1966 (aged 24)	(Football Association of Thailand) Telephone Organization of Thailand

=== Yemen ===
Coach: Azzam Khalifa

No.	Pos.	Player	Date of birth (age)	Club
	DF	Khaled Aref Abdo		
	MF	Saleh Al-Haj	6 August 1973 (aged 17)	
		Jamal Al-Khorabi	29 August 1963 (aged 27)	
	FW	Abubakar Al-Mass	1 January 1968 (aged 22)	(Yemen Football Association) Al-Tilal
	GK	Amin Al-Sanini	1 January 1965 (aged 25)	(Yemen Football Association) Al-Ahli Sanaa
		Faiadh Baghdadi	1 January 1967 (aged 23)	
		Hussein Jubari	1 January 1968 (aged 22)	
	FW	Sharaf Mahfood	20 July 1966 (aged 24)	(Yemen Football Association) Al-Tilal

== Group D ==
=== Bangladesh ===
Coach: (Bangladesh) Abdur Rahim

No.	Pos.	Player	Date of birth (age)	Club
	GK	Sayeed Hassan Kanan	15 February 1964 (aged 26)	(Bangladesh Football Federation) Mohammedan SC
	GK	Showkat Ali Selim	3 December 1963 (aged 26)	(Bangladesh Football Federation) Abahani Limited Dhaka
	DF	Barun Bikash Dewan	1 February 1969 (aged 21)	(Bangladesh Football Federation) Muktijoddha SKC
	DF	Kaiser Hamid	1 December 1964 (aged 25)	(Bangladesh Football Federation) Mohammedan SC
	FW	Mamun Joarder	17 February 1968 (aged 22)	(Bangladesh Football Federation) Victoria SC
	DF	Imtiaz Sultan Johnny	15 September 1961 (aged 29)	(Bangladesh Football Federation) Mohammedan SC
	DF	Monem Munna	9 June 1966 (aged 24)	(Bangladesh Football Federation) Abahani Limited Dhaka
	MF	Rumman Bin Wali Sabbir	5 June 1968 (aged 22)	(Bangladesh Football Federation) Mohammedan SC
	MF	Zakir Hossain	12 October 1971 (aged 18)	(Bangladesh Football Federation) Mohammedan SC
	MF	Saiful Bari Titu	3 August 1972 (aged 18)	(Bangladesh Football Federation) Mohammedan SC
	MF	Khandoker Wasim Iqbal	21 October 1961 (aged 28)	(Bangladesh Football Federation) Abahani Limited Dhaka
	FW	Imtiaz Ahmed Nakib	1 September 1969 (aged 21)	(Bangladesh Football Federation) Mohammedan SC
	MF	Sadekul Islam Uttam	10 October 1974 (aged 15)	(Bangladesh Football Federation) Fakirerpool YMC
	FW	Shafiqul Quader Munna	10 January 1974 (aged 16)	(Bangladesh Football Federation) Abahani Limited Dhaka
	DF	Rezaul Karim Rehan	6 September 1968 (aged 22)	(Bangladesh Football Federation) Abahani Limited Dhaka
	DF	S.M. Salahuddin	1958 (aged 32)	(Bangladesh Football Federation) Mohammedan SC
	FW	Sheikh Mohammad Aslam	1 March 1958 (aged 32)	(Bangladesh Football Federation) Abahani Limited Dhaka
	FW	Rizvi Karim Rumi	18 May 1968 (aged 22)	(Bangladesh Football Federation) Abahani Limited Dhaka

=== Japan ===
Coach: Kenzo Yokoyama

No.	Pos.	Player	Date of birth (age)	Club
	FW	Masahiro Fukuda	27 December 1966 (aged 23)	(Japan Football Association) Mitsubishi Motors
	MF	Kenta Hasegawa	25 September 1965 (aged 24)	(Japan Football Association) Nissan Motors
	DF	Tetsuji Hashiratani	15 July 1964 (aged 26)	(Japan Football Association) Nissan Motors
	DF	Takumi Horiike	6 September 1965 (aged 25)	(Japan Football Association) Yomiuri
	DF	Masami Ihara	18 September 1967 (aged 23)	(Japan Football Association) Nissan Motors
	MF	Shiro Kikuhara	7 July 1969 (aged 21)	(Japan Football Association) Yomiuri
	FW	Hisashi Kurosaki	8 May 1968 (aged 22)	(Japan Football Association) Honda
	MF	Yoshiyuki Matsuyama	31 July 1966 (aged 24)	(Japan Football Association) Furukawa Electric
	FW	Kazuyoshi Miura	26 February 1967 (aged 23)	(Japan Football Association) Yomiuri
	GK	Shinichi Morishita	28 December 1960 (aged 29)	(Japan Football Association) Yamaha Motors
	FW	Akihiro Nagashima	9 April 1964 (aged 26)	(Japan Football Association) Matsushita Electric
	MF	Ruy Ramos	9 February 1957 (aged 33)	(Japan Football Association) Yomiuri
	DF	Yuji Sakakura	7 June 1967 (aged 23)	(Japan Football Association) Furukawa Electric
	DF	Toru Sano	15 November 1963 (aged 26)	(Japan Football Association) Nissan Motors
	MF	Masanao Sasaki	19 June 1962 (aged 28)	(Japan Football Association) Honda
	GK	Kenichi Shimokawa	14 May 1970 (aged 20)	(Japan Football Association) Furukawa Electric
	DF	Katsuyoshi Shinto	15 September 1960 (aged 30)	(Japan Football Association) Mitsubishi Motors
	MF	Yasuharu Sorimachi	8 March 1964 (aged 26)	(Japan Football Association) All Nippon Airways
	DF	Yoshinori Taguchi	14 September 1965 (aged 25)	(Japan Football Association) All Nippon Airways
	FW	Nobuhiro Takeda	10 May 1967 (aged 23)	(Japan Football Association) Yomiuri

=== Saudi Arabia ===
Coach: (Brazil) Paulo Massa

No.	Pos.	Player	Date of birth (age)	Club
1	GK	Abdullah Al-Deayea	1 December 1961 (aged 28)	(Saudi Arabian Football Federation) Al-Tai
2	DF	Abdullah Al-Dosari	1 November 1969 (aged 20)	(Saudi Arabian Football Federation) Al-Ettifaq
3	DF	Sulaiman Al-Reshoudi	3 September 1972 (aged 18)	(Saudi Arabian Football Federation) Al-Taawoun
4	DF	Ahmed Jamil Madani	6 January 1970 (aged 20)	(Saudi Arabian Football Federation) Al-Ittihad
5	DF	Adnan Abdulshakoor	11 August 1972 (aged 18)	(Saudi Arabian Football Federation) Al-Wehda
6	MF	Saleh Al-Mutlaq	3 January 1966 (aged 24)	(Saudi Arabian Football Federation) Al-Nassr
7	MF	Fuad Anwar Amin	13 October 1972 (aged 17)	(Saudi Arabian Football Federation) Al-Shabab
8	FW	Fahad Al-Bishi	10 September 1965 (aged 25)	(Saudi Arabian Football Federation) Al-Nassr
9	FW	Majed Abdullah	11 January 1959 (aged 31)	(Saudi Arabian Football Federation) Al-Nassr
10	MF	Saleh Al-Mubarak	22 October 1971 (aged 18)	
14	MF	Khaled Al-Muwallid	23 November 1971 (aged 18)	(Saudi Arabian Football Federation) Al-Ahli
15	MF	Yousuf Al-Thunayan	18 November 1963 (aged 26)	(Saudi Arabian Football Federation) Al-Hilal
19	FW	Hamzah Idris	8 October 1972 (aged 17)	(Saudi Arabian Football Federation) Ohod
20	FW	Safouk Al-Temyat	12 September 1969 (aged 21)	(Saudi Arabian Football Federation) Al-Hilal
	MF	Khalid Al-Temawi	19 April 1969 (aged 21)	(Saudi Arabian Football Federation) Al-Hilal
	GK	Mohammed Al-Deayea	2 August 1972 (aged 18)	(Saudi Arabian Football Federation) Al-Tai
