= 1986 Fajr International Tournament =

1986 Fajr International Cup
Tournament details
- Host country: Iran
- Dates: 13 February – 21 February
- Teams: 8 (from 3 confederations)
- Venues: 2 (in 1 host cities)

Final positions
- Champions: Poland U21 (1st title)
- Runners-up: Iran
- Third place: Ghana

Tournament statistics
- Matches played: 16
- Goals scored: 37 (2.31 per match)
- Top scorer(s): Four players (3 goal each)

The 1986 Fajr International Cup (Persian: جام بین المللی فجر) was a friendly football tournament that took place in Tehran, Iran. Opening game was played on February 13, 1986, two days after Iranian Revolution Day which is a national public holiday and the final was played on February 21, 1986.

== Participant teams ==
The tournament's participants were from three confederations:

Iran	AFC
Iran B	AFC
(Iran) Khuzestan XI	AFC
Pakistan	AFC
(Syria) Al-Fotuwa SC	AFC
Ghana	CAF
Poland U21	UEFA
Romania U21	UEFA

== Venues ==
Tehran is located in Iran	Tehran	Tehran
Tehran is located in Iran	Azadi Stadium	Shahid Shiroudi Stadium
Tehran is located in Iran	Capacity: 100,000	Capacity: 30,000

== Referees ==
- (Iran) Mehdi Abarnirooei
- (Iran) Mohammad Abarnirooei
- (Iran) Jamshid Akhbari
- (Iran) Ali Arbabi (Mashhad FA)
- (Iran) Mostafa Bahrami
- (Iran) Bahman Behlouli
- (Iran) Hossein Dashtgerd (Tehran FA)
- (Iran) Hadi Dezfouli
- (Iran) Mohammad Reza Emami
- (Iran) Fereydoun Karamati(Anzali FA)
- (Iran) Hamid Khoshkhan(Tehran FA)
- (Iran) Ali Mohammad Lajmiri(Khuzestan FA)
- (Iran) Mohammadi(Bushehr FA)
- (Iran) Manouchehr Nazari(Tehran FA)
- (Iran) Jamshid Nikmehr
- (Iran) Mohammad Riahi
- (Iran) Mohammad Salehi(Tehran FA)
- (Iran) Hossein Tehrani(Tehran FA)
- (Pakistan) Mohammad Yusuf

== Group stage ==
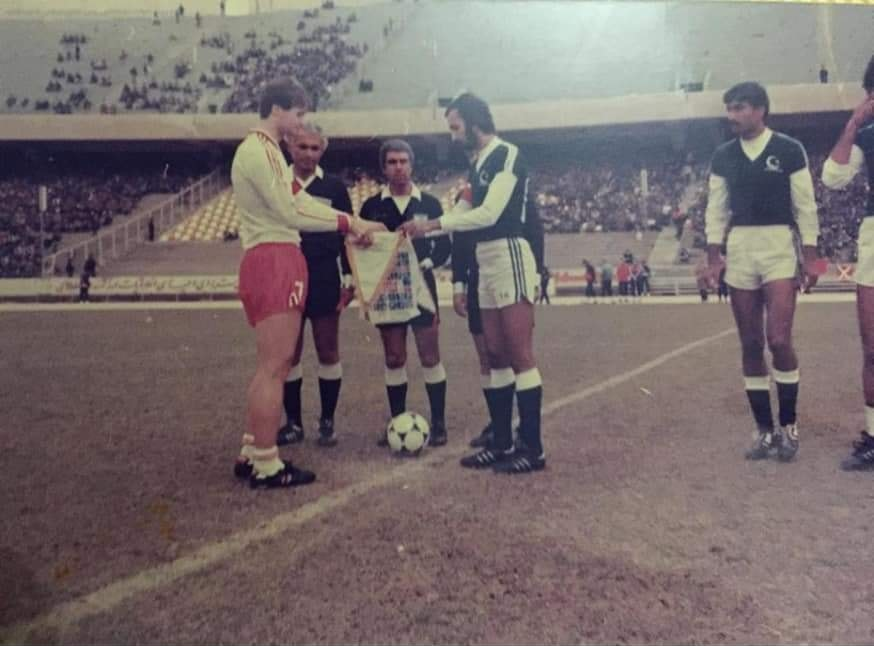
The Polish U-21 team and the Pakistan national team before their match in the group stage.

=== Group 1 ===
Team	Pld	W	D	L	GF	GA	GD	Pts	Qualification
Iran	3	2	1	0	7	0	+7	5	Semi-finals
Poland U21	3	2	1	0	7	0	+7	5	Semi-finals
(Syria) Al-Fotuwa SC	3	1	0	2	1	9	−8	2	
Pakistan	3	0	0	3	0	6	−6	0	

14 February 1986

Iran	5–0	(Syria) Al-Fotuwa SC
Changiz 5', 55'; Mohammadkhani 41', 68'; Yekke 85'	Report

Azadi Stadium, Tehran
Attendance: 30000
Referee: Manouchehr Nazari, (IRAN)

14 February 1986

Poland U21	3–0	Pakistan
Kaczmarek 11'; Leśniak 60'; Sikorski 88'

Azadi Stadium, Tehran
Attendance: 30000
Referee: Hamid Khoshkhan (Tehran FA)

16 February 1986

Iran	2–0	Pakistan
Alidoosti 8'; Changiz 16'	Report

Shahid Shiroudi Stadium, Tehran
Attendance: 20000
Referee: Jamshid Nikmehr (IRAN)

16 February 1986

Poland U21	4–0	(Syria) Al-Fotuwa SC
Chojnacki 5', 18'; Kaczmarek 14'; Maciniak 57'

Shahid Shiroudi Stadium, Tehran
Attendance: 15000
Referee: Mohammad Riahi (IRAN)

18 February 1986

Iran	0–0	Poland U21
Penalties
Bayani (penalty scored); Derakhshan (penalty scored); Najafi (penalty scored)	3 – 1 Decider for top position in Group Table	Czakon (penalty scored)

Azadi Stadium, Tehran
Attendance: 30000
Referee: Bahman Bahlouli (IRAN)

18 February 1986

(Syria) Al-Fotuwa SC	1–0	Pakistan
Kharabah 32'

Azadi Stadium, Tehran
Attendance: 25000
Referee: Mohammad Reza Emami (IRAN)

=== Group 2 ===
Team	Pld	W	D	L	GF	GA	GD	Pts	Qualification
Romania U21	3	2	0	1	4	2	+2	4	semi-finals
Ghana	3	2	0	1	3	3	0	4	semi-finals
Iran B	3	1	1	1	3	1	+2	3	
(Iran) Khuzestan XI	3	0	1	2	1	5	−4	1	

13 February 1986

Romania U21	1–0	Iran B
Cojocaru 81'

Azadi Stadium, Tehran
Attendance: 7000
Referee: Mohammad Salehi (Tehran FA)

15 February 1986

Iran B	3–0	Ghana
Sayami 19', 29'; Taghavi 60'

Shahid Shiroudi Stadium, Tehran
Attendance: 10000
Referee: Hadi Dezfouli (IRAN)

15 February 1986

Romania U21	3–1	(Iran) Khuzestan XI
Nuță 20' (pen.); Sabou 32'; Cojocaru 57'		Bakhtiarizadeh 73' (pen.)

Shahid Shiroudi Stadium, Tehran
Attendance: 8000
Referee: Bahman Behlouli (IRAN)

17 February 1986

Iran B	0–0	(Iran) Khuzestan XI

Shahid Shiroudi Stadium, Tehran
Attendance: 10000
Referee: Mehdi Abarnirooei (IRAN)

17 February 1986

Ghana	1–0	Romania U21
Acquah 35'

Shahid Shiroudi Stadium, Tehran
Attendance: 10000
Referee: Fereydoun Karamati (IRAN)

18 February 1986

Ghana	2–0	(Iran) Khuzestan XI
Smith 1'; Acquah 83'

Shahid Shiroudi Stadium, Tehran
Referee: Mohammad Salehi (IRAN)

== Knock-out stage ==
Semi-finals
19 February
Poland U21	3
Romania U21	1
20 February
Iran	2
Ghana	0

Final
2 February
Iran	2 (1)
Poland U21 (pen)	2 (3)
Third place
21 February
Ghana	1
Romania U21	0

== Semifinals ==
19 February 1986

Poland U21	3–1	Romania U21
Chojnacki 24' (pen.); Warzycha 25'; Czakon 83'		Nuță 35' (pen.)

Azadi Stadium, Tehran
Attendance: 25000
Referee: Hadi Dezfouli (IRAN)
20 February 1986

Iran	2–0	Ghana
Alidoosti 10'; Bayani 40' (pen.)	report

Azadi Stadium, Tehran
Attendance: 35000
Referee: Hamid Khoshkhan(IRAN)

== Third place match ==
21 February 1986

Ghana	1–0	Romania U21
Smith 87'

Azadi Stadium, Tehran
Referee: Jamshid Akhbari (IRAN)

== Final ==
21 February 1986

Iran	2–2	Poland U21
Yekke 22', 107'		Czakon 39', 93'
Penalties
Derakhshan (penalty scored)	1 – 3	Kaczmarek (penalty scored); Czakon (penalty scored); Warzycha (penalty scored)

Azadi Stadium, Tehran
Attendance: 65000
Referee: Manouchehr Nazari (IRAN)

== Champion ==
1986 Fajr International
Cup winners

First title

== Statistics ==
=== Goalscorers ===
There were 37 goals scored in 16 matches, for an average of 2.31 goals per match.

3 goals

- (Iran) Abdolali Changiz
- (Poland) Marek Chojnacki
- (Poland) Marek Czakon
- (Iran) Morteza Yeke

2 goals

- (Ghana) Henry Acquah
- (Iran) Hamid Alidoosti
- (Romania) Ioan Cojocaru
- (Romania) Nicolae Nuță
- (Poland) Zbigniew Kaczmarek
- (Iran) Nasser Mohammadkhani
- (Iran) Saeed Sayami (IRAN B)
- (Ghana) Ebo Smith

1 goal

- (Iran) Daryoosh Bakhtiarizadeh (Khuzestan XI)
- (Iran) Shahrokh Bayani
- (Syria) Adnan Kharabah
- (Poland) Marek Leśniak
- (Poland) Dariusz Maciniak
- (Romania) Marcel Sabou
- (Poland) Andrzej Sikorski
- (Iran) Reza Taghavi (IRAN B)
- (Poland) Krzysztof Warzycha

== Squads ==
=== Iran ===
Head coach: (Iran) Fereydoun Asgarzadeh

No.	Pos.	Player	Date of birth (age)	Caps	Goals	Club
1	GK	Ahmad Sajjadi	21 March 1961 (aged 24)			(Football Federation Islamic Republic of Iran) Homa
	GK	Jalal Basharzad	23 January 1964 (aged 22)			(Football Federation Islamic Republic of Iran) PAS
	DF	Shahin Bayani	31 January 1962 (aged 24)			(Football Federation Islamic Republic of Iran) Esteghlal
	DF	Asghar Hajiloo	1 August 1956 (aged 29)			(Football Federation Islamic Republic of Iran) Esteghlal
	DF	Mohammad Panjali (c)	26 July 1955 (aged 30)			(Football Federation Islamic Republic of Iran) Persepolis
	DF	Hossein Mesgar-Saravi	30 October 1957 (aged 28)			(Football Federation Islamic Republic of Iran) Darya Babol F.C.
	DF	Morteza Fonounizadeh	23 February 1961 (aged 24)			(Football Federation Islamic Republic of Iran) Persepolis
	MF	Shahrokh Bayani	7 August 1960 (aged 25)			(Football Federation Islamic Republic of Iran) Esteghlal
	MF	Sirous Ghayeghran	22 January 1962 (aged 24)			(Football Federation Islamic Republic of Iran) Malavan
	MF	Mehran Najafi				(Football Federation Islamic Republic of Iran)
	MF	Saeed Tahmatan	21 April 1960 (aged 25)			(Football Federation Islamic Republic of Iran) Bank Melli
	MF	Mahmoud Pazouki				(Football Federation Islamic Republic of Iran) Shahin
8	MF	Hamid Derakhshan	31 December 1957 (aged 28)			(Football Federation Islamic Republic of Iran) Persepoli
	MF	Morteza Yekke	20 October 1960 (aged 25)			(Football Federation Islamic Republic of Iran) Esteghlal
	MF	Hamid Alidousti	1 January 1956 (aged 30)			(Football Federation Islamic Republic of Iran) Homa
	FW	Nasser Mohammadkhani	7 September 1957 (aged 28)			(Football Federation Islamic Republic of Iran) Persepolis
	FW	Abdolali Changiz	13 March 1959 (aged 26)			(Football Federation Islamic Republic of Iran) Esteghlal

=== Iran B ===
Head coach: (Iran) Nasser Ebrahimi

No.	Pos.	Player	Date of birth (age)	Caps	Goals	Club
1	GK	Ahmad Reza Abedzadeh	25 May 1966 (aged 19)			(Football Federation Islamic Republic of Iran) Tam Isfahan S.C.
	GK	Pirouz_Joghtapour	29 April 1958 (aged 27)			(Football Federation Islamic Republic of Iran) Nassaji Ghaemshahr
	DF	Hossein Ghavifekr				(Football Federation Islamic Republic of Iran) Daraei
	DF	Mostafa Ardestani	22 December 1958 (aged 27)			(Football Federation Islamic Republic of Iran)
	DF	Mehdi Fonounizadeh	11 November 1965 (aged 20)			(Football Federation Islamic Republic of Iran) Nirooye Zamini
	DF	Mojtaba Holeh Kian				(Football Federation Islamic Republic of Iran)
	DF	Mohammad Hassan Ansarifard	9 September 1962 (aged 23)			(Football Federation Islamic Republic of Iran) Persepolis
	MF	Behtash Fariba (c)	11 February 1955 (aged 31)			(Football Federation Islamic Republic of Iran) Esteghlal
	MF	Amir Ghalenoei	21 November 1963 (aged 22)			(Football Federation Islamic Republic of Iran) Shahin
	MF	Majid Namjoo-Motlagh	13 May 1967 (aged 18)			(Football Federation Islamic Republic of Iran) Esteghlal
	MF	Mehdi Abtahi	2 March 1963 (aged 22)			(Football Federation Islamic Republic of Iran) Vahdat
	MF	Reza Taghavi	8 November 1960 (aged 25)			(Football Federation Islamic Republic of Iran) Nirooye Zamini
	MF	Mohammadali Nematzadeh				(Football Federation Islamic Republic of Iran) Bank Melli
	FW	Saeed Sayyami				(Football Federation Islamic Republic of Iran) F.C. Aboomoslem
	FW	Hamidreza Mansouri	30 July 1958 (aged 27)			(Football Federation Islamic Republic of Iran) Sepidrood Rasht F.C.
	FW	Farshad Pious	12 January 1962 (aged 24)			(Football Federation Islamic Republic of Iran) Persepolis
	FW	Karim Bavi	30 December 1964 (aged 21)			(Football Federation Islamic Republic of Iran) Shahin

=== Khuzestan XI ===
Head coach: (Iran) Haj Rahim Safarian

No.	Pos.	Player	Date of birth (age)	Caps	Goals	Club
	GK	Behzad Gholampour Shahani	2 February 1963 (aged 23)			(Football Federation Islamic Republic of Iran)
	GK	Karim Bostani	21 March 1952 (aged 33)			(Football Federation Islamic Republic of Iran)
	GK	Yaghoub Farisat (c)	22 March 1955 (aged 30)			(Football Federation Islamic Republic of Iran)
	DF	Parviz Marashian				(Football Federation Islamic Republic of Iran)
	DF	Mojtaba Yarali				(Football Federation Islamic Republic of Iran)
	DF	Saleh Moghimi				(Football Federation Islamic Republic of Iran)
	DF	Dariush Bakhtiarizadeh				(Football Federation Islamic Republic of Iran)
	DF	Mahmoud Baghalzadeh				(Football Federation Islamic Republic of Iran)
	DF	Siavash Bakhtiarizadeh	18 September 1961 (aged 24)			(Football Federation Islamic Republic of Iran)
	DF	Karim Marvani				(Football Federation Islamic Republic of Iran)
	MF	Majid Masanavi				(Football Federation Islamic Republic of Iran)
	MF	Seyed Hassan Seyed-Naameh				(Football Federation Islamic Republic of Iran)
	MF	Masoud Nowrouzi				(Football Federation Islamic Republic of Iran)
	MF	Rajabali Shahmoradi				(Football Federation Islamic Republic of Iran)
	MF	Manouchehr Vaziri				(Football Federation Islamic Republic of Iran)
	MF	Salman Saleh Tabar				(Football Federation Islamic Republic of Iran)
	FW	Jafar Delpasand				(Football Federation Islamic Republic of Iran)
	FW	Teymour Zebdeh				(Football Federation Islamic Republic of Iran)
	FW	Farzad Ahakpour				(Football Federation Islamic Republic of Iran)

=== Pakistan ===
Head coach: (Pakistan) Younus Changezi

No.	Pos.	Player	Date of birth (age)	Caps	Goals	Club
	GK	Muhammad Jahangir	11 June 1960 (aged 25)			(Pakistan Football Federation)
	GK	Jamshed Rana	1 June 1965 (aged 20)			(Pakistan Football Federation) Pakistan Airlines
	DF	Shaukat Mufti (c)	10 January 1955 (aged 31)			(Pakistan Football Federation)
	DF	Mukhtar Ali	25 July 1962 (aged 23)			(Pakistan Football Federation) Pakistan Airlines
	DF	Zafar Iqbal	3 February 1965 (aged 21)			(Pakistan Football Federation) Pakistan Airlines
	DF	Arbab Hayat Shahzada	22 January 1959 (aged 27)			(Pakistan Football Federation)
	DF	Samuel Gill	5 May 1959 (aged 26)			(Pakistan Football Federation)
	MF	Ejaz Ali	5 November 1963 (aged 22)			(Pakistan Football Federation) Pakistan Airlines
	MF	Abdul Majeed	12 November 1966 (aged 19)			(Pakistan Football Federation)
	MF	Fida Ur Rehman	27 April 1964 (aged 21)			(Pakistan Football Federation) Pakistan Airlines
	MF	Zulfiqar Ahmed	10 August 1964 (aged 21)			(Pakistan Football Federation)
	MF	Agha Saeed	7 October 1962 (aged 23)			(Pakistan Football Federation) KESC
	MF	Abdul Wahid	9 October 1965 (aged 20)			(Pakistan Football Federation) Pakistan Airlines
	FW	Mahmood Anwar	10 August 1960 (aged 25)			(Pakistan Football Federation) Pakistan Airlines
	FW	Wazeer Ali	1 January 1959 (aged 27)			(Pakistan Football Federation) Pakistan Railways
		Shah Wali	5 May 1963 (aged 22)			(Pakistan Football Federation)
		Muhammad Yacqoob	5 June 1965 (aged 20)			(Pakistan Football Federation)
		Arif Raza	29 December 1961 (aged 24)			(Pakistan Football Federation)

=== Al-Fotuwa SC ===
Head coach: (Syria) Anouar Abdul Kader

No.	Pos.	Player	Date of birth (age)	Caps	Goals	Club
1	GK	Nafaa Abdul Kader				(Syrian Football Association) al-Fotuwa SC
	GK	Salah Matar	1960			(Syrian Football Association) al-Fotuwa SC
	GK	Maher Faraj				(Syrian Football Association) al-Fotuwa SC
	DF	Mahmoud Noufel				(Syrian Football Association) al-Fotuwa SC
	DF	Waleed Awad				(Syrian Football Association) al-Fotuwa SC
	DF	Adnan Jassem				(Syrian Football Association) al-Fotuwa SC
	DF	Amer Awad				(Syrian Football Association) al-Fotuwa SC
	DF	Adnan Lajalah				(Syrian Football Association) al-Fotuwa SC
	MF	Jamal Said				(Syrian Football Association) al-Fotuwa SC
	MF	Fouaz Habib				(Syrian Football Association) al-Fotuwa SC
	DF	Jamal Anouishi				(Syrian Football Association) al-Fotuwa SC
	MF	Anouar Abdul Kader (c)	11 January 1953 (aged 33)			(Syrian Football Association) al-Fotuwa SC
	MF	Nidhar Yassini				(Syrian Football Association) al-Fotuwa SC
	MF	Hussam Yousef				(Syrian Football Association) al-Fotuwa SC
	MF	Amer Es-Sayed Ali				(Syrian Football Association) al-Fotuwa SC
	FW	Adnan Kharabeh				(Syrian Football Association) al-Fotuwa SC
	FW	Ahmed Asker				(Syrian Football Association) al-Fotuwa SC
	FW	Hassan Mousa				(Syrian Football Association) al-Fotuwa SC

=== Ghana ===
Head coach: (Ghana) Anthony Edusei

No.	Pos.	Player	Date of birth (age)	Caps	Goals	Club
	GK	Isaac Salifu Ansah				(Ghana Football Association) Asante Kotoko SC
	GK	Abukari Damba	30 December 1968 (aged 17)			(Ghana Football Association) Real Tamale United
	DF	Joseph Odoi (c)	23 September 1968 (aged 17)			(Ghana Football Association) Great Olympics
	DF	Freeman Turkson				(Ghana Football Association) Accra Hearts of Oak SC
	DF	Isaac Nana Eshun				(Ghana Football Association) Asante Kotoko SC
	DF	Rauf Iddi				(Ghana Football Association) Asante Kotoko SC
	DF	Philip Tagoe				(Ghana Football Association) Great Olympics
	MF	Ebo Smith	31 December 1965 (aged 20)			(Ghana Football Association) Eleven Wise
	MF	Henry Acquah	31 August 1965 (aged 20)			(Ghana Football Association) Hasaacas
	MF	Ahmed Dauda				(Ghana Football Association) Real Tamale United
	MF	Kwabena Asiedu	1966			(Ghana Football Association) Great Olympics
	MF	Olabode Williams				(Ghana Football Association) Hasaacas
	MF	Kwasi Bonsu				(Ghana Football Association) Great Olympics
	MF	Abedi Pele	5 November 1964 (aged 21)			(Ghana Football Association) Real Tamale United
	FW	Anthony Yeboah	6 June 1966 (aged 19)			(Ghana Football Association) Okwawu United
	FW	Ibrahim Meriga	1966			(Ghana Football Association) Okwawu United
	FW	Asare Boateng				(Ghana Football Association) Asante Kotoko SC
	FW	Ibrahim Mohammad				(Ghana Football Association) Cornerstones

=== Romania U21 ===
Head coach: (Romania) Gheorghe Staicu

No.	Pos.	Player	Date of birth (age)	Caps	Goals	Club
	GK	Lucian Hristea				(Romanian Football Federation)
	GK	Zoltán Mártin Iașko	30 August 1964 (aged 21)			(Romanian Football Federation) FC Universitatea Cluj
	GK	Răducanu Necula*	10 May 1946 (aged 39)			unattached
	DF	Niță Cireașă	21 January 1965 (aged 21)			(Romanian Football Federation) Chimia Râmnicu Vâlcea
6	DF	Marian Rada (c)	14 May 1960 (aged 25)			(Romanian Football Federation) FC Rapid București
	DF	Baicu Lupu				(Romanian Football Federation)
	DF	Liviu Baicea				(Romanian Football Federation) Dinamo Bucuresti
	DF	Cristian Bozhar				(Romanian Football Federation)
5	DF	Florin Popicu	25 October 1961 (aged 24)			(Romanian Football Federation) FC Universitatea Cluj
	MF	Pavel Badea	10 June 1967 (aged 18)			(Romanian Football Federation) Universitatea Craiova
7	MF	Marcel Sabou	22 August 1965 (aged 20)			(Romanian Football Federation) Dinamo Bucuresti
	MF	Iosif Rotariu	27 September 1962 (aged 23)			(Romanian Football Federation) Politehnica Timișoara
	MF	Nicolae Nuță	3 September 1967 (aged 18)			(Romanian Football Federation) FC Petrolul Ploiești
	MF	Gheorghe Dumitrașcu	28 November 1967 (aged 18)			(Romanian Football Federation) CS Târgoviste
	MF	Claudiu Bozeșan	24 July 1966 (aged 19)			(Romanian Football Federation)
9	FW	Ioan Cojocaru	21 May 1962 (aged 23)			(Romanian Football Federation) FC Corvinul Hunedoara
	FW	Sorin Bobaru	6 November 1965 (aged 20)			(Romanian Football Federation) FC Argeș Pitești

*Retired Romania national team goalkeeper Necula Raducanu who is assistant coach of the team was an unused sub in the group stage match versus Ghana.

*Bold players are over age of 23.

=== Poland U21 ===
Head coach: (Poland) Edmund Zientara

No.	Pos.	Player	Date of birth (age)	Caps	Goals	Club
	GK	Janusz Jedynak	10 January 1964 (aged 22)			(Polish Football Association) Śląsk Wrocław
	GK	Robert Sęk	25 May 1967 (aged 18)			(Polish Football Association) GKS Katowice
	DF	Jacek Grembocki	10 March 1965 (aged 20)			(Polish Football Association) Lechia Gdańsk
	DF	Janusz Góra	8 July 1963 (aged 22)			(Polish Football Association) Śląsk Wrocław
	DF	Wojciech Gorgoń	7 August 1963 (aged 22)			(Polish Football Association) Zagłębie Sosnowiec
	DF	Andrzej Sikorski	3 February 1957 (aged 29)			(Polish Football Association) Legia Warsaw
	DF	Andrzej Słowakiewicz	30 November 1963 (aged 22)			(Polish Football Association) Hutnik Kraków
	DF	Marek Piotrowicz	20 November 1963 (aged 22)			(Polish Football Association) Górnik Zabrze
	DF	Witold Wenclewski	4 April 1964 (aged 21)			(Polish Football Association) ŁKS Łódź
	MF	Marek Chojnacki	6 December 1959 (aged 26)			(Polish Football Association) ŁKS Łódź
	MF	Andrzej Rudy	15 October 1965 (aged 20)			(Polish Football Association) Śląsk Wrocław
	MF	Damian Lukasik	26 February 1964 (aged 21)			(Polish Football Association) Lech Poznan
	MF	Mariusz Kuras	21 August 1965 (aged 20)			(Polish Football Association) Pogoń Szczecin
	FW	Zbigniew Kaczmarek (c)	1 June 1962 (aged 23)			(Polish Football Association) Legia Warsaw
	FW	Marek Czakon	1 December 1963 (aged 22)			(Polish Football Association) Olimpia Poznan
	FW	Marek Leśniak	29 February 1964 (aged 21)			(Polish Football Association) Pogoń Szczecin
	FW	Krzysztof Warzycha	17 November 1964 (aged 21)			(Polish Football Association) Ruch Chorzów
	FW	Dariusz Marciniak	30 October 1966 (aged 19)			(Polish Football Association) Śląsk Wrocław
	FW	Juliusz Kruszankin	5 June 1965 (aged 20)			(Polish Football Association) ŁKS Łódź

*Bold players are over age of 23.
