= Zahid =

Zahid or Zahidi is a masculine given name of Arabic origin. Notable people with the name include:

== Given name ==
=== Zahid ===
- Zahid (Turkistan Islamic Party) (born 1977), Chinese-Syrian Army officer
- Zahid Abrol, Indian poet
- Zahid Ahmad (Afghan cricketer) (born 2003), Afghan cricketer
- Zahid Ahmad (footballer) (born 1978), Singaporean footballer
- Zahid Ahmed (actor) (born 1984), Pakistani actor
- Zahid Ahmed (Pakistani cricketer) (born 1961), Pakistani cricketer
- Zahid Akbar, Bangladeshi lyricist
- Zahid Ali (born 1976), Norwegian comedian
- Zahid Qurban Alvi, Pakistani politician and judge
- Zahid Hasan Ameli (born 1987), Bangladeshi footballer
- Zahidur Rahman Anjan (1964–2025), Bangladeshi film director
- Zahid Arip (born 1966), Malaysian politician
- Zahid Bashir, Pakistani-American businessman and politician
- Zahid Bassarath (born 1983), Trinidadian cricket umpire
- Zahid Beg (born 1964), Indian politician
- Zahid Ismail Bhutta, Pakistani politician
- Zahid Chanzeb, Pakistani politician
- Zahid Hafeez Chaudhri, Pakistani diplomat
- Zahid Chauhan, British politician
- Zahid Parvez Chowdhury (born 1987), Bangladeshi footballer
- Zahid Akram Durrani, Pakistani politician
- Zahid Fazal (born 1973), Pakistani cricketer
- Zahid Hameed (born 1985), Pakistani footballer
- Zahid Hamid (born 1947), Pakistani politician and lawyer
- Zahid Hasan (actor) (born 1965), Bangladeshi actor
- Zahid Hasan (scholar) (1918–1988), Indian Islamic scholar and politician
- Zahid Husain (banker) (1893–1957), Pakistani banker and diplomat
- Zahid Hussain (cricketer) (born 1974), Pakistani-Canadian cricketer
- Zahid Hussain (economist) (born 1953), Bangladeshi economist
- Zahid Hussain (journalist) (born 1949), Pakistani journalist, writer, and television analyst
- Zahid Hussain (writer) (born 1972), British writer, poet, and politician
- Zahid Ilyas, Pakistani Navy officer
- Zahid Iqbal (born 1981), English cricketer
- Zahid Khalilov (1911–1974), Azerbaijani mathematician and engineer
- Zahid Khan (cricketer) (born 2002), Afghan cricketer
- Zahid Khan (politician) (born 1956), Pakistani politician
- Zahid Ali Khan, Indian journalist
- Zahid Ali Akbar Khan (born 1933), Pakistani Army officer and engineer
- Zahid Ullah Khan, Pakistani politician
- Zahid Krasnov (born 1965), Ukrainian politician, businessman, and activist
- Zahid Luqman (born 1974), Pakistani footballer
- Zahid Mahmood (born 1988), Pakistani cricketer
- Zahid Mahmood (air marshal), Pakistani Air Force officer
- Zahid Maleque (born 1959), Bangladeshi politician
- Zahid Malik (1937–2016), Pakistani journalist, civil servant, and writer
- Zahid Mammadov (born 1981), Azerbaijani taekwondo practitioner
- Zahid Mansoor (born 1989), Pakistani cricketer
- Zahid Mardanov (born 2000), Azerbaijani footballer
- Zahid Muñoz (born 2001), Mexican footballer
- Zahid Niaz (born 1977), Pakistani footballer
- Zahid Oruj (born 1972), Azerbaijan politician
- Zahid Pirzada (born 1958), Pakistani field hockey player
- Zahid Quraishi (born 1975), American judge
- Zahidur Rahim (1935–1978), Bangladeshi Rabindra Sangeet exponent
- Zahid Ur Rashdi (born 1948), Pakistani Islamic scholar, writer, editor, and columnist
- Zahid Razzak (born 1967), Bangladeshi cricketer
- Zahid Ahsan Russel (born 1978), Bangladesh politician
- Zahid Sadiq (born 1965), Kenyan cricketer
- Zahid Saeed (born 1981), Pakistani cricketer
- Zahid Shah (born 1980), Pakistani-Emirati cricketer
- Zahid Shareef (born 1970), Pakistani field hockey player
- Zahid Sharif (born 1967), Pakistani field hockey player
- Zahid Sheikh (1949–2010), Pakistani field hockey player
- Zahid Al-Sheikh, Kuwaiti militant
- Zahid Suhrawardy (1870–1949), Indian judge
- Zahid Taj (born 1972), Pakistani footballer
- Zahid Valencia (born 1997), American freestyle wrestler
- Zahid Zakhail, Afghan cricketer

=== Zahidi ===
- Zahidi Zainul Abidin (1961–2026), Malaysian politician
