= Czakon =

Czakon is a Polish surname. Notable people with the surname include:

- Jakub Czakon (born 1985), Polish chess master
- Marek Czakon (1963–2024), Polish football player
