= Mukhtar Ali (disambiguation) =

Mukhtar Ali may refer to:

- Mukhtar Ali (footballer, born 1962), Pakistani footballer
- Muktar Ali (born 1989), Bangladeshi cricketer
- Mukhtar Ali (born 1997), Saudi Arabian footballer
