= Zahed =

Zahed (Zahid) (Arabic: زاهد) is an Arabic male name that means ascetic. Notable people with the name include:

== Given name ==
- Zahed Gilani (1216–1301) Iranian Grandmaster (Persian: murshid-i kamil) of the famed Zahediyeh Sufi order in Lahijan
- Zahed Mohamed (born 1992) Egyptian professional squash player
- Zahed Sultan, Kuwaiti multimedia artist, culture producer, filmmaker

== Family name ==
- Ataollah Zahed (1915–1991) Iranian actor, filmmaker

== See also ==
- Zahid
