= Niaz Ali Naji =

Pakistani footballer (born 1946)

Personal information
- Full name: Sheikh Niaz Ali Naji
- Date of birth: 1946 (age 79–80)
- Place of birth: British India
- Place of death: Lahore, Pakistan
- Position: Winger

Youth career
- 1966–1970: Young Men FC

Senior career*
Years	Team	Apps	(Gls)
1971–1986	Bata FC		

International career
1976	Pakistan		
- * Club domestic league appearances and goals

Sheikh Niaz Ali Naji (born 1946) was a Pakistani former footballer who played as a winger. Ali represented the Pakistan national team at 1976.

== Early life ==
Ali was born in 1946 in British India. After the independence of Pakistan in 1947, Ali along with his father Sheikh Hussain Ali and his family migrated and permanently settled in Lahore. Ali studied till high school.

== Club career ==
Ali started his playing career Young Men FC in 1966, and later played for Bata FC, playing as a winger from 1971 to 1986.

== International career ==
In 1966, Ali captained the Pakistan Youth national team. He toured Afghanistan in 1976 with the senior team at the Afghanistan Republic Day Festival Cup. Ali was selected to play for Pakistan Greens in the 1976 Quaid-e-Azam International Tournament, coming on as a substitute in a match against Afghanistan.

== Personal life ==
Niaz came from a family of footballers. Both his younger brothers Mukhtar Ali, and his other younger brother Ejaz Ali represented the Pakistan national team. Ali's son Zahid Niaz played for Pakistan Airlines and also the national team.
