= Pakistan Observer =

Pakistani newspaper

- Type: Daily newspaper
- Format: Broadsheet (Print), Online
- Owner(s): Faisal Zahid Malik
- Founder(s): Zahid Malik
- Publisher: Zahid Malik
- Editor-in-chief: Faisal Zahid Malik
- Managing editor: Gauhar Zahid Malik
- Founded: 1 November 1988; 36 years ago
- Language: English
- Headquarters: Islamabad, Pakistan
- Country: Pakistan
- Circulation: 150,000 in 2021
- Website: pakobserver.net

Pakistan Observer is an English-language daily newspaper of Pakistan.

It is published from six cities – Islamabad, Karachi, Lahore, Peshawar, Quetta and Muzaffarabad. The newspaper was founded in 1988 by Zahid Malik.

The newspaper was first published as an eveninger on 1 November 1988 from Islamabad, making it the first English eveninger to be published from the capital city. Later, it was made a morning newspaper. The newspaper is now led by Faisal Zahid Malik, who is also the editor-in-chief. The head office is in the capital city Islamabad, and it has five other offices in Karachi, Lahore, Peshawar, Quetta and Muzaffarabad.

== Daily circulation ==
Pakistan Observer newspaper has a daily circulation of 150,000 as of 2021.

Abdus Sattar, former Foreign Minister of Pakistan, remained the lead current affairs analyst of the newspaper. He focused on international security.

== See also ==
- List of newspapers in Pakistan
