= Zahid Niaz =

Pakistani footballer (born 1977)

Personal information
- Full name: Sheikh Zahid Niaz
- Date of birth: 21 June 1977 (age 49)
- Place of birth: Pakistan
- Position: Striker

Senior career*
Years	Team	Apps	(Gls)
1996–2011	Pakistan Airlines		

International career
1998	Pakistan U16		
2003	Pakistan	1	(1)
- * Club domestic league appearances and goals

Zahid Niaz (Urdu: زاہد نیاز; born 21 June 1977) is a former Pakistani footballer who played as a striker for Pakistan International Airlines and also represented the Pakistan national team.

== Club career ==
Niaz spent his entire career with Pakistan Airlines. In the 1997 National Football Championship, he had an remarkable campaign, scoring four goals in one match. This included a remarkable hat-trick completed in just three minutes against NWFP Red. He finished the tournament with a total of seven goals, which made him the top goal-scorer.

In 2002, Niaz was named the top-goalscorer in the 2002 President PFF Cup, with him scoring seven goals in the tournament.

== International career ==
Niaz captained Pakistan U16 at the 1998 AFC U-16 Championship qualification.

Niaz was selected to represent the Pakistan national team for the 2003 SAFF Gold Cup held in Dhaka, Bangladesh. He made his debut in the tournament against Sri Lanka, scoring in the 50th minute, the match resulted in a 2–1 win for Pakistan.

== Post-retirement ==
After retirement as player, Niaz took several coaching courses.

In 2013, Niaz served as assistant coach of Pakistan U14 for the inaugural AFC U-14 Championships held in Iran. Niaz served as an assistant coach for the 2018 SAFF U-15 Championship, where Pakistan earned a runner-up position in the tournament.

== Personal life ==
Niaz comes from a family of footballers, his father Niaz Ali Naji played for Bata FC and also represented Pakistan in 1976, his uncles Mukhtar Ali and Ejaz Ali were both prominent players for Pakistan in the 1980s. He also has a younger brother Oman Niaz, who played football alongside him.

== Career statistics ==
=== International ===
Scores and results list Pakistan's goal tally first, score column indicates score after each Niaz goal.

List of international goals scored by Zahid Niaz
No.	Date	Venue	Opponent	Score	Result	Competition
1	12 January 2003	Bangabandhu National Stadium, Dhaka, Bangladesh	Sri Lanka	1–0	2–1	2003 South Asian Football Federation Gold Cup

== Honours ==
=== Pakistan Airlines ===
- National Football Championship
  - Champions (1): 1997
