= Bertje Matulapelwa =

Indonesian football manager (1941–2002)

Personal information
- Date of birth: 1 January 1941
- Place of birth: Ambon, Indonesia
- Date of death: 9 July 2002 (aged 61)
- Place of death: Kendari, Indonesia

Managerial career
- Years: Team
- 1985–1989: Indonesia
- 1986: Pelita Jaya
- 1990–1991: Gresik United
- 1992–1993: PSIM Yogyakarta
- 1994–1995: BPD Jateng
- 1996–1997: Madura United
- 1999–2000: PSIM Yogyakarta

Bertje Matulapelwa, often called “The Reverend” (1 January 1941 – 9 July 2002), was an Indonesian football manager who last managed PSIM Yogyakarta.

== Career ==
Matulapelwa is regarded as one of the highest-performing Indonesian managers to have managed the Indonesian national team.

Matulapelwa was appointed to coach the Indonesian national team ahead of the 1985 SEA Games. In his first SEA Games, the Indonesian national team only reached the semifinals, suffering a 7-0 defeat to the Thailand.

Despite the setback at the 1985 SEA Games in Thailand, Matulapelwa was entrusted to coach Indonesian national team in the 1986 held in Seoul. The Indonesian national team surprisingly competed well against strong Asian nations.

In the group stage, the Indonesian national team advanced alongside Saudi Arabia, the group champions. In the quarterfinals, Indonesia defeated the United Arab Emirates in a penalty shootout of 4-3 after a 2-2 draw. Indonesian national team's journey ended in the semifinals against the host country, South Korea, with a score of 0-4. The Indonesian national team failed to secure the bronze medal after being defeated by Kuwait with a score of 0-5.

In the 1987 SEA Games, Matulapelwa prepared by calling up the best players from the two prestigious Indonesian competitions, Perserikatan and Galatama.

During the 1987 SEA Games, the Indonesian national team finished as the runner-up in Group B behind the Thailand due to a lower goal difference.

Despite finishing as the runner-up in Group B, the Indonesian national team defeated Burma 4-1 in the semifinals, earning them a spot in the final. In the final match held at Gelora Senayan (currently known as Gelora Bung Karno), Matulapelwa guided the Indonesian national team to defeat the Malaysia with a score of 1-0. The winning goal for the Indonesian national team was scored by Ribut Waidi in the 91st minute.

== Honours ==
=== Manager ===
Indonesia

- SEA Games gold medal: 1987
- Asian Games semi-final: 1986
