= Muhammad Saleem Awan =

Pakistani footballer (born 1961)

Personal information
- Full name: Muhammad Saleem Awan
- Date of birth: 1961 (age 64–65)
- Place of birth: Pakistan
- Position: Defender

Senior career*
Years	Team	Apps	(Gls)
1987–1994	WAPDA		

International career
1989–1990	Pakistan	7	(0)
- * Club domestic league appearances and goals

Muhammad Saleem Awan (Urdu: محمد سلیم اعوان), is a former Pakistani footballer, who played as a defender for WAPDA and for the Pakistan football team. He also contributed to the national team's first South Asian Games title in 1989.

== Club career ==
Awan played for WAPDA. He also contributed to the team's National Football Championship win in 1991, as well as helping them win the National Games the following year.

== International career ==
Awan would participate with the Pakistan national team at the 1990 World Cup qualifiers. He was also included for the starting line-up for the 1989 South Asian Games final against Bangladesh, which Pakistan would go on to win by 1–0.

== Post-retirement ==
After his retirement as player, Awan undertook several trainings to obtain a coaching license. He served as manager of Tribe FC Peshawar at the 2010 Super Football League, along with Mohammad Bashir as head coach.

== Honours ==
=== WAPDA ===
- National Football Championship
  - Winners (1): 1991
- National Games
  - Winners (1): 1992

=== Pakistan ===
- South Asian Games:
  - Winners (1): 1989
