= Samuel Gill =

Pakistani footballer (born 1959)

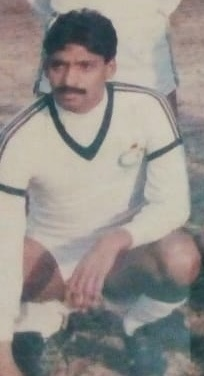
- Gill with Pakistan at the 1986 Fajr International Tournament

Personal information
- Full name: Samuel Gill
- Date of birth: 5 May 1959 (age 67)
- Place of birth: Lahore, Pakistan
- Position: Defender

Senior career*
Years	Team	Apps	(Gls)
- Bata FC Lahore
- Pakistan Railways

International career
1986	Pakistan		
- * Club domestic league appearances and goals

Samuel Gill (born 5 May 1959) is a former Pakistani footballer who played as a defender. He represented the Pakistan national team at the 1986 Asian Games.

== Early life ==
Gill comes from a Christian family which lived in Lahore. His brothers Emmanuel Gill, Lazar Gill, Ezra Gill, David Gill, and Daniel Gill have all played football.

== Club career ==
Gill played for Lahore based club Bata Sports. He also represented Lahore Division at the National Football Championship. He then joined Pakistan Railways.

== International career ==
In 1986, Gill was selected to represent the Pakistan national team for the 1986 Fajr International Tournament. He also participated for the Pakistan Greens side in the 1986 Quaid-e-Azam International Tournament. The same year, Gill served as vice-captain of the national team for the 1986 Asian Games held in Seoul, South Korea.

== Personal life ==
Gill's brothers Emmanuel Gill, Lazar Gill, Ezra Gill, Daniel Gill, and David Gill, have all played football for various different clubs and organisations. His brother Daniel Gill is a youth coach for "Model Town Football Academy". Daniel Gill along with his fellow mate Qamar Rizwan also hold a Guinness World Record for the most knocks of a football in 335 times with his forehead in 4 minutes and 46 seconds.
