= Nawaf Al-Dhafairi =

Kuwaiti footballer

Personal information
- Date of birth: 16 July 1971 (age 55)
- Position: Defender

International career
Years	Team	Apps	(Gls)
- Kuwait

Nawaf Al-Dhafairi (Arabic: نواف الظفيري, born 16 July 1971) is a Kuwaiti former footballer. He competed in the men's tournament at the 1992 Summer Olympics.
