= Lai Sun F.C. =

Hong Kong football club

Lai Sun (Chinese: 麗新) was a football team which played in Hong Kong First Division League from 1988 to 1991. In 1988, the team borrowed the HKFA membership from Double Flower and entered the league by the name of Lai Sun Double Flower. In the following season, it bought in the HKFA membership from Po Chai Pills and played under the name Lai Sun. The team quit the league in 1991 and returned the membership to Po Chai Pills.

== Trophies ==
- 1988–89: Hong Kong Viceroy Cup Winner, Hong Kong FA Cup Winner as Lai Sun Double Flower FA
- 1989–90: Hong Kong Viceroy Cup Winner
- 1990–91: Hong Kong Senior Shield 1st Runner-up, Hong Kong Viceroy Cup 1st Runner-up, Hong Kong FA Cup 1st Runner-up
