= Zahid Malik =

Pakistani journalist (1937–2016)

- Born: October 5, 1937; Sialkot, Pakistan
- Died: September 1, 2016 (aged 78); Islamabad, Pakistan
- Resting place: Islamabad
- Education: PhD in Philosophy
- Occupations: Journalist and editor
- Children: 4
- Writing career
- Pen name: Prisoner# 2627
- Language: Urdu, English
- Period: 1937–2016
- Subjects: Biographies, religious, philosophy
- Notable works: Dr A.Q. Khan and the Islamic Bomb
- Notable awards: Hilal-i-Imtiaz (Crescent of Excellence) Award by the Government of Pakistan in 2024 (posthumously awarded); Sitara-e-Imtiaz (Star of excellence) Award by the President of Pakistan in 2012; First Prize from the Writers Guild of Pakistan

Zahid Malik (October 5, 1937 – September 1, 2016), was a Pakistani journalist, civil servant, and writer, who was the founder and editor-in-chief of Pakistan Observer. He was also the founder-chairman of the think tank '101 Friends of China', a non-governmental organisation aimed towards improving Pakistan–China ties.

== Biography ==
Born on October 5, 1937, in a small village of Sialkot District, Malik belonged to a well-educated family. After he completed his graduation from Jinnah Islamia College Sialkot, Malik started his career as a civil servant. After his retirement as a joint secretary in the Ministry of Information and Broadcasting, Malik launched a monthly Urdu news and views magazine Hurmat in 1980 and later started the English language daily Pakistan Observer. He was the Editor-in-Chief and publisher of the newspaper.

When he was arrested on charges of official secret act, he was labelled as prisoner number 2627. He later used this as his pen name and used it to refer to himself in the books he wrote about Dr. A.Q. Khan.

Malik was patron-in-chief of the Nazaria-e-Pakistan Council, chairman of the International Seerat Centre and the Foundation for Coexistence of Civilizations. He was also the founder-chairman of the think tank '101 Friends of China', a non-governmental organisation aimed towards improving Pak-China ties.

== Views ==
Malik believed in Islamic ideology, and wrote several books on the topic, including Mazameen-e-Quran-e-Hakeem and Mazameen-e-Ahadith.

== Pakistan Observer ==
The Pakistan Observer was founded on 1 November 1988, as an English daily newspaper from Islamabad. It later became the only newspaper which was being published from six different stations, including Lahore and Karachi too.

Malik was the founder and the first Editor-in-Chief of the Pakistan Observer. Following his death, his eldest son, Faisal Zahid Malik, assumed the editorship.

== Awards and recognition ==
- Hilal-i-Imtiaz (Crescent of Excellence) Award by the Government of Pakistan in 2024 (posthumously awarded).
- Sitara-i-Imtiaz (Star of Excellence) Award by the President of Pakistan in 2012
