= Abukari Damba =

Ghanaian footballer

Abukari Damba (born 30 December 1968) is a Ghanaian former professional footballer who played as a goalkeeper.

== Career ==
Damba played for Real Tamale United in Ghana, and also in Perak FA in Malaysia. He was also capped for Ghana. Damba was selected as a reserve goalkeeper for the 1992 African Cup of Nations finals.

After he retired from playing, Damba became a football coach. He was the Ghana national team's goalkeeping coach before being asked to step down following corruption accusations in July 2007. Damba is the goalkeeping coach for Accra Hearts of Oak SC.

=== Coaching career ===
After retiring from playing, Damba became a goalkeeping coach.

- 2007 – Goalkeeping coach for the Ghana U23 national team, the Black Meteors
- National team goalkeeping coach for the Black Stars, stepped down in July 2007
- 2012 – Goalkeeping coach for Accra Hearts of Oak SC
- Later – Assistant Manager for Karela United
- Serves as a CAF/GFA coaching instructor and member of the Ghana Football Awards committee

== Personal life ==
Damba is from Tamale, Northern Region of Ghana.
