= Zahid Hussain (economist) =

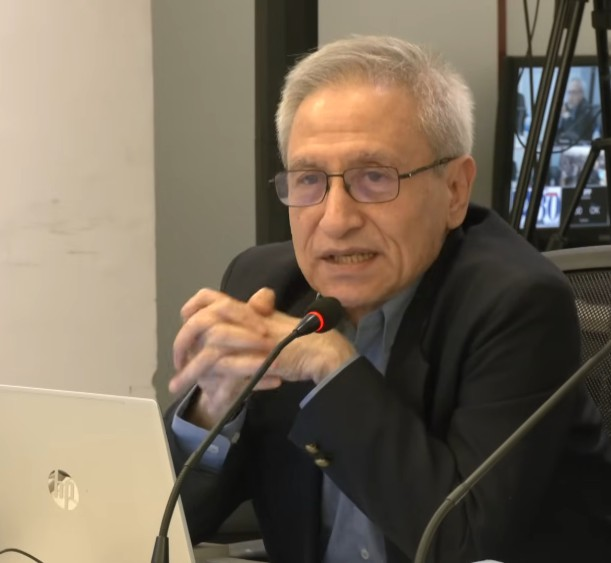
- Occupation: Economist

Academic background
- Education: IBA, Dhaka; Boston University

Academic work
- Institutions: World Bank, Dhaka

Dr. Zahid Hussain (born 9 November 1953) is a Bangladeshi economist. He is a former lead economist of World Bank in Dhaka. He was one of the members of the National White Paper Committee formed by Interim government of Muhammad Yunus, led by Debapriya Bhattacharya to evaluate the economic mismanagement of the Sheikh Hasina government and outlining a path toward reform.

== Education ==
Hussain completed his Bachelor in Economics from Chittagong Government College in 1976 and obtained a Master of Business Administration from the Institute of Business Administration, University of Dhaka, in 1979. He later earned a Master of Arts in Political Economy (1987) and a PhD in economics (1992) from Boston University in the United States.

== Career ==
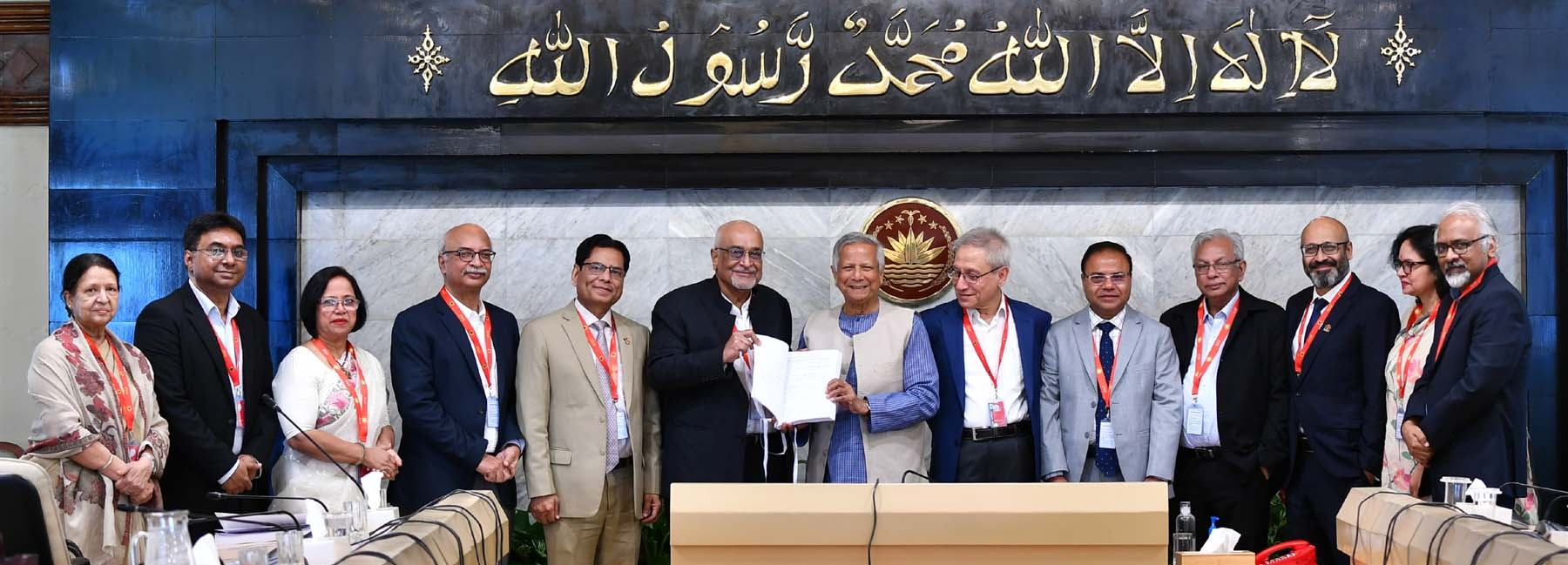
National white paper committee submits its report to Muhammad Yunus in December 2024

Hussain began his professional career in journalism before moving into academia. He subsequently taught at several universities in Bangladesh, the United States and Poland. After about fourteen years in teaching and research, he joined the Dhaka office of the World Bank in 1995. He later served as a Lead Economist and was part of the institution's Macro, Trade and Investment Global Practice team working on Bangladesh. In this capacity, he led the World Bank's macroeconomic monitoring work on the country and served as the lead author of the Bangladesh Development Update, a biannual publication produced by the Bank's Dhaka office.
