= Dariusz Marciniak (footballer) =

Polish footballer

Personal information
- Date of birth: 30 October 1966
- Place of birth: Rzeszów, Poland
- Date of death: 27 April 2003 (aged 36)
- Place of death: Kalisz, Poland
- Height: 1.80 m (5 ft 11 in)
- Position: Forward

Youth career
- Stal Rzeszów
- Walter Rzeszów
- Stal Rzeszów

Senior career*
Years	Team	Apps	(Gls)
1984	Widzew Łódź	3	(0)
1985–1988	Śląsk Wrocław	74	(20)
1988–1992	Zagłębie Lubin	39+	(8+)
1992	Sint-Truiden		
1992–1993	Charleroi	13	(3)
1993	Wavre Sports		
1994–1995	FC Gueugnon	24	(4)
1995	GKS Bełchatów	8	(2)
1996	RKS Radomsko		
1996–1997	Hessen Kassel	24	(10)
1997–1998	Borussia Fulda	16	(2)
1998–1999	1. FC Lok Stendal	18	(1)
2000	Pomerania Police		
2000	Odra Szczecin		
2000	Stomil Olsztyn	2	(0)
2001	TSG Sprockhövel		
2002	Pogoń Leżajsk		
2002	Skawinka Skawina		
2003	KKS 1925 Kalisz		

International career
- Poland U18
1987–1988	Poland	5	(1)
Medal record
Men's football
Representing Poland
UEFA European Under-18 Championship
Third place	1984 Soviet Union
- * Club domestic league appearances and goals

Dariusz Marciniak (30 October 1966 – 27 April 2003) was a Polish footballer who played as a forward.

== Honours ==
Śląsk Wrocław

- Polish Cup: 1986–87

Zagłębie Lubin

- Ekstraklasa: 1990–91

Poland U18

- UEFA European Under-18 Championship third place: 1984
