= Andrzej Sikorski =

Polish cyclist

Personal information
- Born: 4 September 1961 (age 65) Szczecin, Poland

Cycling career
- Sport: Cycling

Andrzej Sikorski (born 4 September 1961) is a Polish former cyclist. He competed in the team pursuit event at the 1988 Summer Olympics.
