= Reza Taghavi =

Iranian footballer and manager

Personal information
- Full name: Reza Taghavi
- Date of birth: 8 November 1960 (age 65)
- Place of birth: Sari, Mazandaran province, Iran
- Position: Forward

Youth career
- Neka Choob

Senior career*
Years	Team	Apps	(Gls)
- Homa
- Nassaji

International career
1986	Iran	3	(1)

Managerial career
- Nozhan
- Sanat
- * Club domestic league appearances and goals

Reza Taghavi (Persian: رضا تقوی) is an Iranian retired football forward and current coach.

He played for F.C. Nassaji Mazandaran and Iran national football team.

His three brothers Mohammad Taghavi, Hossein Taghavi and Hassan Taghavi were also football players.
