= Jalal Shaker =

Iraqi footballer

Personal information
- Full name: Jalal Shaker
- Date of birth: 1963 (age 62–63)
- Position: Defender

Senior career*
Years	Team	Apps	(Gls)
1983–1987	Al-Talaba		
1987–1988	Al-Jaish		
1988–1990	Al-Rasheed		

International career
1986	Iraq	1	(0)
- * Club domestic league appearances and goals

Jalal Shaker is a former Iraqi football defender. He competed in the 1986 Asian Games. Shaker played for Iraq between 1986 and 1987.

He was of Mandaean background, one of the only who played for the Iraqi football team.
