= Syed Muhammad Saifullah =

Pakistani footballer (born 1965)

Personal information
- Full name: Syed Muhammad Saifullah
- Date of birth: 2 August 1965 (age 61)
- Place of birth: Karachi, Pakistan
- Position: Midfielder

Youth career
- 1980–??: Liaquatabad FC

Senior career*
Years	Team	Apps	(Gls)
- Pakistan Steel

International career
1986	Pakistan		
- * Club domestic league appearances and goals

Syed Muhammad Saifullah (Urdu: سید محمد سیف اللہ; born 2 August 1965) is a Pakistani former footballer who played as a midfielder. He represented the Pakistan national team at the 1986 Asian Games.

== Early life ==
Saifullah was born on 2 August 1965 in Karachi.

== Club career ==
Saifullah started his football career with Karachi based Liaquatabad FC in 1980, and the next year he got a place in the Karachi District West team and later in the Sindh football team. He later played for several clubs including PIA Youth, Multan Division, Hyderabad Division, House Building Finance Corporation, Muslim Commercial Bank, until joining Pakistan Steel for which he played for most of the part of his career. He also received an award as player of tournament with Pakistan Steel in 1991.

== International career ==
Saifullah was selected for the Pakistan national youth yeam in 1986, and the same year he represented the Pakistan national team at the 1986 Asian Games. He also played as a key player for the national team in the fourth 1986 Quaid-e-Azam International Football Tournament.

== Post-retirement ==
After his retirement as player, Saifullah undertook several trainings to obtain a coaching license. He also featured as special guest in several local tournaments in Karachi.
