= Zbigniew Kaczmarek (footballer) =

Polish footballer

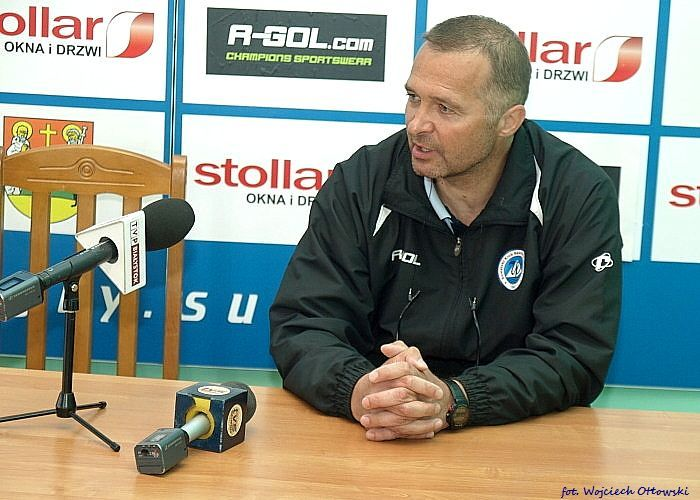

Personal information
- Full name: Zbigniew Waldemar Kaczmarek
- Date of birth: 1 June 1962 (age 64)
- Place of birth: Lębork, Poland
- Height: 1.82 m (6 ft 0 in)
- Position: Midfielder

Youth career
- 1976–1982: Stoczniowiec Gdańsk

Senior career*
Years	Team	Apps	(Gls)
1982–1990	Legia Warsaw	220	(10)
1990–1992	AJ Auxerre	54	(0)
1992–1994	En Avant Guingamp		
1994–1997	AC Ajaccio		
1997–1998	Polonia Gdańsk		
1998–1999	Lechia-Polonia Gdańsk	12	(0)

International career
- Poland U18
- Poland U20
1985–1991	Poland	30	(0)

Managerial career
- 2000–2001: Potok Pszczółki
- 2001–2003: GTS Kolbudy
- 2003–2004: KS Żukowo
- 2004–2006: Arka Gdynia
- 2007–2010: Wigry Suwałki
- 2010–2013: Stomil Olsztyn
- 2014–2015: Wigry Suwałki
- 2016: Olimpia Zambrów
- 2016–2017: Mławianka Mława
- 2017: Mławianka Mława
- 2018–2019: Wda Świecie
Medal record
Men's football
Representing Poland
UEFA European Under-18 Championship
Runner-up	1980 East Germany
- * Club domestic league appearances and goals

Zbigniew Kaczmarek (born 1 June 1962) is a Polish professional football manager and former player. He played 30 times for Poland.

== Honours ==
=== Player ===
Legia Warsaw

- Polish Cup: 1988–89, 1989–90
- Polish Super Cup: 1989

Poland U18

- UEFA European Under-18 Championship runner-up: 1980

=== Manager ===
Wigry Suwałki

- II liga East: 2013–14

Mławianka Mława

- Polish Cup (Ciechanów-Ostrołęka regionals): 2017–18

== Sources ==
- Barreaud, Marc (1998). Dictionnaire des footballeurs étrangers du championnat professionnel français (1932-1997). L'Harmattan, Paris. ISBN 2-7384-6608-7.
- Zbigniew Kaczmarek at WorldFootball.net
