= Samir Abdul-Ridha =

Iraqi footballer (born 1960)

Personal information
- Full name: Samir Abdul-Ridha Shaker
- Date of birth: 1 July 1960 (age 66)
- Place of birth: Iraq
- Position: Goalkeeper

Senior career*
Years	Team	Apps	(Gls)
- Al-Jaish SC
- Salahaddin SC

International career
1981–1986	Iraq		
- * Club domestic league appearances and goals

Samir Abdul-Ridha (born 1 July 1960) is an Iraqi former football goalkeeper who played for Iraq in the 1986 Asian Games. He played for the national team between 1981 and 1986.
