= Abdul Majeed (footballer) =

Pakistani footballer (born 1966)

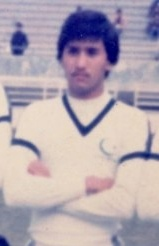
- Majeed with Pakistan at the 1986 Fajr International Tournament

Personal information
- Full name: Abdul Majeed
- Date of birth: 12 November 1966 (age 59)
- Place of birth: Faisalabad, Pakistan
- Position: Central midfielder

Senior career*
Years	Team	Apps	(Gls)
1982–1987	Crescent Textile Mills		
1988–1993	Pakistan Airlines		

International career
1985–1992	Pakistan		(1)
- * Club domestic league appearances and goals

Abdul Majeed (Urdu: عبدالمجید; born 12 November 1966) is a Pakistani former footballer who played as a midfielder, and represented the Pakistan national team in the 1980s and 1990s.

== Club career ==
Majeed played for Crescent Textile Mills during the early 1980s, before moving to Pakistan Airlines. At Pakistan Airlines, Majeed would become a key player in their National Football Championship wins in 1989 and 1992–93. He also participated with Pakistan Airlines in the 1990–91 Asian Club Championship as well as the 1992–93 Asian Cup Winners' Cup.

== International career ==
In 1985, Majeed played for the Pakistan national team at the 1985 South Asian Games. The next year, Majeed took part in the 1986 Quaid-e-Azam International Tournament with Pakistan Greens who finished as runners-up, scoring a goal against Nepal in a 5–0 win. In March 1986, Majeed featured for Pakistan at the 1986 Fajr International Tournament in Tehran. He was also selected for the Pakistan national team for their participation in the 1986 Asian Games and the 1990 Asian Games.

In 1991, Majeed helped Pakistan win their first Football at the South Asian Games title, where he was a starter in all three matches the team played, including the final which they won 2–0 against the Maldives. The following year he was present with the national team for the 1992 Jordan International Tournament.

== Career statistics ==
=== International goals ===
Scores and results list Pakistan's goal tally first, score column indicates score after each Majeed goal.

List of international goals scored by Abdul Majeed
No.	Date	Venue	Opponent	Score	Result	Competition	Ref.
1	2 May 1986	Jinnah Sports Stadium, Islamabad	Nepal	4–0	5–0	1986 Quaid-e-Azam International Cup	

== Honours ==
=== PIA ===
- National Football Championship
  - Champions (2): 1989, 1992–93

=== Pakistan ===
- South Asian Games:
  - Winners (1): 1991
