= Marek Czakon =

Polish footballer (1963–2024)

Personal information
- Date of birth: 1 December 1963
- Place of birth: Opole, Polish People's Republic
- Date of death: 25 April 2024 (aged 60)
- Place of death: Opole, Poland
- Height: 1.92 m (6 ft 4 in)
- Position: Forward

Senior career*
Years	Team	Apps	(Gls)
1984–1985	Odra Opole		
1985	Górnik Zabrze		
1986–1988	Olimpia Poznań	36	(5)
1988	Broń Radom		
1989–1991	Ilves	80	(27)
1991–1994	BK Frem	32	(7)
1994	Naestved IF	7	(2)
1994–1996	Eintracht Trier	49	(25)
1996	Union Berlin	20	(13)
1997	Waldhof Mannheim	10	(0)
1997–1999	Eintracht Trier	60	(27)
1999–2001	SV Elversberg	70	(25)
2001–2004	US Hostert	61	(64)
2004	SG Gusenburg/Grimburg		
2005–2008	SV Pölich/Schleich		
Total		425	(195)
- * Club domestic league appearances and goals

Marek Czakon (1 December 1963 – 25 April 2024) was a Polish professional footballer who played as a forward.

During his career, Czakon played in the premier divisions of Finland and Denmark and in the 2. Bundesliga in Germany. He was the top scorer of the Finnish Veikkausliiga in 1990 with 16 goals. He died on 25 April 2024, at the age of 60.

== Honours ==
Ilves

- Finnish Cup: 1990

Individual

- Veikkausliiga top scorer: 1990
