= Fida Ur Rehman =

Pakistani footballer (born 1964)

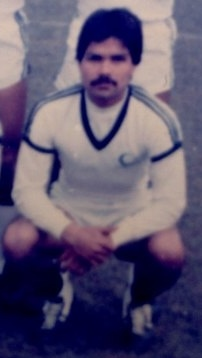
- Rehman with Pakistan at the 1986 Fajr International Tournament

Personal information
- Full name: Fida Ur Rehman
- Date of birth: 27 April 1964 (age 62)
- Place of birth: Wah Cantt, Pakistan
- Position: Midfielder

Senior career*
Years	Team	Apps	(Gls)
- Pakistan Airlines

International career
1986–1991	Pakistan		
- * Club domestic league appearances and goals

Fida Ur Rehman (born 27 April 1964) is a Pakistani former footballer who played as a midfielder. He won the 1989 and 1991 South Asian Games with Pakistan, and was a regular starting player at the 1990 FIFA World Cup qualification in the country's first participation in the tournament. He also played at the 1986 and 1990 Asian Games.

== Club career ==
In 1985, Rehman featured in the National Youth Football Championship. Rehman played for Pakistan Airlines throughout his career at the National Football Championship. In 1991, he was declared the top goal-scorer with 6 goals of the TAAN Cup tournament held in Kathmandhu, Nepal, where Pakistan Airlines finished in third place.

== International career ==
Rehman made his international debut with Pakistan at the 1986 Fajr International Tournament in Tehran under the captainship of Shaukat Mufti. The next year, he featured at the 1986 Asian Games held in Seoul and the 1986 Quaid-e-Azam International Tournament held in Islamabad. The following year, he played at the 1987 South Asian Games where Pakistan finished third, achieving the bronze.

After featuring in the 1988 AFC Asian Cup qualification held in Kuala Lumpur, Rehman was a starting player at the 1990 FIFA World Cup qualification in the country's first ever participation in the tournament.

He also featured with the national team at the 1989 South Asian Games helping the national side achieve the gold medal, and played next year in the 1990 Asian Games. The next year, he played at the 1991 South Asian Games, where Pakistan again retained the gold after winning in the final against Maldives.

== Honours ==
=== Pakistan ===
- South Asian Games:
  - Winners (2): 1989, 1991
