= Ahmad Sajjadi =

Iranian footballer

Personal information
- Date of birth: 1 July 1960 (age 66)
- Place of birth: Tehran, Iran
- Height: 1.88 m (6 ft 2 in)
- Position: Goalkeeper

Senior career*
Years	Team	Apps	(Gls)
1980–1991	Homa		
1991–1994	Bank Tejarat		
1994–1997	Bahman		

International career
1986–1989	Iran	8	(0)
1996	Iran national futsal team		

Managerial career
- 1998–2000: Iran (goalkeeping coach)
- 2002–2006: Iran (goalkeeping coach)
- 2010–2012: Naft Tehran (goalkeeping coach)
- 2012–2014: Foolad (goalkeeping coach)
- 2014–2015: Sepahan (goalkeeping coach)
- * Club domestic league appearances and goals

Ahmad Sajjadi is an Iranian football goalkeeper who played for Iran in the 1988 Asian Cup.

== Honours ==
- AFC Asian Cup (third place): 1988

== Bibliography ==
- Teammelli.com Profile
