= Jamshed Rana =

Pakistani footballer (born 1965)

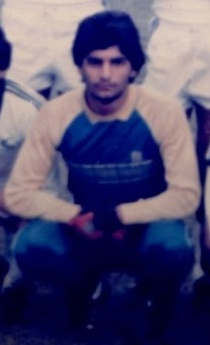
- Rana with Pakistan at the 1986 Fajr International Tournament

Personal information
- Full name: Jamshed Anwar Rana
- Date of birth: 1 June 1965 (age 61)
- Place of birth: Rawalpindi, Pakistan
- Position: Goalkeeper

Senior career*
| Years | Team | Apps | (Gls) |
- Heavy Mechanical Complex
- Pakistan Airlines

International career
| 1985–1987 | Pakistan | | |
- * Club domestic league appearances and goals

Jamshed Anwar Rana (born 1 June 1965), is a Pakistani former footballer who played as a goalkeeper. Rana is among the major goalkeepers of the Pakistan national football team in the 1980s.

== Club career ==
In 1981, Rana featured in the National Youth Football Championship. He first started his career with Heavy Mechanical Complex football team of Taxila, and later represented Pakistan Airlines at the National football Championship.

== International career ==
Akhtar made his international debut at the 1985 South Asian Games in Dhaka, where he was praised for his performance. He later featured in several tournaments including the 1986 Fajr International Tournament in Iran, the 1986 Pakistan President's Gold Cup, 1986 Quaid-e-Azam International Tournament, 1986 Asian Games, 1988 Summer Olympics Qualification and the 1987 South Asian Games, which proved to be his last international tour as starting goalkeeper. He was part of the squad at the 1990 Asian Games as substitute for Mateen Akhtar.
