= Ejaz Ali (footballer) =

Pakistani footballer (born 1963)

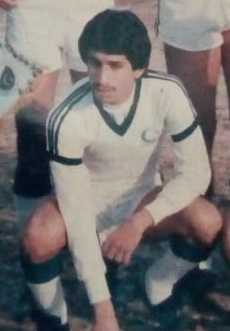
- Ali with Pakistan at the 1986 Fajr International Tournament

Personal information
- Date of birth: 5 November 1963 (age 62)
- Place of birth: Lahore, Pakistan
- Position: Midfielder

Youth career
- Bata FC

Senior career*
Years	Team	Apps	(Gls)
- WAPDA
- Pakistan Railways
- Pakistan Steel
- Pakistan Airlines

International career
1986	Pakistan U20		
1985–1990	Pakistan		(2)
- * Club domestic league appearances and goals

Ejaz Ali (Urdu: اعجاز علی; born 5 November 1963), is a Pakistani former footballer who played as a midfielder. Ali is among the major players of the Pakistan national football team in the 1980s and 1990s, and was part of the national team which won gold at the 1989 South Asian Games.

== Early life ==
Ali was born on 5 November 1963 in Lahore, in the Punjab province of Pakistan. He studied up to FA level, and started his football career with Bata Club of Lahore, where he impressed several coaches and scouts as a midfielder.

== Club career ==
Ali subsequently represented National Football Championship departmental sides WAPDA, Pakistan Railways, Pakistan Steel and Pakistan Airlines, helping the latter win several titles.

In 1991, he participated with PIA at the TAAN Cup tournament in Nepal, scoring a goal in a 1–2 defeat against Tiong Bahru CSC.

== International career ==
Ali represented Pakistan youth in the Asian Youth Cup qualifiers in Dammam, Saudi Arabia, and later in Quetta in 1986. He represented Pakistan on senior level at the South Asian Games in 1985 held in Dhaka, and 1987 in Calcutta. Ali also participated in the 1986 Fajr International Tournament held in Iran, the 1986 Pakistan President's Gold Cup held in Karachi, and the 1986 Asian Games held in Seoul, South Korea, and the Quaid-e-Azam International Tournament in 1985, 1986 and 1987. In 1987, he featured at the 1988 Summer Olympics qualifiers against Nepal, and later at the 1988 AFC Asian Cup qualification.

Ali was also a member of the historic team that won the gold medal in the 1989 South Asian Games in Islamabad, where he played as a starter. The next year, he featured in the 1990 Asian Games held in Beijing, China.

== Personal life ==
Ejaz came from a family of footballers, two of his older brothers Niaz Ali Naji and Mukhtar Ali also represented the Pakistan national team, the latter as captain and alongside him on several occasions. His eldest brother Niaz Ali's son Zahid Niaz also played for the national team.

== Career statistics ==
=== International goals ===
Scores and results list Pakistan's goal tally first, score column indicates score after each Ejaz goal.

List of international goals scored by Ejaz Ali
No.	Date	Venue	Opponent	Score	Result	Competition
1	21 December 1985	Dhaka Stadium, Dhaka, Bangladesh	Bangladesh		1–2	1985 South Asian Games
2	2 May 1986	Jinnah Sports Stadium, Islamabad	Nepal	1–0	5–0	1986 Quaid-e-Azam International Tournament

== Honours ==
=== Pakistan ===
- South Asian Games:
  - Winners (1): 1989
