= Zahid Luqman =

Pakistani footballer (born 1974)

Personal information
- Full name: Rana Zahid Luqman
- Date of birth: 9 December 1974
- Place of birth: Faisalabad, Pakistan
- Positions: Striker; winger

Senior career*
Years	Team	Apps	(Gls)
1988–1989	Crescent Textile Mills		
1990–1991	Punjab Reds		
1992–1994	Wohaib		
1994–??	WAPDA		

International career
1990–1992	Pakistan	3	(0)
- * Club domestic league appearances and goals

Zahid Luqman (Urdu: زاہد لقمان; born 1974) is a former Pakistani footballer who played as a forward for the Pakistan national team.

== Early life ==
Luqman hails from Jaranwala in the Faisalabad district of Pakistan.

== Club career ==
Luqman started his career with Crescent Textile Mills and featured at the 1988–89 Asian Club Championship qualifying stage in Kolkata. In 1990, Luqman featured in the National Youth Football Championship.

Luqman later represented the Punjab football team, his partnership with fellow player Qazi Ashfaq contributed to the team's success at the National Games where the team won the competition in 1990, and also won the 1990 National Football Championship, where he found the net in the final. The same year, the team played at the 1990–91 Asian Cup Winners' Cup.

He later played for Wohaib FC and also featured in the 1992–93 Asian Club Championship, where the team managed to win over clubs like Club Valencia from Maldives and Brothers Union from Bangladesh to qualify for the second group.

He later played for WAPDA.

== International career ==
Luqman was selected to represent Pakistan for the 1990 Asian Games. In the tournament, he played against China and South Korea, In which Pakistan lost both matches. He also played against Sudan in the 1992 Jordan International Tournament.

== Post-retirement ==
After his retirement as player, Luqman undertook several trainings to obtain a coaching license.

== Honours ==
- National Football Championship
  - Winners (1): 1990
- National Games
  - Gold medal (1): 1990
  - Silver medal (1): 1992
