= Mukhtar Ali (footballer, born 1962) =

Pakistani footballer (born 1962)

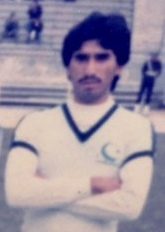
- Ali with Pakistan at the 1986 Fajr International Tournament

Personal information
- Full name: Sheikh Mukhtar Ali
- Date of birth: 25 July 1962 (age 64)
- Place of birth: Lahore, Pakistan
- Position: Defender

Youth career
- 1978–1982: Bata FC

Senior career*
Years	Team	Apps	(Gls)
1982–1986	WAPDA		
1987–1994	Pakistan Airlines		

International career
1984–1988	Pakistan		
- * Club domestic league appearances and goals

Sheikh Mukhtar Ali (born 25 July 1962) is a Pakistani former footballer who played as a defender. He played for Pakistan Airlines throughout his career, and captained the Pakistan national team on several occasions from 1986 till 1988, guiding the national side achieve the bronze medal at the 1987 South Asian Games.

== Early life ==
Ali was born on 25 July 1962 in Lahore, in the Punjab province of Pakistan. He studied up to FA level, and started his football career with Bata Club of Lahore at the age of 15, where he played from 1978 till 1982.

== Club career ==
In 1979, Ali featured in the National Youth Football Championship, where he led the Punjab team.

Ali played for WAPDA from 1982 till 1986, and later for Pakistan Airlines throughout his career at the National Football Championship till 1994.

== International career ==
=== Early years ===
In 1982, Ali represented Pakistan youth in the 30th Asian Youth Championship held in Kathmandu, Nepal. He also featured against a team of Southwest German Football Association which arrived in Pakistan on 3 January 1983 on a six day tour. In the first test played at Rawalpindi, the Germans beat Pakistan 0–3, with Mukhtar scoring a self goal in the second half in a bid to clear the ball which ultimately deflected from another Pakistani defender's foot and landed in the goal. The second test in Karachi on 8 January ended in a 0–2 defeat.

Mukhtar made his senior international debut with Pakistan at the 1984 AFC Asian Cup qualification held in Calcutta, later playing at the 1984 Merdeka Tournament. The following year, he played at the 1985 Quaid-e-Azam International Tournament held in Peshawar.

=== Captaincy (1986–1988) ===
Ali played at the 1986 Fajr International Tournament in Tehran and the 1986 Pakistan President's Gold Cup where he was vice-captain after Shaukat Mufti. He wore the captain armband for the first time at the President's Cup. He was selected as the main captain at the 1986 Quaid-e-Azam International Tournament held in Islamabad. After playing at the 1986 Asian Games where the Muhammad Naveed took over as captain, Mukhtar was once again handed the captaincy in the 1988 Summer Olympics qualification in 1987, and the 1987 South Asian Games in India, helping the team achieve the bronze medal.

He also played as captain at the 1988 AFC Asian Cup qualification in Kuala Lumpur, marking his final appearances with the national team.

== Post-retirement ==
After his retirement as player, Mukhtar undertook several trainings to obtain a coaching license.

== Personal life ==
Mukhtar came from a family of footballers. His elder brother Niaz Ali Naji and his younger brother Ejaz Ali also represented the Pakistan national team, the latter alongside him on several occasions. His eldest brother Niaz Ali's son Zahid Niaz also played for the national team.

== Honours ==
Pakistan Airlines

- National Football Championship: 1989, 1992–93

== See also ==
- List of Pakistan national football team captains
