= List of Iranian Super Cup winning managers =

This is a list of Iranian Iranian Super Cup winning football managers.

== By year ==
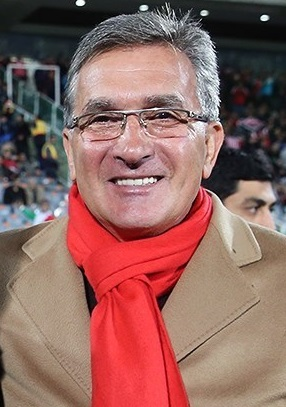
Branko Ivanković who won Super Cup in 2017, 2018 and 2019

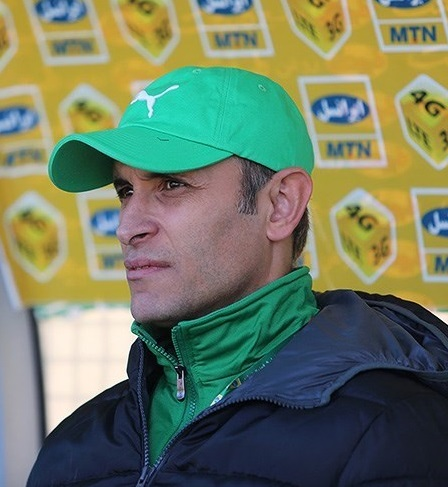
Yahya Golmohammadi who won Super Cup in 2016, 2020 and 2023

Year	Manager	Nationality	Club	Ref
2005	Majid Jalali	Iran	Saba	
2016	Yahya Golmohammadi	Iran	Zob Ahan	
2017	Branko Ivanković	Croatia	Persepolis	
2018	Branko Ivanković	Croatia	Persepolis	
2019	Branko Ivanković	Croatia	Persepolis	
2020	Yahya Golmohammadi	Iran	Persepolis	
2021	Javad Nekounam	Iran	Foolad	
2022	Ricardo Sá Pinto	Portugal	Esteghlal	
2023	Yahya Golmohammadi	Iran	Persepolis	
2024	Patrice Carteron	France	Sepahan	
2025	Dragan Skočić	Croatia	Tractor	

== The performance of the managers in the finals ==
Rank	Nationality	Manager	Won	Runner-up	Years won	Years runner-up	Clubs
1	Iran	**Yahya Golmohammadi**	3	1	2016, 2020, 2023	2021	Zob Ahan, Persepolis
2	Croatia	Branko Ivanković	3	0	2017, 2018, 2019		Persepolis
3	Portugal	**Ricardo Sá Pinto**	1	1	2022	2025	Esteghlal
4	Iran	Majid Jalali	1	0	2005		Saba Battery
4	Iran	**Javad Nekounam**	1	0	2021		Foolad
4	France	Patrice Carteron	1	0	2024		Sepahan
4	Croatia	**Dragan Skočić**	1	0	2025		Tractor
8	Iran	**Rasoul Khatibi**	0	1		2020	Tractor
8	Iran	Mojtaba Khorshidi	0	1		2017	Naft Tehran
8	Iran	**Sirous Pourmousavi**	0	1		2016	Esteghlal Khuzestan
8	Croatia	Mladen Frančić	0	1		2005	Foolad
8	Iran	**Hamid Motahari**	0	1		2022	Nassaji
8	Iran	Karim Bagheri^{c}	0	1		2024	Persepolis

**Bold**	=	Still active as manager

(c) = caretaker manager

=== By nationality ===
Country	Managers	Total
Iran	3	5
Croatia	2	4
Portugal	1	1
France	1	1

== See also ==
- Iranian Super Cup
- List of Hazfi Cup winning managers
- List of Iranian Football League winning managers
- List of Iranian Futsal League winning managers
