= Yahya Golmohammadi =

Iranian former footballer and coach (born 1971)

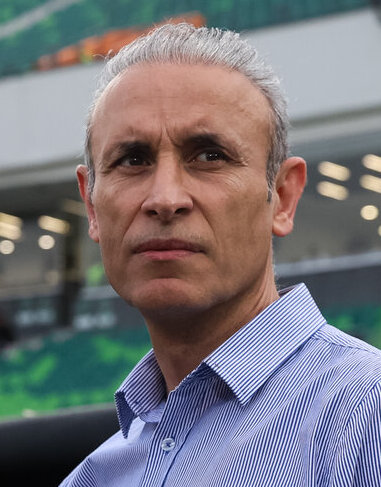
- Golmohammadi as Foolad manager in 2024

Personal information
- Full name: Yahya Golmohammadi
- Date of birth: 19 March 1971 (age 55)
- Place of birth: Minabad, Iran
- Height: 1.83 m (6 ft 0 in)
- Position: Center back

Team information
- Current team: Iran U-23 (manager)

Senior career*
Years	Team	Apps	(Gls)
1989–1991	Tractor Sazi		
1991–1993	Poora	19	(3)
1993–1995	Bank Tejarat	16	(3)
1995–1999	Persepolis	45	(1)
1999–2002	Foolad	38	(8)
2002–2005	Persepolis	57	(3)
2005–2009	Saba Battery	69	(6)

International career
2002	Iran U-23	9	(1)
1993–2006	Iran	73	(5)

Managerial career
- 2008: Saba
- 2009–2010: Tarbiat Yazd
- 2010–2011: Nassaji
- 2011–2012: Rah Ahan (assistant)
- 2012: Saba
- 2012: Persepolis (assistant)
- 2012–2013: Persepolis
- 2013–2014: Naft Tehran
- 2014–2016: Zob Ahan
- 2017: Oxin Alborz
- 2017–2018: Tractor Sazi
- 2018–2020: Padideh
- 2020–2024: Persepolis
- 2024–2026: Foolad
- 2026: Duhok
- 2026–: Iran U-23
Medal record
Representing Iran
Asian Games
Gold medal – first place	2002 Busan	Team competition
- * Club domestic league appearances and goals

Yahya Golmohammadi (Persian: یحیی گلمحمدی; born 19 March 1971) is an Iranian football coach and a former player. He is one of only eleven Iranians to score in a World Cup and he is the oldest player to score on his first World Cup start, doing so for Iran in 2006 against Mexico. His position was usually the central defender. He was a member of Iranian national football team and played most of his career in Persepolis. He previously managed some big clubs in Iran, including: Persepolis, Naft Tehran, Zob Ahan, Tractor Sazi and Padideh.

== Early life ==
He was born on 19 March 1971 in Minabad, Ardabil province, where he was recognized for his footballing talent as a youngster. He is Talysh.

== Playing career ==
=== Club ===
Yahya Golmohammadi played most of his professional career for Persepolis. He made his debut as a football player in 1989 with Tractor Sazi. Two years later, he signed with Poora. He played in Poora for four years and later signed with Persepolis in 1995 and began his work with Stanko Poklepović and won the league in his first season. In 1999, he moved to Ahvaz based club Foolad, but returned to Persepolis after only three seasons. In 2005, Yahya left Persepolis for a lucrative contract with Saba Battery, many critics were skeptical about his success in this newly formed team, but Saba Battery, with the help of Golmohammadi and Iranian national teammate Ali Daei, surprised everyone by winning the Hazfi Cup, and also did extremely well in the Asian Champions League, beating more experienced and seasoned campaigners. He played for Saba until 2008 when he announced his retirement as a football player.

=== International ===
Golmohammadi played as a defender. He scored the winning goal in the final minute of a 2002 World Cup qualifying match against the Republic of Ireland, although Iran lost on aggregate and failed to qualify for the tournament.

On 11 June 2006, Golmohammadi scored the equaliser in a 3–1 loss to Mexico in the opening round of the 2006 FIFA World Cup. His tackle against Luís Figo in the next game against Portugal cost Iran a penalty. Golmohammadi was injured in the same game and was not available for Iran's final World Cup game versus Angola. He retired from international football immediately after World Cup 2006. He has 74 caps for the senior team and scored five times during his international duty.

He was also a member of Iran national under-23 football team in 2002 Asian Games which Iran won the football tournament under Branko Ivanković.

== Coaching career ==
=== Saba ===
After the resignation of Mohammad Hossein Ziaei as the head coach of Saba Battery, Golmohammadi was named as his successor to lead the team for the ensuing fixtures. Golmohammadi led Saba in the remaining ten matches and led them to a third-place finish behind Persepolis and Sepahan which is the best result for Saba in Iran Pro League in the club's history. There were many rumors that Golmohammadi would continue to lead Saba for the following season but he refused to extend his contract. Firouz Karimi succeeded him as head coach of Saba in June 2008.

=== Tarbiat Yazd ===
In July 2008, Golmohammadi took over the Azadegan League side Tarbiat Yazd. His team started the 2008–09 season with three consecutive wins but at the end of the season, Tarbiat finished at 5th place of Group B and were not promoted to the Iran Pro League. He continued his work with Tarbiat Yazd the following season and led the team to a third-place finish but were shy one point of qualifying for a promotion play-off. At the end of the season, he resigned as head coach of Tarbiat Yazd in order to become head coach of another Azadegan league side, Nassaji Mazandaran.

=== Nassaji Mazandaran ===
He became head coach of his native town team, Nassaji Mazandaran in July 2010. He was also unable to promote Nassaji to the Iran Pro League as they finished at 4th place in the 2010–11 season. He was sacked by the club in September 2011.

=== Rah Ahan ===
After Ali Daei became head coach of Rah Ahan, he was chosen by his former teammate as first team coach. Yahya worked with Daei for one season as his assistant along with Željko Mijač but separated from the Rah Ahan coaching staff at the end of the season in order to take over the reins of Saba Qom for the second time.

=== Return to Saba ===
After Abdollah Veisi left the team for Paykan, Golmohammadi was named as head coach of Saba for a second time and returned to the club where he began his coaching career after four years. Golmohammadi signed a one-year contract with the club. His first match was a 4–0 win over Paykan which placed Saba at the top of the league. They stayed at the top the following week as well. They also defeated Persepolis 2–0 at the Azadi Stadium. The day after, Saba defeated Gahar Zagros 1–0. However, Golmohammadi was transferred to a hospital due to heart complications. He resigned on 24 September 2012 as head coach of Saba Qom due to health problems. His team was in 7th place before his departure.

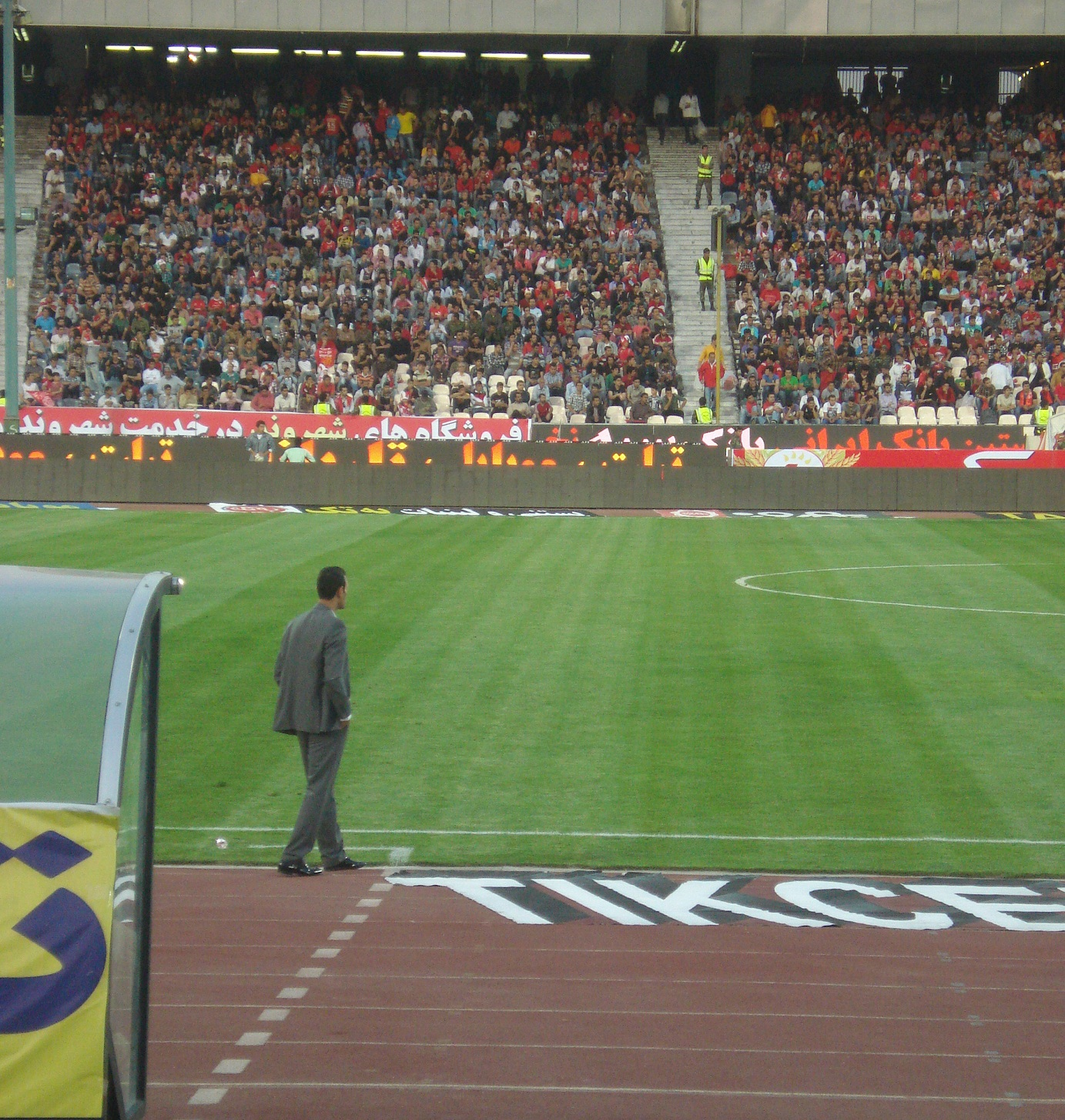
Golmohammadi as Persepolis manager in a match against Malavan, 29 April 2013

=== Persepolis ===
On 25 September 2012, Persepolis officials announced that Golmohammadi would become the assistant coach of Manuel José instead of Mohsen Ashouri. He officially began his work on 26 September. On 7 December 2012, Golmohammadi was promoted to the first team as the caretaker manager after Jose was banned from training camp by club president Mohammad Rouyanian. Three days later, he was confirmed as the club's head coach and signed a contract with the club until the end of the season. He appointed Vinko Begović and Karim Bagheri as his new assistant managers at Persepolis.

His first game in charge of Persepolis came in a Hazfi Cup match against Malavan which his team won 6–0 with a hat-trick from Karim Ansarifard, two goals from Hadi Norouzi and a final goal from Gholamreza Rezaei. His side won their other three matches in Hazfi Cup to qualified to the final, when they lose in penalties to Sepahan. His first game for Persepolis in Iran Pro League was ended 2–2 against Sanat Naft with two early goals from Ali Karimi and Mohammad Nouri. With a 2–0 victory against Fajr Sepasi, Golmohammadi presiding over his first league win as manager of Persepolis. He then led Persepolis to an eleventh undefeated streak until a 1–0 loss to Rah Ahan on 10 March 2013. When he became head coach, Persepolis was in 12th place and he moved to sixth place in Iran Pro League table. Persepolis finished the season in the seventh place. He was offered by club officials a two years extension which was close to sign but after Hazfi Cup final, he refused to sign and his managerial rule at Persepolis was finished on 11 May 2013.

=== Naft Tehran ===
On 20 May 2013, Yahya signed a one-year contract with Naft Tehran, replacing Mansour Ebrahimzadeh. His side began the season with a 1–0 away win against Fajr Sepasi. Naft Tehran finished the 2013–14 Iran Pro League in 3rd place, qualified to the AFC Champions League play-offs that marked the club's best position in its history. Golmohammadi left Naft Tehran to Zob Ahan by mutual consent on 10 May 2014, after only one season in charge of the team.

=== Zob Ahan ===
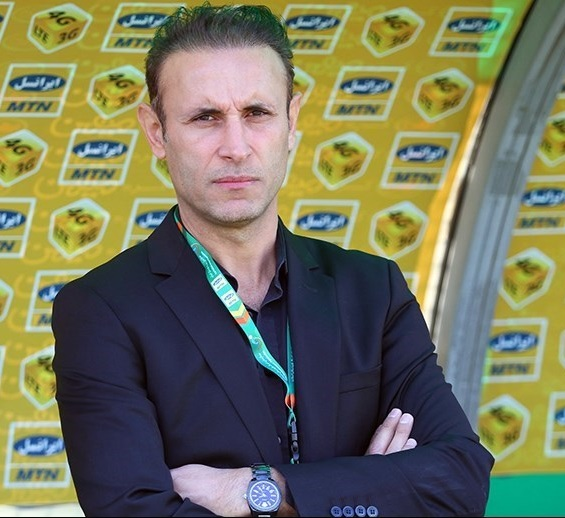
Golmohammadi before Isfahan derby (2016).

On 10 May 2014, Zob Ahan announced on their official website that Yahya Golmohammadi signed a two-year deal with the Isfahani outfit. Despite a disappointing start, Zob Ahan began their successful run from the January 2015. They finished the league in the 4th place, securing AFC Champions League spot. They also won Hazfi Cup after defeating Naft Tehran in the final. The title was the first major trophy that Golmohammadi won since he started his managerial career. Zob Ahan also won the title in next year for the second season in row, by defeating Esteghlal in the final. He also managed to win the first addition of Iranian Super cup since its relaunch (the competition was abandoned in 2005 up until 2016).

On 24 September 2016, Golmohammadi parted away with Zob Ahan after a poor start of the season, which placed Zob Ahan in the 14th position.

=== Return to Persepolis ===
On 13 January 2020, Golmohammadi was named Persepolis F.C. head coach, replacing Argentine Gabriel Calderón. This was Golmohammadi's second stint with Persepolis F.C.. At that moment he took charge of a team who were leading the Persian Gulf Pro League by 3 points. "This is a huge honor". Golmohammadi said in his first interviews as Persepolis new coach. After managing this team for 4 years and achieving a lot of honours in Persepolis F.C., On 1 January 2024 after the match against Mes Rafsanjan F.C., he announced his resignation as his role.

== Career statistics ==
=== Club ===
As of 3 June 2010

Club performance			League		Cup		Continental		Total	
Season	Club	League	Apps	Goals	Apps	Goals	Apps	Goals	Apps	Goals
Iran			League		Hazfi Cup		Asia		Total	
1999–00	Foolad	Azadegan League					-	-		
2000–01	Foolad	Azadegan League					-	-		
2001–02	Foolad	Iran Pro League	23	6	2	0	-	-	25	6
2002–03	Persepolis	Iran Pro League	16	3	2	0	3	2	21	5
2003–04	Persepolis	Iran Pro League	19	0	1	0	-	-	20	0
2004–05	Persepolis	Iran Pro League	23	0	1	0	-	-	24	0
2005–06	Saba	Iran Pro League	23	3	3	0	6	1	32	4
2006–07	Saba	Iran Pro League	18	4	5	1	-	-	23	5
2007–08	Saba	Iran Pro League	22	0	1	0	-	-	23	0
Career total			144	16	13	1	9	3	166	20

=== International goals ===
Scores and results list Iran's goal tally first.

#	Date	City	Opponent	Final score	Result	Competition
1	8 August 2001	Tehran, Iran	Oman	5–2	Win	LG Cup
2	15 November 2001	Tehran, Iran	Republic of Ireland	1–0	Win	2002 FIFA World Cup qualification
3	26 September 2003	Amman, Jordan	Jordan	2–3	Loss	2004 AFC Asian Cup qualification
4	19 November 2003	Beirut, Lebanon	Lebanon	3–0	Win	2004 AFC Asian Cup qualification
5	11 June 2006	Nuremberg, Germany	Mexico	1–3	Loss	2006 FIFA World Cup

=== Managerial record ===
As of match played 1 January 2024

Team	From	To	Record							
Team	From	To	G	W	D	L	Win %	GF	GA	GD
Saba	28 March 2008	7 June 2008	10	3	4	3	30.00	14	11	+3
Tarbiat Yazd	4 July 2008	2 July 2010	52	21	19	12	40.38	61	42	+19
Nassaji	3 July 2010	1 September 2011	26	11	9	6	42.31	34	17	+17
Saba	20 June 2012	24 September 2012	9	4	2	3	44.44	12	8	+4
Persepolis	10 December 2012	31 May 2013	22	10	10	2	45.45	35	18	+17
Naft Tehran	1 June 2013	1 June 2014	32	16	9	7	50.00	42	24	+18
Zob Ahan	1 June 2014	24 September 2016	85	42	27	16	49.41	137	76	+61
Tractor Sazi	24 May 2017	16 January 2018	18	7	5	6	38.89	26	20	+6
Padideh	1 June 2018	13 January 2020	51	27	12	12	52.94	53	33	+20
Persepolis	13 January 2020	7 January 2024	177	107	49	21	60.45	248	102	+146
Total			462	238	138	86	50.12	662	351	+311

== Honours ==
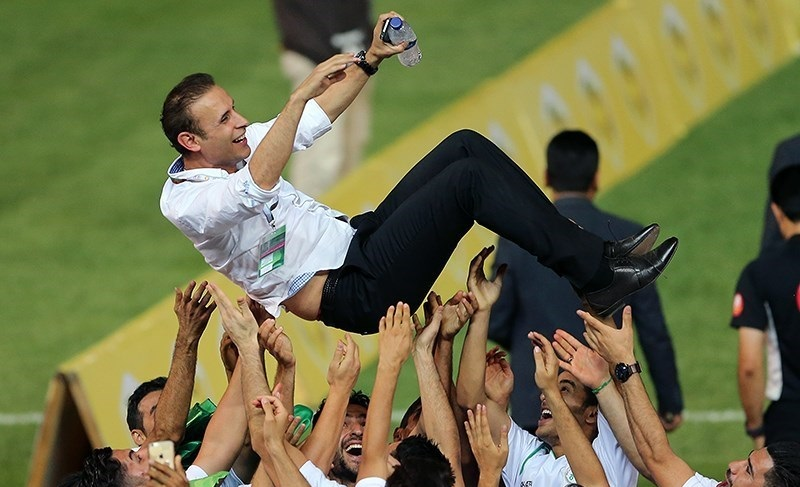
Golmohammadi celebrating Hazfi Cup title in 2015

=== Player ===
Persepolis

- Iranian Football League (3): 1995–96, 1996–97, 1998–99
- Iranian Hazfi Cup (1): 1998–99

Saba

- Iranian Super Cup (1): 2005

Iran U23

- Asian Games Gold Medal (1): 2002

=== Manager ===
Zob Ahan

- Hazfi Cup (2): 2014–15, 2015–16
- Iranian Super Cup (1): 2016

Persepolis

- Persian Gulf Pro League (3): 2019–20, 2020–21, 2022–23
- Hazfi Cup (1): 2022–23
- Iranian Super Cup (2): 2020, 2023
- AFC Champions League runner-up: 2020

=== Individual ===
- Iranian Manager of the Season (1): 2014–15
- Navad Manager of the Month (1): August 2018

Awards and achievements
Preceded by Branko Ivanković	Iran Pro League Winning Manager; 2019–20, 2020–21	Succeeded by Farhad Majidi
Preceded by Farhad Majidi	Iran Pro League Winning Manager; 2022–23	Succeeded by TBD
