= Hossein Faraki =

Iranian footballer and manager

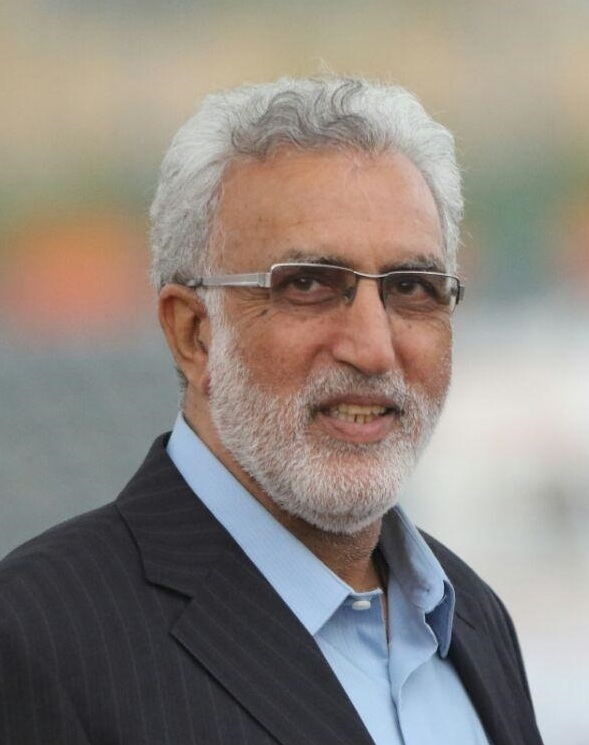
- Faraki in 2019

Personal information
- Full name: Hossein Faraki
- Date of birth: March 22, 1957 (age 69)
- Place of birth: Tehran, Iran
- Position: Striker

Senior career*
| Years | Team | Apps | (Gls) |
| 1976–1979 | Pas | | |
| 1979 | Persepolis | | |
| 1979–1981 | Al-Shaab | | |
| 1981–1992 | Pas | | |

International career
| 1977–1980 | Iran | 23 | (10) |

Managerial career
- 1994–2000: Pas (assistant)
- 2000: Pas
- 2003–2006: Iran (assistant)
- 2004: Iran U-23
- 2009–2010: Kaveh Tehran
- 2010–2012: Naft Tehran
- 2012–2014: Foolad
- 2014–2015: Sepahan
- 2016–2017: Saipa
- 2018–2020: Paykan
- * Club domestic league appearances and goals

Hossein Faraki (Persian: حسین فرکی; born 22 March 1957) is a retired Iranian football player and a coach.

== Personal life ==
He was born on 22 March 1957 in Tehran, Iran. He began playing football with PAS Tehran in 1976.

Faraki has a son named Hessam.

== Playing career ==
=== Club career ===
He spent most of his career playing for Pas Tehran. Faraki won with Pas the Iranian Takht Jamshid in 1977 and 1978; he was the top goal scorer of the Iranian league in 1978/79, when the league was left incomplete due to political unrest in Iran at the time.

Faraki also played for Al-Shaab of the UAE at the time when Heshmat Mohajerani became head coach of the club.

=== International career ===
He played for the Iran national football team and participated at the 1978 FIFA World Cup, where he played all three matches. He also reached the third place in the 1980 Asian Cup in Kuwait.

== Managerial career ==
Faraki began his coaching career as an assistant coach at Pas Tehran, the club that he played for in 1976 to 1992. He worked with many coaches like Ebrahim Ghasempour, Firouz Karimi and Bijan Zolfagharnasab. After six years as assistant coach, he was named as caretaker manager of the team after the resignation of Ghasempour in 2002. He led the team until the end of the 1999–00 season which the club ended in 7th place. He left the team after Farhad Kazemi becomes the team's head coach.

During Branko Ivankovic's time as Team Melli manager, Faraki was the assistant manager. He was also the head coach of the Iran national under-23 football team from 2003 till 2006. He was manager of Kaveh Tehran which led the club to promotion to the Azadegan League. He was appointed as head coach of Naft Tehran on 1 July 2010 and secured the team from relegation in his first season at the club. At the second season, he led the club to the 5th place, which was their best league end until 2014. He not renewed his contract with the team and signed a two years contract with Foolad on 5 June 2012. He led Foolad to the AFC Champions League for the second time since 2006 after they finished 4th in 2012–13. In 2013–14 season, Faraki's side won the league, finishing the season with 57 points, two more from runners-up Persepolis. He resigned as Foolad's manager at the end of the season because he needs an imminent knee operation.

On 9 September 2014, Faraki was named as new manager of Sepahan with signing a two-year contract, replaced Zlatko Kranjčar who resigned day before. He led Sepahan to the league title in his first season at the club. On 30 May 2015, he extended his contract with Sepahan until 2018. However, he was sacked by the club on 1 November 2015 after a run of unsuccessful results.

== Statistics ==
=== International goals ===
| # | Date | City | Opponent | Final score | Competition |
|---|---|---|---|---|---|
| 1 | 22 April 1977 | Shiraz, Iran | Saudi Arabia | 2–0 | 1978 FIFA World Cup qualification |
| 2 | 1 October 1977 | Tehran, Iran | Hungary | 3–1 | Friendly |
| 3 | 11 May 1978 | Toulouse, France | France | 1–2 | Friendly |
| 4 | 27 February 1980 | Singapore, Singapore | China | 2–2 | 1980 Summer Olympics qualification |
| 5 | 1 March 1980 | Singapore, Singapore | Singapore | 3–0 | 1980 Summer Olympics qualification |
| 6 | 1 March 1980 | Singapore, Singapore | Singapore | 3–0 | 1980 Summer Olympics qualification |
| 7 | 7 March 1980 | Singapore, Singapore | India | 2–0 | 1980 Summer Olympics qualification |
| 8 | 5 August 1980 | Al Ain, United Arab Emirates | United Arab Emirates | 2–0 | Friendly |
| 9 | 5 August 1980 | Al Ain, United Arab Emirates | United Arab Emirates | 2–0 | Friendly |
| 10 | 7 August 1980 | Abu Dhabi, United Arab Emirates | United Arab Emirates | 3–0 | Friendly |
| 11 | 7 August 1980 | Abu Dhabi, United Arab Emirates | United Arab Emirates | 3–0 | Friendly |
| 12 | 28 September 1980 | Kuwait City, Kuwait | Kuwait | 1–2 | 1980 AFC Asian Cup Semi-final |

=== Coaching career statistics ===
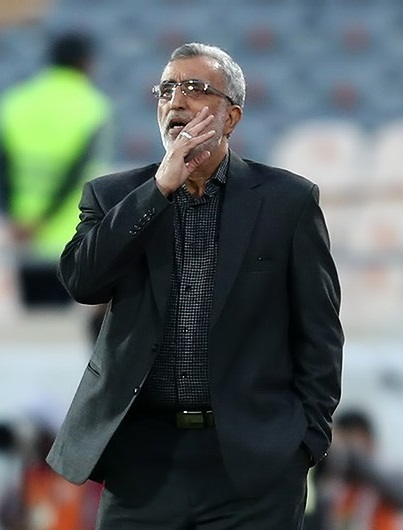
Faraki coaches his team against Persepolis, during his spell as Sepahan manager, 17 March 2015

As of 23 August 2019

| Team | From | To | Record | | | | | | | |
| Team | From | To | G | W | D | L | GF | GA | +/- | Win % |
|---|---|---|---|---|---|---|---|---|---|---|
| Pas Tehran (caretaker) | May 2000 | October 2000 | 12 | 3 | 6 | 3 | 20 | 21 | −1 | 25.00 |
| Iran U-23 (caretaker) | May 2004 | December 2004 | 5 | 4 | 0 | 1 | 9 | 3 | +6 | 80.00 |
| Kaveh Tehran | June 2009 | July 2010 | 50 | 33 | 7 | 10 | 58 | 30 | +28 | 66.00 |
| Naft Tehran | July 2010 | June 2012 | 67 | 20 | 24 | 23 | 78 | 78 | +0 | 29.85 |
| Foolad | June 2012 | June 2014 | 86 | 45 | 28 | 13 | 118 | 67 | +51 | 52.33 |
| Sepahan | September 2014 | November 2015 | 42 | 26 | 10 | 6 | 78 | 31 | +47 | 61.90 |
| Saipa | June 2016 | May 2017 | 33 | 9 | 11 | 13 | 25 | 32 | −7 | 27.27 |
| Paykan | December 2018 | January 2020 | 17 | 5 | 4 | 8 | 15 | 25 | -10 | 29.42 |
| Total | | | 310 | 153 | 85 | 72 | 374 | 269 | +105 | 49.35 |

== Honours ==
=== As a player ===
Pas

- Iranian Football League (3): 1976–77, 1977–78, 1991–92

=== As a manager ===
Kaveh

- Second Division (1): 2008–09

Foolad

- Iran Pro League (1): 2013–14

Sepahan

- Iran Pro League (1): 2014–15

=== Individual ===
- Iranian Football League top goalscorer (1): 1978–79
- Iran Football Federation Award coach of the season (3): 2013–14, 2014–15
- Iran Pro League best manager (2): 2013–14, 2014–15
- Iranian Manager of the Year (2): 2014, 2015

| Preceded by Amir Ghalenoei | Iran Pro League Winning Manager; 2013–14, 2014–15 | Succeeded by Abdollah Veisi |
