= List of Iranian Football League winning managers =

This is a list of Iranian League winning football managers.

Some managers listed have had more than one spell in charge at their current club or had spells at more than one club, however their time as manager is counted only from the date of their last appointment by their latest club. Zdravko Rajkov was the first coach who leads Taj to first ever championship in Iran. Amir Ghalenoi who won league in 2005–06, 2008–09, 2009–10, 2010–11 and 2012–13 is most decorated coach in Persian Gulf pro league.

== Seasons and winning managers ==
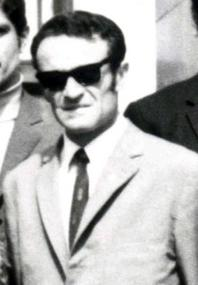
Zdravko Rajkov who won league in 1970–71 and 1973–74

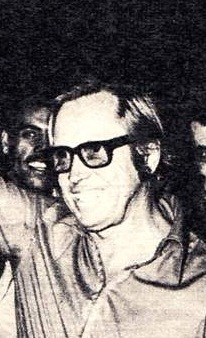
Alan Rogers who won league in 1971–72 and 1972–73

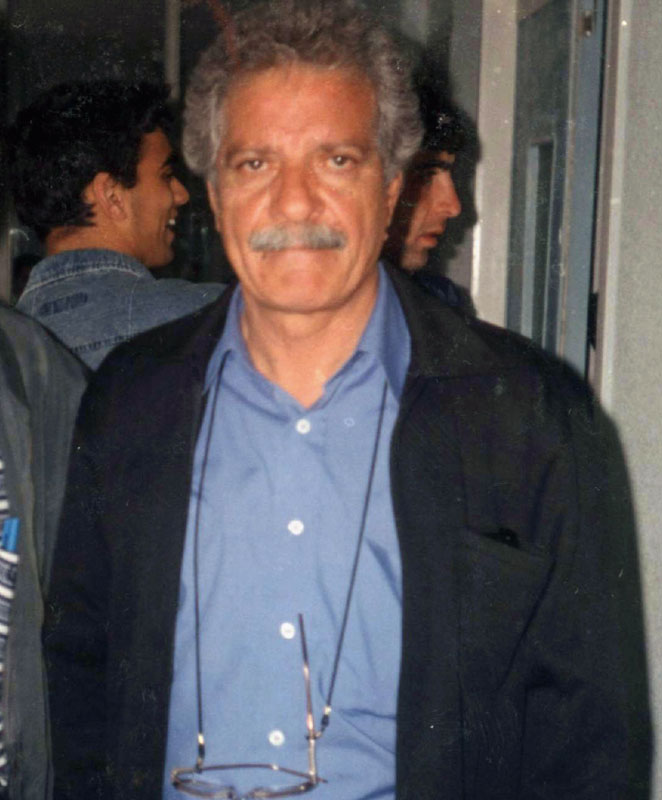
Mansour Pourheidari who won league in 1989–90 and 2000–01

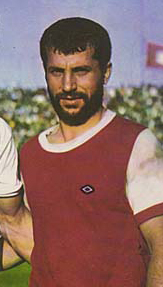
Ali Parvin who won league in 1998–99, 1999–00 and 2001–02

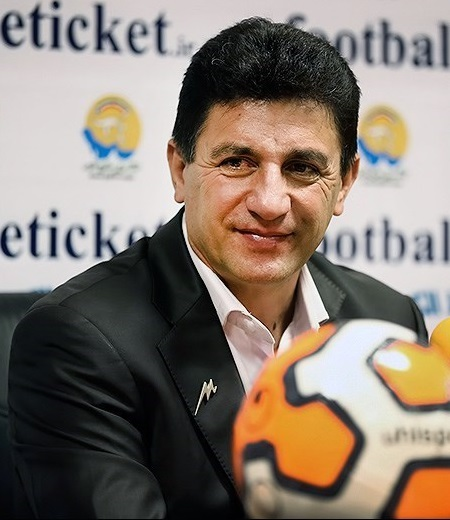
Amir Ghalenoi who won league in 2005–06, 2008–09, 2009–10, 2010–11 and 2012–13

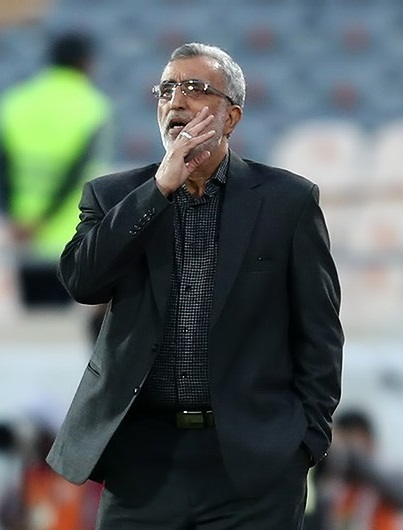
Hossein Faraki who won league in 2013–14 and 2014–15

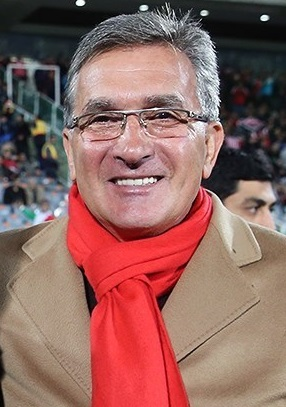
Branko Ivanković who won league in 2016–17, 2017–18 and 2018–19

Season	Nationality	Winning manager	Club
1970–71	Yugoslavia	Zdravko Rajkov	Taj
1971–72	England	Alan Rogers	Persepolis
1973–74	England	Alan Rogers	Persepolis
1974–75	Yugoslavia	Zdravko Rajkov	Taj
1975–76	Iran	Buyuk Vatankhah	Persepolis
1976–77	Iran	Hassan Habibi	Pas Tehran
1977–78	Iran	Hassan Habibi	Pas Tehran
1989–90	Iran	Mansour Pourheidari	Esteghlal
1991–92	Iran	Firouz Karimi	Pas Tehran
1992–93	Iran	Firouz Karimi	Pas Tehran
1993–94	Iran	Bijan Zolfagharnasab	Saipa
1994–95	Iran	Bijan Zolfagharnasab	Saipa
1995–96	Croatia	Stanko Poklepović	Persepolis
1996–97	Croatia	Stanko Poklepović	Persepolis
1997–98	Iran	Nasser Hejazi	Esteghlal
1998–99	Iran	Ali Parvin	Persepolis
1999–00	Iran	Ali Parvin	Persepolis
2000–01	Iran	Mansour Pourheidari	Esteghlal
2001–02	Iran	Ali Parvin	Persepolis
2002–03	Iran	Farhad Kazemi	Sepahan
2003–04	Iran	Majid Jalali	Pas Tehran
2004–05	Croatia	Mladen Frančić	Foolad
2005–06	Iran	Amir Ghalenoei	Esteghlal
2006–07	Iran	Ali Daei	Saipa
2007–08	Iran	Afshin Ghotbi	Persepolis
2008–09	Iran	Amir Ghalenoei	Esteghlal
2009–10	Iran	Amir Ghalenoei	Sepahan
2010–11	Iran	Amir Ghalenoei	Sepahan
2011–12	Croatia	Zlatko Kranjčar	Sepahan
2012–13	Iran	Amir Ghalenoei	Esteghlal
2013–14	Iran	Hossein Faraki	Foolad
2014–15	Iran	Hossein Faraki	Sepahan
2015–16	Iran	Abdollah Veisi	Esteghlal Khuzestan
2016–17	Croatia	Branko Ivanković	Persepolis
2017–18	Croatia	Branko Ivanković	Persepolis
2018–19	Croatia	Branko Ivanković	Persepolis
2019–20	Iran	Yahya Golmohammadi	Persepolis
2020–21	Iran	Yahya Golmohammadi	Persepolis
2021–22	Iran	Farhad Majidi	Esteghlal
2022–23	Iran	Yahya Golmohammadi	Persepolis
2023–24	Brazil	Osmar Loss	Persepolis
2024–25	Croatia	Dragan Skočić	Tractor

== Winning Managers performances ==
Rank	Nationality	Manager	Won	Runner-up	Years won	Years runner-up	Clubs
1	Iran	**Amir Ghalenoei**	5	4	2005–06, 2008–09, 2009–10, 2010–11, 2012–13	2003–04, 2011–12, 2017–18, 2018–19	Esteghlal, Sepahan, Tractor, Zob Ahan
2	Iran	Ali Parvin	3	3	1998–99, 1999–00, 2001–02	1989–90, 1992–93, 2000–01	Persepolis
3	Croatia	**Branko Ivanković**	3	1	2016–17, 2017–18, 2018–19	2015–16	Persepolis
3	Iran	**Yahya Golmohammadi**	3	1	2019–20, 2020–21, 2022–23	2021–22	Persepolis
5	Iran	Mansour Pourheidari	2	3	1989–90, 2000–01	1991–92, 1999–00, 2001–02	Esteghlal
6	Iran	Hassan Habibi	2	1	1976–77, 1977–78	1971–72	Pas Tehran
6	Yugoslavia	Zdravko Rajkov	2	1	1970–71, 1974–75	1973–74	Esteghlal
6	England	Alan Rogers	2	1	1971–72, 1973–74	1974–75	Persepolis
6	Iran	Firouz Karimi	2	1	1991–92, 1992–93	2006–07	Pas Tehran, Esteghlal Ahvaz
10	Iran	Bijan Zolfagharnasab	2	0	1993–94, 1994–95		Saipa
10	Croatia	Stanko Poklepović	2	0	1995–96, 1996–97		Persepolis
10	Iran	Hossein Faraki	2	0	2013–14, 2014–15		Foolad, Sepahan
13	Iran	Farhad Kazemi	1	2	2002–03	1995–96, 1996–97	Sepahan, Bahman
14	Iran	Buyuk Vatankhah	1	1	1975–76	1974–75	Persepolis
14	Iran	Nasser Hejazi	1	1	1997–98	1998–99	Esteghlal
14	Iran	Ali Daei	1	1	2006–07	2013–14	Saipa, Persepolis
17	Croatia	Mladen Frančić	1	0	2004–05		Foolad
17	Iran	Majid Jalali	1	0	2003–04		Pas Tehran
17	Iran; United States	**Afshin Ghotbi**	1	0	2007–08		Persepolis
17	Croatia	Zlatko Kranjčar	1	0	2011–12		Sepahan
17	Iran	Abdollah Veisi	1	0	2015–16		Esteghlal Khuzestan
17	Iran	**Farhad Majidi**	1	0	2021–22		Esteghlal
17	Brazil	**Osmar Loss**	1	0	2023–24		Persepolis
17	Croatia	**Dragan Skočić**	1	0	2024–25		Tractor

**Bold**	=	Still active as manager

== By nationality ==
Country	Managers	Total
Iran	16	29
Croatia	5	8
England	1	2
Yugoslavia	1	2
Brazil	1	1

== See also ==
- Iran Pro League
- Iranian football champions
- List of Iranian club football top goal scorers
- List of Hazfi Cup winning managers
- List of Iranian Super Cup winning managers
- List of Iranian Futsal League winning managers
