= Vatankhah =

Vatankhah (Persian: وطن‌خواه) is a surname. Notable people with the surname include:

- Büyük Vatankhah (born 1943), Iranian footballer and manager
- Reza Vatankhah (born 1947), Iranian footballer and manager, brother of Büyük
