= Amir Ghalenoei =

Iranian football coach and former player (born 1963)

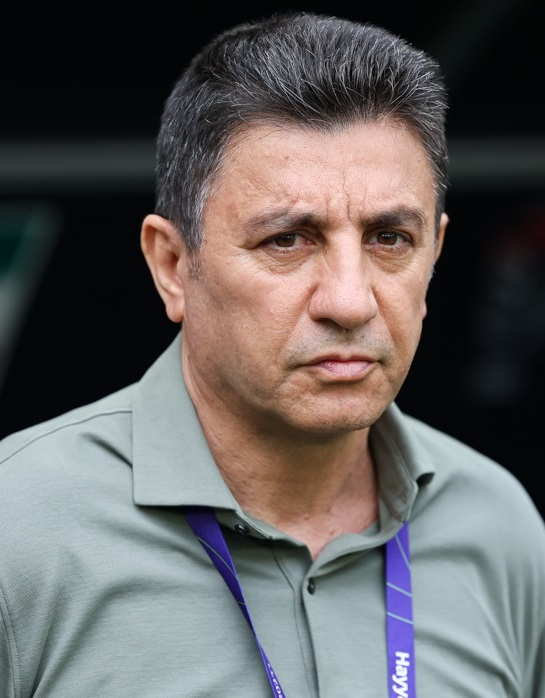
- Ghalenoei in 2024

Personal information
- Date of birth: 22 November 1963 (age 62)
- Place of birth: Tehran, Islamic republic of Iran
- Height: 1.65 m (5 ft 5 in)
- Position: Midfielder

Team information
- Current team: Iran (manager)

Youth career
- 1979–1981: Rah Ahan

Senior career*
| Years | Team | Apps | (Gls) |
| 1981–1982 | Rah Ahan | | |
| 1982–1987 | Shahin | | |
| 1987–1989 | Al-Sadd | | |
| 1989–1997 | Esteghlal | | |

International career
| 1979–1981 | Iran U-20 | | |
| 1985–1996 | Iran | 20 | (1) |

Managerial career
- 1999–2000: Keshavarz
- 2001–2002: Bargh Tehran
- 2002: Esteghlal (caretaker)
- 2002–2003: Esteghlal Ahvaz
- 2003–2006: Esteghlal
- 2006–2007: Iran
- 2008: Mes Kerman
- 2008–2009: Esteghlal
- 2009–2011: Sepahan
- 2011–2012: Tractor
- 2012–2015: Esteghlal
- 2015–2017: Tractor
- 2017–2018: Zob Ahan
- 2018–2020: Sepahan
- 2020–2023: Gol Gohar
- 2023–: Iran
Medal record
Men's football
Representing Iran (as manager)
CAFA Championships
| Winner | 2023 KGZ-UZB |
- * Club domestic league appearances and goals

Ardashir Amir Ghalenoei (Persian: اردشیر امیر قلعه‌نویی; born 22 November 1963) is an Iranian football coach and former player who is the current manager of the Iran national football team.

== Club career ==
=== Esteghlal ===
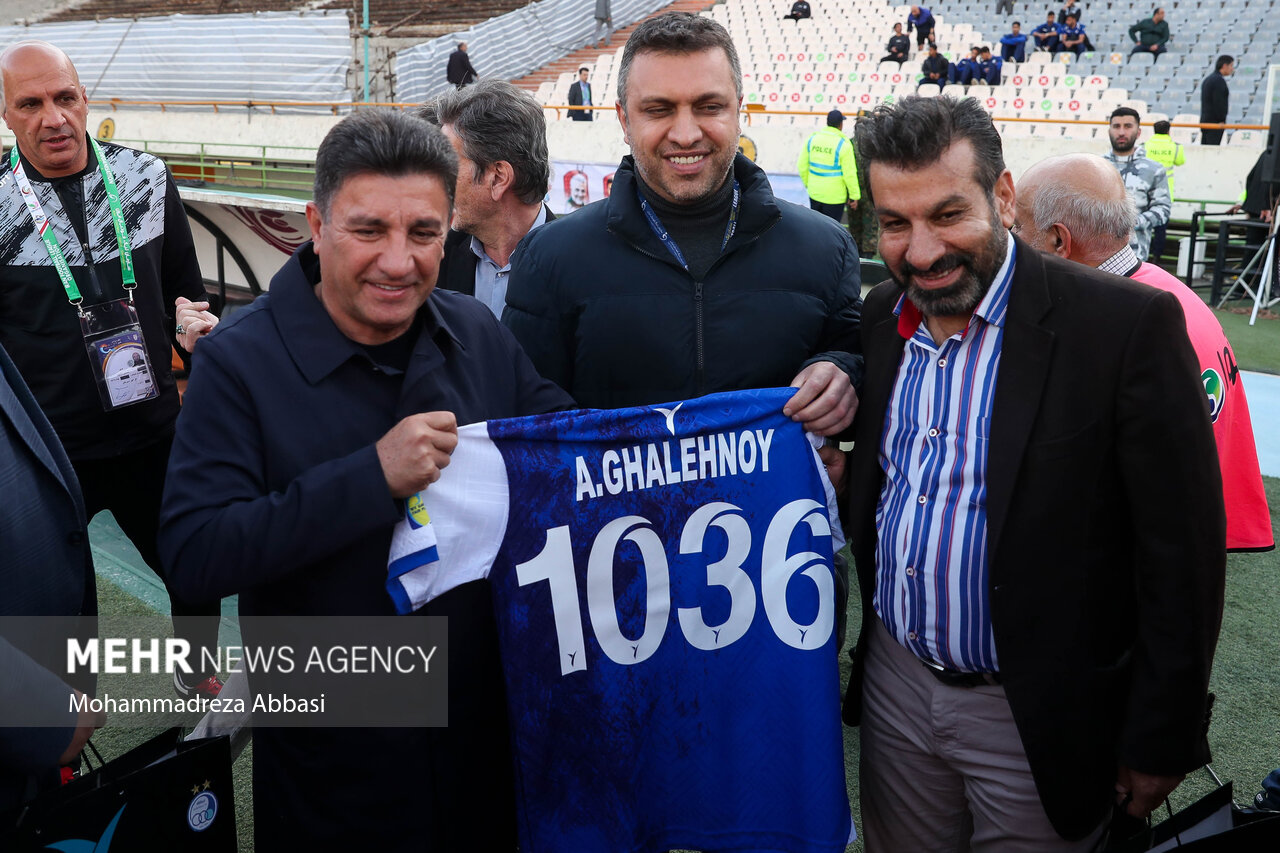
Esteghlal shirt with Ghalenoei name given to him by the club in 2023

He joined Esteghlal in July 1989 and played for the club until his retirement. He made his debut in a game against Persepolis in a quarter final Hazfi Cup match where he lost his penalty kick.

He won the Iran league title in his first full season (1989–90) at the club in spring 1990. Esteghlal also won the Asian Club Championship on the following season (1990–91) after nearly twenty years.

Ghalenoei lost most of the next season (1991–92) due to a heavy injury. At that season, Esteghlal could not obtain an entry to the next season (1992–93) of Azadegan league and thus was asked to play in the 3rd Division for one season. This meant the departure of many players like Ahmad Reza Abedzadeh, Shahrokh Bayani, Majid Namjoo-Motlagh, Samad Marfavi and Reza Ahadi but Ghalenoei remained at the team and was chosen as the club's new captain. Esteghlal again rose to the top level of Iranian football in 1994–95 and was ranked second on their first season return to the competition. Ghalenoei also scored twice in the final game of the following season (1995–96) Hazfi Cup. In his last season in Esteghlal, they started off successfully both in the Iranian and Asian Cup Winners' Cup, but could not sustain the good performance. Their head coach, Mansour Pourheidari – who had the club to the Asian glory – resigned midseason and Nasser Hejazi was appointed as the head coach and finished the league with sixth position. He retired at the end of this season after missing many matches due to injury.

== International career ==
=== International goals ===
| Date | Venue | Opponent | Result | Competition | Goals |
|---|---|---|---|---|---|
| 1996-06-18 | Kuwait City, Kuwait | Kuwait | 2–2 | Friendly | 1 |

== Managerial career ==
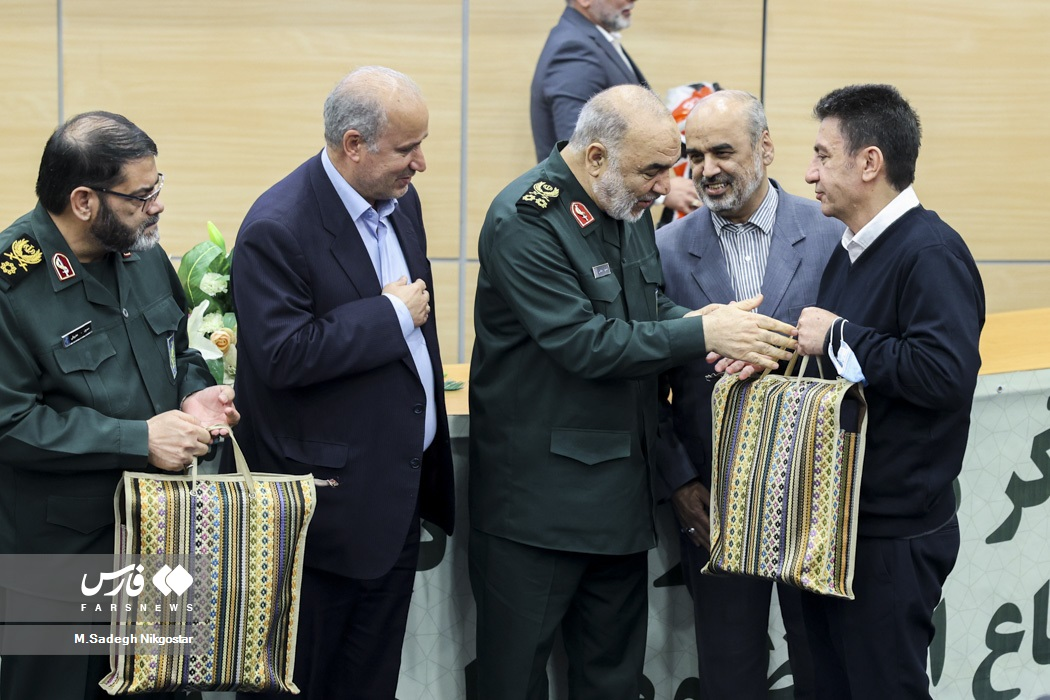
Ghalenoei meeting with IRGC commander-in-chief Hossein Salami (as Iran's manager)

=== Esteghlal Ahvaz ===
After serving as the Esteghlal's interim head coach in 5 matches in spring 2002 and winning the Hazfi cup with this team, he was appointed as Esteghlal's assistant coach for the next season (2002–03). However, he left the team before the season started and joined Esteghlal Ahvaz in the 5th week of the 2002–03 league.

=== Esteghlal Tehran ===
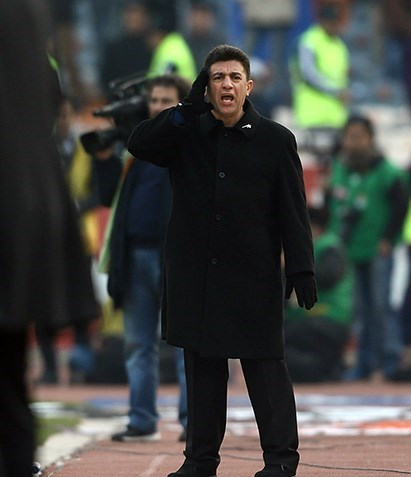
Ghalenoei managing Esteghlal at Tehran derby

He was officially named as Esteghlal's head coach before the 2003–04 season by the club chairman Mohammad Gharib. He succeeded Mansour Pourheidari who Ghalenoei was his assistant for the years. At the end of the season, Esteghlal lost the league after a defeat to Esteghlal Ahvaz, team Ghalenoei coached in 2002 in the final match.

=== First term with Iran national team ===
The Football Federation Islamic Republic of Iran appointed Ghalenoei as head coach of the Iran national football team on 17 July 2006 to succeed Branko Ivanković. After finishing first in the 2007 AFC Asian Cup qualifying two points ahead of South Korea and then finishing first in the group stage of the 2007 AFC Asian Cup Group C in Malaysia, Iran lost to South Korea in the penalty shoot-outs of the quarter-finals. Ghalenoei was heavily criticized by the press. After a period of discussion in the Iranian football federation, his contract was not renewed and national team was left with a caretaker manager for several months.

=== Mes Kerman ===
Despite being in negotiations with Uzbek League champions FC Pakhtakor Tashkent on 1 January 2008, Ghalenoei signed a contract until the end of the 2007–08 season with Iran Pro League side Mes Kerman.

=== Sepahan ===
Ghalenoei renewed his contract with Sepahan for the upcoming season, where he won the league for the third time in the row and second time with Sepahan. Sepahan had excellent performance in AFC Champions League as well and qualified for quarter final with five wins in seven matches. However, after that he left Sepahan on 4 June 2011 due to conflict with the new board director though he had led the club to the quarter finals of the AFC Champions League as the best team of the west Asian division.

=== Tractor ===
On 13 June 2011, he was named as new Tractor head coach.

== Managerial statistics ==
As of match played 17 November 2026

Managerial record by team and tenure
| Team | Nat. | From | To | Record | | | | | | | | Ref. |
| Team | Nat. | From | To | G | W | D | L | GF | GA | GD | Win % | Ref. |
|---|---|---|---|---|---|---|---|---|---|---|---|---|
| Esteghlal (caretaker) | (Iran) | 23 May 2002 | 30 June 2002 | 5 | 3 | 1 | 1 | 12 | 9 | +3 | 60.00 | |
| Esteghlal Ahvaz | (Iran) | 1 November 2002 | 30 June 2003 | 21 | 5 | 9 | 7 | 18 | 20 | −2 | 23.81 | |
| Esteghlal | (Iran) | 3 July 2003 | 18 July 2006 | 95 | 52 | 31 | 12 | 163 | 92 | +71 | 54.74 | |
| Iran | (Iran) | 19 July 2006 | 20 July 2007 | 17 | 10 | 6 | 1 | 30 | 12 | +18 | 58.82 | |
| Mes Kerman | (Iran) | 1 January 2008 | 1 June 2008 | 17 | 7 | 7 | 3 | 20 | 12 | +8 | 41.18 | |
| Esteghlal | (Iran) | 1 July 2008 | 30 June 2009 | 45 | 21 | 15 | 9 | 90 | 47 | +43 | 46.67 | |
| Sepahan | (Iran) | 1 July 2009 | 4 June 2011 | 86 | 47 | 26 | 13 | 155 | 72 | +83 | 54.65 | |
| Tractor | (Iran) | 1 July 2011 | 30 June 2012 | 35 | 19 | 10 | 6 | 57 | 32 | +25 | 54.29 | |
| Esteghlal | (Iran) | 1 July 2012 | 30 June 2015 | 121 | 64 | 32 | 25 | 165 | 99 | +66 | 52.89 | |
| Tractor | (Iran) | 10 December 2015 | 30 June 2017 | 62 | 35 | 16 | 11 | 104 | 53 | +51 | 56.45 | |
| Zob Ahan | (Iran) | 1 July 2017 | 30 June 2018 | 40 | 19 | 12 | 9 | 58 | 43 | +15 | 47.50 | |
| Sepahan | (Iran) | 1 July 2018 | 11 August 2020 | 70 | 31 | 28 | 11 | 97 | 52 | +45 | 44.29 | |
| Gol Gohar | (Iran) | 2 September 2020 | 19 March 2023 | 92 | 43 | 25 | 24 | 124 | 96 | +28 | 46.74 | |
| Iran | (Iran) | 12 March 2023 | Present | 52 | 32 | 13 | 7 | 110 | 43 | +67 | 61.54 | |
| Career Total | | | | 909 | 388 | 232 | 289 | 1,203 | 682 | +521 | 42.68 | |

== Honours ==
=== Player ===
Rahahan

- Tehran Hazfi Cup: 1980 (Runner-up)

Shahin

- Tehran League: 1985 (Runner-up), 1986 (Runner-up)

Esteghlal

- Asian Club Championship (1): 1990–91, 1991–92 (Runner-up)
- Iranian league (1): 1989–90, 1991–92 (Runner-up), 1994–95 (Runner-up)
- Hazfi Cup (1): 1990–91 (Runner-up), 1995–96
- Tehran league (1): 1989 (Runner-up), 1990 (Runner-up), 1991

Al-Sadd

- Qatar League (1): 1987–88
- Emir Cup (1): 1988

=== Manager ===
Esteghlal

- Iranian league (3): 2005–06, 2008–09, 2012–13
- Hazfi Cup (2): 2001–02, 2003–04

Sepahan

- Iranian league (2): 2009–10, 2010–11

=== Individual ===
- Asian Manager of the Year: 2007 (Runner-up)
- Iranian Manager of the Year (5): 2006, 2010, 2011, 2013, 2018
- Iran Football Federation Award coach of the season (1): 2012–13
- Navad Manager of the Month (5): January 2018, April 2018, May 2018, September 2018, October 2018

Awards and achievements
| Preceded by Mladen Frančić | Iran Pro League Winning Manager; 2005–06 | Succeeded by Ali Daei |
| Preceded by Afshin Ghotbi | Iran Pro League Winning Manager; 2008–09, 2009–10, 2010–11 | Succeeded by Zlatko Kranjčar |
| Preceded by Zlatko Kranjčar | Iran Pro League Winning Manager; 2012–13 | Succeeded by Hossein Faraki |

Sporting positions
| Preceded by Shahin Bayani | Esteghlal Tehran FC captain 1992–1997 | Succeeded by Javad Zarincheh |
