= Ali Parvin =

Iranian football player and coach

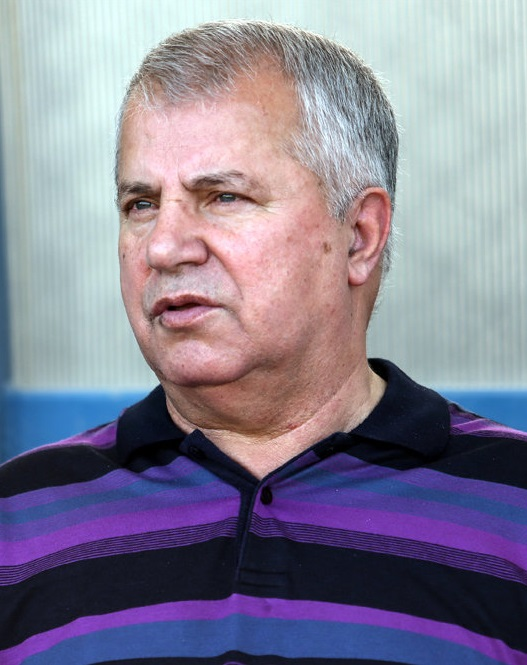
- Parvin in 2015

Personal information
- Full name: Ali Parvin
- Date of birth: 12 October 1946 (age 80)
- Place of birth: Tehran, Imperial State of Iran
- Height: 1.69 m (5 ft 6 1/2 in)
- Positions: Attacking midfielder; right winger

Youth career
- 1962–1965: Aref
- 1965: Alborz

Senior career*
Years	Team	Apps	(Gls)
1965–1968	Kian		
1968–1970	Paykan		
1970–1988	Persepolis	341	(153)

International career
1970–1980	Iran	76	(13)

Managerial career
- 1982–1993: Persepolis
- 1989–1993: Iran
- 1998–2003: Persepolis
- 2005–2006: Persepolis
- * Club domestic league appearances and goals

Ali Parvin (Persian: علی پروين; born 12 October 1946) is a retired Iranian football player and coach. He is among the most prominent Iranian footballers. He played for the Iran national football team. During his career, he played as an attacking midfielder or forward, and was associated mainly with Persepolis, playing for the team for eighteen years, managing the club on three occasions, for a combined total of for seventeen years, and also serving as the club's president.

He was selected as one of the seventeen Asian football elites by AFC and received a statue from this confederation. He was named as one of the members of Persepolis Hall of Fame and the club thanked him for his great performance during his senior career at Persepolis. The club gave him a statue of his face and named him one of the twelve great players of Persepolis in the 1970s.

== Club career ==
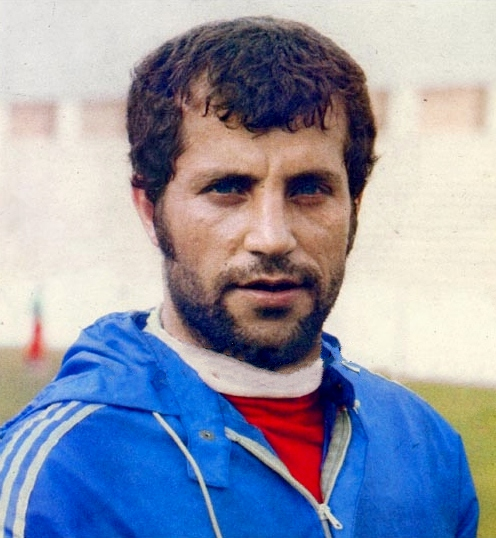
Parvin in the 1970s

=== Early career ===
Parvin was discovered whilst playing street football for his neighborhood club Aref. After being scouted, he joined Alborz FC, the reserve team of Kayan FC, where he would be called up to the senior squad quickly.

=== Senior career ===
Eventually, he joined Paykan F.C. and was one of the star players in the team in its short run in Iranian football. He later moved to Persepolis FC. As many other Paykan players did, after the club was dissolved in 1970. After the Iranian Revolution and during the Iran–Iraq War, Parvin was instrumental in helping the Persepolis club survive. By the end of his playing career, he operated in a player-manager position. He retired from competitive football in 1988.

== International career ==
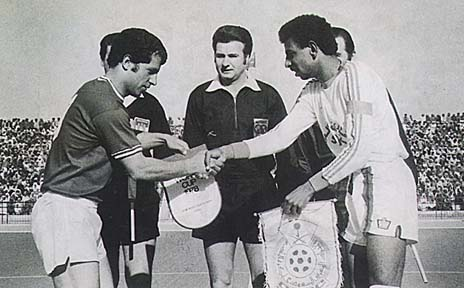
Parvin as captain of the Iran national football team in a match against Saudi Arabia

In 1970, Parvin was selected for the Iran national football team for their participation in the 1970 RCD Cup. In the tournament, he made his debut against Pakistan.

He was also part of the Iranian Asian Cup winning squads of 1972 and 1976.

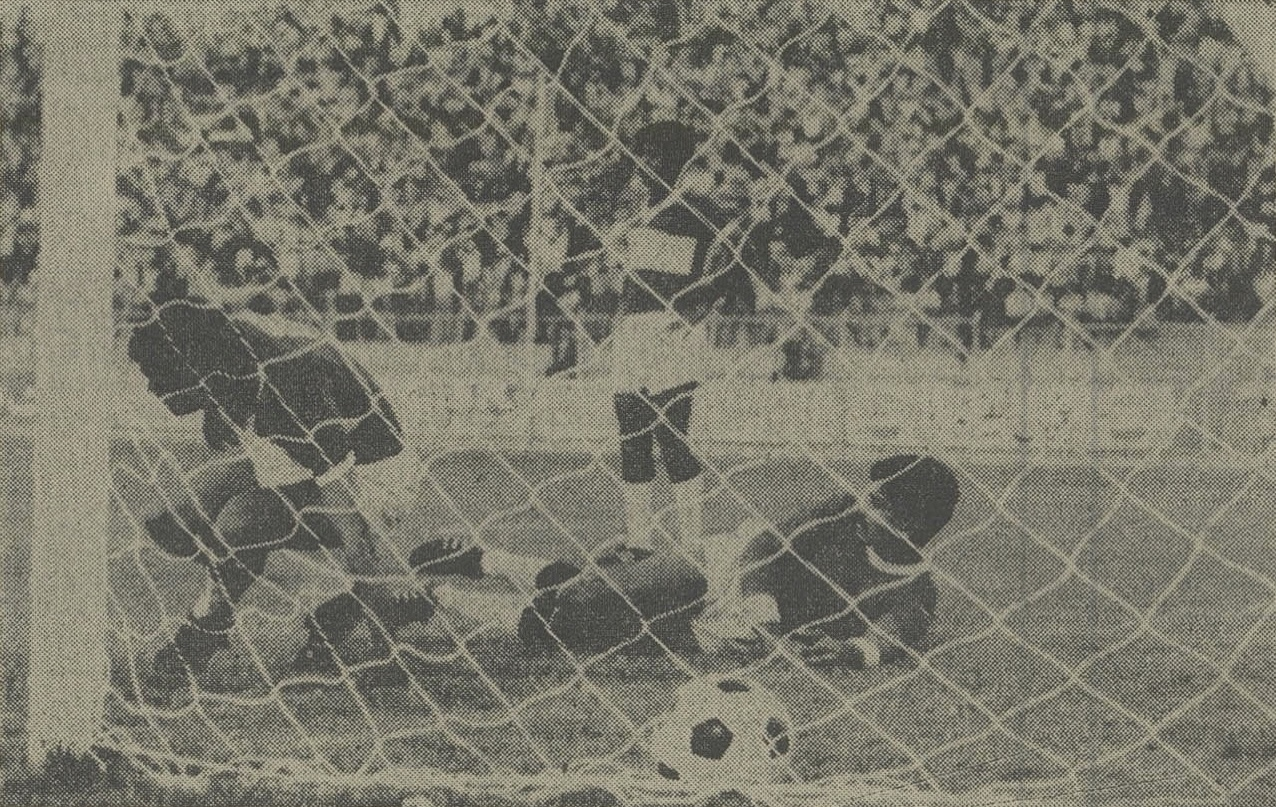
Pakistani players react to Ali Parvin's goal during a group stage match between Pakistan and Iran at the 1974 Asian Games in Tehran, Iran.

Parvin participated in the 1972 Munich Olympics and played in all three of Iran's matches. He also participated at the 1976 Montreal Olympics, again playing in all three of Iran's matches. He scored in the group game against Poland.

He retired from international football after Iran exited the 1978 World Cup in Argentina, accumulating 76 caps and 11 goals.

== Career statistics ==
=== International goals ===
#	Date	Venue	Opponent	Score	Result	Competition
1.	1 January 1972	Panathinaikos Stadium, Athens, Greece	Kuwait	2–0	Win	1972 Olympic Games Qual.
2.	1 February 1972	Panathinaikos Stadium, Athens, Greece	Kuwait	2–0	Win	1972 Olympic Games Qual.
3.	6 May 1973	Amjadiyeh Stadium, Tehran, Iran	Kuwait	2–1	Win	1974 FIFA World Cup Qual.
4.	3 September 1974	Aryamehr Stadium, Tehran, Iran	Pakistan	7–0	Win	1974 Asian Games
5.	3 September 1974	Aryamehr Stadium, Tehran, Iran	Pakistan	7–0	Win	1974 Asian Games
6.	9 September 1974	Aryamehr Stadium, Tehran, Iran	Malaysia	1–0	Win	1974 Asian Games
7.	20 August 1975	Amjadiyeh Stadium, Tehran, Iran	Bahrain	3–0	Win	1976 Olympic Games Qual.
8.	13 June 1976	Aryamehr Stadium, Tehran, Iran	Kuwait	1–0	Win	1976 AFC Asian Cup
9.	22 July 1976	Olympic Stadium, Montreal, Canada	Poland	3–2	Loss	1976 Olympic Games
10.	28 January 1977	Abbasiyyin Stadium, Damascus, Syria	Syria	0–1	Win	1978 FIFA World Cup Qual.
11.	26 April 1978	Aryamehr Stadium, Tehran, Iran	Bulgaria	1–1	Draw	Friendly
Correct as of 24 November 2018

== Managerial career ==
In late 1989 Parvin became the Iranian national team manager. He had already gained experience managing Tehran powerhouse Persepolis FC. At first his popularity grew even more as the team won the 1990 Asian Games football gold medal, but early elimination from the 1992 Asian Cup and failure to qualify for World Cup 1994 cost him his job. He was fired in 1993 and replaced by Stanko Poklepovic.

He later became the manager of Persepolis FC and helped the team to several league titles. He left the team briefly in the 2003–04 season but returned the year after as the technical director of the team. After a poor start for Persepolis in the 2005–06 season, he again became the manager, only to leave at the end of the season due to the club's poor form.

=== Statistics ===
Nat	Team	From	To	Record				
Nat	Team	From	To	G	W	D	L	Win %
(Iran)	Persepolis	February 1982	November 1993	317	200	99	18	63.09
(Iran)	Iran	November 1989	October 1993	34	15	11	8	44.12
(Iran)	Persepolis	September 1998	June 2003	130	71	45	14	54.62
Total				501	291	165	45	58.08

==== List of seasons ====
- ACW = Asian Cup Winners' Cup
- TPL = Tehran Provincial League
- THC = Tehran Hazfi Cup
- TSC = Tehran Super Cup

Champions	Runners-up	Third / SF	Unfinished

Season	Club	Domestic					International		Trophies
Season	Club	League	TPL	Cup	THC	TSC	ACL	ACW	Trophies
1981–82	Persepolis		RU		W				1
1982–83	Persepolis		W						1
1983–84	Persepolis		RU						0
1984–85	Persepolis								0
1985–86	Persepolis		5th						0
1986–87	Persepolis		W	R16	W				2
1987–88	Persepolis		W	W					2
1988–89	Persepolis		W	SF			QR		1
1989–90	Persepolis	RU	W						1
1990–91	Persepolis		W	SF				W	2
1991–92	Persepolis	3rd	RU	W					1
1992–93	Persepolis	RU						RU	0
1993–94	none								
1994–95	none								
1995–96	none								
1996–97	none								
1997–98	none								
1998–99	Persepolis	W		W					2
1999–00	Persepolis	W					3rd		1
2000–01	Persepolis	RU		R16			3rd		0
2001–02	Persepolis	W		QF					1
2002–03	Persepolis	RU		R16			GS		0
2003–04	none								
2004–05	none								
2005–06	Persepolis	9th		R					0

== Administrative roles ==
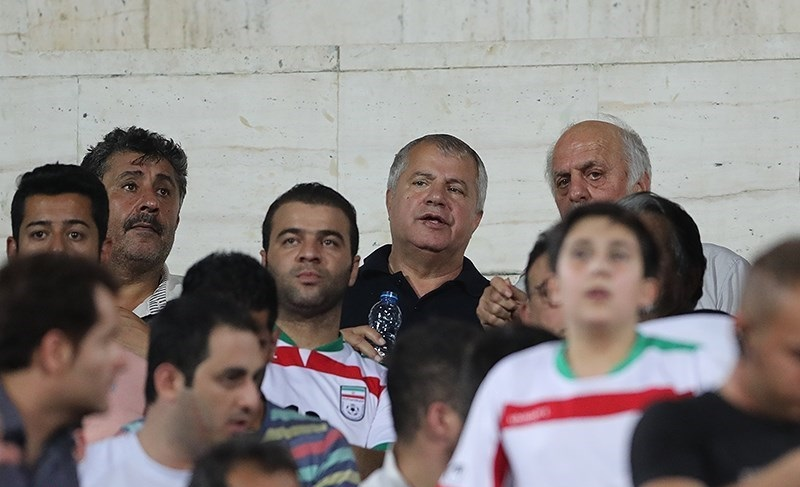
Parvin (in center) watching Iran national team's match against Qatar in 2018 FIFA World Cup qualification

On 30 April 2007, Ali Parvin led the takeover of Azadegan League club Ekbatan, which was renamed Steel Azin. He also became one of the members of the board of directors. He was elected as Chairman of Steel Azin on 1 December 2010 but resigned after the team was Relegated to the Azadegan League on 15 June 2011. He was also acting chairman of Persepolis from May to October 2001. As of 19 September 2011, Ali Parvin is one of the members of the board of directors of Persepolis, serving for the second time. On 22 January 2014, and after the resignation of Mohammad Rouyanian as the club's chairman, Parvin was appointed as the club's interim chairman.

== Honours ==
=== As a player ===
==== Club ====
Paykan

- Tehran Province League:
  - Winner (1): 1969

Persepolis

- Iranian Football League:
  - Winner (3): 1972, 1974, 1976
  - Runner-up (3): 1975, 1977, 1978
- Espandi Cup:
  - Winner (1): 1979
- Tehran Province League:
  - Winner (3): 1983, 1987, 1988
  - Runner-up (2): 1982, 1984
- Tehran Hazfi Cup
  - Winner (2): 1982, 1987
  - Runners-up (1): 1981

==== International ====
- AFC Asian Cup:
  - Winner (2): 1972, 1976
- Asian Games:
  - Gold Medal (1): 1974

==== Individual ====
- AFC Asian Cup Most Valuable Player: 1976

=== As a manager ===
Persepolis

- Asian Cup Winners' Cup:
  - Winner (1): 1991
  - Runner-up (1): 1993
- Iranian Football League:
  - Winner (3): 1998-99, 1999-2000, 2001-02
  - Runner-up (3): 1989-90, 1992-93, 2000-01
- Hazfi Cup:
  - Winner (3): 1987–88, 1991–92, 1998-99
- Tehran Province League:
  - Winner (6): 1983, 1987, 1988, 1989, 1990, 1991
  - Runner-up (3): 1982, 1984, 1992
- Tehran Hazfi Cup:
  - Winner (2): 1982, 1987

Iran

- Asian Games:
  - Winner (1): 1990

==== Individual ====
- Iranian Manager of the Year: 2000, 2002
- Persepolis Hall of Fame (Manager): 2013
- Golden elite of Asian Football Federation: 2013
- Iranian Football Hall of Fame (Manager): 2014

He was selected as one of the seventeen Asian football elites by the AFC and received a statute from this confederation. He was named as one of the members of Persepolis Hall of Fame and the club thanked him for his great performance during his senior career at Persepolis. The club gave him a statue of his face and named him one of the twelve great players of Persepolis in the 1970s.

== Personal life ==
Parvin married in 1976. He has two daughters and one son. His son, Mohammad Parvin is a former footballer who played for Persepolis and Paykan. He, along with his wife and the family of his children, lives in a house that he built in the Lavasan area near Tehran.

Awards and achievements
Preceded by Nasser Hejazi	Iran Pro League Winning Manager; 1998–99, 1999–00	Succeeded by Mansour Pourheidari
Preceded by Mansour Pourheidari	Iran Pro League Winning Manager; 2001–02	Succeeded by Farhad Kazemi
