= Mohammad Hossein Memar =

Iranian Football player (born 1972)

Hussein Memar
Personal information
- Full name: Muhammad Hussein Memar
- Date of birth: January 5, 1972 (age 54)
- Place of birth: Iran
- Position: Defender

Team information
- Current team: Zob Ahan

Senior career*
Years	Team	Apps	(Gls)
-1996	Fath Tehran		
1996–2000	Bahman		
2000–2003	Paykan		
2003–2006	Saipa		(0)
2006–2010	Paykan	104	(0)
2010–2011	Damash Lorestan		
- * Club domestic league appearances and goals

Muhammad Hussein Memar also known as Hussein Memar was born and raised in Tehran, Iran. His cousin Mahmoud Memar also was a famous national football player of Iran. He started playing football in 1988, and joined Vahdat football club as a young player. His coach at the time was Majid Jalali. He played for Fath football club then. Fath was a very famous club and had players like Khodadad Azizi, Behrouz Rahbari Fard, Yadollah Akbari, etc. Hussein Memar played for the famous Iranian coaches Homayoun Shahrokhi and Hussein Faraki in Fath. He was transferred to Bahman in 1997, and played in Azadegan League under the coaching of Farhad Kazemi with Hamid Estilli, Asghar Modir Rousta, Khodadad Azizi, Muhammad Khakpour, etc.

In 2000, he was transferred to Emirate Football League to Alzeyd Sharje and played for Homayoun Shahrokhi again. He played for Paykan for seven years with Hamid Alidousti, Bijan Zolfaghar Nasab and Hamid Derakhshan. He played for Damash Gilan and Nirooye Zamini before he retired as a player.

He went on to study and attend coaching classes, and got his AFC A, B, C and D degrees in coaching. He has worked with Mehdi Tartar as assisting coach in Pasr Jonoubi, Naft Masjed Soleyman, Paykan; and now he is working in Zob Ahan.

== AFC Coaching Certificates ==
Hussein Memar has achieved:

- AFC "A" Coaching license Certificate

- AFC "B" Coaching license Certificate

- AFC "C" Coaching license Certificate

- AFC "D" Coaching license Certificate

== Club career ==
=== Club career statistics ===
As of June 2007

Club performance
Season	Club	League
Iran
1987-1992	Vahdat	
1992-1996	Fath	
1996-1999	bahman	
1999-2000	sharjeh	
2000-2005	Paykan	Persian Gulf Cup
2005-2007	Saipa	Persian Gulf Cup
2007-2010	Paykan	
Total	Iran	
Career total

== Coaching Experiences ==
Coaching career
	Team	Year	Position
1	Esteghlal Abi	2014-2015	Coach
2	Badran	2015-2016	Coach
3	Pars Jam Bushehr	2017-2019	Coach
4	Naft Masjed Soleyman	2019-2020	Coach
5	Paykan Tehran	2020-2021	Coach
6	Zobahan Isfahan	2021-2022	Coach
