= Zlatko Ivanković =

Croatian football coach (born 1952)

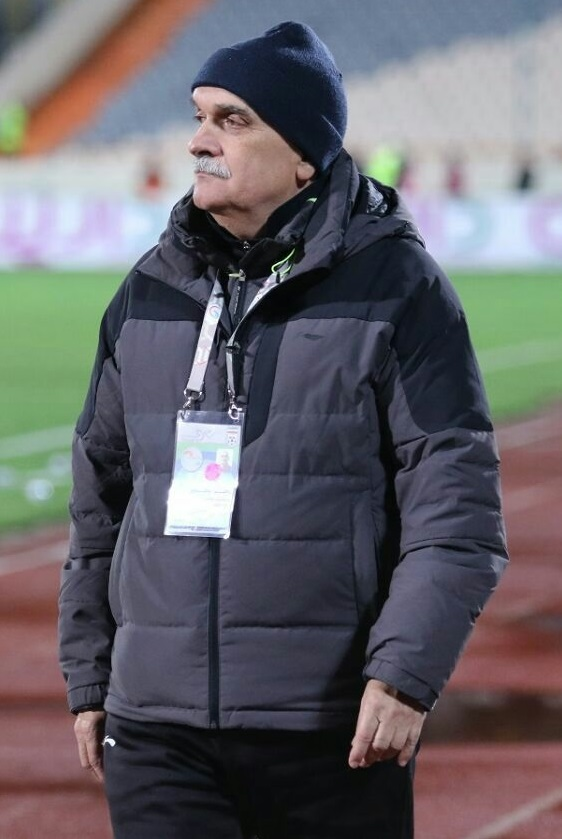
- Ivanković in February 2019

Personal information
- Full name: Zlatko Ivanković
- Date of birth: 9 October 1952 (age 74)
- Place of birth: Croatia

Managerial career
- Years: Team
- 1986–1989: Sloboda Varaždin
- 1989–2000: Varteks (Academy manager, Youth coach)
- 2000–2001: Sloboda Varaždin
- 2001–2002: Koprivnica
- 2002–2005: Slaven Belupo (Academy manager, Youth coach)
- 2005–2006: Bargh Shiraz
- 2006–2010: Sloboda Varaždin
- 2010–2011: Ormož
- 2012–2015: Varteks (Club manager and U16)
- 2017–2019: Persepolis (Assistant coach)
- 2019: Al-Ahli (Assistant coach)
- 2020–2024: Oman (Assistant coach)

Zlatko Ivanković (born 9 October 1952) is a Croatian football coach. He is the brother of former national team coach Branko Ivanković.

== Career in Iran ==
He managed Iranian club Bargh Shiraz, but was replaced by Bijan Zolfagharnasab at the end of the 2005–2006 season.

== Career ==
- NK Slaven Belupo Youth (2002–2005)
- Bargh Shiraz F.C. (2005–2006)
- NK Sloboda Varaždin
- Persepolis F.C.
- Al-Ahli Saudi FC
- Oman national football team
