= Büyük Vatankhah =

Iranian footballer and manager

Personal information
- Full name: Ezatollah Vatankhah
- Date of birth: February 1, 1942 (age 84)
- Place of birth: Tabriz, Iran
- Height: 5 ft 10 in (1.78 m)
- Position: Centre back

Youth career
- 1955_1957: Rah Ahan

Senior career*
Years	Team	Apps	(Gls)
1957–1959	Rah Ahan	18	(3)
1959–1961	Deyhim	26	(4)
1961–1967	Shahin	95	(8)
1967–1975	Persepolis	137	(12)

International career
1965	Iran	2	(0)

Managerial career
- 1975–1976: Persepolis
- * Club domestic league appearances and goals

Büyük Vatankhah (Persian: بیوک وطنخواه) or Ezzatollah Vatankhah (Persian: عزت الله وطنخواه) (born February 1, 1942, in Tabriz, Iran) is a retired Iranian football player and currently a scouter. He has played in Rah Ahan, Deyhim, Shahin and Persepolis. After he retired in 1972, he became manager of Persepolis U20 team and then selected as first-team manager in 1975. He is the first Iranian manager that could win Iranian top division league. His younger brother, Reza, was a team mate at Persepolis for many years.

Büyük Vatankhah is part of the first generation of contemporary Iranian football players. According to interviews he has given to Iranian press, football was his passion from an early age, a sentiment which angered his traditional father who wanted his son to pursue more "mainstream" activities. In the early 1950s in Iran, playing football beyond a certain age was very much stigmatised. He was only 17 when he first played for the Iranian national team, and it was only then he told his family about his great passion. His career took off after he began to play for Shahin and then played for Paykan only to later return to Shahin and soon thereafter join the start-up Persepolis. He is one of the original Persepolisis. He continues to live in his beloved Tehran, although he has made many visits to Europe and the Persian Gulf States.

Büyük has a son, Alex Vatankha, currently a Senior Fellow at Middle East Institute and Jamestown Foundation.

== Notes ==
- Büyük Vatankhah at National-Football-Teams.com

Awards and achievements
Preceded by Alan Rogers	Iran Pro League Winning Manager; 1975–76	Succeeded by Hassan Habibi
