= Chicago Spurs =

Defunct American soccer club

- Full name: Chicago Spurs
- Nickname: Spurs
- Founded: 1966
- Dissolved: 1967 (relocated)
- Stadium: Soldier Field, Chicago, Illinois
- Capacity: 61,500
- Owner(s): (United States) Michael Butler (United States) Al Kaczamarek (United States) William Cutler
- Head coach: (England) Alan Rogers
- League: National Professional Soccer League
- 1967: 3rd, Western Division; Playoffs: DNQ
Home colors	Away colors

Chicago Spurs were an American soccer team that was a charter member of the non-FIFA sanctioned National Professional Soccer League (NPSL) in 1967. The team was based in Chicago, Illinois and played their home games at the Soldier Field. When the NPSL merged with the rival United Soccer Association to form the North American Soccer League, the team moved and became the Kansas City Spurs, leaving the Chicago market to the Chicago Mustangs.

== History ==
In 1966, several groups of entrepreneurs were exploring the idea of forming a professional soccer league in United States and Canada. Two of these groups merged to form the National Professional Soccer League (NPSL) and franchise rights were awarded to ten ownership groups. The Chicago franchise was awarded to Michael Butler and William Cutler, the partners appointed Alvis Kaczmarek to manage the team as team president. In October, Kaczmarek hired Alan Rogers to coach the new team. The Spurs opened the 1967 season at Soldier Field with a 1–0 victory over the St. Louis Stars with 4,725 fans in attendance. The team finished the season in third place of the Western Division with a record of ten wins, eleven loses and eleven draws, with an average attendance of 2,619.

Following the 1967 season, the NPSL merged with the United Soccer Association (USA) to form the North American Soccer League (NASL). The new league decided against two-team cities, and in order to keep from competing with the Chicago Mustangs of the former USA, owned by White Sox co-owner Arthur Allyn Jr., who were chosen to be the city's NASL representative, the Spurs were sold to a group from Kansas City, Missouri and moved there to become the Kansas City Spurs.

== Media coverage ==
CBS broadcast 5 matches, all on the road, with Jack Whitaker and Danny Blanchflower providing commentary. WBBM-TV was the local CBS broadcaster. 12 matches were broadcast locally, including 7 home matches, on WGN-TV, with Lloyd Pettit announcing. There does not appear to have been any radio coverage.

== Year-by-year ==
Year	Division	W	L	T	Pts	League	Playoffs	Avg. attendance
1967	NPSL	10	11	11	142	3rd, Western Division	Did not qualify	2,619

== Coaches ==
- (England) Alan Rogers

== See also ==
- Kansas City Spurs
- Chicago Mustangs (1967–68)
- Chicago Sting
- Chicago Fire Soccer Club
