= Amir Mirbozorgi =

Iranian footballer

Personal information
- Full name: Amir Mirbozorgi
- Date of birth: August 27, 1986 (age 40)
- Place of birth: Iran
- Position: Midfielder

Team information
- Current team: Baadraan
- Number: 8

Senior career*
Years	Team	Apps	(Gls)
2008–2016	Paykan	163	(15)
2016–2018	Oxin Alborz	53	(12)
2018	Oxin Alborz	9	(0)
2018–2019	Pars Jonoubi	11	(0)
2019–	Baadraan	0	(0)
- * Club domestic league appearances and goals as of 26 August 2016

Amir Mirbozorgi (born August 27, 1986) is an Iranian footballer who played for Aluminium Arak of the Azadegan League.

== Club career ==
Mirbozorgi has been with Paykan F.C. since 2008

=== Club career statistics ===
As of 19 October 2010

Club performance			League		Cup		Continental		Total	
Season	Club	League	Apps	Goals	Apps	Goals	Apps	Goals	Apps	Goals
Iran			League		Hazfi Cup		Asia		Total	
2008–09	Paykan	Persian Gulf Cup	18	1			-	-		
2009–10	Paykan	Persian Gulf Cup	14	0			-	-		
2010–11	Paykan	Persian Gulf Cup	6	3	1	0	-	-	7	3
Total	Iran		38	4			0	0		
Career total			38	4			0	0		

- Assist Goals

Season	Team	Assists
10–11	Paykan	0
