= Lorraine Rogers =

British sports executive

- Born: February 22, 1963 (age 63); Liverpool

Lorraine Rogers is a former Chairwoman of Tranmere Rovers F.C.

She is also a member of the Football League board.

Lorraine Rogers is the niece of Alan Rogers, a well travelled football manager who enjoyed success in Iran and Cyprus during his career.
