= Alan Rogers (football manager) =

English football manager (1923–2022)

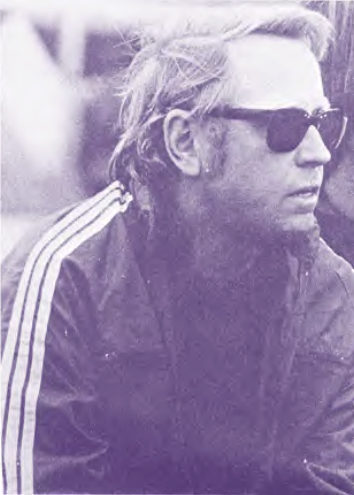

Personal information
- Full name: Albert Garnet I. M. M. Rogers
- Date of birth: 20 October 1923
- Place of birth: West Derby, Lancashire, England
- Date of death: 25 August 2022 (aged 98)
- Place of death: Sefton, England

Managerial career
- Years: Team
- 1962–1963: Philippines
- 1963: Bloemfontein City
- 1963–1965: Basutoland
- 1965–1966: Uganda
- 1966–1967: Chicago Spurs
- 1969–1970: Paykan
- 1970: Kansas City Spurs
- 1971: Washington Darts
- 1971–1974: Persepolis
- 1976: Shahbaz
- 1978: Þór Akureyri

Albert Garnet I. M. M. Rogers (20 October 1923 – 25 August 2022), better known as Alan Rogers, was an English football manager who was Head-Coach of Persepolis F.C. between 1971 and 1974. Persepolis F.C., an Iranian football club then played in the Takht Jamshid Cup.

Rogers held coaching positions in the Philippines, South Africa, Iran, the US, Qatar, Zambia, Libya, Uganda and Iceland.

Rogers and Frank O'Farrell arrived in Tehran on 17 January 2006 upon invitation from Persepolis F.C.

== Career ==
After serving as a gunner on Arctic convoys in World War II, Rogers began a football management career that spanned 16 countries. Following his first club managerial role as head of the Philippine national football team in 1962–63, Rogers moved to South Africa where he worked for FIFA. Afterwards, he made the move to the United States where he helped launch the Chicago Spurs of the National Premier Soccer League for their lone season in 1967. He would return to coach the same club in 1970, which had been relocated and renamed the Kansas City Spurs upon joining the new North American Soccer League in 1968. Rogers arrived in Iran in 1969 for the first time and coached Paykan F.C. which was an extremely prosperous club at the time and had some of the best facilities in Iran. Rogers became champions with Paykan, following which he spent some time in America. Following his return to Iran he became coach of Persepolis F.C. in 1971 and became league champions with the club on two occasions.

== Personal life and death ==
Rogers was born in West Derby (then part of Lancashire) on 20 October 1923. He was the uncle of former Tranmere Rovers chairwoman Lorraine Rogers.

In later life, Rogers resided in a flat in Southport. He died in Sefton on 25 August 2022, at the age of 98.

== Achievements ==
- Winner: Iran Friendship Cup, March 1970 with Paykan F.C.

This tournament was league-format where Paykan won 2 games and lost 1. Results were as follow: Paykan defeated Adana Demirspor 2–1 and FC Universitatea Craiova 1–0, lost to CSKA Moscow 3–2.

- Winner: Tehran Football Championship 1969–1970 with Paykan F.C.
- Winner: Takht Jamshid League with Persepolis F.C.

=== Orders ===

Arctic Star: 2013

Awards and achievements
Preceded by Zdravko Rajkov	Iran Pro League Winning Manager; 1971–72, 1973–74	Succeeded by Zdravko Rajkov
