= Abdollah Veisi =

Iranian footballer and coach

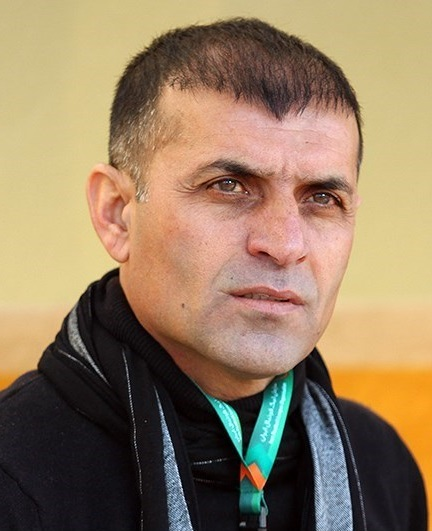
- Veisi in 2016

Personal information
- Full name: Abdollah Veisi
- Date of birth: March 22, 1971 (age 55)
- Place of birth: Ramhormoz, Iran
- Height: 1.78 m (5 ft 10 in)
- Position: Right back

Senior career*
Years	Team	Apps	(Gls)
1988–1991	Shahin Ahvaz		
1991–1992	Jonub Ahvaz		
1992–1994	Esteghlal Ahvaz		
1994–1998	Sepahan		
1998–1999	Foolad		
1999–2002	Sepahan		
2002–2004	Foolad		

International career
2000	Iran	1	(0)

Managerial career
- 2006–2007: Foolad (assistant)
- 2007: Foolad (interim)
- 2008–2009: Saba Qom (assistant)
- 2010–2012: Saba Qom
- 2012–2013: Paykan
- 2013–2016: Esteghlal Khuzestan
- 2016–2017: Sepahan
- 2017–2018: Esteghlal Khuzestan
- 2018: Naft Masjed Soleyman
- 2019: Shahin Bushehr
- 2020: Paykan
- 2021: Foolad
- 2021–2022: Kheybar Khorramabad
- 2023: Sanat Naft
- 2024: Foolad
- 2024–2025: Palayesh Naft
- 2026: Zob Ahan
- * Club domestic league appearances and goals

Abdollah Veisi (Persian: عبدالله ویسی, born 22 March 1971 in Ramhormoz, Khuzestan Province) is an Iranian retired football player and manager, who is currently manager of Foolad in Persian Gulf Pro League.

== Playing career ==
Veisi spent the Azadegan League 1999–2000 season and the Azadegan League 2000–01 playing for Sepahan, scoring two goals. In the following season, he transferred to Foolad.

== Managerial career ==
=== Early years ===
In mid-2006, Veisi became assistant coach of Foolad. After the departure of Mohammad Mayeli Kohan, Veisi was appointed the manager of Foolad for the remainder of the season. He was soon replaced by Nenad Nikolić, in a season which saw Foolad relegated to the Azadegan League.

=== Saba Qom and Paykan ===
In 2009, he moved to Saba Battery, becoming the team's assistant coach, under the helm of Rasoul Korbekandi. After the team moved to Qom, he became the technical director and was eventually promoted to manager when Mahmoud Yavari was released from his contract. He kept Saba safe from the relegation zone in 2010–11 season but went on to produce very good results with the team in next season. This ended with the team finishing the season in 4th place and they qualified for the AFC Champions League. He left the team at the end of the season. He signed a two-year contract with newly promoted Paykan on 14 May 2012 but was sacked on 27 January 2013 after a series of bad results.

=== Esteghlal Khuzestan ===
On 18 May 2013, he became head coach of another newly promoted team, Esteghlal Khuzestan. He led Esteghlal Khuzestan to 12th position in his first season, three points better than the relegation zone. In the second season, Esteghlal Khuzestan bought Rouhollah Seifollahi, Mohammad Reza Mahdavi, Soumbeïla Diakité, Mehdi Seyed Salehi, Meysam Baou and released Fábio Carvalho, Sohrab Bakhtiarizadeh, Adel Kolahkaj and Milad Meydavoudi. However, Veisi finished the season in the 14th position with Esteghlal Khuzestan, placing them in the relegation play-off which they faced Mes Kerman. Esteghlal Khuzestan won the play-off 3–0 on aggregate thanks to goals from Mehdi Momeni and Lamine Diawara (twice) and kept their Persian Gulf Pro League spot.

Veisi extended his contract until 2018 after the end of the season and started promoting young talents from the academy and Foolad Novin to the first squad. They started the season with three consecutive wins which was continued with four consecutive winning streaks in the 12th week, which made Esteghlal Khuzestan finish champions of the first half of the season. After a great result with Veisi, Esteghlal Khuzestan managed to keep their shape at the second half of the season. On 1 January 2016, Esteghlal Khuzestan lost to Persepolis which made the race tighter for first place and also made Esteghlal Khuzestan fall to second place, Esteghlal became first after 17th week. Veisi later said that our main goal is to take place at AFC Champions League. On 8 May 2016, Esteghlal Khuzestan qualified to the AFC Champions League for the first time after a 1–0 win over Padideh, which led Esteghlal Khuzestan to the top of the league with one game remaining. On 13 May 2016, Veisi won Iran Pro League title with Esteghlal Khuzestan after a 2–0 win over Zob Ahan. He was named as Iran Pro League best manager of the season after the end of the tournament.

=== Sepahan ===
On 23 May 2016, Veisi was named as new Sepahan manager with signing a four-year contract. He was sacked on 17 March 2017 after a series of bad results, placing Sepahan in the 7th place.

=== Return to Esteghlal Khuzestan ===
Veisi returned to Esteghlal Khuzestan in June 2017 by signing a two-year contract.

=== Statistics ===
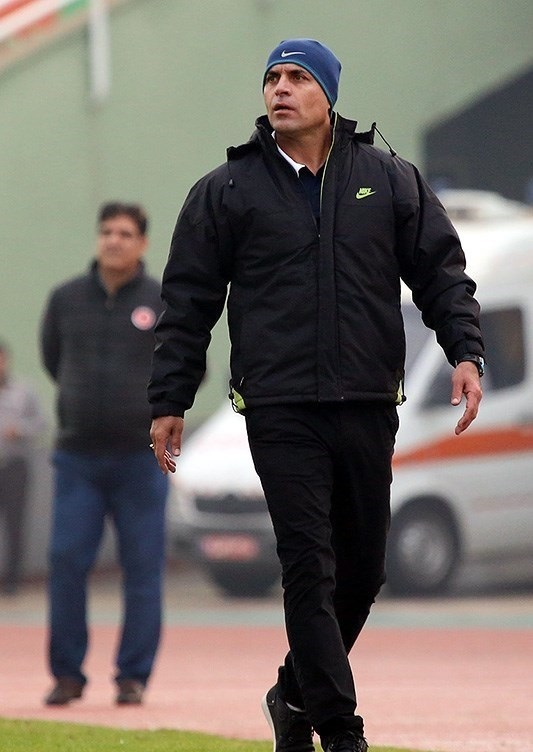
Veisi managing Esteghlal Khuzestan in an IPL match against Padideh, 9 February 2016

As of 10 October 2019

Team	From	To	Record							
Team	From	To	G	W	D	L	GF	GA	+/-	Win %
Foolad	July 2007	December 2007	12	6	5	1	23	5	+18	50.00
Saba Qom	November 2010	May 2012	55	17	23	15	67	64	+3	30.91
Paykan	May 2012	January 2013	23	5	5	13	18	46	−28	21.74
Esteghlal Khuzestan	May 2013	May 2016	132	55	47	30	142	121	+21	41.67
Sepahan	May 2016	March 2017	29	12	8	9	37	32	+5	41.38
Esteghlal Khuzestan	June 2017	June 2018	34	10	10	14	37	48	−11	29.41
Naft MIS	July 2018	September 2018	5	0	3	2	0	3	−3	0.00
Shahin Bushehr	February 2019	October 2019	18	5	7	6	15	20	−5	27.78
Total			302	109	106	87	332	324	+8	36.09

== Honours ==
=== Manager ===
Esteghlal Khuzestan

- Persian Gulf Pro League (1): 2015–16
- Azadegan League (1): 2012–13

Shahin Bushehr

- Azadegan League promotion (1): 2018–19

=== Individual ===
- Persian Gulf Pro League Best Manager (1): 2015–16
- IFCA Best Manager of the Year (1): 2016
- IRFF Awards Manager of the Season (1): 2015–16
- Iranian Manager of the Year (1): 2016

== Trivia ==
He became the subject of comparisons drawn between his likeness to famous ex Bayern München coach, Pep Guardiola by Iranian media.

Awards and achievements
Preceded by Hossein Faraki	Iran Pro League Winning Manager; 2015–16	Succeeded by Branko Ivanković
