= Mansour Pourheidari =

Iranian footballer and coach (1946–2016)

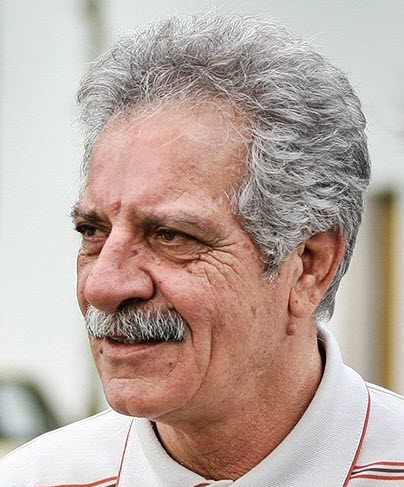

Personal information
- Date of birth: 26 January 1946
- Place of birth: Tehran, Iran
- Date of death: 4 November 2016 (aged 70)
- Place of death: Tehran, Iran
- Position: Defender

Youth career
- 1962–1965: Daraei

Senior career*
Years	Team	Apps	(Gls)
1965–1975	Taj		
1975–1977	Daraei		

International career
1970–1971	Iran	0	(0)

Managerial career
- 1983–1986: Esteghlal
- 1986–1989: Al-Ahli
- 1989–1992: Esteghlal
- 1995–1996: Esteghlal
- 1996–1998: Fajr Sepasi
- 1998–2000: Iran
- 2000–2002: Esteghlal
- 2002–2003: Sanat Naft
Medal record
Representing Iran
Asian Games
Gold medal – first place	1998
- * Club domestic league appearances and goals

Mansour Pourheidari (Persian: منصور پورحیدری, 26 January 1946 – 4 November 2016) was an Iranian football player, coach and manager.

He started his football career at Daraei, before joining Taj (currently known as Esteghlal) in 1965. He played ten years for Taj; between 1965 and 1975. Pourheidari returned to Daraei in 1975 to play his final career's two years at the club. He also played for Iran albeit earning three caps only. After retiring from playing football, Pourheidari started his coaching career, becoming assistant manager of Esteghlal. He was promoted to the first team manager in 1983. He was the head coach of the club for nine years overall, managing them in 309 games. He is also the only Iranian who has won AFC Champions League as both player and coach. He was the head coach of Iran national team in 1998 Asian Games where they won the first place and gold medal. He was technical manager and a member of the board of directors of Esteghlal at the time of his death in 2016.

== Playing career ==
Pourheidari began his football career at the age of 17 in Daraei but was transferred to Taj (now Esteghlal) in 1965 and played as a right defender for ten years and won the Asian Championship in 1970. He also played for the Iran national team and had three caps. He retired in 1977 from football.

== Managerial career ==
Pourheidari began his managerial career in 1980 as assistant coach to Abbas Razavi and Asghar Sharafi. He was promoted as the club's head coach in 1983 after the resignation of Sharafi. After three years, he was resigned and becomes head coach of UAE Pro-League side, Al-Ahli and led the team until 1989. He was re-appointed as Esteghlal manager in 1989 and won the league in the following season. He also led Esteghlal to their second Asian trophy in 1991. He was left the team in the next year but was returned again as head coach in 1995 and led the team for one season. After that, he becomes head coach of Fajr Sepasi for two seasons but was unable to earn any trophy. He became head coach of Iran national team in 1998 and led it until 2000. Pourheidari was also a member of the board of directors of Esteghlal for decades. He was team manager of Esteghlal from 2010 to 2012 and from 2012, he was technical manager of the club.

== Personal life ==
He was married to Farideh Shojaee, former Iran Football Federation vice president.

He died on 4 November 2016 of cancer.

== Coaching statistics ==
As of 31 March 2010

Team	From	To	Record							
Team	From	To	G	W	D	L	Win %	GF	GA	+/-
Iran	September 1998	February 2000	19	10	6	3	52.6%	37	20	+17
Total			19	10	6	3	52.6%	37	20	+17

== Honours ==
=== Player ===
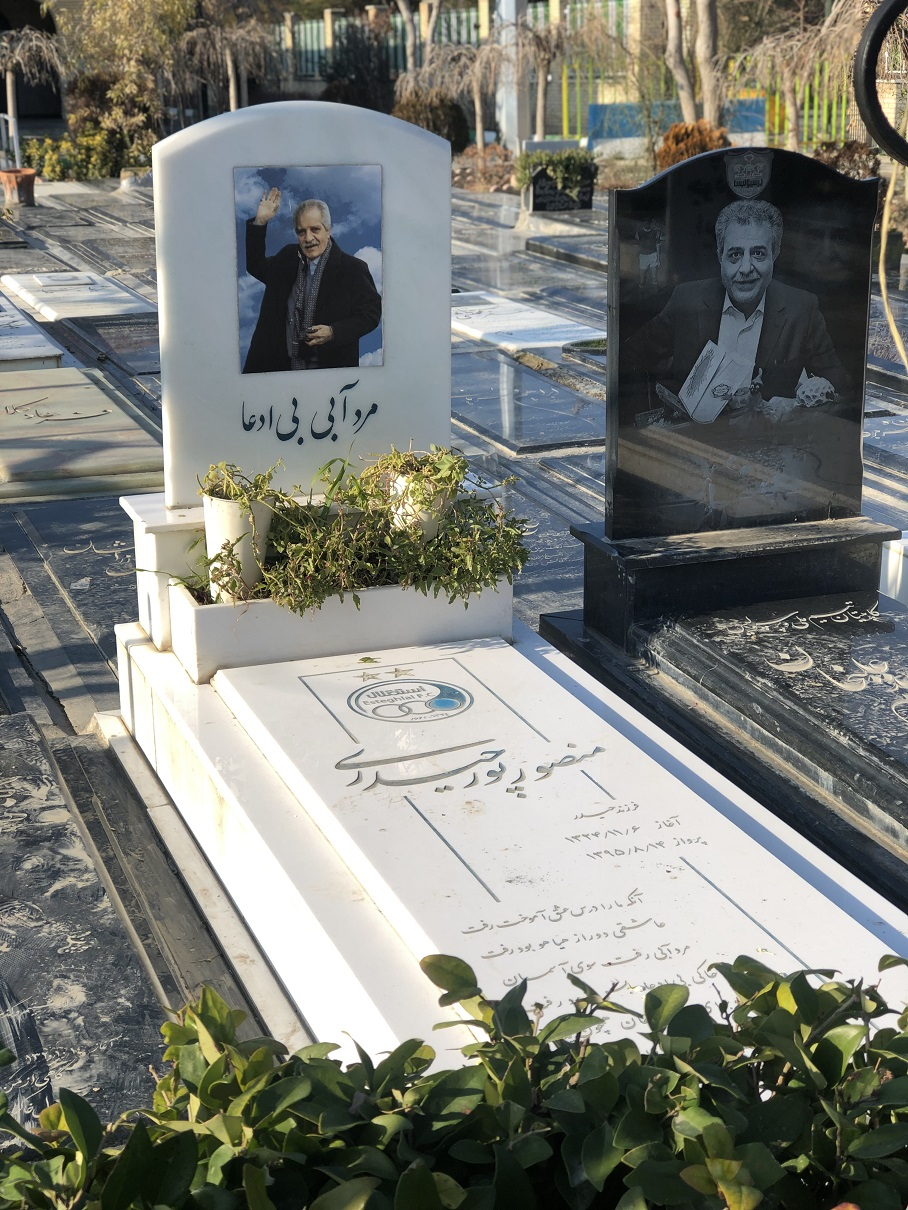
Pourheidari's grave at Beheshte Zahra

- Iranian Football League: 1970–71, 1974–75
- Asian Club Championship: 1970

=== Manager ===
Esteghlal

- Iranian Football League: 1989–90, 2000–01
- Hazfi Cup: 1996, 2000
- Asian Club Championship: 1991

Iran

- Asian Games: 1998

=== Individual ===
- January 1999 Asian Coach of the Month

Awards and achievements
Preceded by Hassan Habibi	Iran Pro League Winning Manager; 1989–90	Succeeded by Firouz Karimi
Preceded by Ali Parvin	Iran Pro League Winning Manager; 2000–01	Succeeded by Ali Parvin
