= Reza Vatankhah =

Iranian footballer and manager

Personal information
- Date of birth: February 9, 1947 (age 79)
- Place of birth: Tehran, Iran
- Position: Centre back

Senior career*
Years	Team	Apps	(Gls)
- Shahin Bushehr
1968–1980	Persepolis	148	(11)

International career
1970–1980	Iran	2	(0)

Managerial career
- Iran (Assistant)
- 1989: Iran
- 2000: Tractor Sazi
- 2006: Shahin Bushehr
- 2010: Petrochimi Tabriz
- 2015: Sardar Bukan
- * Club domestic league appearances and goals

Reza Vatankhah (Persian: رضا وطنخواه; born February 9, 1947, in Tehran, Iran) is an Iranian retired football player. He played for Persepolis F.C. as a left winger, and is now a manager. His elder brother Büyük was also a member and captain of Persepolis F.C.

Vatankhah managed the Iran national football team during 1989.
