= Firouz Karimi =

Iranian football manager (born 1958)

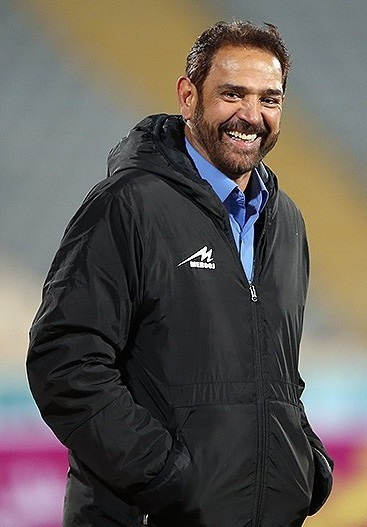
- Karimi managing Gostaresh Foulad in 2017

Personal information
- Full name: Firouz Karimi
- Date of birth: 13 April 1958 (age 68)
- Place of birth: Tehran, Iran
- Position: Defender

Senior career*
Years	Team	Apps	(Gls)
1970–1976	Shahrbani		
1976–1981	Pas Tehran		
1981–1984	Sarbaz		
1984–1988	Pas Tehran		

Managerial career
- 1989–1993: PAS Tehran
- 1993–1994: Sepahan
- 1994–1995: Bahman Karaj
- 1996–1997: PAS Tehran
- 1997–1998: Polyacryl Esfahan
- 1998–1999: Tractor
- 2000–2001: Aboomoslem
- 2001–2002: PAS Tehran
- 2003–2004: Aboomoslem
- 2004–2006: Rah Ahan
- 2006–2007: Esteghlal Ahvaz
- 2007–2008: Esteghlal
- 2008–2009: Saba Qom
- 2009–2010: Damash Gilan
- 2010–2011: Gostaresh Foolad
- 2011–2012: Shahin Bushehr
- 2012: Sang Ahan Bafq
- 2013: Paykan
- 2014: Zob Ahan
- 2014–2015: Malavan
- 2016: Oxin Alborz
- 2017: Sanat Naft
- 2017–2018: Gostaresh Foolad
- 2018: Machine Sazi
- 2019: Naft M.I.S
- 2019–2020: Atrak Bojnourd
- 2020–2021: Shams Azar (team manager)
- 2021: Tractor (technical assistant)
- 2021: Tractor
- 2021: Tractor
- 2022: Sanat Naft
- * Club domestic league appearances and goals

Firouz Karimi (Persian: فیروز کریمی, born 13 April 1958) is an Iranian football coach and former player. He played as a defender and has managed several clubs in Iran, including Pas Tehran, Esteghlal, Sepahan and Tractor. He has also worked as a football analyst and television pundit.

== Early life ==
Firouz Karimi was born on 13 April 1958 in Tehran, Iran.

== Playing career ==
He began playing football in Shahrbani F.C. in 1970 and joined Pas Tehran in 1976. He won the Takht Jamshid Cup twice with Pas. He left Pas in 1981 and joined Sarbaz but returned to Pas in 1984. He was also invited to the Iran national football team in 1980 but never played for the national team. He retired in 1984.

== Coaching career ==
He was selected as head coach of Pas Tehran in 1989. He could bring the team from 2nd Division to the Azadegan League in 1990. He won the 1991–92 and 1992–93 seasons and brought the Asian Club Championship for the team in 1993. He resigned after it and was appointed as Sepahan head coach later. He was sacked by the club in 1994 and became the head coach of Bahman going on to win the Hazfi Cup one year later. He was re-appointed as head coach of Pas in 1996 for one season. After these events, Polyacryl Esfahan signed a contract with Karimi but resigned after bad results. He was also head coach of Tabriz based Tractor Sazi from 1998 to 1999. He became head coach of Esteghlal Ahvaz in 1999 and led the team until 2000. He was manager of Aboomoslem for just six months in 2000 and was again selected to be Esteghlal Ahvaz's head coach in 2001. He resigned as head coach Esteghlal Ahvaz to become the head coach of PAS for a third spell. Shahab Zanjan and Aboomoslem was his next teams. He was appointed as Rah Ahan head coach in June 2004. He led the team in two seasons and was sacked in February 2006. He was again appointed as Esteghlal Ahvaz head coach in June 2006. After the resignation of Nasser Hejazi as head coach of Esteghlal, he became head coach of Esteghlal in November 2007 who, under his management, were ranked 13th. This was regarded as a bad result for the team in the history of Esteghlal. He resigned in May 2008 and was appointed as head coach of Saba Battery in July 2008. He was sacked by the club in June 2009. After it he signed a contract with Azadegan League side Damash Gilan in July 2009 but resigned after the team failed to get promoted to the Iran Pro League in the play-off. He became head coach of Shahin Bushehr on 6 October 2011 after Hamid Derakhshan's departure. He led the Shahin to the final of the 2011–12 Hazfi Cup but, after bad results in the league, he was fired by the club. On 27 January 2013, he became head coach of Paykan but his side was relegated to the Azadegan League at the end of the season.

In May 2013, Karimi was fired by Paykan and was replaced by Farhad Kazemi. Subsequently he was named as manager of Zob Ahan. He saved the club from relegation, however, he left the club at the end of the season after not agreeing on a new contract. On 6 December 2014, Karimi became head coach of Malavan.

=== Statistics ===
As of 5 November 2021

Team	From	To	Record				
Team	From	To	G	W	D	L	Win %
Pas Tehran	May 1989	May 1993	56	39	13	4	69.64
Sepahan	July 1993	July 1994	26	7	8	11	26.92
Pas Tehran	June 1996	July 1997	30	15	11	4	50.00
Tractor Sazi	June 1998	May 1999	30	7	13	10	23.33
Pas Tehran	July 2001	September 2001	6	5	0	1	83.33
Rah Ahan	June 2004	February 2006	30	10	7	13	33.33
Esteghlal Ahvaz	July 2006	November 2007	42	21	14	7	50.00
Esteghlal	November 2007	May 2008	20	6	5	9	30.00
Saba Battery	July 2008	June 2009	34	11	18	5	32.35
Damash Gilan	July 2009	May 2010	26	14	6	6	53.85
Shahin Bushehr	October 2011	February 2012	14	3	5	6	21.43
Paykan	January 2013	July 2013	12	1	2	9	8.33
Zob Ahan	February 2014	June 2014	4	3	0	1	75.00
Malavan	December 2014	July 2015	13	5	4	4	38.46
Oxin Alborz	July 2016	December 2016	16	8	2	6	50.00
Sanat Naft	January 2017	July 2017	15	4	5	6	26.67
Gostaresh Foulad	September 2017	July 2018	19	6	6	7	31.58
Machine Sazi	July 2018	August 2018	5	0	4	1	0.00
Tractor	July 2021	August 2021	6	4	0	2	66.67
Tractor	September 2021	November 2021	5	1	0	4	20.00
Total			409	170	123	116	41.56

== Honours ==
=== As player ===
Pas Tehran

- Takht Jamshid Cup (2): 1976–77, 1977–78

=== As manager ===
Pas Tehran

- Iran Pro League (2): 1991–92, 1992–93
- AFC Champions League Elite (1): 1993

Bahman

- Hazfi Cup (1): 1994–95

Awards and achievements
Preceded by Mansour Pourheidari	Iran Pro League Winning Manager; 1991–92, 1992–93	Succeeded by Bijan Zolfagharnasab
