= Paykan F.C. =

Iranian football club

Paykan پيکان
- Full name: Paykan Football Club
- Nickname: Khodro Sazan (Carmakers)
- Founded: 1967; 59 years ago
- Ground: Shahid Dastgerdi Stadium
- Capacity: 8,000
- Owner: Iran Khodro
- Chairman: Naghi Naeeji
- Head Coach: Saket Elhami
- League: Persian Gulf Pro League
- 2025–26: Persian Gulf Pro League, 12th of 16
- Website: ikcosport.com
Home colours	Away colours	Third colours

Paykan Football Club (Persian: باشگاه فوتبال فرهنگی ورزشی پيکان, Bâšgâh-e Futbâl-e Peykân) is a football team based in Tehran, Iran. The team is sponsored by Iran's main automobile manufacturer Iran Khodro and is named after one of its older products; the Paykan car. Paykan F.C. is the football club of the multisport Paykan Sport Club which also includes basketball and volleyball teams.

== History ==
=== Establishment ===
The club was established in 1967 by Mahmoud Khayami with financial help from the Iran Khodro factory. The main objective was to promote their factory's products, and improve their reputation. In 1969 the team became the Tehran City League's champions. The team was dissolved in 1970 after a series of difficulties between the players and management.

=== Rebirth of Paykan ===
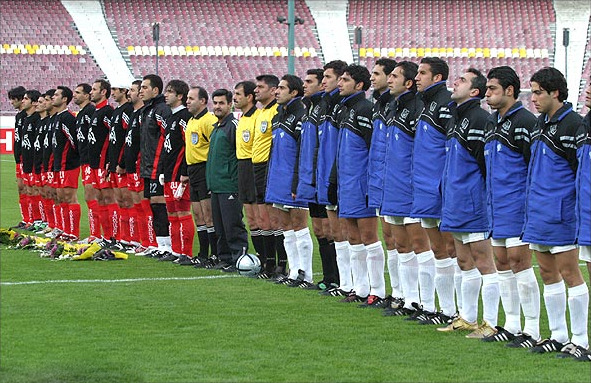
Paykan against Persepolis, 21 January 2005

Paykan still operated without a football team specifically in the 1980. Paykan did not have a football team until the year 2000, when they were able to buy Bahman's shares and participate in the top level of Iranian football after 30 years. The team participated in the 2000–01 Azadegan League with Bahman's squad but with a different coach.

The team had little success and were relegated from the Iran Pro League in the 2004–05 season. They were back in the IPL for the 06–07 season where they finished 7th.

==== Relocation to Qazvin ====
In 2008 Paykan was moved to Qazvin because the city of Tehran had many football teams with low attendance figures. They started the season well but toward the end their results got worse. The team changed their coach in the last weeks of the 2008–09 season and finished mid-table. Although they finished in the top half of the table in 2009–10 season the club chairman decided to replace Hamid Derakhshan with Mohammad Ahmadzadeh as the head coach. Paykan were relegated in 2010–2011, but the following year they earned their promotion back to the Iran Pro League for the 2012–2013 season.

==== Tehran and Qods ====
Paykan moved back to Tehran and started playing in the newly renovated Takhti Stadium. Paykan was relegated to Azadegan League again in April 2013. Before the start of the 2013–14 season Paykan once again relocate and this time to the city of Qods. In the 2013–2014 season Paykan finished 2nd in the Azadegan League, thus giving them a shot at Iran Pro League promotion. Paykan defeated Siah Jamegan 3–1 on aggregate and advanced to play Iran Pro League club Fajr Sepasi in a promotion play-off. The first game in Shiraz ended 0–0 with neither team getting the upper hand. But, in the return leg in Qods, Paykan achieved promotion with a lone goal in the 65th minute. Paykan announced they will be playing in that city for the 2014–15 Persian Gulf Pro League season. At the end of the 2014–15 season, Paykan finished 15th and was relegated.

In the 2015–16 Azadegan League season, Paykan finished first and were directly promoted to the Persian Gulf Pro League.

== Seasons ==
Year	Division	Pos.	Hazfi Cup	Notes
2001–02	Pro League	7th	Semifinal	
2002–03	Pro League	5th	Quarterfinal	
2003–04	Pro League	7th		
2004–05	Pro League	15th	Quarterfinal	Relegated
2005–06	Azadegan League	2nd		Promoted
2006–07	Pro League	7th	Quarterfinal	
2007–08	Pro League	7th	1/8 Final	
2008–09	Pro League	8th	1/16 Final	
2009–10	Pro League	11th	1/16 Final	
2010–11	Pro League	17th	Round of 32	Relegated
2011–12	Azadegan League	1st	Third Round	Promoted
2012–13	Pro League	17th	Round of 32	Relegated
2013–14	Azadegan League	2nd	Third Round	Promoted
2014–15	Pro League	15th	Round of 16	Relegated
2015–16	Azadegan League	1st	Third Round	Promoted
2016–17	Pro League	6th	Round of 32	
2017–18	Pro League	6th	Round of 32	
2018–19	Pro League	11th	Round of 32	
2019–20	Pro League	13th	Round of 16	
2020–21	Pro League	7th	Round of 32	
2021–22	Pro League	9th	Round of 16	
2022–23	Pro League	11th	Quarterfinal	
2023–24	Pro League	15th	Round of 16	Relegated
2024–25	Azadegan League	2nd	Quarterfinal	Promoted

== Individual Records ==
=== All Top Appearances ===
Rank	Name	Nationality	Apps
1	Mohammad Reza Tahmasebi	Iran	240
2	Mohammad Hossein Memar	Iran	170
3	Amir Mirbozorgi	Iran	163
4	Arman Ghasemi	Iran	160
5	Mohammad Sadegh Barani	Iran	132
6	Mehdi Tajik	Iran	126
7	Ebrahim Salehi	Iran	122
8	Meysam Rezapour	Iran	118
9	Faraz Emamali	Iran	95
10	Hojjat Haghverdi	Iran	94

=== All Top Scorers ===
Rank	Name	Nationality	Goals
1	Mohammad Reza Tahmasebi	Iran	32
2	Morteza Aghakhan	Iran	23
2	Iman Heydari	Iran	23
4	Morteza Aziz-Mohammadi	Iran	17
5	Shahriyar Moghanlou	Iran	16
5	Ali Asghar Modir Roosta	Iran	16
7	Godwin Mensha	Nigeria	15
7	Faraz Emamali	Iran	15
7	Amir Mirbozorgi	Iran	15
10	Jahangir Asgari	Iran	14

== Sponsorship ==
=== Official sponsors ===
For the 2007/08 season it has been announced that Paykan's official kit sponsor will be ISACO.

=== Kit providers ===
- 2008/09: Majid
- 2009/10: Daei
- 2011/12: Umbro

== Club chairmen ==
- Nader Shahsavari (1970–05)
- Hossein Kafami (2005–06)
- Ibrahim Sanaei (2006–07)
- Mostafa Karkhaneh (2007–08)
- Mohammad-Reza Davarzani (2008)
- Kamran Sahebpanah (2008–10)
- Mahmoud Shiyi (2010–2021)
- Hamidreza Garshasbi (2021- 2022)

== Club managers ==
=== Managerial history ===
- (England) Alan Rogers (1969–70)
- (Wales) Stuart Williams (1970)
- (Germany) Klaus Schlappner (2000–01)
- (Iran) Hamid Alidoosti (2001–02)
- (Iran) Bijan Zolfagharnasab (2002–03)
- (Iran) Homayoun Shahrokhi (2003–04)
- (Iran) Mohammad Mayeli Kohan (2004–05)
- (Iran) Farhad Kazemi (2005–06)
- (Armenia) Samvel Darbinyan (2006–08)
- (Iran) Ali Asghar Modir Roosta (2008–09)
- (Iran) Hamid Derakhshan (2009–10)
- (Iran) Mohammad Ahmadzadeh (2010)
- (Iran) Hamid Alidousti (2010–11)
- (Iran) Mohammad Hossein Ziaei (2011)
- (Iran) Farhad Kazemi (2011–12)
- (Iran) Abdollah Veisi (2012–13)
- (Iran) Firouz Karimi (2013)
- (Iran) Farhad Kazemi (2013–14)
- (Iran) Mansour Ebrahimzadeh (2014)
- (Iran) Samad Marfavi (2014–15)
- (Iran) Alireza Marzban (2015–16)
- (Iran) Majid Jalali (2016–18)
- (Iran) Hossein Faraki (2018–20)
- (Iran) Mehdi Tartar (2020–21)
- (Iran) Mojtaba Hosseini (2021–2023)

== Players ==
=== First-team squad ===
As of 1 September 2026

Note: Flags indicate national team as defined under FIFA eligibility rules; some limited exceptions apply. Players may hold more than one non-FIFA nationality.

No.	Pos.	Nation	Player
1	GK	IRN	Hossein Pourhamidi
2	DF	IRN	Amir Hossein Gholami (Captain)
5	DF	IRN	Milad Bagheri
6	DF	IRN	Saeb Mohebi
7	FW	IRN	Hojjat Ahmadi ^{U23}
8	MF	IRN	Mehdi Najafi ^{U25}
9	MF	IRN	Saman Nariman Jahan
10	MF	IRN	Reza Shekari
11	MF	IRN	Farid Amiri
13	GK	IRN	Armin Abbasi ^{U21}
14	MF	IRN	Farshid Bagheri
15	MF	IRN	Milad Sayyar ^{U23}
16	MF	IRN	Amir Reza Alimoradi ^{U23}
18	DF	IRN	Amir Ali Madadizadeh ^{U21}
23	MF	IRN	Mohsen Hassanpour ^{U19}

No.	Pos.	Nation	Player
29	MF	IRN	Mehdi Mashayekh ^{U21}
33	GK	IRN	Mehdi Younespour ^{U19}
44	DF	IRN	Nima Ahmadi ^{U21}
47	MF	IRN	Arian Radinkia ^{U19}
55	MF	IRN	Aydin Fathi ^{U21}
60	DF	IRN	Amirmohammad Mousavi ^{U21}
61	MF	IRN	Jafar Asadi ^{U19}
66	MF	IRN	Ali Dehghan
70	MF	IRN	Iliya Karami ^{U19}
72	MF	IRN	Hassan Shushtari
77	FW	IRN	Erfan Jamshidi ^{U23}
88	MF	IRN	Ehsan Hadian ^{U23}
90	MF	IRN	Sajjad Ashouri
97	DF	IRN	Behzad Salami ^{U25}
98	FW	IRN	Mohammad Pourmohammadi ^{U21}

=== Former players ===
For notable former players, see Category:Paykan F.C. players.

== Honours ==
=== National ===
- Iran Championship Cup
  - Winners (1): 1968
- Azadegan League (as 2nd tier)
  - Winners (2): 2011–12, 2015–16
  - Runners–up (2): 2005–06, 2024–25

=== Provincial ===
- Tehran Province League
  - Winners (1): 1969–70
