= Branko Ivanković =

Croatian footballer and manager

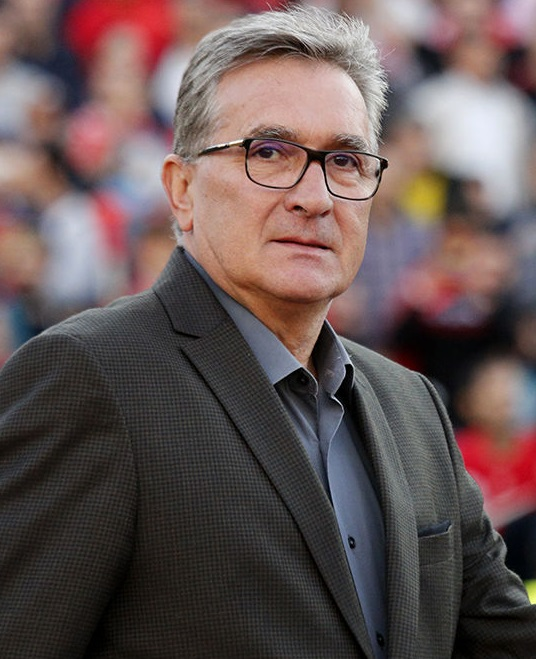
- Ivanković in 2019

Personal information
- Date of birth: 28 February 1954 (age 72)
- Place of birth: Varaždin, PR Croatia, Yugoslavia
- Height: 1.81 m (5 ft 11 in)
- Position: Attacking midfielder

Senior career*
Years	Team	Apps	(Gls)
1979–1990	Varteks	269	(83)

Managerial career
- 1991–1995: Varteks
- 1995–1996: Segesta
- 1996–1998: Rijeka
- 1998–1999: Croatia (assistant)
- 1999–2000: Hannover 96
- 2001–2002: Iran (assistant)
- 2002–2003: Iran U-23
- 2002–2006: Iran
- 2006–2008: Dinamo Zagreb
- 2009–2011: Shandong Luneng
- 2011–2012: Al-Ettifaq
- 2012–2013: Al-Wahda
- 2013: Dinamo Zagreb
- 2015–2019: Persepolis
- 2019: Al-Ahli
- 2020–2024: Oman
- 2024–2025: China
Medal record
Men's football
Representing Iran (as manager)
AFC Asian Cup
Bronze medal – third place	2004
- * Club domestic league appearances and goals

Branko Ivanković (Croatian pronunciation: [brâːŋko ǐʋaːŋkoʋitɕ]; born 28 February 1954) is a Croatian former football manager and player who played as a midfielder. After a 12-year playing career at Varteks, Ivanković started his coaching career at the same club in 1991. Prior to his appointment as the manager of Oman, Ivanković's most high-profile managerial positions were at the most successful Croatian and Iranian clubs respectively, Dinamo Zagreb and Persepolis as well as one of the most successful Chinese clubs Shandong Luneng. He additionally served as both assistant coach and manager of the Iran national team, leading the team at the 2006 FIFA World Cup in Germany.

== Playing career ==
Ivanković spent his entire 12-season playing career at Varteks, appearing in a total of 263 matches and scoring 31 goals. He then continued to work at the club by first being their secretary and then starting his coaching career.

== Managerial career ==
=== Croatia national team ===
Ivanković then became an assistant manager to Miroslav Blažević, who led the Croatia national team to a sensational third-place finish at the 1998 World Cup finals in France.

In the 1999–2000 season, he coached German club Hannover 96, which was playing in the 2. Bundesliga at the time. He briefly returned to the Croatia national team as the assistant to Mirko Jozić during the qualifications for the 2002 World Cup, before he took over the Iran national team, where he replaced Blažević, who had managed them since 2001.

=== Iran ===
Ivanković was appointed to the head of the Iranian team on 29 January 2002. Under Ivanković, Iran's U23 football team won the 2002 Asian Games in Pusan. He remained the coach of the national team until the end of 2002, when he was replaced by Homayun Shahrokhi.

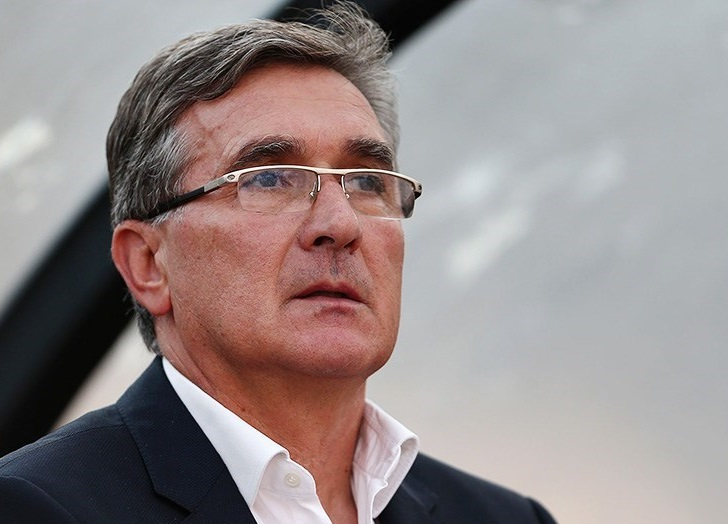
Branko Ivanković during a Persepolis match

Ivanković had become very popular in Iran and the public media demanded a contract renewal, but the Football Federation was initially reluctant to appoint him as the head coach. Finally after a period of negotiations he was reappointed as the head coach of Iran on 3 October 2003.

Ivanković led Iran to 2004 AFC Asian Cup third place.

Ivanković also led Iran to qualify for the 2006 World Cup, the third time in the country's history (they had previously been eliminated in the first round in 1978 and 1998).

==== 2006 World Cup ====
Iran, at their opening game at the World Cup, matched evenly against Mexico in the first half, but conceded two goals in the second. The second match against Portugal was not successful either, with Iran conceding two late goals to lose 2–0 and being left without any chances of advancing to the second stage of the tournament, as Mexico drew against Angola on the previous evening and left Iran unreachable four points behind. So, the third group match against Angola became insignificant for Iran. Angola put themselves into the lead with the opening goal after one hour of playing. The Iranians managed to equalise fifteen minutes later, eventually scoring their only point at the 2006 World Cup since the match ended in a 1–1 draw. This point was, however, only enough for Iran to occupy the last place in their group.

After the World Cup, MPE removed the Head of the Football Federation of Iran, replacing Ivanković with Amir Qalenoei. This in turn resulted a FIFA suspension for Iran's football due to political interference.

=== Dinamo Zagreb ===
On 6 November 2006, Ivanković replaced Josip Kuže as the head coach of Croatian club Dinamo Zagreb. He led the club to the Double in 2007 without losing a single competitive match. On 14 January 2008, he resigned as the coach of Dinamo Zagreb, mostly due to his differences with the club's executive vice-president Zdravko Mamić.

Ivanković returned as the manager of Dinamo Zagreb on 21 May 2008. He replaced Zvonimir Soldo, who resigned immediately after Dinamo won the domestic double.

In July 2009, Ivanković was offered the role of Persepolis manager in Iran, but he rejected the offer.

=== Shandong Luneng ===
On 17 December 2009, Ivanković was appointed as the new head coach of Chinese giant Shandong Luneng. In his first season, he led the team to the 2010 Chinese Super League winners with a record 63 points. The team secured the qualification for 2011 AFC Champions League, but Shandong were eliminated in the first round with 7 points. Due to poor result in the Champions League, he was dismissed on 10 May 2011, seven days before crucial game with Cerezo Osaka, which they lost by a score of 0–4.

=== Ettifaq ===
On 22 July 2011, Ivanković signed a one-year contract with Ettifaq to lead the club in the 2011–12 Saudi Professional League and return club to the AFC Champions League. He was sacked on 29 April 2012 after finishing the 2011–12 season in fourth.

=== Al Wahda ===
In May 2012, UAE Pro-League side Al-Wahda said it signed a two-year contract with Ivanković and that he would take charge at the club in the 2012–13 season, but his contract was terminated on 27 April 2013, after a 3–4 loss to Ajman Club. At the time of his dismissal, Al Wahda was ranked at the 7th place.

=== Return to Dinamo Zagreb ===
On 2 September 2013, Ivanković returned to Dinamo Zagreb, the club he led from 2006 to 2008. However, he was sacked on 21 October 2013, after just five games.

=== Persepolis ===
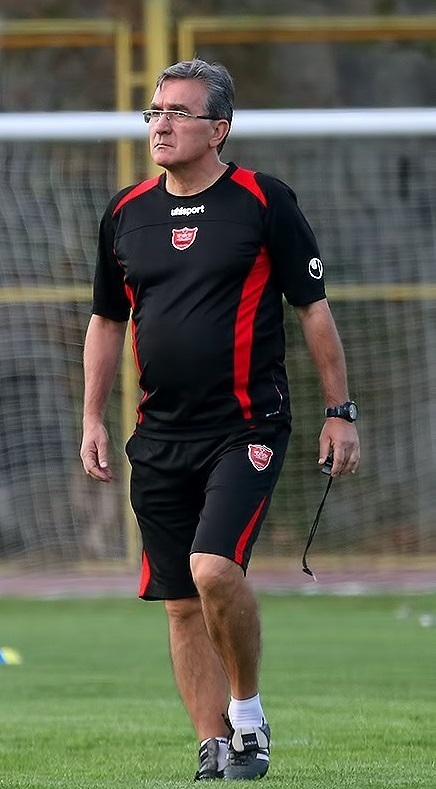
Ivanković in training with Persepolis at Derafshifar Stadium, 3 October 2015

On 5 April 2015, Ivanković was confirmed as the new manager of Persepolis, signing a 1 1/2-year contract with the club. After good performances with the club, which left the team in the first place with six matches remaining, Ivanković extended his contract with Persepolis in April 2016 to the end of the 2017–18 season and in 2017 to the end of the 2019–20 season. After the end of the 2018–19 season, it was reported that he was signed for Ahli Jeddah before returning to Croatia for his annual vacation. Ivanković announced that he will leave Persepolis on 11 June 2019.

=== Al-Ahli ===
On 18 June 2019, he was confirmed signing a two-year contract with Al-Ahli. On 16 September 2019, Ivanković was officially sacked after just five games due to poor results.

=== Oman ===
On 19 January 2020, Ivanković was announced as the head coach of the Oman national team to succeed Erwin Koeman after the latter's dismissal. Under Ivanković, Oman pulled off a historic win over Japan in the final round of the 2022 FIFA World Cup qualifiers. In December 2021, he extended his contract with Oman until 2023.

Following Oman's group stage exit from the 2023 AFC Asian Cup without a single win, Ivanković was sacked by the Oman Football Association.

=== China ===
On 24 February 2024, Ivanković was announced as the head coach of China national football team, replacing former Yugoslav compatriot Aleksandar Janković. This disappointed some fans who were expecting Joachim Löw as the new head coach. Under his tenure, China only managed to reach the third round of the World Cup qualification by the slimmest margin, thanks to China's superior head-to-head record against Thailand after both teams were equal on points, goals scored and goal difference.

Following China’s elimination in the third round of World Cup qualification, Ivanković was sacked by the Chinese Football Association.

=== Retirement ===
On 30 October 2025, Ivanković announced his retirement from management in a social media post.

== Personal life ==
Branko is the younger brother of Zlatko Ivanković, who has also coached various teams in the Middle East.

== Managerial statistics ==
As of match played 10 June 2025

Team	From	To	Record				
Team	From	To	G	W	D	L	Win %
Varteks	July 1991	June 1995	116	44	34	38	37.93
Rijeka	August 1996	March 1998	30	13	7	10	43.33
Hannover 96	July 1999	February 2000	34	12	8	14	35.29
Iran	February 2002	September 2002	10	4	4	2	40.00
Iran U-23	September 2002	October 2002	6	4	2	0	66.67
Iran	October 2003	July 2006	42	28	7	7	66.67
Dinamo Zagreb	November 2006	January 2008	110	78	14	18	70.91
Shandong Luneng	April 2010	July 2011	36	21	10	5	58.33
Ettifaq	July 2011	April 2012	42	18	12	12	42.86
Al-Wahda	July 2012	April 2013	34	18	3	13	52.94
Dinamo Zagreb	September 2013	October 2013	5	2	1	2	40.00
Persepolis	April 2015	June 2019	175	98	49	28	56.00
Al-Ahli	June 2019	September 2019	5	2	1	2	40.00
Oman	January 2020	January 2024	46	22	10	14	47.83
China	February 2024	June 2025	14	4	2	8	28.57
Total			701	368	157	172	52.50

== Honours ==
=== Manager ===
Iran U23

- Asian Games Gold Medal: 2002

Iran

- WAFF Championship: 2004
- AFC/OFC Cup Challenge: 2003

Dinamo Zagreb

- Croatian First League: 2006–07, 2007–08
- Croatian Cup: 2006–07
- Croatian Super Cup: 2006

Shandong Luneng

- Chinese Super League: 2010

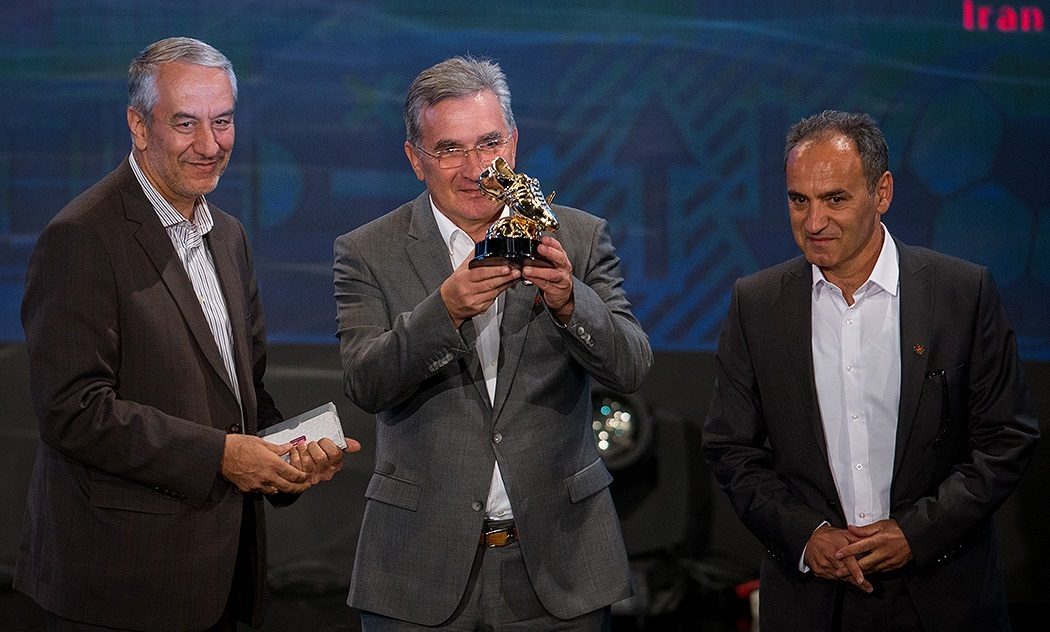
Ivanković receiving IFF best manager award

Persepolis

- Persian Gulf Pro League: 2016–17, 2017–18, 2018–19, runner-up: 2015–16
- Hazfi Cup: 2018–19
- Iranian Super Cup: 2017, 2018, 2019
- AFC Champions League runner-up: 2018

Individual

- HNS Croatian Coach of the Year: 2007, 2008
- Chinese Football Association Coach of the Year: 2010
- Persian Gulf Pro League Coach of the Season: 2016–17, 2017–18, 2018–19

Awards and achievements
Preceded by Abdollah Veisi	Iran Pro League Winning Manager; 2016–17, 2017–18, 2018–19	Succeeded by Yahya Golmohammadi
