= Mladen Frančić =

Croatian footballer and manager (1955–2022)

Personal information
- Date of birth: 11 November 1955
- Place of birth: Bjelovar, Yugoslavia
- Date of death: 7 June 2022 (aged 66)
- Place of death: Koprivnica, Croatia

Senior career*
Years	Team	Apps	(Gls)
- Čelik Križevac
- Slaven Belupo
–1981	Lokomotiva Koprivnica		

Managerial career
- 1984: Slaven Belupo (assistant)
- 1984–1986: Lipa Hlebine
- 1987–1988: Osvit Đelekovec
- 1989: Mladost Nada Hrastovec
- 1990–1992: Graničar Đurđevac
- 1992–1993: Vrbovec
- 1994–1998: Podravina
- 1999: Podravac
- 2000–2001: Slaven Belupo
- 2001–2003: Croatia U20
- 2002: Čakovec
- 2003–2004: Croatia U21
- 2004–2006: Foolad
- 2006–2010: Croatia U20
- 2011–2012: Hetten FC
- 2013: Al-Qadisiyah FC
- 2013–2014: Slaven Belupo
- 2014–2015: Al-Watani Club
- 2016–2017: Al-Nahda Club
- 2017: Damac FC
- 2018–2020: Al-Watani Club
- * Club domestic league appearances and goals

Mladen Frančić (11 November 1955 – 7 June 2022) was a Croatian football manager and former player.

== Playing career ==
Frančić played for Čelik Križevac, Slaven Belupo and Lokomotiva Koprivnica, before retiring in 1981.

== Managerial career ==
As a manager, he won the Iranian league in 2004-05 with Foolad.

== Death ==
Frančić died of a heart attack on 7 June 2022.

== Managerial record ==
Nat	Team	From	To	Record						
Nat	Team	From	To	G	W	D	L	GF	GA	+/-
(Croatia)	Slaven Belupo	May 2000	June 2001	32	11	11	10	39	37	+2
(Croatia)	Croatia U19	June 2001	January 2003	11	5	2	4	16	13	+3
(Croatia)	Croatia U21	January 2003	June 2004	8	4	2	2	11	5	+6
(Iran)	Foolad	June 2004	June 2006	67	31	16	20	79	73	+6
(Croatia)	Croatia U21	July 2006	December 2010	28	14	4	10	45	43	+2
(Saudi Arabia)	Hetten	September 2011	December 2012	42	30	11	1	35	11	+14
(Saudi Arabia)	Al-Qadisiyah	July 2013	September 2013							
(Croatia)	Slaven Belupo	September 2013	February 2014							
(Saudi Arabia)	Al Watani	October 2014	March 2015							
(Saudi Arabia)	Al-Nahda Club (Saudi Arabia)	2016	2017							

== Honours ==
Foolad

- Iran Pro League: 2004–05
