= 1992–93 Azadegan League =

2nd season of Azadegan League

Azadegan League
- Season: 1992–93
- Champions: PAS
- Relegated: Koma Shiraz; Aboumoslem; Sepirood; Vahdat Sari; Polyacryl; Esteghlal
- Asian Club Championship: PAS
- Asian Winners' Cup: Persepolis
- Top goalscorer: Jamshid Shahmohammadi (11 goals)

The 1992–93 Azadegan League was the second season of the Azadegan League, Iran's top-level league of professional football at the time. The 1992–93 league was won by the defending champions PAS Tehran. The final results of the 1992–93 Azadegan League, Iran's top division league, are listed below.

== Group stage ==
Group A
Pos	Team	Pld	W	D	L	GF	GA	GD	Pts	Qualification or relegation
1	Tractor Sazi	14	8	5	1	23	11	+12	21	Promoted to Semi-finals
2	Keshavarz	14	7	4	3	18	9	+9	18	Promoted to Semi-finals
3	Esteghlal (R)	14	4	8	2	10	8	+2	16	Relegated to 3rd Division (Note: On that time, Tehran did not have any teams in Iran Football's 2nd Division League. Therefore, the teams from Tehran, who did not qualify for the next season of the Azadegan League, should have chosen between either Tehran Football League or a national competition called Iran Football's 3rd Division League for coming back to Azadegan League. Esteghlal decided to play the Iran 3rd Division competition.)
4	Sanat Naft	14	5	5	4	10	11	−1	15	
5	Jonoob Ahvaz	14	5	3	6	13	13	0	15 (Note: 2 bonus points?)	
6	Koma Shiraz (R)	14	2	6	6	14	8	+6	10	Relegated to 2nd Division
7	Vahdat Sari (R)	14	3	2	9	16	22	−6	9 (Note: 1 bonus points?)	Relegated to 2nd Division
8	Sepidrood Rasht (R)	14	2	3	9	9	21	−12	7	Relegated to 2nd Division

(R) Relegated
Notes:

Group B
Pos	Team	Pld	W	D	L	GF	GA	GD	Pts	Qualification or relegation
1	Persepolis	14	6	6	2	23	11	+12	18	Promoted to Semi-finals
2	PAS Tehran	14	5	7	2	20	14	+6	17	Promoted to Semi-finals
3	Polyacryl (R)	14	6	3	5	14	20	−6	15	Relegated to 2nd Division
4	Malavan	14	4	6	4	18	15	+3	14	
5	Esteghlal Ahvaz	14	4	6	4	17	17	0	14	
6	Bargh Shiraz	14	4	6	4	9	16	−7	14	
7	Nassaji Mazandaran	14	3	5	6	15	17	−2	11	
8	Aboumoslem (R)	14	1	7	6	10	21	−11	7 (Note: 2 points deducted?)	Relegated to 2nd Division

(R) Relegated

== Knockout stage ==
=== Semi-finals ===
Team 1	Agg.	Team 2	1st leg	2nd leg
Persepolis	2–0	Keshavarz	N/A	N/A
PAS Tehran	2–1	Tractor Sazi	1–0	1–1

=== Final ===
Team 1	Score	Team 2
PAS Tehran	1–1 (5–3 p)	Persepolis

=== Final standings ===
Pos	Team	Qualification
1	PAS Tehran	Qualification for the 1993–94 Asian Club Championship
2	Persepolis	Qualification for the 1993–94 Asian Cup Winners Cup
3	Keshavarz	
3	Tractor Sazi	

== Notes ==
- Azadegan League champions: Pas Tehran
- Relegated teams to 2nd Division: Koma Shiraz, Aboumoslem, Sepirood Rasht, Vahdat Sari, Polyacryl
- Relegated teams to 3rd Division: Esteghlal Tehran
- Promoted teams: Saipa F.C., Zob Ahan, Chooka Talesh, Sepahan
- Top Goalscorer: Jamshid Shahmohammadi (Keshavarz) 11 Goals
