= Bijan Zolfagharnasab =

Iranian footballer and manager

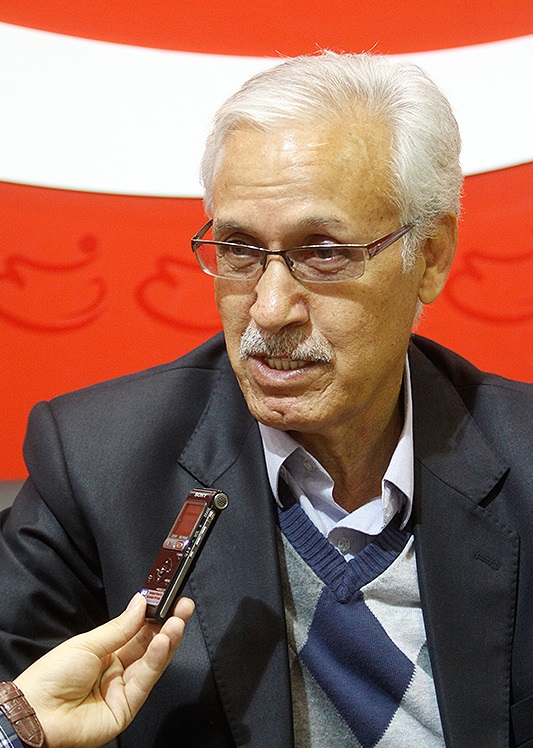

Personal information
- Full name: Bijan Zolfagharnasab
- Date of birth: June 7, 1949 (age 77)
- Place of birth: Sanandaj, Iran
- Position: Defender

Senior career*
Years	Team	Apps	(Gls)
1970–1974	Pas		
1974–1979	Persepolis		

International career
1973–1977	Iran	13	(0)

Managerial career
- 1988–1991: Gostaresh
- 1991–1992: Iran Olympic (Assistant)
- 1992–1993: Esteghlal
- 1993–1997: Saipa
- 1997–1998: Shahrdari Tabriz
- 1997–1998: Iran (Assistant)
- 1998–1999: Pas
- 2000–2002: Mes Kerman
- 2002–2004: Paykan
- 2004–2006: Saipa
- 2006–2007: Bargh Shiraz
- 2007–2008: Zob Ahan
- 2008: Damash Gilan
- 2009: Sanat Naft
- * Club domestic league appearances and goals

Bijan Zolfagharnasab (Persian: بیژن ذوالفقارنسب, born June 7, 1949, in Sanandaj) is a retired Iranian football player and currently a football manager.

He started his professional career with Pas Tehran, before changing to Persepolis F.C. in 1974. There he could win the Iranian championship in 1976 and reach runner-up position in 1975, in 1977 and in 1978. After the Iranian Revolution he remained playing for Persepolis winning the Iranian nationwide tournament Espandi Cup in 1979 before retiring from football and starting his studies in Physical Education in Brussels.

He was a starter at the 1976 Asian Cup in Tehran, which Iran won. He also participated in the football tournament at the 1976 Olympics, where Iran progressed to the quarter-finals. As of June 2011, he is a member of Technical Committee of Persepolis.

He received his Ph.D. from the University of Brussels in the field of Physical Education in the early 80's.

== Coaching career statistics ==
As of 31 March 2010

Team	From	To	Record							
Team	From	To	G	W	D	L	Win %	GF	GA	+/-
Iran (B)	9 April 2005	20 April 2005	6	3	3	0	50%	16	1	+15
Total			6	3	3	0	50%	16	1	+15

Awards and achievements
Preceded by Firouz Karimi	Iran Pro League Winning Manager; 1993–94, 1994–95	Succeeded by Stanko Poklepović
