= List of Esteghlal F.C. managers =

Esteghlal F.C. is an Iranian professional association football club base in Tehran. The club was formed in Ferdowsi Street, central Tehran in 26 September 1945 as Docharkhesavaran and was renamed to Taj F.C. in 11 February 1950. In spring of 1979 and only a few weeks after the Iranian revolution the club was renamed to its current name, Esteghlal F.C.

Ali Danaeifard is the first manager in the club's history. Danaifard managed Taj in 3 separate spells. As of 2024–25 season there have been 43 managers in 70 separate spells managing the club.

== Notable managers ==
Only managers who have won official trophies are listed.

Key

Name	Official Trophies
Domestic
IPL	Iranian league
HC	Hazfi Cup
ISC	Iranian Super Cup
ICC	Iran championship cup
TPL	Tehran Province League
THC	Tehran Hazfi Cup
TSC	Tehran Super Cup
International
ACL	AFC Champions League

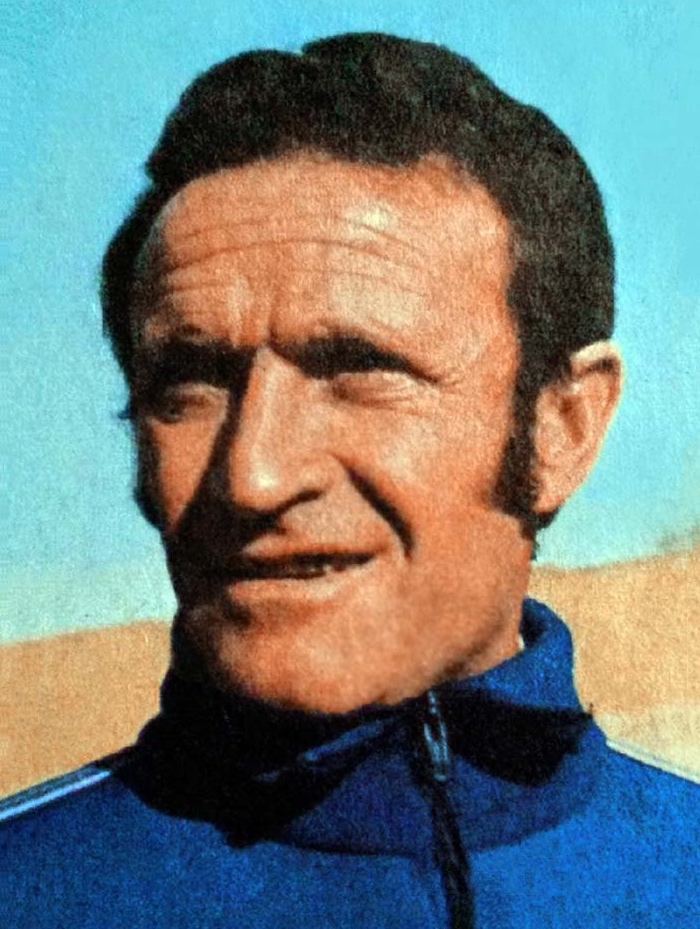
Zdravko Rajkov was Esteghlal's first international coach.

Name	Nat.	Period	Official Trophies								
Name	Nat.	Period	Total	Domestic							International
Name	Nat.	Period	Total	IPL	HC	ISC	ICC	TPL	THC	TSC	ACL
Ali Danaeifard	(Iran)	1946–1953; 1954–1967; 1968–1970; 1976	13	0	0	0	1	8	4	0	0
Mansour Pourheidari	(Iran)	1979; 1981; 1983–1984; 1985–1986; 1986–1988; 1989–1992; 1995–1996; 2000–2002; 2003	8	2	2	0	0	3	0	0	1
Zdravko Rajkov	(Socialist Federal Republic of Yugoslavia)	1969–1971; 1971–1976	5	2	0	0	0	2	0	0	1
Amir Ghalenoei	(Iran)	2003–2006; 2008–2009; 2012–2015	5	3	2	0	0	0	0	0	0
Vladimir Đekić	(Germany) (Socialist Federal Republic of Yugoslavia)	1976–1979	1	0	1	0	0	0	0	0	0
Reza Naalchegar	(Iran)	1994; 1994	1	0	0	0	0	0	0	1	0
Nasser Hejazi	(Iran)	1996–1999	1	1	0	0	0	0	0	0	0
Parviz Mazloumi	(Iran)	2010–2012; 2015–2016	1	0	1	0	0	0	0	0	0
Winfried Schäfer	(Germany)	2017–2019	1	0	1	0	0	0	0	0	0
Farhad Majidi	(Iran)	2019–2020; 2021–2022	1	1	0	0	0	0	0	0	0
Ricardo Sá Pinto	(Portugal)	2022–2023; 2025–2026	1	0	0	1	0	0	0	0	0
Mojtaba Jabbari	(Iran)	2025	1	0	1	0	0	0	0	0	0

== Managers ==
- Statistics are complete up to and including the match played on 7 November 2026.

Key

- M = matches played; W = matches won; D = matches drawn; L = matches lost; GF = Goals for; GA = Goals against; Win % = percentage of total matches won
- Managers with this background in the "Name" column are italicised to denote caretaker appointments.

List of Esteghlal F.C. managers
Name	Nationality	From	To	M	W	D	L	GF	GA	Win %	Honours	Notes
Ali Danaeifard	Iran	March 1946	August 1953	49	34	5	10	111	36	69%	Tehran Hazfi Cup: 1947–48, 1951–52; Tehran League: 1949–50, 1952–53	
Rasool Madadnoui	Iran	August 1953	1954	10	6	1	3	28	10	60%	–	
Ali Danaeifard	Iran	1954	1967	114	72	21	14	312	94	?	Tehran League: 1956–1957, 1957–1958; 1959–1960, 1960–1961, 1962–1963; Iran championship cup: 1957–1958; Tehran Hazfi Cup: 1959–1960, 1960–1961	
Mahmoud Bayati	Iran	19 May 1967	January 1968	20	12	5	3	46	10	60%	–	
Ali Danaeifard	Iran	January 1968	March 1970	23	14	7	2	43	8	61%	Tehran League: 1968–1969	
Zdravko Rajkov	Yugoslavia	March 1970	June 1971	38	28	7	3	85	27	74%	Asian Club Championship: 1970; Tehran League: 1970–1971; Iran Local League: 1970–1971	
Parviz Koozehkanani	Iran	June 1971	July 1971	4	4	0	0	11	1	100%	–	
Zdravko Rajkov	Yugoslavia	July 1971	19 November 1976	137	79	37	21	207	89	58%	Tehran League: 1972–1973; Takht Jamshid Cup: 1974	
Ali Danaeifard	Iran	December 1976	December 1976	4	1	2	1	3	3	25%	–	
Vladimir Đekić	Yugoslavia; Germany	December 1976	October 1978	47	25	11	11	51	31	53%	Iran Hazfi Cup: 1977–1978	
Mansour Pourheidari	Iran	1979	1979	–	–	–	–	–	–	–	–	
Abbas Razavi	Iran	1980	1980	9	6	2	1	27	3	66%	–	
Mansour Pourheidari	Iran	1981	1981	3	1	0	2	3	1	33%	–	
Hassan Azodi	Iran	1981	1981	2	1	1	0	1	0	50%	–	
Abbas Razavi	Iran	1981	1982	12	5	5	2	16	9	41%	–	
Asghar Sharafi	Iran	1982	1982	6	5	1	10	16	2	83%	–	
Hassan Azodi	Iran	1982	1982	6	4	1	1	6	1	66%	–	
Nasser Hejazi	Iran	1983	1983	8	4	4	0	14	6	50%	–	
Mansour Pourheidari	Iran	1983	1984	22	16	4	2	37	9	73%	Tehran League: 1983–1984	
Abbas Kordnouri	Iran	1984	1984	3	3	0	0	10	1	100%	–	
Fereydoun Askarzadeh	Iran	1984	1984	–	–	–	–	–	–	–	–	
Nasser Hejazi	Iran	1984	1984	–	–	–	–	–	–	–	–	
Hassan Habibi	Iran	1984	1984	–	–	–	–	–	–	–	–	
Mansour Pourheidari	Iran	1985	1986	12	8	2	2	16	9	66%	Tehran League: 1985–1986	
Abbas Razavi	Iran	1986	1986	5	4	1	0	8	3	80%	–	
Mansour Pourheidari	Iran	1986	1988	34	20	10	4	46	34	59%	–	
Mohammad Ranjbar	Iran	1988	1988	5	2	2	1	5	4	40%	–	
Gholam Hossein Mazloumi	Iran	1988	1989	21	13	6	2	40	15	62%	–	
Mohammad Salahi	Iran	1 May 1989	1989	13	10	3	0	25	7	77%	–	
Kambiz Jamali	Iran	1989	1989	2	2	0	0	7	0	100%	–	
Mansour Pourheidari	Iran	1989	1992	108	70	30	8	189	52	65%	Qods League: 1989–90; Asian Club Championship: 1990–91; Tehran League: 1991–92	
Bijan Zolfagharnasab	Iran	1992	1993	21	4	13	4	16	18	19%	–	
Ali Jabbari	Iran	1993	1993	2	1	1	0	4	3	50%	–	
Yevgeni Skomorokhov	Russia	1993	1994	30	17	10	3	47	18	56%	–	
Reza Naalchegar	Iran	1994	1994	8	4	4	0	9	5	50%	Tehran Super Cup: 1994	
Leonid Bilofsky	Russia	1994	1994	8	4	0	4	11	11	50%	–	
Reza Naalchegar	Iran	1994	1994	3	1	1	1	6	4	33%	–	
Nasrollah Abdollahi	Iran	1994	1995	16	7	6	3	17	12	44%	–	
Hamid Malekahmadi	Iran	1995	1995	1	0	1	0	2	2	0%	–	
Mansour Pourheidari	Iran	1995	1996	57	29	17	11	86	51	51%	Iran Hazfi Cup: 1995–96	
Nasser Hejazi	Iran	20 November 1996	10 May 1999	84	39	27	18	127	76	46%	Azadegan League: 1997–98	
Javad Zarincheh	Iran	11 May 1999	24 May 1999	4	3	1	0	12	5	75%	–	
Yevgeni Skomorokhov	Russia	5 June 1999	25 February 2000	28	17	7	4	59	14	61%	–	
Mansour Pourheidari	Iran	25 February 2000	22 May 2002	80	46	23	11	158	74	58%	Iran Hazfi Cup: 1999–2000; Azadegan League: 2000–01	
Amir Ghalenoei	Iran	22 May 2002	July 2002	5	3	1	1	12	9	60%	Iran Hazfi Cup: 2001–02	
Roland Koch	Germany	August 2002	20 April 2003	28	13	7	8	38	31	46%	–	
Javad Zarincheh	Iran	24 April 2003	14 May 2003	4	0	1	3	3	7	0%	–	
Mansour Pourheidari	Iran	15 May 2003	1 June 2003	5	1	0	4	5	6	20%	–	
Amir Ghalenoei	Iran	3 July 2003	17 July 2006	95	52	31	12	163	92	55%	Iran Pro League: 2005–06	
Samad Marfavi	Iran	21 July 2006	28 May 2007	31	14	10	7	39	31	45%	–	
Nasser Hejazi	Iran	27 June 2007	4 November 2007	15	6	5	4	26	22	36%	–	
Firouz Karimi	Iran	4 November 2007	15 May 2008	21	6	7	8	25	26	28%	–	
Vacant	–	15 May 2008	16 May 2008	1	0	0	1	1	2	0%	–	
Amir Ghalenoei	Iran	17 May 2008	17 May 2009	45	21	15	9	90	47	47%	Iran Hazfi Cup: 2007–08; Persian Gulf League: 2008–09	
Samad Marfavi	Iran	17 May 2009	19 May 2010	43	20	13	10	77	45	47%	–	
Parviz Mazloumi	Iran	11 June 2010	23 May 2012	92	51	25	16	155	88	55%	Iran Hazfi Cup: 2011–12	
Amir Ghalenoei	Iran	28 May 2012	19 May 2015	123	64	33	26	166	103	52%	Persian Gulf League: 2012–13	
Parviz Mazloumi	Iran	21 June 2015	31 May 2016	35	16	15	4	55	32	46%	–	
Alireza Mansourian	Iran	1 June 2016	20 September 2017	51	24	15	12	66	49	47%	–	
Mick McDermott	Northern Ireland	21 September 2017	2 October 2017	1	1	0	0	2	1	100%	–	
Winfried Schäfer	Germany	2 October 2017	29 April 2019	69	37	21	11	102	42	54%	Iran Hazfi Cup: 2017–18	
Farhad Majidi	Iran	29 April 2019	13 June 2019	5	3	2	0	9	5	60%	–	
Andrea Stramaccioni	Italy	13 June 2019	8 December 2019	15	9	4	2	32	13	60%	–	
Saleh Mostafavi	Iran	9 december 2019	2 January 2020	3	1	1	1	7	5	33%	–	
Farhad Majidi	Iran	2 January 2020	3 September 2020	21	9	8	4	38	22	43%	–	
Majid Namjoo-Motlagh	Iran	6 September 2020	26 September 2020	3	1	1	1	5	3	33%	–	
Mahmoud Fekri	Iran	7 October 2020	2 March 2021	16	7	6	3	19	12	43%	–	
Farhad Majidi	Iran	3 March 2021	3 June 2022	59	35	19	5	78	31	59%	Persian Gulf Pro League: 2021–22	
Ricardo Sá Pinto	Portugal	21 June 2022	7 June 2023	36	23	8	5	63	25	64%	Iranian Super Cup: 2022	
Javad Nekounam	Iran	20 June 2023	1 October 2024	38	21	12	5	49	28	55%	–	
Sohrab Bakhtiarizadeh	Iran	1 October 2024	24 October 2024	3	1	0	2	2	5	33%	–	
Pitso Mosimane	South Africa	24 October 2024	28 January 2025	14	3	7	4	9	13	21%	–	
Sohrab Bakhtiarizadeh	Iran	28 January 2025	20 February 2025	5	3	2	0	7	2	60%	–	
Mohammad Navazi	Iran	20 February 2025	26 February 2025	1	1	0	0	1	0	100%	–	
Miodrag Božović	Montenegro	26 February 2025	23 April 2025	9	0	5	4	7	13	0%	–	
Mojtaba Jabbari	Iran	23 April 2025	23 June 2025	6	4	1	1	10	4	66%	Iran Hazfi Cup: 2024–25	
Ricardo Sá Pinto	Portugal	23 June 2025	20 February 2026	31	12	11	8	39	33	38%		
Voria Ghafouri	Iran	21 February 2026	23 February 2026	1	1	0	0	1	0	100%		
Sohrab Bakhtiarizadeh	Iran	23 February 2026		16	9	6	1	22	9	56%		

== See also ==
- List of Esteghlal F.C. records and statistics
- List of Esteghlal F.C. honours
