= List of Iran national football team managers =

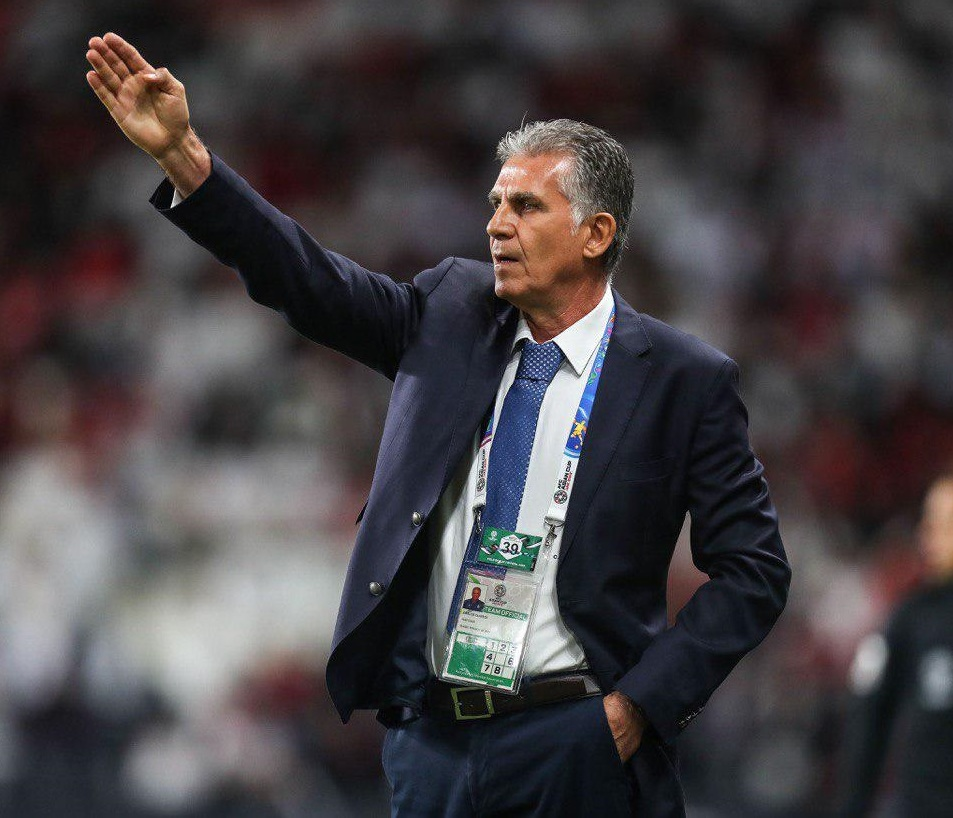
Carlos Queiroz has led the team more than any other manager in the history.

The role of an Iran national football team manager was first established in January 1941 with the appointment of Hossein Sadaghiani.

Forty-seven men have occupied the post since its inception; six of those were in short-term caretaker manager roles: Jalal Cheraghpour (four games in charge), Nasser Ebrahimi (eight games), Homayoun Shahrokhi (five games), Mansour Ebrahimzadeh (three games), Erich Rutemöller (one game) and Ali Reza Mansourian (one game). In comparison, Sadeghiani held the position for the longest to date with a tenure of 10 years, although the team only played 3 official matches during that time. As of May 2019, Carlos Queiroz, has led the team in 100 matches, more than any other manager in Team Melli's history. The most successful manager is Heshmat Mohajerani, winning the 1976 AFC Asian Cup, Quarter Finalist of 1976 Summer Olympics and Qualification for the 1978 FIFA World Cup. Hungarian coach József Mészáros became the first foreign manager of the team in 1959.

Croatia has the largest number of managers to have coached Iran, with over five managers. Several managers also hold dual nationalities, for instance Jalal Talebi and Afshin Ghotbi, who hold both American and Iranian citizenships.

== Position ==
=== Role ===
The Iran manager's role means he has sole responsibility for all on-the-field elements of the Iran team. Among other activities, this includes selecting the national team squad, the starting team, captain, tactics, substitutes and penalty-takers.

The manager is given a free hand in selecting his coaching ("back room") staff. For example, in 2011 Carlos Queiroz appointed two Portugalians (António Simões as assistant coach and Dan Gaspar as goalkeeping coach), two Iranians (Omid Namazi as assistant coach and Markar Aghajanian as scout). and one British (Mick McDermott as fitness coach).

=== Appointment ===
The process of appointing a new Iran manager is undertaken by an FFIRI committee, which is composed of board members and other high-ranking FFIRI officials.

== History ==
=== Hossein Sadeghiani ===
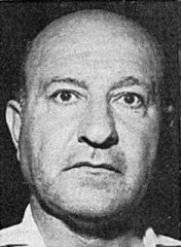
Hossein Sadaghiani

Sadaghiani was the first manager of Iran national team appointed in 1941. He led the team in only three matches with two wins and one loss. His assistant, Mostafa Salimi, was also his successor. Sadeghiani was returned to the coaching staff in 1958 for coaching the team in two matches. He was also the first Iranian that played for foreign clubs, playing for R. Charleroi S.C. and Fenerbahce SK.

=== Mahmoud Bayati ===
A former Taj player and head coach, Bayati was appointed as head coach of Iran national football team in 1967 and led the team in the 1968 AFC Asian Cup. Iran won the title without any loss or draw. He resigned after the tournaments in protest to the then President of Iran Football Federation and was succeeded by Zdravko Rajkov. He was returned to the national team after four years and was re-appointed as head coach in 1972 after the resignation of Mohammad Ranjbar. Bayati led the team in the 1972 Summer Olympics with bad results and was unable to qualify for the 1974 FIFA World Cup. He was sacked as national football team head coach in 1974.

=== Parviz Dehdari ===
He was appointed as head coach of national football team in 1971. He coached the team in Olympic Games in Munich. The team was able to successfully enter the Olympic competition but Dehdari resigned before the tournament. He resigned because of differences he had with his assistant, Mohammad Ranjbar. He was re-appointed as head coach of national team in 1986. He led Team Melli in 1986 Asian Games and 1988 AFC Asian Cup. Team Melli won third place in the 1988 Asian Cup and Dehdari was sacked on 22 January 1989.

=== Mohammad Ranjbar ===
Ranjbar began his coaching career as manager of Iran national under-20 football team in 1968. He was selected as assistant coach of the national football team in 1970 and was again selected as this position in 1971 by Parviz Dehdari. After Dehdari's resignation in 1972, Ranjbar was appointed as caretaker manager of the national team, which he led to the final victory in 1972 AFC Asian Cup. After the team's success with Ranjbar, Iran Football Federation appointed Ranjbar as the team's head coach and signed a two-year contract with him, but he resigned after two months.

=== Heshmat Mohajerani ===
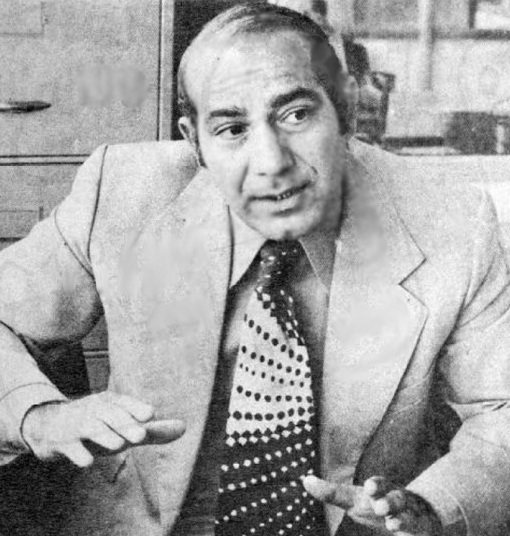
Heshmat Mohajerani

Mohajerani began his coaching career in 1971; he started his coaching career as the Iran U-23 National Team Coach. During his years as coach, he gave numerous opportunities to youths from cities other than the capital and many of those youths, including Nazari, Barzegari, Ghasempour and Pezeshkar found their way into the Team Melli.

Under his coaching and management, Iran won the Asian Youth Championship for 4 consecutive years, while before his time the Youth Team had never won the Asian Championship. This achievement is a record that no other coach has been able to match. After this record with the youth team, Mohajerani was appointed as assistant coach to Irishman Frank O'Farrell.

Mohajerani's first major achievement was winning the 1976 Asian Cup when his team beat Kuwait 1–0 in the final at Azadi Stadium.

Shortly after, the team was qualified for the Montreal Olympic games and for the first time in Iran's history, the team qualified for the next round. The pinnacle of Mohajerani's achievement, however, was the first ever advancement of the Iran national football team to the World Cup in Argentina in 1978.

In the final match of the World Cup preliminary stage, Mohajerani fielded a younger Iranian lineup against the Kuwaiti team, managed by Carlos Alberto and Mário Zagallo, on Kuwait’s home ground. Although Iran had already qualified, the team entered the match unbeaten and won 2–1 against Kuwait’s full-strength squad.

After being drawn into Group 4, Iran lost the opening match 3–0 to the eventual runner-up Netherlands, but managed to draw 1–1 against Scotland, with Iraj Danaeifard scoring Iran's first ever goal at the World Cup and earning their first ever point. In their final game of the tournament, Iran lost 4–1 to Peru with Hassan Rowshan finding the back of the net.

=== Ali Parvin ===
In late 1989 Parvin became the Iranian national team manager. He had already gained experience managing Tehran powerhouse Persepolis FC. At first his popularity grew even more as the team won the 1990 Asian Games football gold medal, but early elimination from the 1992 Asian Cup and failure to qualify for World Cup 1994 cost him his job. He was fired in 1993 and replaced by Stanko Poklepovic.

=== Mohammad Mayeli Kohan ===
After good results with national futsal team, he was elected as manager of Iran national football team after Stanko Poklepović's resignation. He coached the team in 1996 AFC Asian Cup and was ranked in third place.

=== Jalal Talebi ===
He was the head coach of the Iranian national team during the 1998 FIFA World Cup, and the first American to hold this job. Prior to the tournament, he was appointed to replace Tomislav Ivic after Iran lost 1–7 to A.S. Roma in a warm up friendly match. He had held the position of technical director before he was named coach. He stepped down as head coach after the 1998 FIFA World Cup on 20 August 1998, but returned to lead the team again during 2000 Asian Cup in Lebanon. He resigned after Iran's elimination in the tournament.

=== Miroslav Blažević ===
Well known throughout the football world for his 1998 World Cup sensation, Ćiro accepted an offer to lead the Iranian national team midway through the 2002 World Cup qualification process. Coming in ahead of the final qualifying round, he quickly developed a following among many of the Iranian fans. Ćiro kept the 3–5–2 formation that Iran had played with previously in the 96 Asian Cup, in which Iranian national team had won third place. He also introduced new players to Team Melli such as Rahman Rezaei, Javad Nekounam, and Ebrahim Mirzapour. Known as a loudmouth and showman, Blažević stayed true to form by claiming he would hang himself from the goalposts if Iran failed to beat Ireland in the deciding qualification playoff for the 2002 World Cup. Ireland won 2–1 on aggregate, the defeat that marked the end of Blažević's time in Iran as his assistant Branko Ivanković took over.

=== Branko Ivanković ===
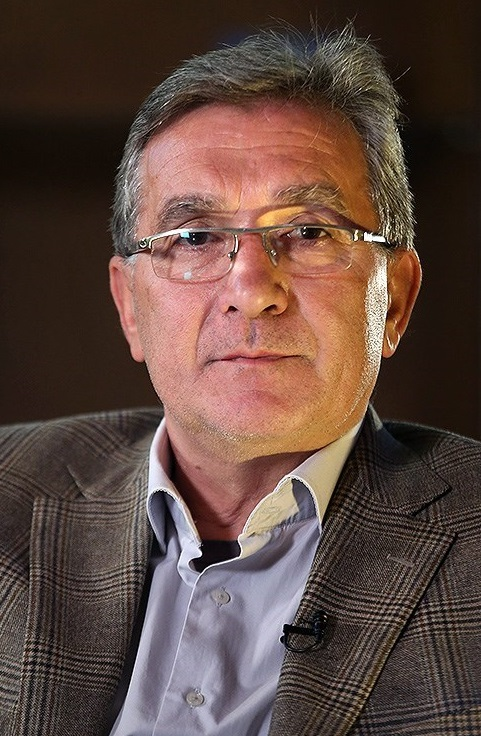
Branko Ivanković

Ivanković was appointed to the head of the Iranian team on 29 January 2002. Under Ivanković, Iran's U23 football team won the 2002 Asian Games in Pusan. He remained the coach of the national team until the end of 2002, when he was replaced by Homayun Shahrokhi.

Ivanković had become very popular in Iran and the public media demanded a contract renewal, but the Football Federation was initially reluctant to appoint him as the head coach. Finally, after a period of negotiations he was reappointed as the head coach of Iran on 3 October 2003.

Ivankovic led Iran to 2004 AFC Asian Cup third place. after finishing second in their group behind eventual champions Japan, whom they drew, and being eliminated in the semis on penalties to the hosts.

Ivanković also led Iran to qualify for the 2006 World Cup, the third time in the country's history (they had previously been eliminated in the first round in 1978 and 1998).

Despite him being the most successful coach of the Iranian National Team in terms of winning percentage, Ivankovic was not liked by the Iranian government who deliberately tried to replace him with a native coach.

The Ministry for Physical Education, which is a governmental watchdog on sports, tried to replace the coach before the World cup in Germany. However the Football federation of Iran resisted the pressure and kept Ivankovic for the 2006 FIFA World Cup.

Iran, at their opening game at the World Cup, showed a scintillating first half performance against Mexico, but conceded two goals in the second half to lose 1-3. The second match against Portugal was not successful either, with Iran conceding two late goals to lose 2–0 and being left without any chances of advancing to the second stage of the tournament. Mexico drew against Angola on the previous evening and left Iran at an unreachable four points behind. So, the third group match against Angola became insignificant for Iran. Angola put themselves into the lead with the opening goal after one hour of playing. The Iranians managed to equalise fifteen minutes later, eventually scoring their only point at the 2006 World Cup since the match ended in a 1–1 draw. This point was, however, only enough for Iran to occupy the last place in their group.

After the World Cup, MPE removed the Head of the Football federation of Iran, replacing Branko Ivanković with Amir Qalenoei. This in turn resulted a FIFA suspension for Iran's football due to political interference.

=== Amir Ghalenoei ===
Ghalenoei was appointed as manager of the Iran national football team on July 17, 2006, to succeed Branko Ivanković. After a quarterfinals finish during the 2007 Asian Cup, Ghalenoei was on the outs as Team Melli manager late in the year. Iran lost out to South Korea in a penalty shoot-out. Ghalenoei was after the game heavily criticized for substituting the goalkeeper just prior to the shoot-out.

=== Ali Daei ===
On 2 March 2008 IRIFF officially appointed Ali Daei as Team Melli's new head coach. Despite admitting that his appointment as manager of the Iranian national team was a "surprise", Daei refused to leave his current coaching job at Saipa F.C., therefore taking on dual managerial careers until after Saipa had entered the Asian Champion League quarterfinals, after which Daei left Saipa by mutual consent. While Daei guided Iran to a respectable 16–6–3 mark, his third loss on 28 March 2009 to a Saudi Arabian team that was down 1–0 to Iran in Tehran proved to be the final straw. During his tenure as the National Team coach, the Iranian team managed the weakest World Cup Qualification results in its history with only one win out of 5 WCQ games. After the loss in the 2010 World Cup Qualifier, Daei was fired as head coach after the match. While introducing many new players such as Gholamreza Rezaei, and Ehsan Hajysafi, Daei's squad was often in flux as to who would be invited to a fixture. As well, many critics pointed towards the failures of Daei's team to score and an unsolved weakness in the central defense as causes for his downfall.

=== Afshin Ghotbi ===
After just three weeks after being announced as manager, Mayeli Kohan became the spearhead of a heated dispute between himself and Esteghlal F.C. manager Amir Ghalenoei. This resulted in the IRIFF forcing Mayeli Kohan's resignation as manager of Team Melli. A week later, Afshin Ghotbi, an Iranian-American, agreed to succeed Mayeli Kohan as head coach of the Iranian national team, became the second American to take the job. After this appointment, Ghotbi said in an interview "A life dream, a longtime ambition and a journey written in the stars is about to be realized I have to thank all the people around the world who have cheered, supported and inspired me to have this opportunity." However, under Afshin Ghotbi, Iran failed to qualify for the 2010 World Cup in South Africa. This was in spite of the team's reasonable performance, gaining 5 points from 3 games. His contract has now been renewed to continue coaching Team Melli. He continued to coach Team Melli in 2011 AFC Asian Cup qualification where he won 3 matches out of 4 and lost the other one to Jordan Away, in which the team earned 13 points and qualified as the group leaders. But he had some results in the friendlies (such as winning against Bosnia-Herzegovina and China and South Korea in their land), which surprisingly caused a lot of criticism and even some people in IRIFF decided to replace him as Iranian coach and journalists could not accept an American-Iranian success over Team-melli. However, after a few days his job was secured and the Iranian Federation decided to keep him at least up to 2011 Asian Cup. He had poor results in the friendlies at the beginning and then was able to qualify for the 2011 Asian Cup and slowly improved the results. In 2010 his team was able to win 8 matches in a row and gain trust. Later on he finished second in West Asian Football Federation Championship 2010. His team won all three matches in the group stage of 2011 Asian Cup, but got knocked out after the extra time goal against Korea Republic and this finished his era.

=== Carlos Queiroz ===
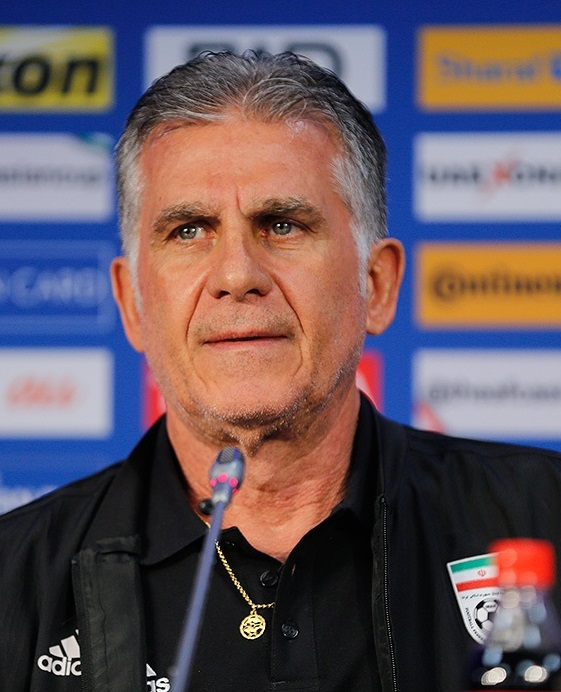
Carlos Queiroz

On 4 April 2011, Carlos Queiroz agreed to a two-and-a-half-year deal to coach the Iran national football team until the end of the 2014 FIFA World Cup in Brazil alongside goalkeeping coach Dan Gaspar and assistant coach Omid Namazi. Iran, under Queiroz, began their World Cup qualification campaign successfully, defeating the Maldives 4–0 in the first leg of their second round of qualifiers. After winning 5–0 on aggregate, Iran advanced to the third round of qualifiers, where they were drawn with Indonesia, Qatar and Bahrain. Iran highlighted their position at the top of their group by defeating Bahrain 6–0 at home in the Azadi Stadium, as well as inviting former German youth international, Ashkan Dejagah, who scored twice on his debut against Qatar. After a 4–1 win at Indonesia, Iran qualified for the final round of direct qualifiers, the fourth round. In the fourth round, Iran was drawn with South Korea, Qatar, Uzbekistan, and Lebanon in their group. Queiroz made new foreign-based additions to his squad, adding players such as Reza Ghoochannejhad to his team. Iran started their fourth round of Asian qualifiers with a hard-fought 1–0 win in Uzbekistan, by an injury time goal of Mohammad Reza Khalatbari. Team Melli then drew Qatar at home before suffered a denting lost in Lebanon 1–0, Iran's first-ever goal conceded and also the country's first loss to Lebanon, before defeating South Korea at the Azadi on 16 October with a goal from captain Javad Nekounam. After a shock 1–0 loss in Tehran against Uzbekistan, Iran defeated Qatar 1–0 in Doha and Lebanon 4–0 at home. In their last qualification match, Iran defeated South Korea 1–0 in Ulsan Munsu with a goal from European-based Ghoochannejhad, resulting in their qualification to the 2014 FIFA World Cup as group winners with 16 points. Thus, Iran became the third team that Queiroz has managed to qualify for the World Cup, having reached the 2002 edition with South Africa and the 2010 edition with Portugal, leading the latter to a knockout stage finish. Iran continued their winning streak, securing qualification to the 2015 Asian Cup months later as the highest ranked seed.

Since Queiroz's role as manager of the Iranian national team, he has been renowned for introducing players from the Iranian diaspora to the national squad. These players include German-Iranians Daniel Davari and Ashkan Dejagah, Dutch-Iranian Reza Ghoochannejhad, Swedish-Iranian Omid Nazari, and Iranian-American Steven Beitashour among others.

Iran qualified for the 2014 FIFA World Cup as group winners and competed in Group F alongside Argentina, Nigeria, and Bosnia and Herzegovina. On 1 June 2014, Queiroz announced his 23-man squad. Prior to the tournament, they founded the Central Asian Football Association. In the opening match of the tournament on 16 June, Iran drew Nigeria 0–0, making it their first clean sheet of the FIFA World Cup. In their next match, Iran was defeated by Argentina 1–0 with a late goal from Lionel Messi, and received praise after holding Argentina for 90 minutes while creating some attacking opportunities of their own. Iran was eliminated from the tournament in their next game, a 3–1 defeat to Bosnia and Herzegovina. Iran's lone goal was scored by Reza Ghoochannejhad. After the tournament, Queiroz extended his contract until the 2018 FIFA World Cup.

Iran qualified for the 2015 AFC Asian Cup as group winners, where they were the highest ranked seed. Iran faced Bahrain, Qatar, and the UAE in Group C. With the second highest number of fans in the tournament after hosts Australia, the Iranians defeated Bahrain 2–0 with limited preparations. A defensive minded Iran then defeated Qatar 1–0 thanks to a Sardar Azmoun goal before defeating the UAE by the same scoreline to reach the top of their group. In the quarter-finals Iran faced rivals Iraq, who they had beaten weeks prior in a friendly match. Having received a controversial red card in the first half from referee Ben Williams, Iran led a valiant effort with ten men, scoring two goals late in extra time to draw the match 3–3. In the ensuing penalty shootout, Iran lost 7–6 in sudden death.

Iran began their 2018 FIFA World Cup qualification campaign with friendly matches against Chile and Sweden in March 2015. Queiroz resigned from his managerial post thereafter due to disagreements with the Iranian Football Federation. On 14 April 2015, Iran were drawn with Oman, India, Turkmenistan, and Guam in the second round of qualifiers. On 26 April, Queiroz announced that he will continue as the manager of Iran for their 2018 World Cup campaign.

Iran's 2018 World Cup run was the most successful in their history of FIFA World Cup qualifications. With Queiroz took charge, with Iran managed to easily top the group, only being held draw twice by Turkmenistan and Oman away and won all the remaining games. In the third round, Iran was drawn together with South Korea, Uzbekistan, China, Qatar and Syria. This time, Iran went being undefeated throughout the qualification, managing seven wins out of ten and only conceded goals in the final game against Syria at home when Iran had already guaranteed a place in Russia. This led to stronger enthusiasm for Iran in the 2018 FIFA World Cup.

Yet, despite high expectation, Iran was once again denied a place to reach the World Cup's knockout stage. Sharing group B with powerhouse Spain, Portugal and African opponent Morocco, Iran gained its first major World Cup win after 20 years in the match against Morocco, thanked to Aziz Bouhaddouz's own goal. Iran then faced up Spain, where the Iranians bravely defended until getting slumped by a goal from Diego Costa that led Iran to suffer a heartbreaking 1–0 loss. In the last game against Portugal, Iran held Cristiano Ronaldo's side 1–1 with a penalty in 90+4', and Alireza Beiranvand made headline with a heroic penalty save from Ronaldo as well, thus gave Iran four points, the country's best performance ever in the World Cup. However, with Morocco and Spain held draw 2–2, it was not enough to seal Iran in at the expense of two Iberian opponents. Following the World Cup, Queiroz announced he would resign from the Iranian team.

He last led Iran in a major tournament occurred at the 2019 AFC Asian Cup where Iran took group D along with Iraq, Vietnam and Yemen. The Iranians started their campaign comfortably, with a 5–0 demolition of Yemen, before beating Vietnam 2–0 to reach the round of sixteen. In the knockout stage, Iran proved to be a stubborn yet solid at defense, beating Oman and China on their way. But in the semi-finals facing up Japan, Iran could not hold their temper and got whipped by the Japanese in a disappointing 0–3 defeat. This crushing defeat was the last game of Queiroz for Iran, which he fulfilled by resigning from the team after the match.

=== Marc Wilmots ===
Belgian manager Marc Wilmots was appointed to lead Iran in the 2022 FIFA World Cup qualification where they were grouped with Bahrain, Iraq, Cambodia and Hong Kong. Iran played two friendlies against Syria at home and South Korea away, both with positive results. The trend continued in their first stage of the World Cup qualification games when Iran easily whipped Hong Kong 2–0 at home before creating their biggest World Cup win since 2002, a 14–0 victory over Cambodia at home. (The latter was the first time women were allowed to enter Iranian stadiums.) Iran however were unable to build on these achievements. The team suffered two shock losses to Arab rivals Bahrain and Iraq, both away, which put Iran in danger of not qualifying to the World Cup. Wilmots resigned as Team Melli Manager when his wages weren't paid on time, and he left Iran and filed a claim with FIFA. FIFA arbitrated and ordered the Iranian football federation to pay Marc Wilmots €6,137,500 as compensation for breach of contract plus 5% interest.

== Statistics ==
As of 17 November 2026

- caretaker^{♦}

Name	Nat	From	To	P	W	D	L	Win%	Tournaments	
Hossein Sadaghiani	(Iran)	15 January 1941	5 March 1951	3	1	1	1	33.33		
Mostafa Salimi	(Iran)	5 March 1951	2 April 1952	5	2	2	1	40.00	1951 Asian Games	Silver Medal
József Mészáros	(Hungary)	5 December 1957	18 December 1959	6	3	1	2	50.00	1958 Asian Games	14th Place
Hossein Fekri	(Iran)	1 June 1961	16 March 1966	8	1	4	3	12.50	1964 Summer Olympics	12th Place
György Szűcs	(Hungary)	10 September 1966	24 November 1967	7	4	0	3	57.14	1966 Asian Games	Silver Medal
Hossein Fekri	(Iran)	24 November 1967	26 November 1967	2	1	0	1	50.00		
Mahmoud Bayati	(Iran)	26 November 1967	7 March 1969	4	4	0	0	100.00	1968 Asian Cup	Winners
Zdravko Rajkov	(Socialist Federal Republic of Yugoslavia)	7 March 1969	17 September 1970	5	4	0	1	80.00		
Igor Netto	(Soviet Union)	4 November 1970	10 September 1971	3	0	1	2	0.00	1970 Asian Games	8th Place
Parviz Dehdari	(Iran)	10 September 1971	7 May 1972	2	1	0	1	50.00		
Mohammad Ranjbar	(Iran)	7 May 1972	25 June 1972	9	5	1	3	55.56	1972 Asian Cup	Winners
Mahmoud Bayati	(Iran)	26 June 1972	17 January 1974	9	5	2	2	55.56	1972 Summer Olympics	12th Place
Danny McLennan	(Scotland)	17 January 1974	3 September 1974	2	1	0	1	50.00		
Frank O'Farrell	(Republic of Ireland)	3 September 1974	10 August 1975	9	7	0	2	77.78	1974 Asian Games	Gold Medal
Heshmat Mohajerani	(Iran)	10 August 1975	6 September 1978	28	15	7	6	53.57	1976 Asian Cup	Winners
Heshmat Mohajerani	(Iran)	10 August 1975	6 September 1978	28	15	7	6	53.57	1976 Summer Olympics	Quarter Finals
Heshmat Mohajerani	(Iran)	10 August 1975	6 September 1978	28	15	7	6	53.57	1978 WC	14th Place
Hassan Habibi	(Iran)	12 March 1979	29 September 1980	8	5	2	1	62.50	1980 Asian Cup	3rd place
Nasser Ebrahimi	(Iran)	19 February 1982	25 February 1982	4	4	0	0	100.00		
Jalal Cheraghpour^{♦}	(Iran)	1 March 1982	25 November 1982	4	2	0	2	50.00	1982 Asian Games	8th Place
Mahmoud Yavari	(Iran)	7 August 1984	1 December 1984	6	6	0	0	100.00		
Nasser Ebrahimi^{♦}	(Iran)	1 December 1984	16 February 1985	8	2	4	2	25.00	1984 Asian Cup	4th place
Fereydoun Asgarzadeh	(Iran)	11 February 1986	21 February 1986	2	2	0	0	100.00		
Parviz Dehdari	(Iran)	March 1986	22 January 1989	20	10	6	4	50.00	1986 Asian Games	6th Place
Parviz Dehdari	(Iran)	March 1986	22 January 1989	20	10	6	4	50.00	1988 Asian Cup	3rd place
Reza Vatankhah	(Iran)	22 January 1989	17 March 1989	3	3	0	0	100.00		
Mehdi Monajati	(Iran)	30 May 1989	22 July 1989	3	2	0	1	66.67		
Ali Parvin	(Iran)	1 November 1989	28 October 1993	34	15	11	8	44.12	1990 Asian Games	Gold Medal
Ali Parvin	(Iran)	1 November 1989	28 October 1993	34	15	11	8	44.12	1992 Asian Cup	5th Place
Stanko Poklepović	(Croatia)	3 October 1994	26 April 1996	4	1	2	1	25.00	1994 Asian Games	9th Place
Mohammad Mayeli Kohan	(Iran)	26 April 1996	7 November 1997	38	23	9	6	60.53	1996 Asian Cup	3rd place
Valdeir Vieira	(Brazil)	16 November 1997	28 November 1997	3	0	2	1	0.00		
Tomislav Ivić	(Croatia)	28 November 1997	22 April 1998	5	1	2	2	20.00		
Jalal Talebi	(Iran) (United States)	3 June 1998	13 October 1998	4	1	0	3	25.00	1998 WC	20th Place
Mansour Pourheidari	(Iran)	13 October 1998	22 March 2000	17	9	5	3	52.94	1998 Asian Games	Gold Medal
Jalal Talebi	(Iran) (United States)	22 March 2000	1 January 2001	21	13	5	3	61.90	2000 Asian Cup	Quarterfinals
Ademar Braga	(Brazil)	1 January 2001	19 January 2001	3	3	0	0	100.00		
Miroslav Blažević	(Bosnia and Herzegovina) (Croatia)	24 April 2001	6 February 2002	19	10	4	5	52.63		
Branko Ivanković	(Croatia)	6 February 2002	4 February 2003	10	4	4	2	40.00		
Homayoun Shahrokhi^{♦}	(Iran)	4 February 2003	26 September 2003	5	1	1	3	20.00		
Branko Ivanković	(Croatia)	26 September 2003	21 June 2006	42	29	6	7	69.05	2004 Asian Cup	3rd place
Branko Ivanković	(Croatia)	26 September 2003	21 June 2006	42	29	6	7	69.05	2006 WC	25th place
Amir Ghalenoei	(Iran)	8 August 2006	22 December 2007	17	10	6	1	58.82	2007 Asian Cup	Quarterfinals
Mansour Ebrahimzadeh^{♦}	(Iran)	10 January 2008	20 March 2008	3	0	3	0	0.00		
Ali Daei	(Iran)	20 March 2008	28 March 2009	24	15	6	3	62.50		
Erich Rutemöller	(Germany)	1 April 2009	1 April 2009	1	0	1	0	0.00		
Afshin Ghotbi	(Iran) (United States)	22 April 2009	22 January 2011	30	16	6	8	53.33	2011 Asian Cup	Quarterfinals
Carlos Queiroz	(Portugal)	4 April 2011	28 January 2019	100	60	27	13	60.00	2014 WC	28th Place
Carlos Queiroz	(Portugal)	4 April 2011	28 January 2019	100	60	27	13	60.00	2015 Asian Cup	Quarterfinals
Carlos Queiroz	(Portugal)	4 April 2011	28 January 2019	100	60	27	13	60.00	2018 WC	18th Place
Carlos Queiroz	(Portugal)	4 April 2011	28 January 2019	100	60	27	13	60.00	2019 Asian Cup	Semifinals
Marc Wilmots	(Belgium)	22 May 2019	6 December 2019	6	3	1	2	50.00		
Dragan Skočić	(Croatia)	6 February 2020	7 September 2022	18	15	1	2	83.33		
Carlos Queiroz	(Portugal)	7 September 2022	30 November 2022	6	3	1	2	50.00	2022 WC	26th Place
Amir Ghalenoei	(Iran)	12 March 2023		52	32	13	7	61.53	2023 Asian Cup	Semifinals
Amir Ghalenoei	(Iran)	12 March 2023		52	32	13	7	61.53	2026 WC	33th Place

=== By nationality ===
Country	Managers
Iran	23
Croatia	5
Brazil	2
Hungary	2
United States	2
Belgium	1
Bosnia and Herzegovina	1
Germany	1
Ireland	1
Portugal	1
Russia	1
Scotland	1
Serbia	1
