= 1993–94 Esteghlal F.C. season =

Esteghlal
1993–94 season
- President: Kazem Oliaei
- Head coach: Yevgeni Skomorokhov
- Stadium: Azadi Stadium
- League 3: 1st
- Hazfi Cup: Quarter Final
- Tehran Super Cup: Winners
- Top goalscorer: League: Abbas Sarkhab (10); All: Abbas Sarkhab (11)
Home colours	Away colours

The 1993–94 season was the Esteghlal Football Club's first season in the League 3, and the only absence in the top division of Iranian football. Esteghlal was also competing in the Hazfi Cup, and it was its 49th year in existence as a football club.

== Player ==
As of 29 September 2018.

Note: Flags indicate national team as defined under FIFA eligibility rules; some limited exceptions apply. Players may hold more than one non-FIFA nationality.

No.	Pos.	Nation	Player
—	GK	IRN	Hamid Babazadeh
—	GK	IRN	Hossein Torabpour
—	GK	IRN	Pirouz Joghtapour
—	DF	IRN	Javad Zarincheh
—	MF	IRN	Ghasem Sianaki
—	DF	IRN	Shahin Bayani
—	MF	IRN	Iman Alami
—	FW	IRN	Abbas Sarkhab
—	MF	IRN	Mahmoud Fekri
—	MF	IRN	Mohammad Reza Mehranpour
—	MF	IRN	Ali Hajakbari
—	MF	IRN	Ghasem Keshavarz
—	DF	IRN	Mohammad Nouri

No.	Pos.	Nation	Player
—	DF	IRN	Reza Hassanzadeh
—	MF	IRN	Kourosh Tashtzar
—	MF	IRN	Jamshid Amirkhanlou
—		IRN	Jaures Ghazaryan
—	MF	IRN	Amir Ghalenoei
—	DF	IRN	Masoud Ghafourihaye-Asl
—	DF	IRN	Sadegh Varmazyar
—	DF	IRN	Mehdi Pashazadeh
—		IRN	Mohammad Reza Haddadi
—	DF	IRN	Hamid Sarabadani
—	FW	IRN	Kamyar Kardar
—	MF	IRN	Shahrokh Bayani

== Pre-season and friendlies ==
20 May 1993	Esteghlal Shahrud	0–4	Esteghlal	Shahrud
				Stadium: Takhti; Referee: Mostafa Haghighati

2 June 1993	Esteghlal	3–2	Malavan	Tehran
				Stadium: Azadi

4 June 1993	Esteghlal (Iran)	1–2	(Brazil) Grêmio	Tehran, Iran
	Sarkhab 43'		Caio 30', 54'	Stadium: Azadi; Attendance: 20,000; Referee: Hossein Khoshkhan

11 October 1993	Esteghlal	0–1	Motahed Tehran	Tehran
				Stadium: Ekbatan; Referee: Kamal Noazar

29 January 1994	Keshavarz Minab	0–4	Esteghlal	Bandar Abbas

31 January 1994	Sahel Bandar Abbas	0–3	Esteghlal	Bandar Abbas

=== Naghsh-e Jahan Isfahan ===
9 June 1993 1	Esteghlal	2–2	Fath Tehran	Isfahan
				Stadium: 22 Bahman; Attendance: 15,000; Referee: Manouchehr Ildrum

12 June 1993 2	Tractor Sazi	2–3	Esteghlal	Isfahan
				Stadium: 22 Bahman; Referee: Mehdi Akhavan

14 June 1993 3	Siman Sepahan	2–2	Esteghlal	Isfahan
				Stadium: 22 Bahman; Referee: Javad Fasihfar

17 June 1993 Semi-finals	Esteghlal	0–2	Ararat	Isfahan
				Stadium: 22 Bahman; Attendance: 20,000; Referee: Mehdi Akhavan

18 June 1993 Third place	Zob Ahan	0–1	Esteghlal	Isfahan
				Stadium: 22 Bahman; Attendance: 10,000; Referee: Mostafa Daneshvar

=== Kuwait Friendship Cup ===
This tournament was held in Kuwait on the occasion of the farewell of Mahboub Juma'a, the captain of Al-Salmiya and the Kuwait national football team.

13 October 1993 1	Al-Kuwait	1–0	(Iran) Esteghlal	Kuwait City, Kuwait
	Zidane 35'			Stadium: Al Kuwait Sports Club

15 October 1993 2	Al-Ismaily (Egypt)	3–1	(Iran) Esteghlal	Kuwait City, Kuwait
			Mehranpour	Stadium: Al Kuwait Sports Club

17 October 1993 3	Al-Salmiya (Kuwait)	0–1	(Iran) Esteghlal	Kuwait City, Kuwait
			Iman Alami 75'	Stadium: Al Kuwait Sports Club

== Competitions ==
=== League 3 ===
==== First round ====
Group B

===== Standings =====
Pos	Team	Pld	W	D	L	GF	GA	GD	Pts	Qualification
1	Esteghlal	14	11	2	1	32	9	+23	24	Qualification for the Second round
2	Shamoushak Noshahr	14	11	1	2	28	7	+21	23	
3	Aboomoslem	14	6	3	5	23	18	+5	15	
4	Ostandar Urmia	14	4	5	5	18	15	+3	13	
5	Basij Zanjan	14	4	1	9	15	22	−7	9	
6	Aluminium Sazi Arak	14	3	2	9	15	27	−12	8	
7	Javid Karaj	14	2	3	9	7	24	−17	7	
8	Rah Ahan Shahrud	14	2	3	9	15	32	−17	7	

Source: Competitions

===== Matches =====
1	Esteghlal	1–1	Ostandar Urmia

2	Rah Ahan Shahrud	0–4	Esteghlal

3	Esteghlal	2–1	Shamoushak Noshahr

4	Esteghlal	3–0	Basij Zanjan

5	Javid Karaj	1–3	Esteghlal

6	Esteghlal	5–0	Aluminium Sazi Arak

7	Aboomoslem	1–2	Esteghlal

8	Ostandar Urmia	1–1	Esteghlal

9	Esteghlal	5–1	Rah Ahan Shahrud

10	Shamoushak Noshahr	1–0	Esteghlal

11	Basij Zanjan	0–1	Esteghlal

12	Esteghlal	1–0	Javid Karaj

13	Aluminium Sazi Arak	1–2	Esteghlal

14	Esteghlal	2–1	Aboomoslem

==== Second round ====
Group A

===== Standings =====
Pos	Team	Pld	W	D	L	GF	GA	GD	Pts	Qualification
1	Esteghlal	6	2	3	1	10	6	+4	7	Qualification for the Semi-final round
2	Tolypers Qazvin	6	2	3	1	8	7	+1	7	
3	Poora	6	2	2	2	6	5	+1	6	
4	Iranjavan Bushehr	6	1	2	3	6	12	−6	4	

Source: Competitions

===== Matches =====
1	Esteghlal	0–0	Poora

2	Esteghlal	6–2	Iranjavan Bushehr

3	Tolypers Qazvin	2–1	Esteghlal

4	Poora	0–1	Esteghlal

5	Iranjavan Bushehr	1–1	Esteghlal

6	Esteghlal	1–1	Tolypers Qazvin

==== Semi-final ====
First leg	Esteghlal	1–0	Pars Khodro

Second leg	Pars Khodro	0–1 (0 – 2 agg.)	Esteghlal

==== Final ====
First leg	Esteghlal	0–0	Polyacryl

Second leg	Polyacryl	0–1 (0 – 1 agg.)	Esteghlal

=== Hazfi Cup ===
==== Round of 64 ====
30 April 1993 First leg	Rah Ahan Shahrud	1–1	Esteghlal	Shahrud
				Stadium: Takhti

7 May 1993 Second leg	Esteghlal	3–2 (4–3 agg.)	Ararat Tehran	Tehran
				Stadium: Azadi; Attendance: 15,000

==== Round of 32 ====
14 May 1993 First leg	Esteghlal	1–1	Payam Khorasan	Tehran
				Stadium: Azadi; Attendance: 25,000

24 May 1993 Second leg	Payam Khorasan	(w/o) (1–4 agg.)	Esteghlal	Mashhad
				Stadium: Azadi; Attendance: 4,000

==== Round of 16 ====
26 July 1993 First leg	Nassaji Mazandaran	1–1	Esteghlal	Qaem Shahr
				Stadium: Vatani; Attendance: 25,000

15 May 1993 Second leg	Esteghlal	0–0 (1–1 agg.)	Nassaji Mazandaran	Tehran
				Stadium: Azadi; Attendance: 5,000

==== Quarter Final ====
5 November 1993 First leg	Jonoob Ahvaz	0–0	Esteghlal	Ahvaz
				Stadium: Takhti; Attendance: 25,000

15 November 1993 Second leg	Esteghlal	0–1 (0–1 agg.)	Jonoob Ahvaz	Tehran
				Stadium: Azadi; Attendance: 45,000

=== Tehran Super Cup ===
==== Standings ====
Pos	Team	Pld	W	D	L	GF	GA	GD	Pts	Qualification or relegation
1	Esteghlal	6	4	2	0	9	5	+4	10	Champion
2	Keshavarz	6	4	1	1	14	6	+8	9	
3	Bank Tejarat	6	2	3	1	12	11	+1	7	
4	PAS	6	1	4	1	10	9	+1	6	
5	Pars Khodro	6	1	3	2	10	10	0	5	
6	Ararat Tehran	6	1	1	4	6	12	−6	3	
7	Poora	6	0	2	4	6	14	−8	2	

Source: Competitions

==== Matches ====
28 April 1994 1	Esteghlal	0 – 0	Bank Tejarat	Tehran
				Stadium: Azadi Stadium

8 May 1994 2	Poora	3 – 2	Esteghlal	Tehran
				Stadium: Azadi Stadium

13 May 1994 3	Esteghlal	1 – 1	PAS	Tehran
				Stadium: Azadi Stadium

20 May 1994 4	Pars Khodro	3 – 2	Esteghlal	Tehran
				Stadium: Azadi Stadium

25 May 1994 5	Esteghlal	1 – 0	Keshavarz	Tehran
				Stadium: Azadi Stadium

29 May 1994 6	Ararat Tehran	1 – 0	Esteghlal	Tehran
				Stadium: Azadi Stadium
