= Faramarz Zelli =

Iranian footballer (1942–2025)

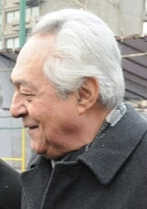
- Zelli in 2012

Personal information
- Date of birth: 1 June 1942
- Place of birth: Tehran, Iran
- Date of death: 1 April 2025 (aged 82)
- Place of death: Tehran, Iran
- Position: Goalkeeper

Youth career
- 1958–1959: Shargh

Senior career*
Years	Team	Apps	(Gls)
1962–1964	Kian		
1964–1970	PAS Tehran		
1970–1972	Taj		

International career
1962–1969	Iran	2	(0)
- * Club domestic league appearances and goals

Faramarz Zelli (Persian: فرامرز ظلی, 1 June 1942 – 1 April 2025) was an Iranian footballer who played as a goalkeeper. For the Iran national team he participated in the 1966 Asian Games.

== Background ==
Zelli was born in Tehran, Iran on 1 June 1942. He died in Tehran on 1 April 2025, at the age of 82.

== Club career ==
Zelli played for Kian Tehran, PAS Tehran, Taj Tehran and the Iran national team.
