= 1971–72 Local League =

Local League
- Season: 1971–72
- Champions: Persepolis Tehran
- Asian Club Championship: Persepolis Tehran
- Top goalscorer: Hossein Kalani (12); Safar Iranpak (12)

The 1971–72 season was the second and last season of the Local League of Iranian football. The competition was won by Persepolis Football Club of Tehran.

== Qualifying Tournament ==
=== Region A ===
==== Group A ====
Pos	Team	Pld	W	D	L	GF	GA	GD	Pts	Qualification
1	Taj Tehran	2	2	0	0	3	0	+3	4	Advance to Semifinals
2	Taj Noshahr	2	0	1	1	1	2	−1	1	Advance to Semifinals
3	Taj Rasht	2	0	1	1	1	3	−2	1	

==== Group B ====
Pos	Team	Pld	W	D	L	GF	GA	GD	Pts	Qualification
1	Taj Gonbad	3	2	1	0	7	2	+5	5	Advance to Semifinals
2	Machine Sazi Tabriz	3	1	1	1	3	3	0	3	Advance to Semifinals
3	Khane Javanan Isfahan	3	1	1	1	2	6	−4	3	
4	Sam Lahijan	3	0	1	2	2	5	−3	1	

==== Semifinals ====
Taj Gonbad	2–3	Taj Noshahr

Taj Tehran	3–1	Machine Sazi Tabriz

==== Third place play-off ====
Machine Sazi Tabriz	3–0	Taj Gonbad

==== Final ====
Taj Tehran	5–0	Taj Noshahr

(P) Taj Tehran and Taj Noshahr Promoted to the Final round.

=== Region B ===
==== Group A ====
Pos	Team	Pld	W	D	L	GF	GA	GD	Pts	Qualification
1	Taj Masjed Soleyman	2	1	1	0	4	1	+3	3	Advance to Semifinals
2	Arya Mashhad	2	1	1	0	2	1	+1	3	Advance to Semifinals
3	Pas Hamedan	2	0	0	2	0	4	−4	0	

==== Group B ====
Pos	Team	Pld	W	D	L	GF	GA	GD	Pts	Qualification
1	Persepolis	2	2	0	0	11	0	+11	4	Advance to Semifinals
2	Pas Kermanshah	2	1	0	1	3	5	−2	2	Advance to Semifinals
3	Taj Sanandaj	2	0	0	2	0	9	−9	0	

==== Semifinals ====
Persepolis	9–0	Arya Mashhad

Taj Masjed Soleyman	3–1	Pas Kermanshah

==== Third place play-off ====
Pas Kermanshah	3–0	Arya Mashhad

==== Final ====
Persepolis	3–0	Taj Masjed Soleyman

(P) Persepolis and Taj Masjed Soleyman Promoted to the Final round.

=== Region C ===
==== Group A ====
Pos	Team	Pld	W	D	L	GF	GA	GD	Pts	Qualification
1	Pas Tehran	2	2	0	0	9	0	+9	4	Advance to Semifinals
2	Taj Ahvaz	2	1	0	1	1	6	−5	2	Advance to Semifinals
3	Pas Mashhad	2	0	0	2	0	4	−4	0	

==== Group B ====
Pos	Team	Pld	W	D	L	GF	GA	GD	Pts	Qualification
1	Sepahan	2	1	1	0	5	0	+5	3	Advance to Semifinals
2	Tractor Sazi Tabriz	2	1	1	0	2	1	+1	3	Advance to Semifinals
3	Pas Borojerd	2	0	0	2	1	7	−6	0	

==== Semifinals ====
Sepahan	2–0	Taj Ahvaz

Pas Tehran	4–0	Tractor Sazi Tabriz

==== Third place play-off ====
Tractor Sazi Tabriz	1–2	Taj Ahvaz

==== Final ====
Pas Tehran	6–0	Sepahan

(P) Pas Tehran and Sepahan Promoted to the Final round.

=== Region D ===
==== Group A ====
Pos	Team	Pld	W	D	L	GF	GA	GD	Pts	Qualification
1	Jam Abadan	3	2	1	0	10	2	+8	5	Advanve to Semifinals
2	Taj Kohgiloye	3	0	3	0	2	2	0	3	Advanve to Semifinals
3	Give Bandar Pahlavi	3	1	1	1	5	7	−2	3	
3	Nassaji Shahi	3	0	1	2	3	9	−6	1	

==== Group B ====
Pos	Team	Pld	W	D	L	GF	GA	GD	Pts	Qualification
1	Oghab Tehran	3	3	0	0	9	2	+7	6	Advance to Semifinals
2	Bargh Shiraz	3	2	0	1	10	5	+5	4	Advance to Semifinals
3	Anestito Kerman	3	1	0	2	4	5	−1	2	
4	Pas Bandar Abbas	3	0	0	3	2	13	−11	0	

==== Semifinals ====
Bargh Shiraz	1–3	Jam Abadan

Oghab Tehran	2–1	Taj Kohgiloye

==== Third place play-off ====
Bargh Shiraz	6–1	Taj Kohgiloye

==== Final ====
Jam Abadan	2–1	Oghab Tehran

(P) Jam Abadan and Oghab Tehran Promoted to the Final round.

== Final round ==
Pos	Team	Pld	W	D	L	GF	GA	GD	Pts	Qualification
1	Persepolis (C)	14	13	0	1	45	6	+39	26	Qualification for the 1972 Asian Champion Club Tournament
2	Pas Tehran	14	12	0	2	38	6	+32	24	
3	Taj Tehran	14	9	0	5	29	13	+16	18	
4	Oghab	14	7	2	5	27	17	+10	16	
5	Sepahan	14	4	3	7	12	18	−6	11	
6	Taj Masjed Soleyman	14	3	4	7	9	26	−17	10	
7	Jam Abadan	14	2	3	9	11	31	−20	7	
8	Taj Noshahr	14	0	0	14	1	50	−49	0	

(C) Champions

== Top goalscorers ==
Safar Iranpak (left), Hossein Kalani (right) and Homayoun Behzadi (sitted)

Position	Player	Club	Goals
1	(Iran) Safar Iranpak	Persepolis	11
1	(Iran) Hossein Kalani	Persepolis	11
3	(Iran) Ali Jabbari	Taj Tehran	10
4	(Iran) Homayoun Behzadi	Persepolis	8
4	(Iran) Mohammad Sadeghi	Pas Tehran	8
4	(Iran) Gholam Vafakhah	Oghab	8
