= 1970 IFA Shield final =

- Event: 1970 IFA Shield
East Bengal	PAS Tehran
(India)	(Iran)
1	0
- Date: 25 September 1970
- Venue: Eden Gardens, Kolkata, West Bengal
- Man of the Match: Sudhir Karmakar
- Attendance: 60,000 (approx.)

The 1970 IFA Shield final was the 74th final of the IFA Shield, the second oldest football competition in India, and was contested between Kolkata giant East Bengal and Iranian giant PAS Tehran on 25 September 1970 at the Eden Gardens in Kolkata.

East Bengal won the final 1–0 to claim their 10th IFA Shield title. Parimal Dey scored in the last minute of the game.

== Route to the final ==
=== East Bengal ===
Date	Round	Opposition	Score
15 September 1970	Third Round	George Telegraph	w/o
18 September 1970	Quarter-Final	Eastern Railway	5–0
23 September 1970	Semi Final	Mohammedan Sporting	1–0 (Note: Mohammedan Sporting conceded the game.)

East Bengal entered the 1970 IFA Shield as one of the leading Kolkata giants and was supposed to start their campaign from the third round. They were supposed to face George Telegraph but they were handed a walkover and East Bengal progressed into the next round. In the quarter-finals, East Bengal defeated Eastern Railway 5–0 with Shyam Thapa scoring a brace and Samaresh Chowdhury, Syed Nayeemuddin and Mohammed Habib scoring for the team. East Bengal faced Mohammedan Sporting in the semi-finals and were leading 1–0 courtesy of a goal from Mohammed Habib, but Mohammedan Sporting walked out of the game and conceded the match. The IFA announced East Bengal as the winners of the semi-final as they reached the final.

=== PAS Tehran ===
Date	Round	Opposition	Score
16 September 1970	Third Round	Aryan	1–0
18 September 1970	Quarter-Final	BNR	5–0
22 September 1970	Semi Final	Mohun Bagan	2–0

PAS Tehran, the runners up of the 1969 Tehran Province League, the top tier of Iranian football, were invited by the IFA to participate in the 1970 IFA Shield tournament. They started their campaign in the third round, where they defeated Aryan 1–0 with Iran national team forward Asghar Sharafi scoring the only goal for the team. In the quarter-finals, PAS Tehran defeated BNR 5–0 with goals from Homayoun Shahrokhi, who scored twice while Jahangir Nassiri, Parviz Mirza-Hassan and Asghar Sharafi scored one each. In the semi-final, PAS Tehran defeated Kolkata giants Mohun Bagan 2–0 with both the goals in the second half scored by Daud Ahmadzadeh and Asghar Sharifi as they reached the final.

== Match ==
=== Details ===
25 September 1970
15:00 IST

East Bengal (India)	1–0	(Iran) PAS Tehran
Parimal Dey 90'	Report

Eden Gardens, Kolkata, West Bengal
Attendance: 60,000 (est.)
Referee: Ramakanta Ganguly (West Bengal)

East Bengal	PAS Tehran

GK	(India) Peter Thangaraj
RB	(India) Sudhir Karmakar
CB	(India) Syed Nayeemuddin
CB	(India) Prasanta Sinha
LB	(India) Santo Mitra (c)
CM	(India) Kajal Mukherjee
CM	(India) Samaresh Chowdhury	(substituted off) 70'
RF	(India) Swapan Sengupta
LF	(India) Mohammed Habib	(substituted off) 87'
ST	(India) Ashok Chatterjee
ST	(India) Shyam Thapa
Substitutes:
CM	(India) Kalon Guha	(substituted in) 70'
LF	(India) Parimal Dey	(substituted in) 87'
Coach:
(India) Mohammed Hussain

GK	(Iran) Keyvan Niknafas
RB	(Iran) Mohsen Houshangi
CB	(Iran) Hassan Habibi (c)
CB	(Iran) Majid Halvaei
LB	(Iran) Hossein Kazerani
CM	(Iran) Homayoun Shahrokhi
CM	(Iran) Mohammad Sadeghi
LF	(Iran) Mehdi Monajati	(substituted off) 69'
RF	(Iran) Jahangir Nassiri	(substituted off) 80'
ST	(Iran) Parviz Mirza-Hassan
ST	(Iran) Asghar Sharafi
Substitutes:
MF	(Iran) Daud Ahmadzadeh	(substituted in) 69'
MF	(Iran) Mohammad Ali Malkiyan	(substituted in) 80'
Coach:
(Iran) Mehdi Asadollahi

Hero of the Match:
Sudhir Karmakar (East Bengal)

Match rules

- 90 minutes.

== See also ==
- IFA Shield Finals
