= Ararat F.C. =

Ararat F.C. may refer to:

- FC Ararat Yerevan, based in Yerevan, Armenia
- F.C. Ararat Tehran, based in Tehran, Iran
- FC Ararat Moscow, amateur football club based in Moscow, Russia
