= Mehrabian =

Mehrabian is a surname. Notable people with the surname include:

- Albert Mehrabian (born 1939), American psychologist and academic
- Ali Akbar Mehrabian (born 1969), Iranian politician
- Garnik Mehrabian (1937–2022), Iranian-Armenian football player and coach
- Robert Mehrabian, Armenian-American materials scientist, corporate executive, and university president
