= Mansour Amirasefi =

Iranian footballer

Personal information
- Full name: Mansour Amirasefi
- Date of birth: 7 July 1933
- Place of birth: Tehran, Iran
- Date of death: 6 March 2010 (aged 76)
- Height: 1.75 m (5 ft 9 in)
- Position: Forward

Senior career*
Years	Team	Apps	(Gls)
1959–1964	Kian F.C.		

International career
1959–1964	Iran	15	(0)
- * Club domestic league appearances and goals

Mansour Amirasefi (Persian: منصور امیرآصفی, July 7, 1933 – March 6, 2010) was an Iranian football player and manager. He played for Kian F.C. and also captained Team Melli. He became manager of Persepolis F.C. in 1977. In a match, he didn't put Ali Parvin in the line-up, Parvin protested and then Amirasefi resigned from the club. He was also manager of F.C. Ararat Tehran. He was born in Tehran, Iran.
