= Parimal Dey =

Indian footballer (1941–2023)

Personal information
- Date of birth: 4 May 1941
- Place of birth: Bengal Presidency, British India
- Date of death: 1 February 2023 (aged 81)
- Place of death: Kolkata, West Bengal, India
- Position: Forward

Senior career*
Years	Team	Apps	(Gls)
1962–1963	Bali Prativa		
1963–1964	Wari		
1964–1971	East Bengal		
1971–1973	Mohun Bagan		
1973–1974	East Bengal		

International career
1966	India	5	(1)
- * Club domestic league appearances and goals

Parimal Dey (4 May 1941 – 1 February 2023) was an Indian footballer who played as a forward. He played for the India national team, representing the country in the 1966 Asian Games in Bangkok and the 1966 Merdeka Tournament in Malaysia. In a domestic career spanning twelve years between 1962 and 1974, he represented the big two Calcutta football clubs, East Bengal FC and Mohun Bagan FC, mostly with East Bengal and was considered one of the finest forwards of his time. Parimal Dey won the IFA Shield four times, the Durand Cup twice, and the Rovers Cup thrice while representing East Bengal.

He appeared with East Bengal from 1964 to 1970 and again in 1973 and captained the team in 1968–69. He received the lifetime achievement award from East Bengal in 2014 and the Banga Bhushan award by the Government of West Bengal in 2019. Dey died in Kolkata on 1 February 2023, at the age of 81.

== Club career ==
Parimal Dey made his club debut with Bali Prativa in the year 1962. He signed for Wari the following season and then was roped in by East Bengal in 1964. He spent seven continuous seasons with East Bengal, captaining the side in 1968. He moved to Mohun Bagan in 1971 and after spending two seasons, returned to East Bengal in 1973 before taking retirement from football.

Amongst his best experiences was a 1970 IFA Shield Final where his last-minute goal helped East Bengal defeat PAS Tehran 1–0 at the Eden Gardens. He was also the captain of the West Bengal team in the 1968 Santosh Trophy.

Dey received the lifetime achievement award from East Bengal in 2014.

== International career ==
Parimal Dey made his debut for the India national team in 1966 at the 1966 Asian Games in Bangkok. He also scored the goal against South Korea in the 1966 Merdeka Tournament bronze medal match.

== Honours ==
East Bengal

- Calcutta Football League: 1966, 1970, 1973
- IFA Shield: 1965, 1966, 1970, 1973
- Rovers Cup: 1967, 1969, 1973
- Durand Cup: 1977, 1970

Mohun Bagan

- Rovers Cup: 1971

== See also ==
- List of SC East Bengal captains

== Bibliography ==
- Kapadia, Novy (2017). Barefoot to Boots: The Many Lives of Indian Football. Penguin Random House. ISBN 978-0-143-42641-7.
- Martinez, Dolores; Mukharji, Projit B (2009). Football: From England to the World: The Many Lives of Indian Football. Routledge. ISBN 978-1-138-88353-6. Archived from the original on 2 July 2022.
- Nath, Nirmal (2011). History of Indian Football: Upto 2009–10. Readers Service. ISBN 9788187891963. Archived from the original on 22 July 2022.
- "Triumphs and Disasters: The Story of Indian Football, 1889—2000" (PDF). Archived from the original (PDF) on 13 August 2012.
- Mukhopadhay, Subir (2018). সোনায় লেখা ইতিহাসে মোহনবাগান (transl. Mohun Bagan in the history written in gold). ISBN 978-93-850172-0-9.
- Banerjee, Argha; Basu, Rupak (2022). মোহনবাগান: সবুজ ঘাসের মেরুন গল্প (transl. Mohun Bagan: Green fields' Maroon stories). Shalidhan. ISBN 978-81-954667-0-2.
- Roy, Gautam (1 January 2021). East Bengal 100. Allsport Foundation. ISBN 978-8194763109.
- Bandyopadhyay, Santipriya (1979). Cluber Naam East Bengal (in Bengali). Kolkata: New Bengal Press.
- Chattopadhyay, Hariprasad (2017). Mohun Bagan–East Bengal (in Bengali). Kolkata: Parul Prakashan.
