= Danaeifard =

Danaeifard (Persian: دانایی‌فرد) is an Iranian surname. Notable people with the surname include:

- Ali Danaeifard (1921–1979), Iranian footballer and manager
- Iraj Danaeifard (1951–2018), Iranian footballer, son of Ali
