= Seyed Mehdi Qiyassi =

Iranian football coach (born 1941)

Personal information
- Full name: Seyed Mehdi Qiyassi
- Date of birth: 1941 (age 84–85)
- Place of birth: Mashhad, Iran

Senior career*
Years	Team	Apps	(Gls)
1958–1959	Sepah Mashhad		
1959–1968	Deyhim Mashhad		
1968–1970	Arya F.C.		

Managerial career
- 1968–1970: Arya F.C.
- 1974, 1975–1992: F.C. Aboomoslem
- 1994–1995: Payam Mashhad
- * Club domestic league appearances and goals

Haj. Seyed Mehdi Qiyassi (Persian: حاج سید مهدی قیاسی; born in 1941) is an Iranian football coach and former player who is one of the most experienced football coaches from Mashhad. He first started as a swimmer before turning to Football. In 1954 with a record of 1 minute and 20 seconds, he was ranked fourth in Iran for Backstroke.

== Playing career ==
Qiyassi was born in Mashhad, Iran. He became interested in football at the age of 17, while watching the finals of a national competition between Mashhad and Esfahan where the team from his hometown won 1-0 with a goal from Khademizadeh.

At the age of 17, due to his friendship with Heshmat Mohajerani who, at the time was a footballer playing for Taj Mashhad, managed to start his football career with Sepah Mashhad which was Taj's third team. He had a speedy improvement and moved up to the second team which was called Deyhim Mashhad. During the 1960s, whilst playing for Deyhim, he reached fame and was invited to Khorasan XI.

In 1964, he was invited to the Iran national football team and spent forty days in a national team camp alongside fellow Mashhadi Ataollah Pazhand. Unfortunately both were crossed out.

== Managerial career ==
At the age of 27, he received various coaching certificates including one from Leipzig and another English FA A certificate in Tehran. He became captain and Head Coach of Arya F.C.

He has held various coaching positions (Technical Director & Head Coach) with F.C. Aboomoslem throughout the 1970s and 1980s to the present day. He was the head coach of Payam Mashhad during Azadegan League 1994–95 season.

He also coached the Khorasan Provincial Team (Khorasan XI) and Mashhad XI at a few competitions, most notably in the Qods League (provinces) and at the Turkmenistan President's Cup 2006.

== Honours ==
=== Player ===
- Iran National Tournament Champion with Khorasan XI: 1963 in Tehran victory over Tehran in final, 1964 in Tabriz, 1965 runner-up in Mashhad, 1967 in Ahvaz runner-up losing to Iran national football team in the final.

=== Manager ===
- 1975, 5th place in Takht Jamshid Cup and best non-Tehrani team award
- Head Coach of Khorasan XI from 1980–1986 particularly in Qods League (provinces)
