= 1970–71 Local League =

Local League
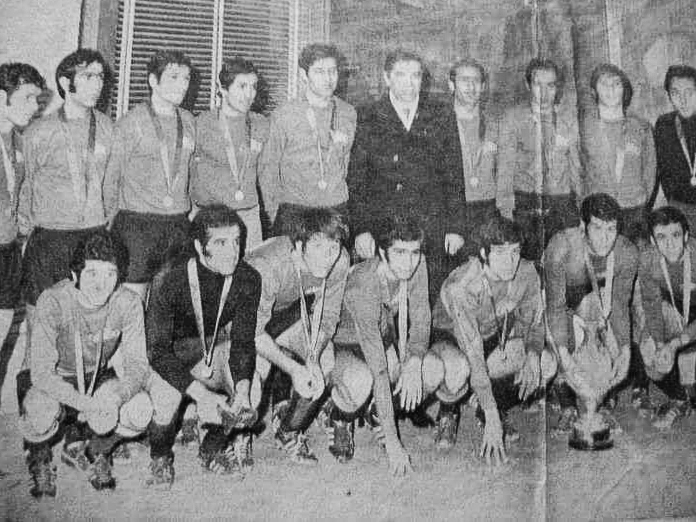
- Season: 1970–71
- Champions: Taj Tehran
- Asian Club Championship: Taj Tehran
- Matches: 15
- Goals: 40 (2.67 per match)
- Top goalscorer: Hossein Kalani (6)

The 1970–71 season was the first season of the Local League of Iranian football. The competition was won by Taj Football Club of Tehran.

== Qualifying Tournament ==
=== Region A ===
- All matches played in Kerman.

Pos	Team	Pld	W	D	L	GF	GA	GD	Pts	Qualification
1	Paykan	4	3	0	1	24	9	+15	7 (Note: 1 bonus point?)	Promoted to the Final Round
2	Taj Abadan	4	2	2	0	9	4	+5	6	Promoted to the Final Round
3	Rah Kerman	4	1	2	1	4	5	−1	4	
4	Khane Javanan Isfahan	4	1	2	1	9	14	−5	4	
5	Arash Bandar Pahlavi	4	0	0	4	6	20	−14	0	

=== Region B ===
- All matches played in Rezaeieh.

Pos	Team	Pld	W	D	L	GF	GA	GD	Pts	Qualification
1	Taj Tehran	3	3	0	0	6	1	+5	6	Promoted to the Final Round
2	Kargar Abadan	3	2	0	1	5	3	+2	4	Promoted to the Final Round
3	Persepolis Rezaiyeh	3	1	0	2	1	3	−2	2	
4	Pas Hamedan	3	0	0	3	1	6	−5	0	

=== Region C ===
- All matches played in Rasht.

==== Group A ====
Pos	Team	Pld	W	D	L	GF	GA	GD	Pts	Qualification
1	Pas Tehran	3	3	0	0	12	3	+9	6	Advance to semifinals
2	Giv Bandar Pahlavi	3	2	0	1	12	7	+5	4	Advance to semifinals
3	Taj Gonbad	3	2	0	1	8	7	+1	4	
4	Taj Rasht	3	0	0	3	4	13	−9	0	

==== Group B ====
Pos	Team	Pld	W	D	L	GF	GA	GD	Pts	Qualification
1	Arya Mashhad	2	2	0	0	3	0	+3	4	Advance to semifinals
2	Taj Khorramabad	2	1	0	1	2	1	+1	2	Advance to semifinals
3	Taj Tabriz	2	0	0	2	0	4	−4	0	

==== Semifinals ====
Pas Tehran	7–1	Taj Khorramabad

Arya Mashhad	1–1 (5–4)p	Giv Bandar Pahlavi

==== Third place play-off ====
Giv Bandar Pahlavi	8–0	Taj Khorramabad

==== Final ====
Pas Tehran	2–2 (4–3)p	Arya Mashhad

(P) Pas Tehran and Arya Mashhad Promoted to the Final Round

=== Region D ===
- All matches played in Isfahan

==== Group A ====
Pos	Team	Pld	W	D	L	GF	GA	GD	Pts	Qualification
1	Taj Ahvaz	3	3	0	0	15	2	+13	6	Advance to semifinals
2	Bargh Tehran	3	2	0	1	8	5	+3	4	Advance to semifinals
3	Pas Mashhad	3	1	0	2	5	7	−2	2	
4	Taj Kohgiluyeh	3	0	0	3	2	16	−14	0	

==== Group B ====
Pos	Team	Pld	W	D	L	GF	GA	GD	Pts	Qualification
1	Javanan Isfahan	2	1	1	0	5	2	+3	3	Advance to semifinals
2	Taj Shiraz	2	0	2	0	3	3	0	2	Advance to semifinals
3	Sahand Tabriz	2	0	1	1	1	3	−2	1	

==== Semifinals ====
Taj Shiraz	3–2	Taj Ahvaz

Javanan Isfahan	0–4	Bargh Tehran

==== Third place play-off ====
Javanan Isfahan	0–2	Taj Ahvaz

==== Final ====
Taj Shiraz	0–1	Bargh Tehran

(P) Bargh Tehran and Taj Shiraz Promoted to the Final Round.

== Final round ==
- All matches played in Amjadieh Stadium, Tehran

=== Group A ===
Pos	Team	Pld	W	D	L	GF	GA	GD	Pts	Qualification
1	Pas Tehran	3	3	0	0	9	2	+7	6	Advance to Semifinals
2	Persepolis	3	2	0	1	10	3	+7	4	Advance to Semifinals
3	Taj Shiraz	3	1	0	2	3	8	−5	2	
4	Bargh Tehran	3	0	0	3	0	9	−9	0	

=== Group B ===
Pos	Team	Pld	W	D	L	GF	GA	GD	Pts	Qualification
1	Taj Tehran	3	1	2	0	7	2	+5	4	Advance to Semifinals
2	Taj Abadan	3	1	2	0	4	2	+2	4	Advance to Semifinals
3	Kargar Abadan	3	1	2	0	5	4	+1	4	
4	Arya Mashhad	3	0	0	3	2	8	−6	0	

=== Semifinals ===
Team 1	Score	Team 2
Pas Tehran	4–2	Taj Abadan
Taj Tehran	3–0 (awd.)*	Persepolis

^{*}The match was abandoned in the 80th minute with the score at 1–1 after Persepolis walked off to protest the officiating; Taj were awarded a 3–0 victory.

=== Third-place match ===
Team 1	Score	Team 2
Taj Abadan	3–0*	Persepolis

^{*} Persepolis objected to the officials appointed for the match and refused to participate; therefore, the match was scratched and Taj Abadan were awarded a 3–0 victory.

=== Final ===
Team 1	Score	Team 2
Taj Tehran	2–1	Pas Tehran

=== Final standings ===
Pos	Team	Qualification
1	Taj Tehran	Qualification for the 1971 Asian Champion Club Tournament
2	Pas Tehran	
3	Taj Abadan	
4	Persepolis	

== Top goalscorers ==
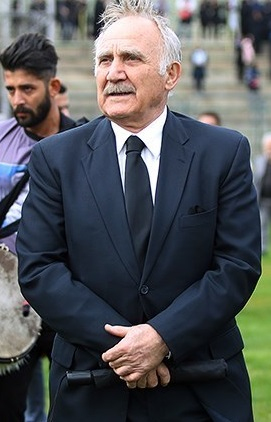
Hossein Kalani

7 goals

- (Iran) Hossein Kalani (Persepolis)
