= Taj Shiraz F.C. =

Taj Shiraz
- Full name: Taj Shiraz Football Club
- Dissolved: 1979
- Ground: Shiraz, Iran
- Owner(s): Taj Cultural and Athletic Organization
- League: Iran Regional Championship
- 1970: 6th

Taj Shiraz Football Club (In Persian language: باشگاه فوتبال تاج شیراز) was an Iranian football club based in Shiraz Iran and a branch of the Taj Cultural and Athletic Organization. The club competed in national-level competitions such as the Iran Regional Championship in the late 1960s and 1970s. It ceased operations following the 1979 Iranian Revolution.

== History ==
Taj Shiraz participated in the Iran Championship Cup and achieved notable success before the revolution.

=== Honours ===
- Iran Football Championship Cup
  - Runners-up: 1969 (1348 SH)

=== 1969–1970 Campaigns ===
In the final edition of the Iran Football Championship Cup, Taj Shiraz reached the final but lost to Paykan Tehran, finishing as national runners-up.

The club also took part in the preliminary round of the 1970 Iran Regional Cup, where it was one of the top eight teams to advance to the final round. However, it failed to qualify from its group. Taj Shiraz finished third in its group behind Pas and Persepolis but ahead of Bargh Tehran. In the overall standings, the club ranked sixth.

Following the 1979 revolution, the team’s activities were halted, along with the broader dissolution of the Taj sports organization.

== See also ==
- 1970 Iran Regional Cup
- Taj Cultural and Athletic Organization
- Sport in Shiraz
- Esteghlal Tehran Football Club
