= Vazgen Safarian =

Iranian Armenian footballer

Personal information
- Date of birth: 1954 (age 71–72)
- Place of birth: Tehran, Iran
- Position: Goalkeeper

Senior career*
Years	Team	Apps	(Gls)
–1977	Ararat Tehran		
1977–1981	Perspolis FC		
1981–1993	Ararat Tehran		

International career
1982	Iran		

Managerial career
- 1995–1996: Ararat Tehran
- * Club domestic league appearances and goals

Vazgen Safarian (Armenian: Վազգեն Սաֆարեան; Persian: وازگن صفریان; born 1954 in Tehran) is a retired Iranian Armenian football player who played for Ararat Tehran and Perspolis FC.
