= Iran Championship Cup =

Iranian football league, 1957–1968

Iran Championship Cup جام قهرمانی ایران
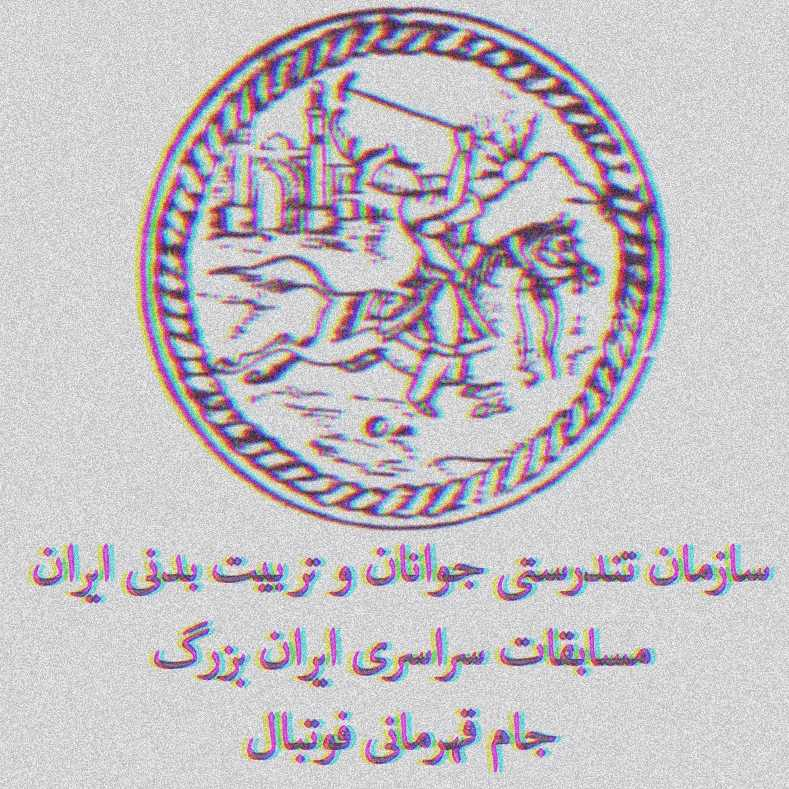
- Founded: 1957
- Folded: 1968
- Country: Iran
- Confederation: AFC
- Divisions: 1
- Level on pyramid: 1
- Last champions: Paykan
- Most championships: Pas Tehran (3 titles)

The Iran Championship Cup (Persian: جام قهرمانی فوتبال ایران) was a football tournament held in Iran between 1957 and 1968. These official football matches were held under the supervision of the Football Federation of Iran.

== Winners ==
Year	Winner (number of titles)	Runners-up	Top scorer (goals)	Host
1957	Taj (1)	AMST	(Iran) Parviz Koozehkanani (12)	Isfahan
1958	Not held			
1959	AMST (1)	Shahin Isfahan	(Iran) Aeldar Sadegzadeh	Tabriz
1960	Jam Abadan (1)	Farhang Qazvin	(Iran) Parviz Dehdari (9)	Sari
1961	Arya (1)	Kian	(Iran) Shahrokh Javanshir	Mashhad
1962	Daraei (1)	AMST	(Iran) Boiok Sabbagh	Isfahan
1963	Shahin Isfahan (1)	Tehran XI		Tehran
1964	Kian (1)	AMST	(Iran) Mohammad Ali Maalekian	Mashhad
1965	Pas Tehran (1)	Arya	(Iran) Homayoun Shahrokhi	Sari
1966	Not held			
1967	Pas Tehran (2)	AMST	(Iran) Parviz Mirzahasan	Kerman
1968	Pas Tehran (3)	Giv Bandar-e Pahlavi	(Iran) Javad Salehnia	Bandar-e Pahlavi
1969	Peykan (1)	Taj Shiraz	(Iran) Ebrahim Ashtiani (10)	Tehran

== Performances ==
Titles won by club (%)
1. Pas Tehran – 3 (27.3%)
2. Taj Tehran – 1 (9.09%)
3. Paykan Tehran – 1 (9.09%)
4. Daraei Tehran – 1 (9.09%)
5. Kian Tehran – 1 (9.09%)
6. Jam Abadan – 1 (9.09%)
7. Arya Mashhad – 1 (9.09%)
8. AMST Tabriz – 1 (9.09%)
9. Shahin Isfahan – 1 (9.09%)

=== Clubs ===
Championship Cup winners
Club	Winners	Runners-up	Season Winners
Pas Tehran	3	0	1965, 1967, 1968
AMST	1	4	1959
Kian	1	1	1964
Arya	1	1	1961
Shahin Isfahan	1	1	1963
Taj	1	0	1957
Jam Abadan	1	0	1960
Daraei	1	0	1962
Paykan	1	0	1969
Farhang Qazvin	0	1	–
Giv Bandar-e Pahlavi	0	1	–
Taj Shiraz	0	1	–

== See also ==
- Football in Iran
- Iran's Premier Football League
- Iranian football league system
- List of Iranian football champions

== Sources ==
- List at RSSSF
