= Pirouz Joghtapour =

Iranian footballer (born 1958)

Personal information
- Full name: Pirouz Joghtapour
- Date of birth: 29 April 1958 (age 68)
- Place of birth: Babol, Mazandaran, Iran
- Position: Goalkeeper

Senior career*
Years	Team	Apps	(Gls)
- Nassaji
- Bonyad Shahid
- Poora
1993–1994	Esteghlal		
1994–2000	Nassaji		

International career^{‡}
1984–1986	Iran		
- * Club domestic league appearances and goals as of 10 December 2021 ‡ National team caps and goals as of 10 December 2021

Pirouz Joghtapour (Persian: پیروز جغتاپور, born 29 April 1958) is an Iranian football goalkeeper who played for F.C. Nassaji Mazandaran, Esteghlal F.C. and the Iran national football team.
