= Reza Naalchegar =

Iranian footballer (born 1958)

Personal information
- Full name: Gholamreza Naalchegar
- Date of birth: April 19, 1958 (age 68)
- Place of birth: Iran
- Position: Forward

Senior career*
Years	Team	Apps	(Gls)
1978–1987	Taj / Esteghlal		
1987–1989	Dhaka Mohammedan		
1990–1991	Esteghlal		

International career
1977	Iran U20	1	(0)
1980	Iran	8	(1)
- * Club domestic league appearances and goals

Gholamreza Naalchegar (Persian: غلام‌رضا نعلچگر; born 19 April 1958) is a retired Iranian forward who played for the Iran national football team in 1980 AFC Asian Cup and Iran national under-20 football team in 1977 FIFA World Youth Championship. He played for Esteghlal Tehran most of his football career.
