= Qods League (provinces) =

Iranian football league

Qods League (provinces) was a nine team football competition that existed in Iran for four years from 1985 to 1988. In 1989, the league became a competition between clubs rather than provinces.

== Teams ==
The nine teams were:

- Tehran A
- Tehran B
- Esfehan
- Gilan
- Mazandaran
- Khorasan
- Fars
- East Azerbaijan
- Khuzestan

== Titles ==
=== 1985 ===
This tournament was won by Tehran A.

=== 1986 ===
This tournament was won by Esfehan.

=== 1987 ===
This tournament was won by Esfehan.

=== 1988 ===
This tournament was won by Tehran A.

== See also ==
- Qods League
