= Abbas Razavi =

Iranian football manager (born 1944)

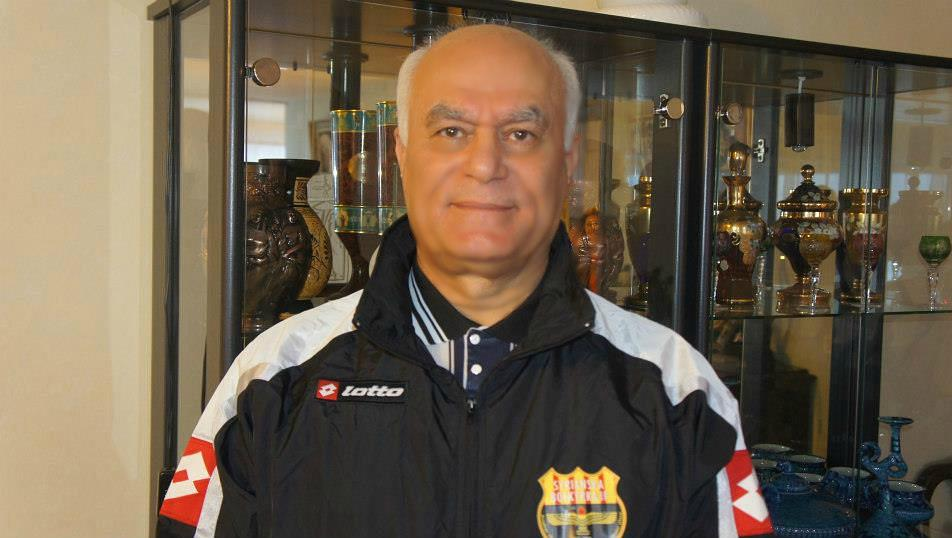

Personal information
- Full name: Abbas Razavi Kashani
- Date of birth: 22 December 1944 (age 81)
- Place of birth: Tehran, Iran

Youth career
- 1960–1964: Afsar
- 1964–1965: Eqbal

Senior career*
Years	Team	Apps	(Gls)
1965–1969	Eqbal		

Managerial career
- 1969–1970: Eqbal
- 1970–1974: Bargh Shiraz
- 1974: Aboomoslem
- 1979–1981: Esteghlal
- 1978–1979: Iran U17
- 1979–1980: Iran U20
- 1980–1981: Iran
- 1986–1987: Esteghlal
- 1990–1991: Vasas SC
- 1991–1992: Al-Shaab
- 1992–1996: Högsta tränarnivå
- 1996–1997: Högsta uppdrag
- 2001–2006: Västerhaninge IF
- 2006: Rah Ahan
- 2008: Syrianska Botkyrka IF
- * Club domestic league appearances and goals

Abbas Razavi Kashani (Persian: عباس رضوي; born 22 December 1944) is an Iranian former football manager and player. He has coaching experience in Iran, Hungary, United Arab Emirates, Sweden and Italy.

== Playing career ==
Razavi played football at youth level with Afsar F.C. which was Taj F.C.'s youth team as well as Javanan Eqbal.

At senior level he played for Eqbal F.C. and he retired aged 26.

== Managerial career ==
Razavi got his coaching license aged 26. Then he went on and coached several Iranian clubs Eqbal F.C., Bargh Shiraz F.C., F.C. Aboomoslem and Esteghlal F.C. throughout the 1960s and 1970s.

Throughout the 1980s he was involved with youth football development mainly working at U16 and U20 levels, with Iran national youth teams and Vasas SC. As assistant coach, he has worked with several famous coaches such as Rudolf Illovszky, Kálmán Mészöly, Heshmat Mohajerani.

As head coach throughout the 1990s and later, he coached several clubs in Swedish First and Second Division and had a short spell with Rahahan F.C. back in 2006.

== Achievements ==
- Champion: Tehran Hazfi Cup with Esteghlal F.C.
- Champion: Hungarian League with Vasas SC
- Champion: Swedish Second Division
