= Garnik Mehrabian =

Iranian Armenian footballer and coach (1937–2022)

Personal information
- Date of birth: September 1937
- Place of birth: Tehran, Iran
- Date of death: 2 June 2022 (aged 84)
- Place of death: Glendale, California, U.S
- Position: Midfielder

Senior career*
Years	Team	Apps	(Gls)
1954–1963	Taj		

International career
- Iran

Managerial career
- 1963–1973: Ararat Tehran
- 1973–1978: Iran U20
- 1975–1978: Iran (assistant)
- 1978–1980: Machine Sazi
- 1980–1982: United Arab Emirates (assistant)
- 1982–1983: Ras Al-Khaima Club
- 1982–1983: Dibba Al-Hisn
- * Club domestic league appearances and goals

Garnik Mehrabian (September 1937 – 5 June 2022) was an Iranian Armenian football player and coach.

== Managerial career ==
After retiring from professional football, Mehrabian received a coaching position from Iranian Armenian club Ararat Tehran F.C. His success at the club earned Mehrabian the opportunity to coach both the Iran U20 and Iran senior national teams.

Upon being released from his duties in 1978, Mehrabian began a short stint with Machine Sazi in Tabriz. This opportunity revitalized his coaching career, bringing him to the attention of the United Arab Emirates Football Association, becoming the coach of the nation's team in 1980.

Mehrabian later resided in Glendale, California, where he was the director of his own soccer academy and was the coach of amateur side Pyunik Los Angeles.

== External sources ==
- Official Site
