= Jam Abadan F.C. =

Jam Abadan
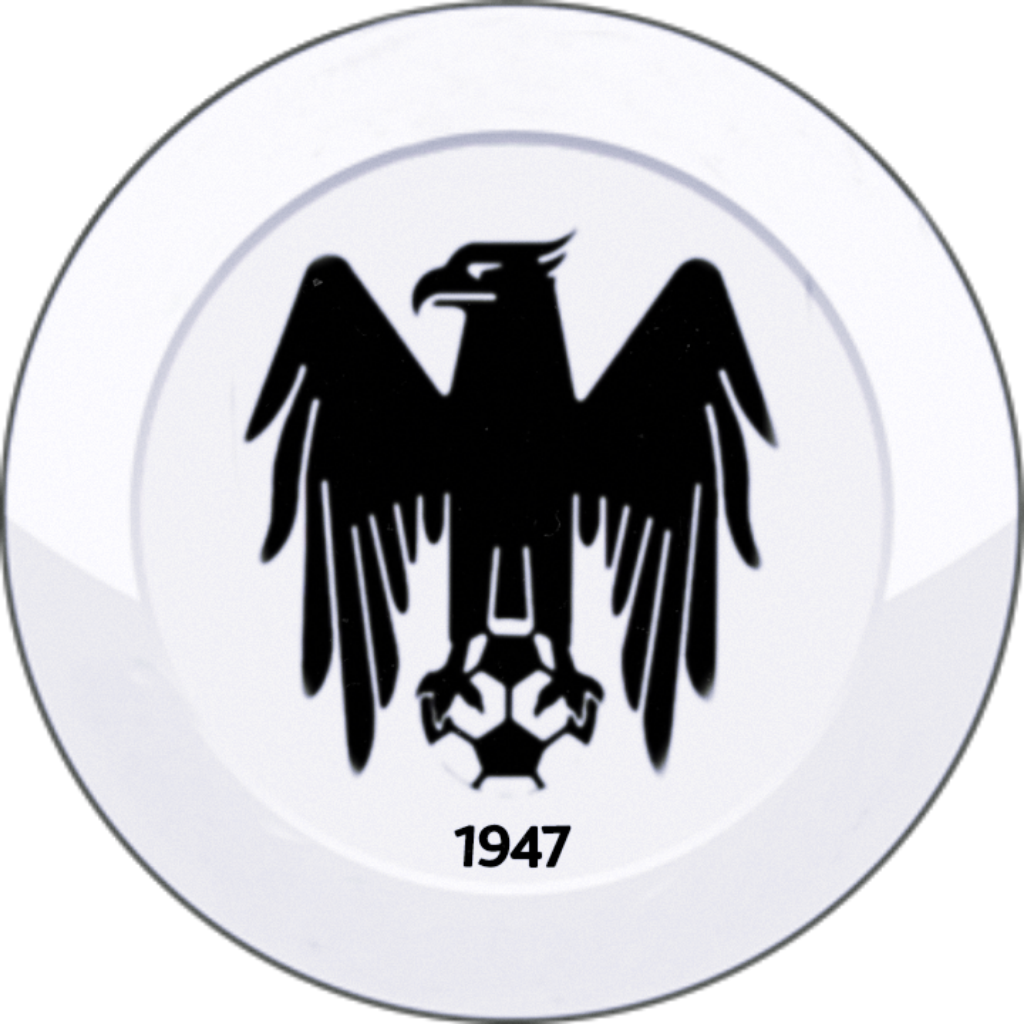
- Full name: Jam Abadan F.C.
- Founded: 1945
- Dissolved: 1979
- Stadium: Takhti Stadium (Abadan)
- Capacity: 20,000
Home colours

Jam Abadan (Persian: جم آبادان), also known as Shahin Abadan (Persian: شاهین آبادان), was one of the oldest Iranian football clubs based in Abadan, Iran. They are known as one of the first champions of the Iranian Football League. Iranian famous football player Parviz Dehdari had a history of playing in the team. The club was in third place in the 1957 Iran Football Championship Cup and won the 1960 Iran Football Championship Cup which was their first national cup.

== Honours ==
Iran Football Championship Cup:

- Winners (1): 1964

قهرمان (۱): ۱۳۳۹
