= Parviz Dehdari =

Iranian footballer and coach (1935–1992)

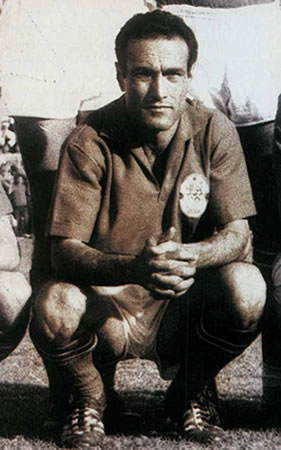

Personal information
- Full name: Parviz Dehdari
- Date of birth: March 21, 1935
- Place of birth: Marvdasht, Iran
- Date of death: November 23, 1992 (aged 57)
- Place of death: Tehran, Iran
- Position: Midfielder

Senior career*
Years	Team	Apps	(Gls)
1953–1957	Shahin Abadan		
1957–1960	Jam Abadan		
1960–1966	Shahin Tehran		

International career
1955–1965	Iran	10	(4)

Managerial career
- 1968–1969: Persepolis
- 1969–1971: Homa
- 1971–1972: Iran
- 1976–1986: Naft Tehran
- 1986–1989: Iran
Medal record
Men's football
Representing Iran (as manager)
AFC Asian Cup
Bronze medal – third place	1988
- * Club domestic league appearances and goals

Parviz Dehdari (Persian: پرویز دهداری; March 21, 1935 – November 23, 1992) was an Iranian football player and coach.

== Early life ==
He was born on 21 March 1935 in Marvdasht from an Abadani family. His family moved back to Abadan after his birth. He grew up in Abadan and began playing football in 1946.

== Playing career ==
He initially to Jam Abadan in 1953. His good techniques in Jam and after winning the Local Cup in 1955, he was invited to Team Melli and made his debut in match against Soviet Union in November 1955. He played for Jam Abadan, Shahin Tehran and has served most of his career in Abadan. He was captain of Jam Abadan in 1960 and win the first championship in IRN championship cup.

== Coaching career ==
He was in Shahin until the club's dissolution in 1966. Then he signed a contract with Persepolis F.C. and became head coach of club. He was the first manager of Persepolis and caused that Shahin F.C. players move to Persepolis. He became head coach of Homa F.C. in 1969 after leaves Persepolis. He won Takhte Jamshid Cup for two times with Homa. After his good results in Homa, he was appointed as Head coach of National football team in 1971. He coached team in Olympic Games in Munich, the team was able to successfully deliver the Olympic competition. But resigned before the tournament. He resigned because of differences he had with his assistant, Mohammad Ranjbar. He was re-appointed as head coach of national team in 1986. He led team melli in 1986 Asian Games and 1988 AFC Asian Cup. Team Melli became third place in 1988 Asian Cup and Dehdari was sacked by Islamic Republic of Iran Football Federation on 22 January 1989.

== Personal life ==
=== Death ===
He died on November 23, 1992, as a result of kidney disease at his home. Each year a ceremony is held in Abadan in his honor. Today, he is called the Comportment schema. A street behind Takhti Stadium has been named after Parviz Dehdari.
