= Ali Danaeifard =

Iranian footballer (1921–1979)

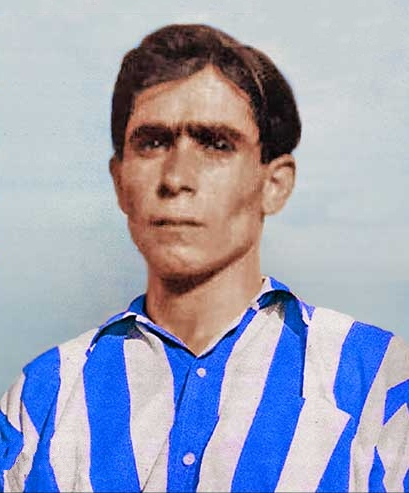

Personal information
- Full name: Ali Danaeifard
- Date of birth: 2 October 1921
- Place of birth: Tehran, Qajar Iran
- Date of death: 5 November 1979 (aged 58)
- Place of death: Tehran, Iran
- Position: Midfielder

Senior career*
Years	Team	Apps	(Gls)
1945 – 1950	Taj		

Managerial career
- 1946–1969: Taj
- 1970–1973: Taj Women
- * Club domestic league appearances and goals

Ali Danaeifard (Persian: علی دانایی‌فرد, 2 October 1921 – 5 November 1979) was an Iranian football player. He was first head coach of Esteghlal Tehran. Many people call him Father of Esteghlal. His son Iraj Danaeifard also became a professional football player. His daughter Mitra Danaeifard also became both a professional player and coach of Esteghlal Tehran carrying on the family legacy at the club.
