= Hassan Habibi (footballer) =

Iranian football player and manager (1940–2026)

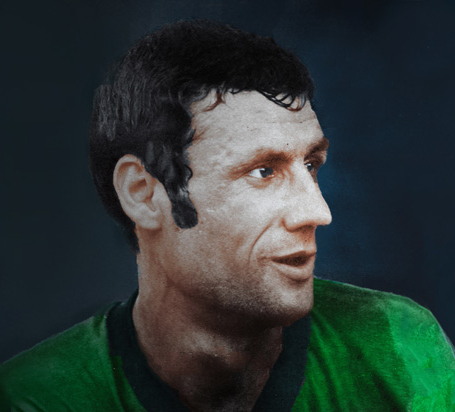

Personal information
- Full name: Hassan Habibi Nakhmaghlai
- Date of birth: 8 February 1940
- Place of birth: Kerman, Iran
- Date of death: 2 November 2026 (aged 86)
- Place of death: Tehran, Iran
- Height: 1.70 m (5 ft 7 in)
- Position: Defender

Senior career*
Years	Team	Apps	(Gls)
1958–1960	Shahin		
1960–1964	Taj		
1964–1972	PAS Tehran		

International career
1958–1970	Iran	31	(0)

Managerial career
- 1972–1978: PAS Tehran
- 1979–1980: Iran
- 1982–1992: Ararat
- 1991–1994: Iran Olympic
Medal record
Men's football
Representing Iran (as manager)
AFC Asian Cup
Bronze medal – third place	1980
- * Club domestic league appearances and goals

Hassan Habibi (Persian: حسن حبیبی; 8 February 1940 – 2 November 2026) was an Iranian football player and manager.

== Playing career ==
Habibi was born in Kerman on 8 February 1940. At the age of four his family moved to Tehran, where his father found a job as a clerk for the Ministry of Health. He started his football career with Shahin and was selected to play for the national team in 1958. In 1960, he joined Taj where he played for a few seasons. In 1964, he joined PAS Tehran and played there until 1971, when he retired. He was the captain of the national teams that competed at the 1964 Summer Olympic Games, and won the silver medal at the 1966 Asian Games and the gold medal at the 1968 Asian Cup.

== Coaching career ==
After retiring from competitions Habibi coached PAS Tehran. In 1979, he joined the Iran national team, which then qualified for the 1980 Summer Olympics. However the Iran Football Federation boycotted the event due to occupation of Afghanistan by the Soviet Union. He then guided the national team to a bronze medal at the 1980 Asian Cup. He left from his position after the resignation of Nasser Noamooz, who was the Iranian Football Federation's General Secretary.

Then Habibi coached Ararat and help the club revive in the Tehran Provincial League and promote to Azadegan league. He returned to national team coaching 11 years later, this time managing the Iran under-23 national team for qualification for the 1992 Summer Olympics. He introduced many talented players to Iran national teams such as Karim Bagheri, Mehrdad Minavand, Khodadad Azizi, Mehdi Mahdavikia, Yahya Golmohammadi, Reza Shahroudi, Afshin Peyrovani, Nima Nakisa and Javad Manafi.

== Death ==
Habibi died on 2 November 2026, at the age of 86.

== Achievements ==
- Participation in 1964 Summer Olympic Games as a player
- Qualification at 1980 Summer Olympic Games as Manager of Iran national football team
- Third Place at 1980 Asian Cup as Manager of Iran national football team

Sporting positions
Preceded by Mohammad Ranjbar	Iran national football team captain 1967–1970	Succeeded by Mostafa Arab
