= Poora F.C. =

Iranian football club

Poora
- Full name: Poora Tehran Football Club
- Founded: 1989
- Chairman: Abdollah Soufiyani
Home colours	Away colours

Poora Tehran Football Club (Persian: پورا تهران) was an Iranian football club based in Tehran, Iran.

== History ==
Abdollah Soufiyani purchased the football club Kian F.C. and renamed it Poora. The club started operations in 1989.

== Managers ==
- (Iran) Ebrahim Ashtiani
- (Iran) Fereydoun Mobini
- (Iran) Ahmad Khodadad
- (Iran) Mansour Pourheidari
- (Iran) Parviz Mazloomi
