= F.C. Ararat Tehran =

Iranian football club

Ararat
- Full name: Football Club Ararat Tehran
- Founded: 1944; 73 years ago
- Ground: Ararat Stadium; Tehran; Iran
- Capacity: 15,000
- Owner: Ararat Cultural Organization
- Chairman: Khachik Babayans
- Manager: Mehdi Dinvarzadeh
- League: Tehran Province League
- 2019: Tehran Provincial League, 5th
- Website: http://www.araratfc.com
Home colours	Away colours

FC Ararat (Persian: آرارات تهران, Ârarat Tehran) is an Armenian diaspora football team based in Tehran, Iran who play in the Tehran Province League. Ararat football club is the football club of the multisport Ararat Club in Iran.

Ararat has a policy of signing only players who have an Armenian heritage.

== Club history ==
=== Establishment ===
The club was established in 1944 by a group of Armenian-Iranians. They named the club after the famous mountain of the same name. The club was run by an Armenian athletic organization and was one of few clubs in Iranian football to have its own private stadium and training facilities. The club has never had spectacular results, but has always provided talented players for Iranian football. It was heavily supported by the Armenian minority in Iran.

=== Drop to the lower leagues ===
The last time the club played in the top level of Iranian football was the 1995–96 season of the Azadegan League (current IPL). Due to the poor decisions of the club management, Ararat FC has spent most of the past few years playing in the 1st Division and 2nd Division of Iran's football leagues. Until recently the club had a policy of only employing Armenian staff and players, but with the team's poor form in the past few years, this decision has been overturned and non-Armenians have coached the team. The players though are all Armenian-Iranians. In the 2005–06 season the club came very close to promotion into the Azadegan League, but fell short in the last few weeks of the season.

In 2007–08 season they took the last place in their group and relegated to 3rd division but in July 2008, Iran Football Federation increased number of 2nd Division teams to 28 and Ararat still remained in 2nd Division.

A major changes heralded for Ararat in 2008, as the terrible state of the club's finances was revealed, they were unable to pay wages and had major debts. The club's owner, Armenian-Iranians, were able to raise some more money, but even this soon proved to be insufficient resources to sustain the club. They finished last in the 2nd Division (group A) standings of the 2008–09 season. Thus, being relegated to 3rd Division. After the club's relegation, Arrarat was dissolved by its owners.

=== Refounding ===
Arrarat was reopened on 9 October 2014 after a five years of absence. They also played a friendly match at the same day with Esteghlal XI. The club was placed in the Tehran Provincial League Division 1 and lost their first match 2–1. In 2015 the club was promoted to the Tehran Provincial League.

== Season-by-season ==
The table below chronicles the achievements of Ararat in various competitions since 1965.

Season	League									Hazfi Cup	Notes	Leagues Top goalscorer		Manager
Season	Division	P	W	D	L	F	A	Pts	Pos	Hazfi Cup	Notes	Name	Goals	Manager
1965–66	TFL	12	3	2	7	14	28	8	9th					Mansour Amirasefi
1966–67	TFL	11	4	3	4	13	8	12	7th					Mansour Amirasefi
1967–68	TFL													Mansour Amirasefi
1968–69	TFL													Mansour Amirasefi
1969–70	TFL	15	8	1	6	18	22	17	5th					Garnik Mehrabian
1970–71	TFL													Garnik Mehrabian
1971–72	TFL	14	8	0	6	18	18	16	6th					Garnik Mehrabian
1972–73	TFL	15	3	6	6	10	14	12	11th					Garnik Mehrabian
1973–74	TFL	11	5	5	1	11	5	15	3rd					Garnik Mehrabian
1974–75	TFL	13	8	2	3	17	9	18	2nd		Promoted to the Takht Jamshid Cup			Mansour Amirasefi
1975–76	TJC	30	8	10	12	23	31	26	12th					Mansour Amirasefi
1976–77	TJC	30	6	13	11	23	32	25	12th		Relegated to the Iran Football's 2nd Division			Mansour Amirasefi /Thomas Certish
1977–78	Div 2	22	9	10	13	21	9	28	3rd	Not held				Hamlet Asefi
1978–79	Div 2	Not Completed Due to Iranian Revolution								Not held				
1979-8	SEC									Not held				Arshavil Maleki
1981–82	TFL	13	3	8	2	10	8	14	7th	Not held				Arshavil Maleki
1982–83	TFL	17	4	8	5	13	20	16	12th	Not held				Mansour Amirasefi
1983–84	TFL	17	5	8	4	19	12	18	6th	Not held				Mansour Amirasefi
1984–85	TFL	Did not finish								Not held				Mansour Amirasefi
1985–86	TFL	9	1	3	5	7	13	5	10th	Not held	Relegated to the Iran Football's 2nd Division			Mansour Amirasefi
1986–87	TFL2	10	4	2	4	12	9	10	5th					Hassan Habibi
1987–88	TFL2	17	4	9	4	13	12	17	9th					Hassan Habibi
1988–89	TFL2	17	9	6	2	18	7	33	3rd					Hassan Habibi
1989–90	TFL2	14	9	5	0	30	8	23	2nd	Not held	Promoted to the Tehran Province leagu			Hassan Habibi
1990–91	TFL	17	6	6	5	11	10	18	7th					Hassan Habibi
1991–92	TFL	15	6	6	3	11	8	18	5th					Hassan Habibi
1992–93	TFL	26	8	10	8	22	20	26	7th	Not held				Hassan Habibi
1993–94	TFL	18	12	4	2	28	13	28	2nd		Promoted to the Azadegan League			Hassan Habibi
1994–95	Div 1	22	8	9	5	31	19	25	5th					Hassan Habibi
1995–96	Div 1	30	8	7	15	27	39	31	12th		Relegated to the Iran Football's 2nd Division			Vazgen Safarian
1996–97	Div 2	30	8	9	13	32	42	33	14th					
1997–98	Div 2	18	6	9	3	18	14	27	4th	Not held				
1998–99	Div 2	16	6	4	6	25	17	22	6th					
1999-00	Div 2	16	7	2	7	23	25	23	5th					
2000–01	Div 2	16	2	2	12	16	34	8	9th					
2001–02	Div 1	20	5	7	8	12	18	22	9th		Relegated to the Iran Football's 2nd Division			
2002–03	Div 2	10	2	5	3	11	10	11	4th					
2003–04	Div 2	22	6	6	10	22	24	24	9th					
2004–05	Div 2	18	10	5	3	25	11	35	2nd					
2005–06	Div 2	22	11	5	6	31	24	38	3rd					
2006–07	Div 2	26	11	5	10	32	37	38	7th					
2007–08	Div 2	26	4	2	20	16	51	14	14th					
2008–09	Div 2	0	0	0	0	0	0	0	9th		Relegated to the Iran Football's 3rd Division			
2009–10	Div 3	0	0	0	0	0	0	0	12th		Relegated to the Tehran Province league			
2010–11	TPL	Absence									Relegated to the Tehran Province league Div 1			
2011–12	TPL.Div 1	Absence												
2012–13	TPL.Div 1	Absence												
2013–14	TPL.Div 1	Absence												
2014–15	TPL.Div 1	10	8	1	1	22	5	25	1st	Did not qualify				
2016–17	TPL.Div 1	26	14	7	5	52	38	49	5th					

=== Key ===
- P = Played
- W = Games won
- D = Games drawn
- L = Games lost
- F = Goals for
- A = Goals against
- Pts = Points
- Pos = Final position
- TJC = Takht Jamshid Cup
- TFL = Tehran Football League
- SEC = Shahid Espandi Cup
- TFL2 = Tehran Football League's 2nd Div.
- Div 1 = Azadegan League
- Div 2 = 2nd Division
- Div 3 = 3rd Division
- TPL = Tehran Province league
- TPL.Div 1 = Tehran Province league's 1st Div.

Champions	Runners-up

== Current Management Team ==
Position	Name
Head coach	(Iran) Mehdi Dinvarzadeh
Assistant coach	(Iran) Robert Margosi
Assistant coach	(Iran) Vazgen Safarian
Technical manager	(Iran) Mais Minasian
Team Manager	(Iran) Vazgen Safarian

== Head coaches ==
- (Iran) Garnik Mehrabian (1963–1973)
- (Iran) Mansour Amirasefi (c.1980s)
- (Iran) Hassan Habibi (c.1980s)
- (Iran) Mehdi Dinvarzade (c.2015s)
