= Kian F.C. =

Iranian football club

Kian
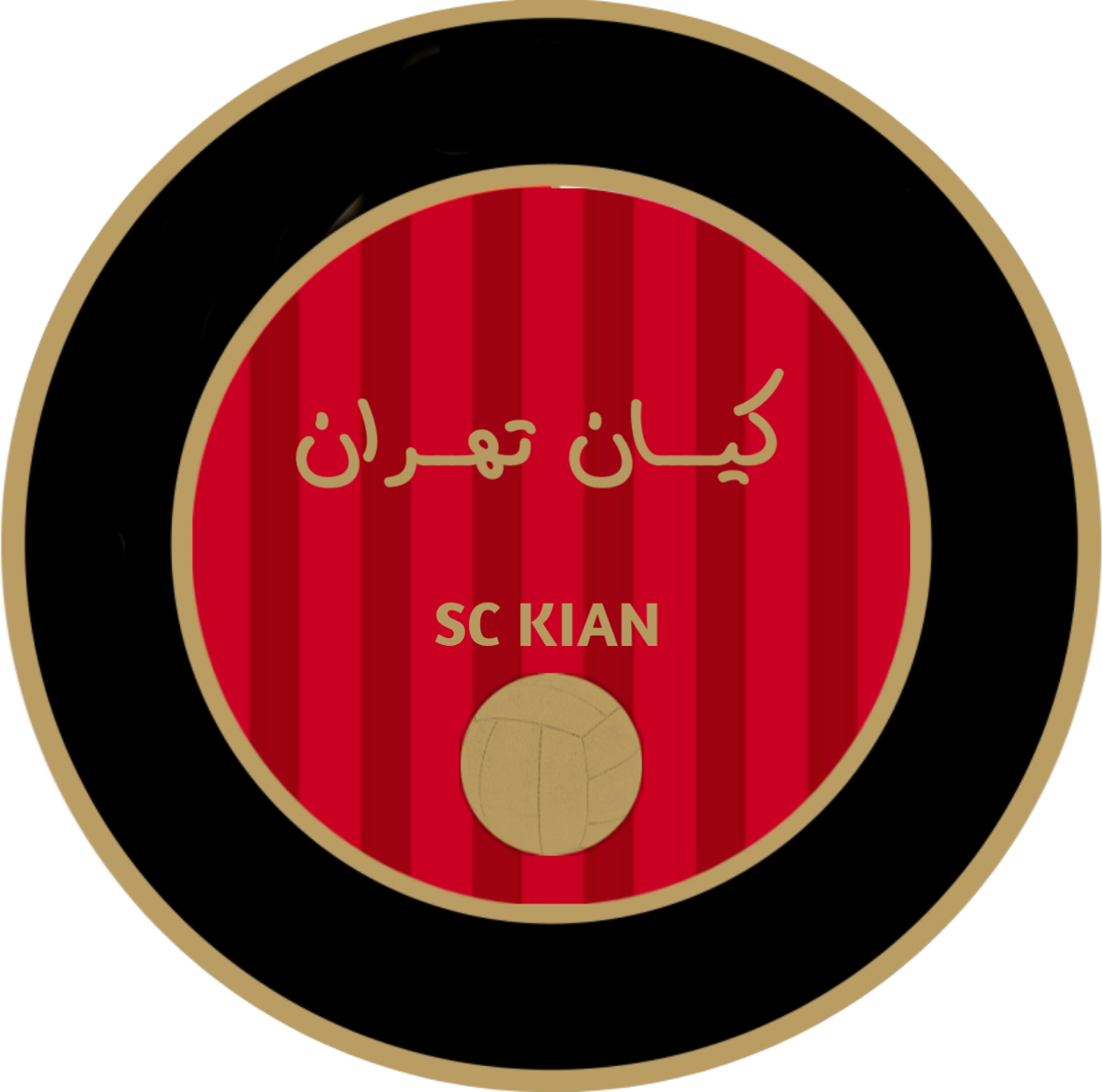
- Full name: Kian Tehran Football Club
- Dissolved: 1989
- Chairman: Sadri Miretemadi
Home colours	Away colours

Kian Tehran Football Club (Persian: کیان تهران) was an Iranian football club based in Tehran, Iran. It was founded by Sadri Miretemadi and established in the 1950s. In 1989, it was purchased by Abdollah Soufiyani and became known as Poora F.C.

== Honours ==
Iran Championship Cup:

- Winners (1): 1964

Tehran hazfi cup:

- Winners (1): 1986
