= Mohammad Ranjbar =

Iranian footballer (1935–2004)

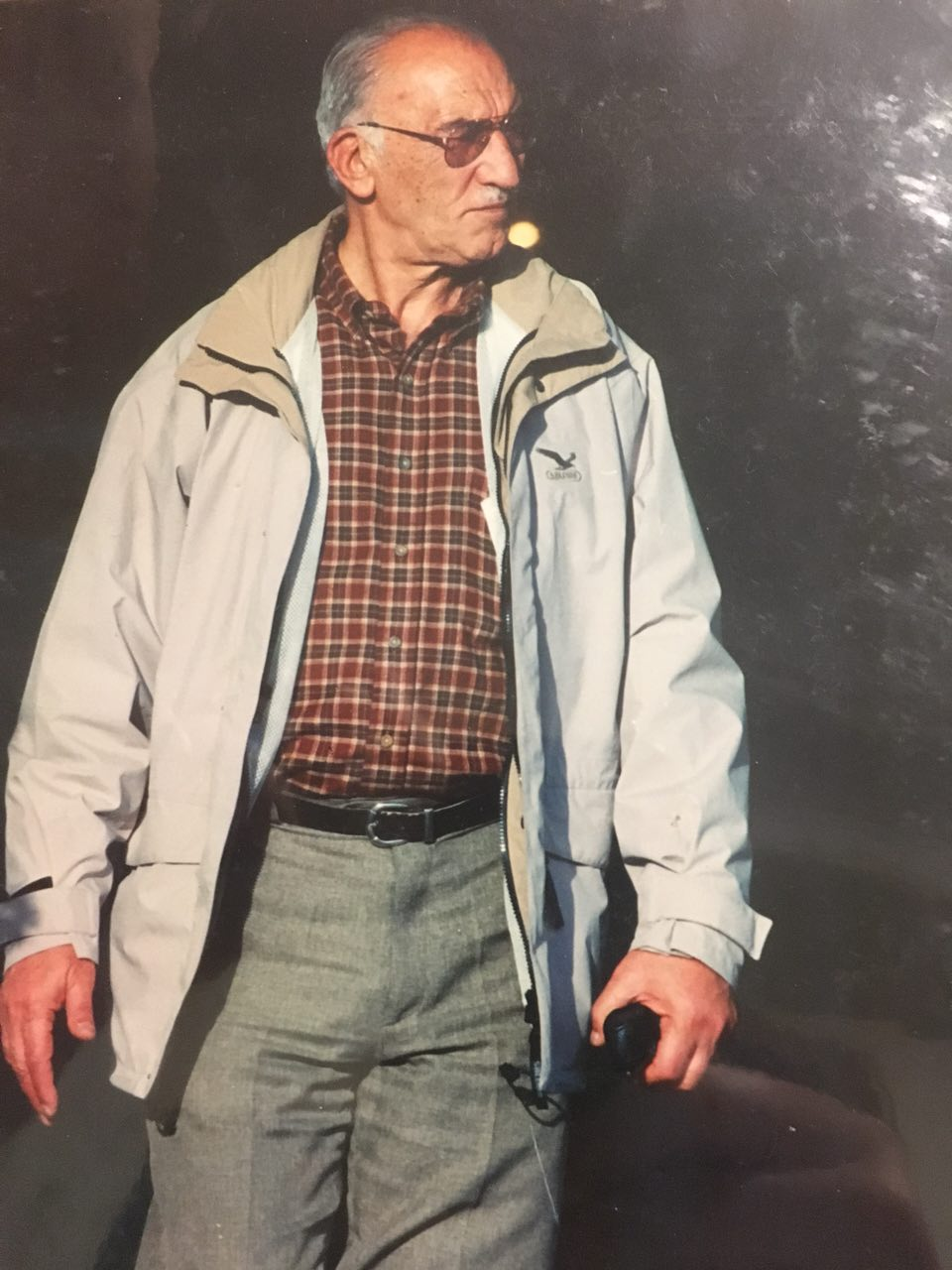

Personal information
- Full name: Mohammad Ranjbar (Persian: محمد رنجبر)
- Date of birth: 1 January 1935
- Place of birth: Kermanshah, Iran
- Date of death: 29 June 2004 (aged 69)
- Place of death: Tehran, Iran
- Position: Defender

Youth career
- 1950–1956: Shahin Kermanshah

Senior career*
Years	Team	Apps	(Gls)
1956–1964	Taj Tehran		
1964–1970	Pas Tehran		

International career
1959–1967	Iran	23	(0)

Managerial career
- 1968–1970: Iran U20
- 1970–1972: Iran (assistant)
- 1972: Iran
- * Club domestic league appearances and goals

Mohammad Ranjbar (Persian: محمد رنجبر; 1 January 1935 – 29 June 2004) was an Iranian footballer and coach. Ranjbar played for Taj Tehran and Pas Tehran. He was a member and captain of Iran national team. He was also head coach of national team in 1972.

== Early years ==
Ranjbar was born on 1 January 1935 in Kermanshah, Iran and lived in Kermanshah until end of his high school career. He was joined to the Shahin Kermanshah in 1950. After end of his studying and was moved to Tehran and graduated from Daneshkadeh Afsari.

== Club career ==
Ranjbar joined Taj club in 1956 but left the club to move to PAS Tehran in 1964. He was captain of PAS from 1965 to 1970 when he retired from playing football.

== International career ==
Ranjbar was a member of Iran national military team. In 1959 at the age of 25, Ranjbar was invited to the senior team and was a part of the team in the 1960 AFC Asian Cup. After Parviz Dehdari's retirement in 1965, he was captain of the national team for two years. He was retired in 1967 after match against Turkey.

== Coaching career ==
After his retirement from playing football, Ranjbar began his coaching career as manager of Iran national under-20 football team in 1968. He was selected as assistant coach of the national football team in 1970 and was again selected as this position in 1971 by Parviz Dehdari. After Dehdari's resignation in 1972, Ranjbar was appointed as caretaker manager of the national team which he led to the final victory in 1972 AFC Asian Cup. After team's success with Ranjbar, Iran Football Federation appointed Ranjbar as team's head coach and signed a two years contract with him but he was resigned after two months. He was out of football from 1972 to 1985. In 1985, he was appointed as technical manager of Esteghlal. Ranjbar was team manager of the national team in from 1998 to 2002.

== Illness and death ==
On 12 January 2004, 69-year-old Ranjbar suffering from his fatal disease for several months was dispatched to Hanover, Germany to undergo a surgery but the German doctors preferred not to operate due to his critical conditions. He died on 29 June 2004 and succumbed to his cerebral disorder in Iranmehr hospital, north of Tehran.

== Honours ==
=== Player ===
Taj Tehran

- Tehran Province League: 1956–1957, 1957–1958, 1959–1960, 1960–61, 1962–63
- Tehran Hazfi Cup: 1958–1959

Pas Tehran

- Tehran Province League: 1966–67

Iran

- RCD Cup: 1965
- Asian Games silver medal: 1966

=== Manager ===
Iran

- AFC Asian Cup: 1972
