= Arya F.C. =

Aria Mashhad
- Full name: Aria Mashhad
- Nickname(s): Sanabad khorasan
- Founded: 1960
Home colours	Away colours

Aria Mashhad (Persian: آریا مشهد) was an Iranian football club based in Mashhad, Iran. It was the main football club representing Khorasan throughout the 1960s. The club participated in Iran Football League in 1970 where it reached the second round that involved the last 8 teams divided in two groups. Unfortunately the team came last in its group. Due to poor performances during qualifications for Takht Jamshid Cup, the club dissolved and players moved to newly established F.C. Aboomoslem.

== Honours ==
- Reached second round (last 8) Iran Football League in 1970

== Managers ==
- (Iran) Seyed Mehdi Qiyassi 1968–1970
