= Homayoun Shahrokhi =

Iranian footballer and manager

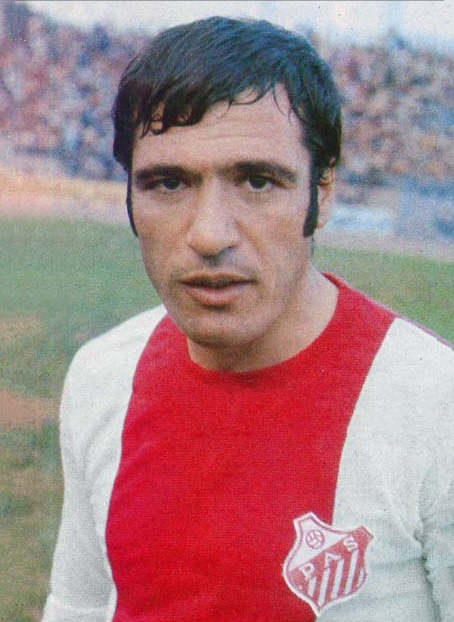

Personal information
- Full name: Homayoun Shahrokhi
- Date of birth: 2 March 1946 (age 80)
- Place of birth: Tehran, Iran
- Position: Midfielder

Senior career*
Years	Team	Apps	(Gls)
1964–1978	PAS Tehran		

Managerial career
- 1978–1980: PAS Tehran
- 1979–1982: Iran (assistant)
- 1996–1997: Foolad
- 1997–1998: Oman
- 2001–2003: PAS Tehran
- 2003–2004: Paykan
- 2003: Iran (caretaker)
- 2006–2007: PAS Tehran
- * Club domestic league appearances and goals as of 15:43, 4 January 2011 (UTC) ‡ National team caps and goals as of 15:43, 4 January 2011 (UTC)

Homayoun Shahrokhi (Persian: همایون شاهرخی; born 2 March 1946) is an Iranian football coach and former player.

He is known mostly for playing for PAS Tehran F.C., he was captain of the team winning the Takht Jamshid Cup twice (1976/77 ad 1977/78). Later on he managed PAS Tehran F.C. for several years. He was also head coach of Iran national football team for a short period, from February till September 2003. He was also technical manager of Iran national football team from 2004 until 2006.
