= Football in Iran =

- Country: Iran
- Governing body: FFIRI
- National team: Iran
- First played: 1941; 85 years ago
- Registered players: 449,644

National competitions
- FIFA Women's World Cup; FIFA World Cup; AFC Women's Asian Cup; Asian Cup

Club competitions
- List: League: Women's Competition Kowsar Women Football League Women's 2nd Division Men's Competition Persian Gulf Pro League Azadegan League 2nd Division 3rd Division Provincial Leagues; Cups: Women's Competition Women's Hazfi Cup Women's Super Cup Men's Competition Hazfi Cup Iranian Super Cup

International competitions
- FIFA Women's Club World Cup; FIFA Club World Cup; AFC Women's Club Championship; AFC Champions League

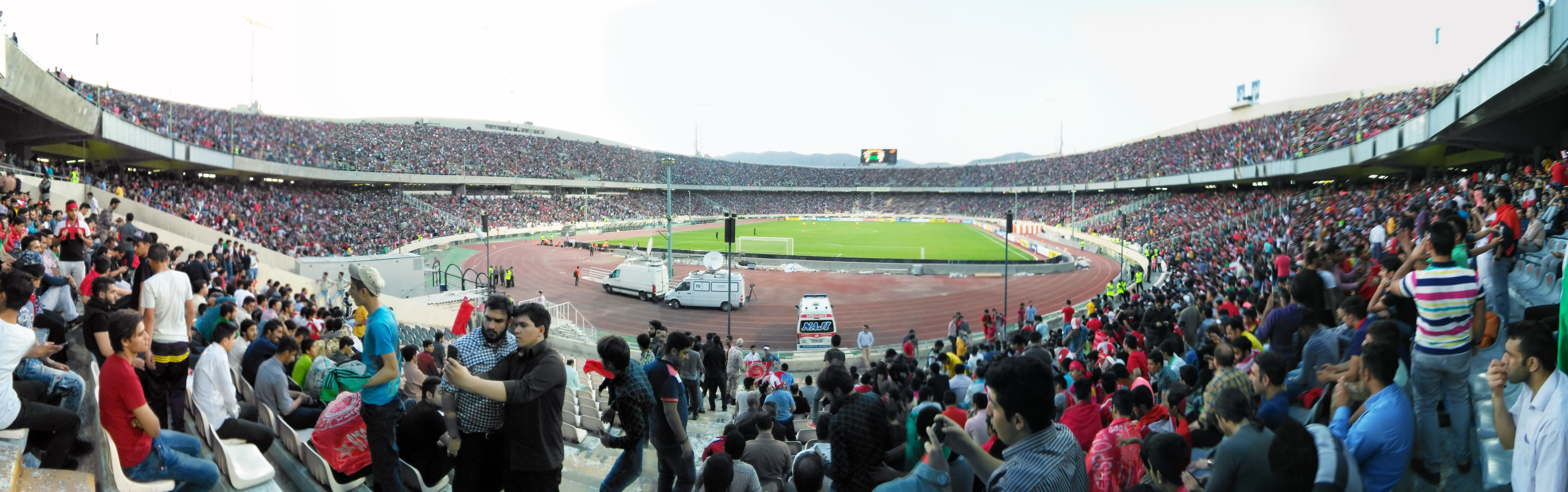
Azadi Football Stadium is the biggest venue for Iranian football. It is also the world's 3rd largest soccer stadium.

Football is the most popular sport in Iran, with wrestling and volleyball as close contenders. Football has been a part of life for Iranians for many decades now and is played in schools, streets, and football clubs nationwide.

For political and social reasons, women's football grew little from the 1980s to 2020, and clubs such as Persepolis and Esteghlal did not even have a women's football team in these years.

== History ==
=== Early days ===
Football was played in Iran as early as 1898, when a team of British residents of Esfahan played a team of Armenians. In south western Iran the game was introduced in 1907 by British sailors and workers. At that time they were working at port cities Bushehr, Khorramshahr, Bandar Abbas and major oil refineries such as Abadan and Masjed Soleiman in the province of Khuzestan, the latter area even boasting a football league. The local Iranian employees of the company first looked on, and then began replacing individual players on the teams, until they formed their own teams.

In 1907, the British Ambassador in Tehran Cecil Spring Rice founded Iran's first Football Tournament which had only 3 teams: Embassy of Great Britain, Imperial Bank of Persia and Indo-European Telegraph Company.

In the same year, the Tehran Football Association Club, an organising body for arranging football matches, was established. All teams were made up of British residents of Tehran, although when teams didn't have enough players they sometimes chose Iranian bystanders to come on the field and play. The matches were played at or around Mashq Square. The first Iranian player was Karim Zandi who played from 1908 to 1916. This period saw increasing interest in the game among Iranians.

In 1910, Samuel M. Jordan, the principal of the American School (currently known as Alborz High School) in Tehran, introduced football as part of the school's curriculum. Four years later 1914, the start of World War I put an end to these football matches and programs.

In other parts of southern Iran, (e.g. cities such as Shiraz) football was introduced by the British officers of the South Persia Rifles (1916–1921) to the Iranian troops they commanded, who then spread the game among the civilian population. The period following World War 1 saw football matches recommence in Tehran. Then two years later, in 1920, a number of Iranian and British football enthusiasts founded the Iranian Football Association (Majmaa-i Football-i Iran) to encourage Iranian players and to popularize the game. The director of the Imperial Bank of Persia, James McMurray, became its president, and he was assisted by the legation doctor, A.R. Neligan; they each donated a cup to be awarded to winning teams.

1920 also saw the establishment of Iran's first football club called Iran Club. Soon after the alumni of American College and the students of School of Political Science also formed teams. The Iran Club squad consisted of Karim Zandi, Khan Sardar brothers, Amir-Aslani brothers, Mohammad Ali Shokooh, Azizollah Afkkhami, Reza Kalantar, Sheybani, Hasan Meftah, Herand, Galustyan, Khajeh-Noori, Reza Rabizadeh, Hambarson, Ashrafi. This group of players won the Tehran Association Cup in 1923. In the same year a new club was established called Tehran Club, followed by the creation of the Armenian Sports Club and the Toofan Club, and in 1925 the Tehran Club reached the final and defeated the British Select Team of Tehran 2–1.

In this period a number of footballers who had played abroad, such as Hossein Sadaghiani and the Khan-Sardar brothers, who played in the Belgian Football Leagues, returned to Iran. Hossein Sadaghiani for instance after returning to Iran temporarily from Europe, helped to establish the first football club (Ferdowsi Club) in Mashhad. During his one-year stay in Mashhad, he arranged football matches between the club and the British Consulate-General. Before this, football was only played by foreign residents in Mashhad (especially the employees of the Telegraph Office and the British Consulate-General).

In places that had not entertained a significant foreign presence, such as Ardabil, it seems that the game was introduced in the 1920s by young men who had spent some time in the Caucasus.

=== 1950s to 1970s ===
By the 1950s and early 60s, football had become a popular sport in Iran, and teams from Khuzestan were considered the most successful. Tehran then slowly started becoming the football capital of Iran, and numerous great clubs emerged from there. Shahin FC, Oghab FC, and Taj, were all Tehran teams established in the mid-1940s and are still active. As the number of club teams increased the need for a national league became apparent, and ever since 1960, with the exception of a few years, a nationwide football league has existed in Iran. The Takhte Jamshid Cup, Azadegan League and the IPL being the most important ones.

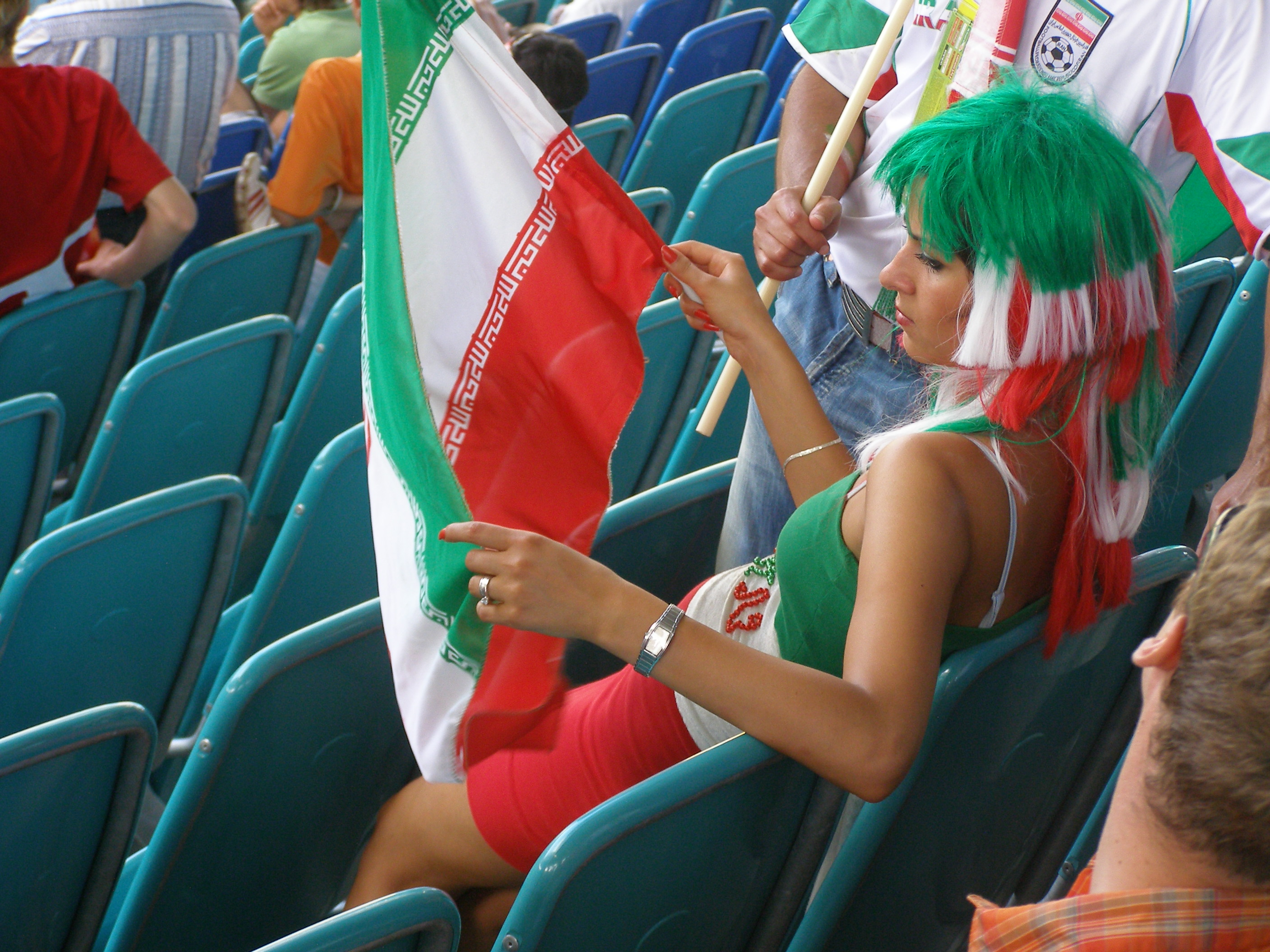
A female fan of Iran national football team, watching the match against Angola

=== 21st century ===
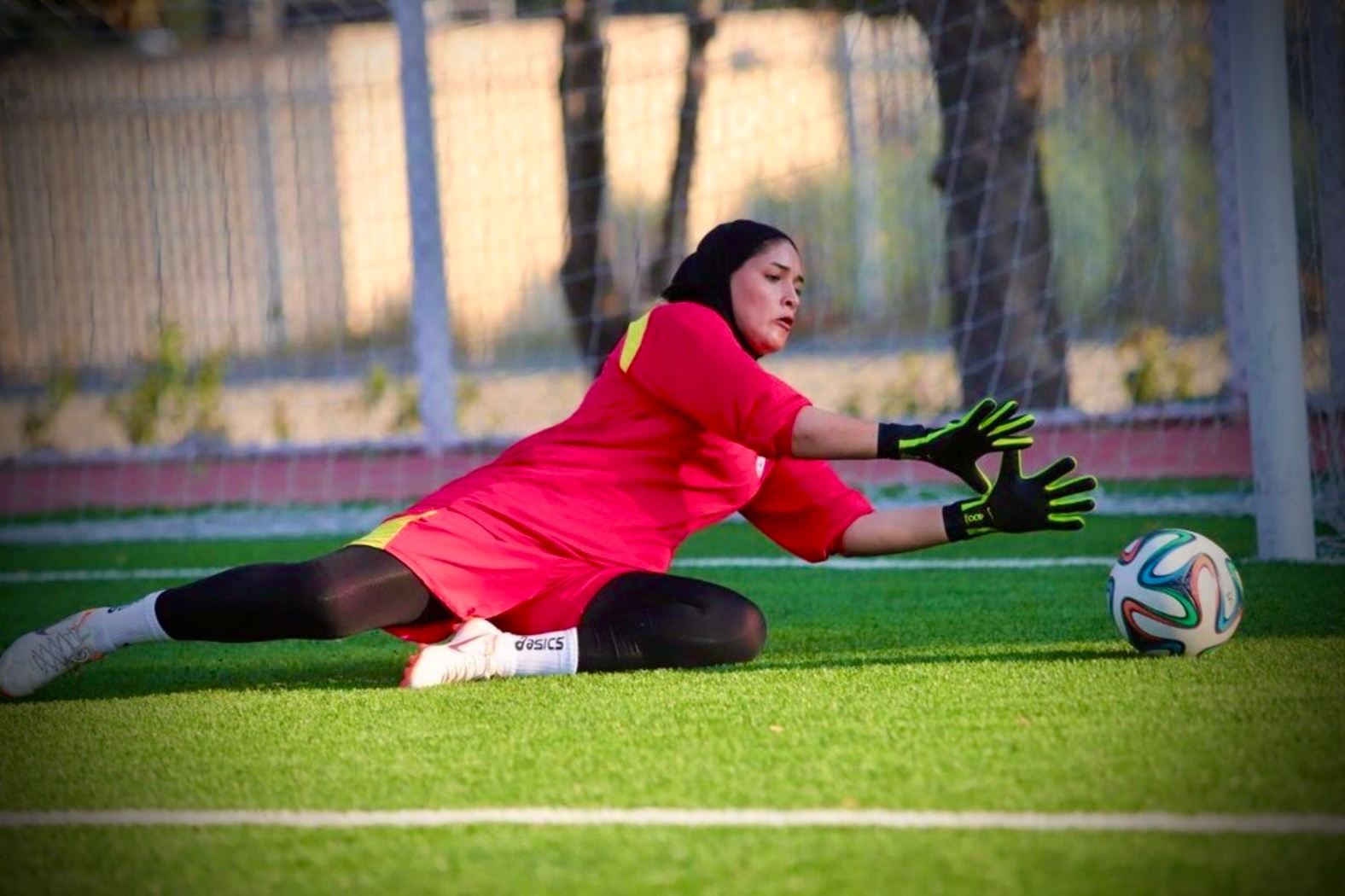
Zahra Khajavi, considered as an important goalkeeper in the Iranian national football team history

On 27 December 2019, Zahra Khajavi broke the clean sheet record of Iranian football by not receiving any goal for 953 minutes. Also, she, along with Alireza Biranvand, are known as the record holders of the longest hand throws in Iranian football. As one of the best goalkeepers in the history of Iranian football, Khajavi was able to once again draw the attention of the domestic media to the Iranian women's national football team. Her achievements played a key role in the progress of the women's national football team in these years.

=== 2020s ===
In the 2020s, women's football became more popular among young Iranians, both boys and girls.

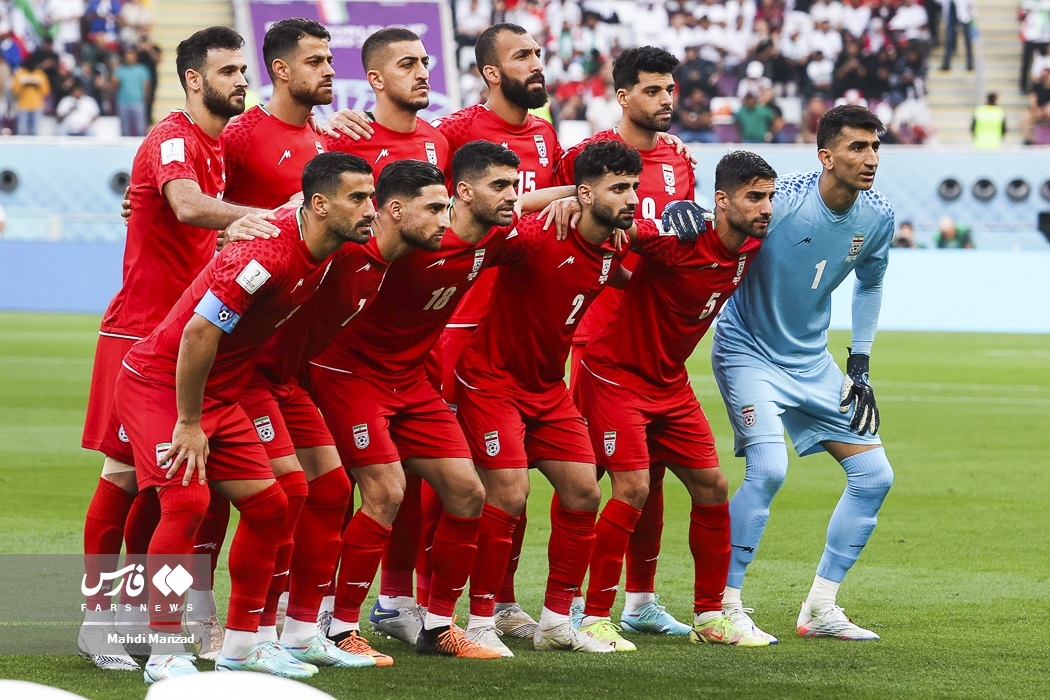
Iran men's team in the 2022 FIFA World Cup

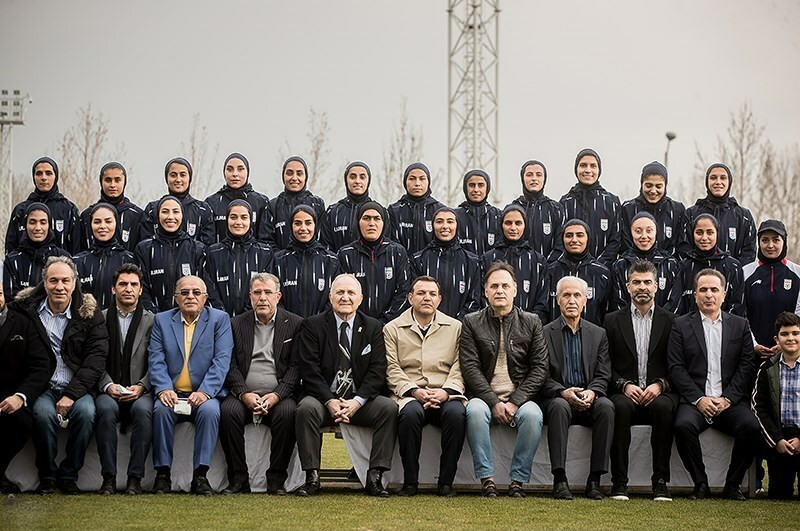
Iran women's team before the 2022 AFC Women's Asian Cup

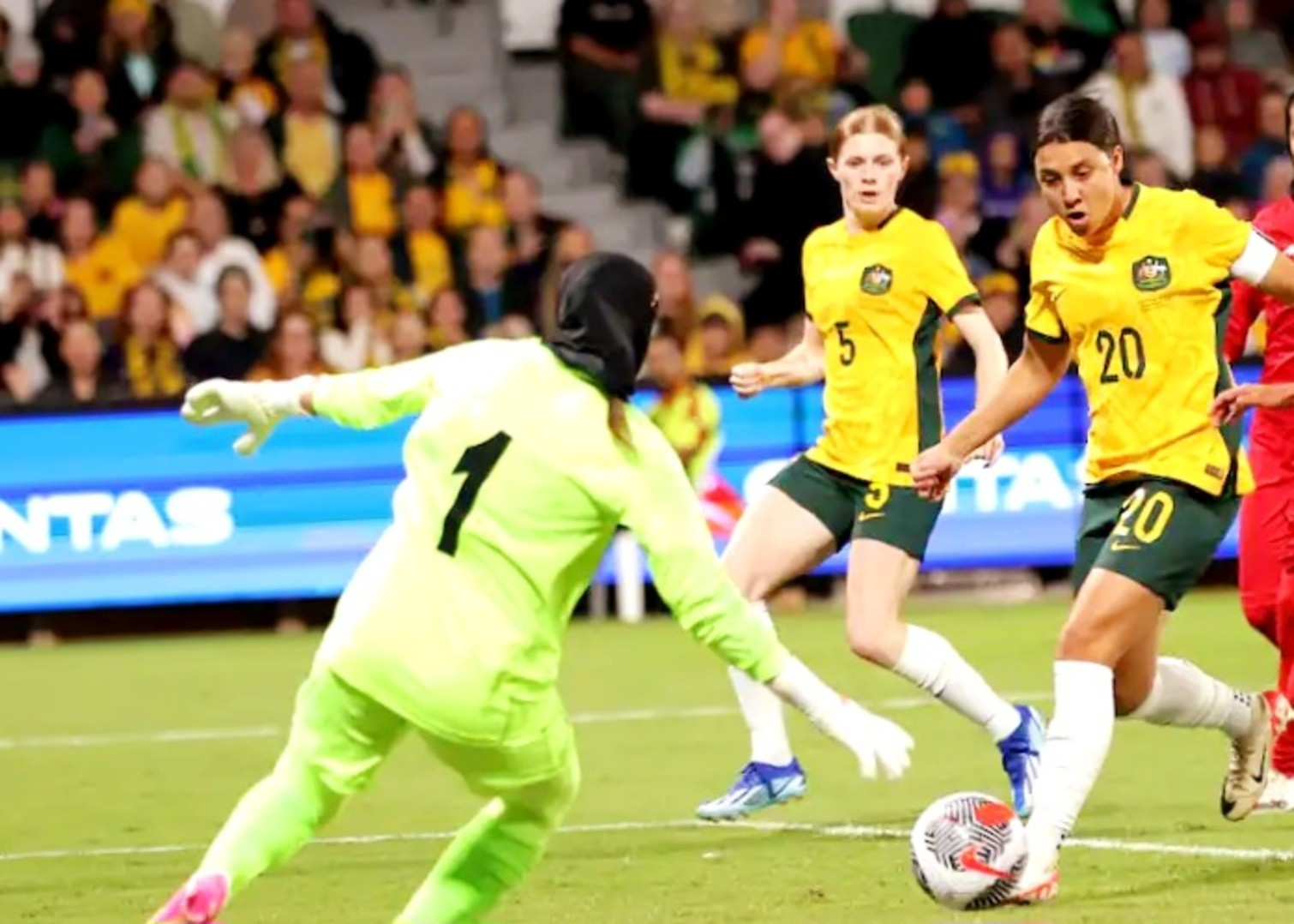
Iran against Australia, 2023

The COVID-19 pandemic in Iran forced the fixtures to be played without spectators, bringing new financial problems that lasted for years for some clubs.

==== Female spectators ====
In the AFC Champions League (organised by the Asian Football Confederation, problems on the Iranian sides were attracting media attention. In addition, International Arabic and English-language media reported on the violation of women's rights in Iranian stadiums, and the fact that Iranian women had been banned from football stadiums for about 40 years wince 2019, by the Iranian government. In 2018, FIFA, as the parent of the AFC, pressured Iran to let women into the stadiums in the ACL, but Iran only allowed a limited number of women to watch the 2018 final, which called by the media "a show". In October 2019, Iranian women allowed to watch a 2022 World Cup qualifier, when the men's team beat Cambodian football team 14–0. Up to 3,500 women attended the game in the 80,000-seat Azadi Stadium.

==== Other challenges ====
Persepolis and Esteghlal have been challenged by other sides due to direct ownership by the government of the Islamic Republic. In 2021, AFC investigated the matter.

== National teams ==
=== The predecessor of Iran men's national football team ===
==== Tehran XI ====
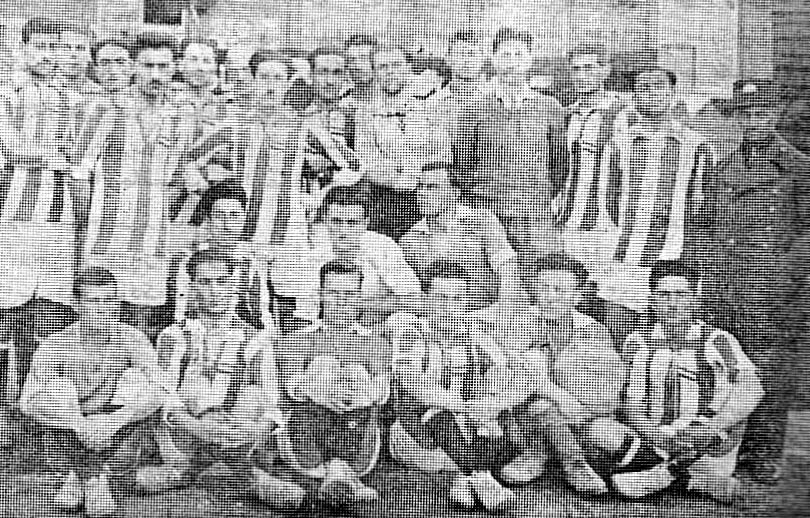
The first Iran selection football team that traveled to Baku in 1926.

In 1926 Tehran XI (selected players from Tehran Club, Toofan and Armenian Sports Club) traveled across the border to Baku, USSR, this was the first away football match for an Iranian team. This Tehran Select team is the predecessor of Iran's national football team.

In 1929 it was time for a return visit, and so a team from Baku was invited to play in Tehran in late November. To impress the visitors, grass had been planted on the state-owned football field. The last of the three games, all of which were won by the visitors, was attended by Abdolhossein Teymourtash, the powerful minister of court. The humiliating defeats, suffered on home ground, caused great consternation, so much so that some young men gave up football altogether. In subsequent years the interest in football waned, and newspapers hardly reported on those matches that did take place. However, all this changed with the return of crown prince Mohammad Reza Pahlavi from Switzerland in 1936 and arrival of Thomas R Gibson in the 1930s to promote the game.

- Head Coach: Mir Mehdi Varzandeh
- Squad:

Hossein-Ali Khan Sardar(Goalkeeper, captain)	Ahmad-Ali Khan Sardar	Mohammad-Ali Khan Sardar	Hossein Sadaghiani	Karim Zandi
Hasan Meftah	Ali Kani	Mohammad Ali Shokooh	Amir Aslani	Aziz Eqtedar
Akbar Heydari	Herand Galusetiyan	Naser Enshaa	Reza Qoli Kalantar	Azizollah Afkhami

The results were as follow:

#	Date	Opponent	Result	Score	Venue	Competition
1	Autumn 1926	(Transcaucasian Socialist Federative Soviet Republic) Baku XI	L	0–2	Baku, Transcaucasian SFSR, USSR	Friendly
2	Autumn 1926	(Transcaucasian Socialist Federative Soviet Republic) Azerbaijan Polytechnical Institute	D	0–0	Baku, Transcaucasian SFSR, USSR	Friendly
3	Autumn 1926	(Transcaucasian Socialist Federative Soviet Republic) Baku Youth XI	L	3–4	Baku, Transcaucasian SFSR, USSR	Friendly
4	Autumn 1926	(Transcaucasian Socialist Federative Soviet Republic) Taraqi Baku	L	1–3	Baku, Transcaucasian SFSR, USSR	Friendly
5	Nov 1929	(Transcaucasian Socialist Federative Soviet Republic) Baku XI	L	0–4	Tehran, Iran	Friendly
6	Nov 1929	(Transcaucasian Socialist Federative Soviet Republic) Baku XI	L	1–4	Tehran, Iran	Friendly
7	Nov 1929	(Transcaucasian Socialist Federative Soviet Republic) Baku XI	L	0–11	Tehran, Iran	Friendly

=== World War Two period ===
One man can be remembered, who contributed to Iranian football during the post-World War One period. Hossein Sadaghiani became active in sharing the knowledge of the game and also with growth of football, he became the first head coach of the Iranian national team, who later coached football teams of University of Tehran. The first match that the Iranian national football team played was on August 25, 1941, away at Afghanistan.

In 1942, when the Allied Forces were in Iran, Iran national football team defeated a British Military XI team in a friendly match played in Tehran. Match details as follow:

November 1942
00:00 UTC-3

Iran	1 – 0	(United Kingdom) British Army XI Football Team
Izadpanah

Amjadiyeh Stadium, Tehran
Attendance: 6,500

Iran team lineup were: Fathollah Minbashian, Mansour Hajian, Abbas Qarib, Aziz Farzanegan, Abbas Tandidehgar, Jamshid Malekshahi, Bakhtiar, Akbar Toofan, Ahmad Izadpanah and 2 more players. The team's head coach was Hossein Sadaghiani.

British Army XI lineup included players such as Wilf Mannion, Migger and Bick, Bertie Mee, Jimmy McCabe.

=== Post-World War Two period ===
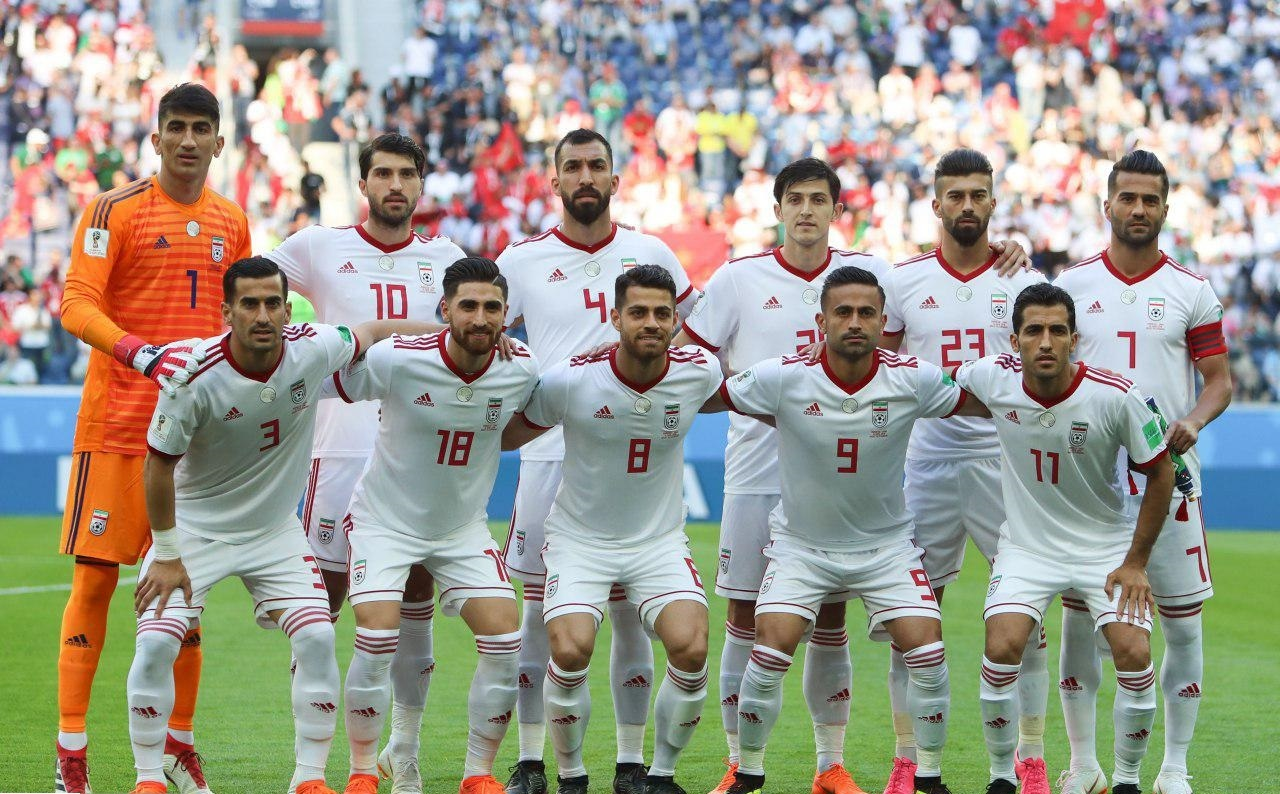
Iran national team at the 2018 FIFA World Cup in Russia

In the 1960s and 1970s, Iran established itself as one of Asia's top sides, winning the Asian Cup in 1968, 1972 and 1976, the only team to win the tournament three times in a row. In 1964 Iran qualified for the Olympic Games, but they finished last in their group with one point which came in a 1–1 draw against Mexico. Iran also qualified for the 1972, 1976 and 1980 Olympic Games. In 1978, Iran qualified for its first FIFA World Cup, held in Argentina. In the 1980s the Iran–Iraq War hindered the development of the national team and Iran missed out on several World Cups due to withdrawing from the qualifying stage. After a twenty-year absence, Iran qualified for the 1998 FIFA World Cup and recorded their first-ever World Cup victory, defeating the United States 2–1. Iran has also more recently qualified for the tournament in 2006, 2014, 2018 and 2022, failing to advance past the group stage on each occasion.

=== Persian lionesses ===
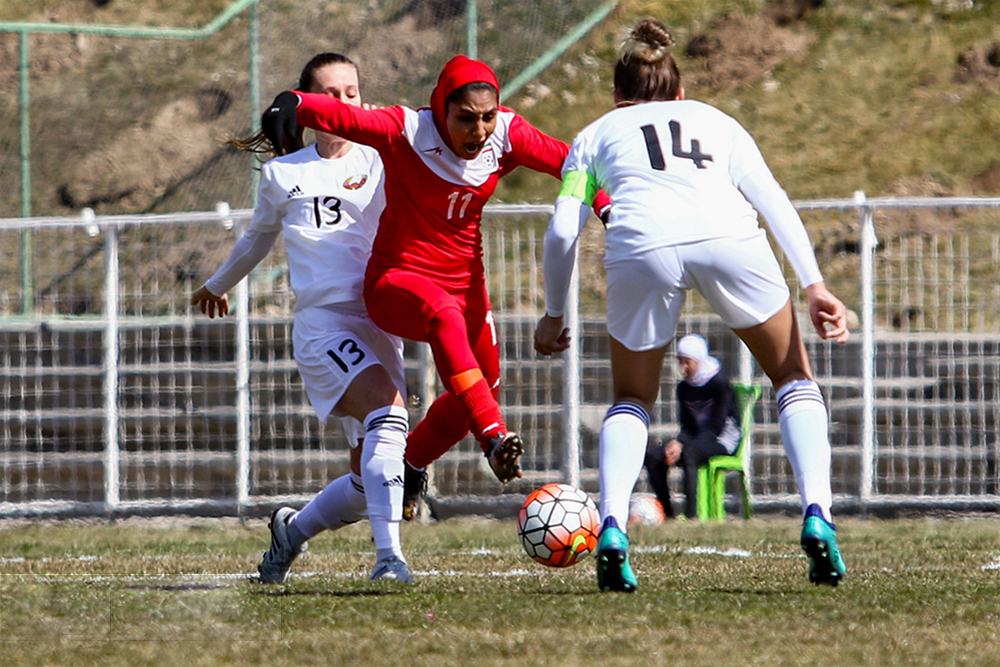
Iran vs Belarus friendly in 2019

The Iran women's national football team, nicknamed the Lionesses, represents Iran in international women's football around the world, and is controlled by the Football Federation of Iran. Iran plays their home matches on the Ararat Stadium.

=== Youth national teams ===
Iran fields youth national teams in men's and women's sections predominantly at the U17, U20 and U23 levels having enjoyed moderate success.

== Other football teams ==
=== Men's teams ===
Iran national futsal team: The Iran national futsal team represents Iran in international futsal competitions and is controlled by the Futsal Commission of the Iranian Football Federation. The "Kings of Asian Futsal" are by far the strongest Asian team and one of the best teams in the world according to the Futsal World Ranking. The Iranians are the regular participants of the FIFA Futsal World Cup reaching the third place in 2016 after eliminating the favorites, Brazil. Iran have won the first Futsal Confederations Cup in 2009 and also reached the second place in the Grand Prix de Futsal known as Futsal Mini-World Cup in multiple editions.

Iran national beach soccer team: Iran has won the AFC Beach Soccer Championship a record two times (2013, 2017) and has placed in the top four in every edition. Iran has also appeared in the FIFA Beach Soccer World Cup seven times, reaching the quarterfinals on three occasions (2013, 2015, 2017), and finishing in third place once (2017).

=== Women's teams ===
The Iran women's national futsal team represents the country in international women's futsal, and is controlled by the Iran Football Federation. The team usually known as one of the "world powers" in futsal.

Iran women's national beach soccer team, is being reviewed by the Iranian Football Federation.

== League system ==
=== Men's league system ===
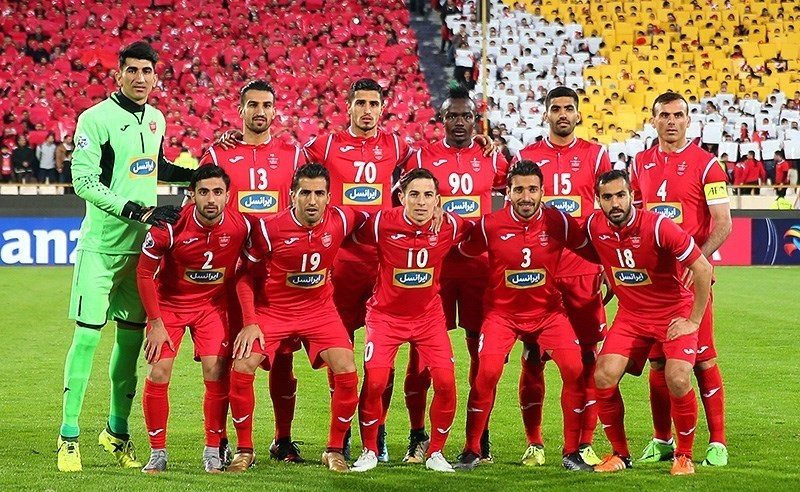
Persepolis is the most successful team in Iran's men's football league.

The current structure has been in place since 2001. The Persian Gulf Pro League is the highest level of club football in Iran. Below it is the Azadegan League, also known as the 1st division, which consists of two twelve-team groups. One level further down from that is the 2nd division which is made up of 28 teams evenly distributed into two groups. One step down, and the final nationwide league, is the 3rd division. This level has eight groups and 45 teams. Each groups contains teams that are located in the same area of the nation. The final level of the football system consists of 28 provincial leagues. Local teams from each province participate in these leagues, and some of the leagues are divided into further divisions.

The system works with a promotion-relegation system, meaning that a team from the lowest level of the system can make it to the top level after a number of years. The number of teams in each league often changes from season to season, due to the lack of any professional management in the lower levels of the system. Currently the IPL is the only league that is considered professional, despite many of its rules about club facilities and management being broken. It is not uncommon for teams in the lower levels of the system to change team names because of sponsorship issues or for teams to completely withdraw from a competition.

The top four levels of the men's system are managed by the FFIRI, while the bottom level leagues are managed by their respective provincial football committee. The Kowsar Women Football League is the primary women's football league in Iran.

=== Women's league system ===
The Kowsar Women Football League (Persian: لیگ کوثر بانوان فوتبال ایران, Lig-e Kâuser-e Banuan-e Futbal-e Iran) is a women's football league, run by the Football Federation Islamic Republic of Iran. At the top of the Iranian football league system, it is the country's primary competition for the sport. It was established in 2007. There is also a second division for women's.

== Major stadiums ==
#	Image	Stadium	Capacity	City	Home team
1		Naghsh-e Jahan Stadium	75,000	Isfahan	Sepahan
2		Azadi Stadium	74,000	Tehran	Iran national football team, Esteghlal and Persepolis
3		Yadegar-e Emam Stadium	65,000	Tabriz	Tractor
4		Pars Stadium	50,000	Shiraz	Fajr Sepasi

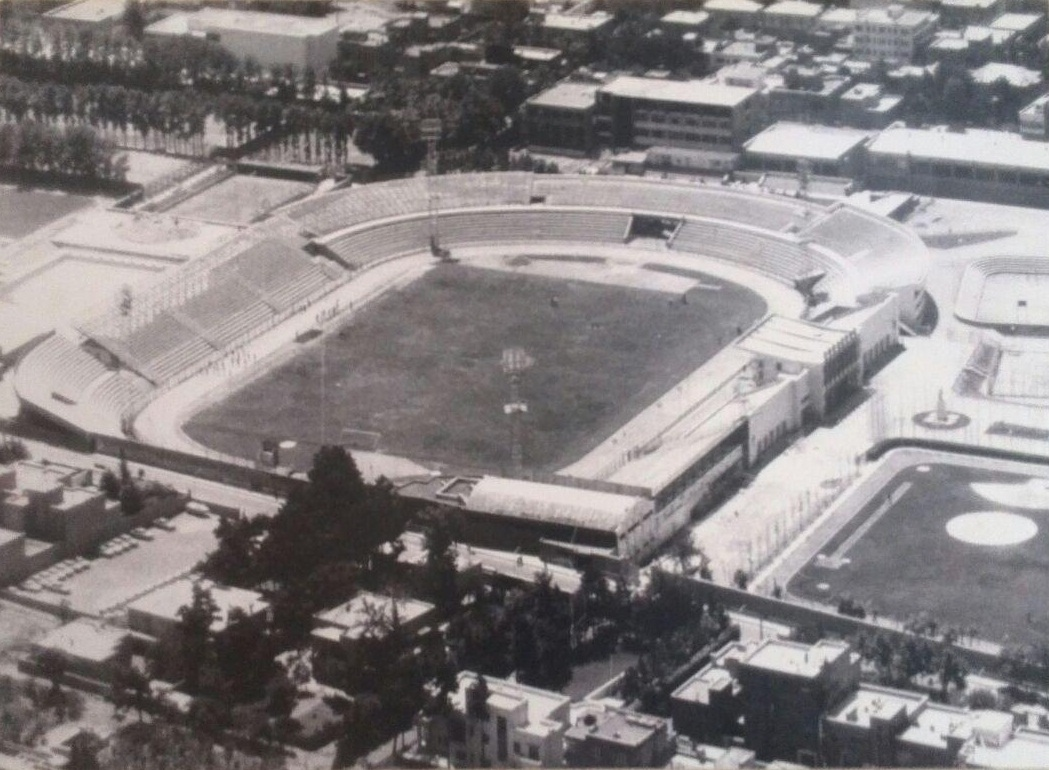
Before the construction of the Aryamehr (Azadi) Stadium in Tehran, Amjadieh Stadium held the title of national football stadium in Iran

- Azadi Stadium, Tehran
- Ali Daei Stadium, Ardebil
- Dr. Azodi Stadium, Rasht
- Bagh Shomal Stadium, Tabriz
- Enghelab Stadium, Karaj
- Foolad Shahr Stadium, Isfahan
- Ghadir Stadium, Ahvaz
- Hafezieh Stadium, Shiraz
- Imam Reza Stadium, Mashhad
- Naghsh-e-Jahan Stadium, Isfahan
- Pars Shiraz Stadium, Shiraz
- Rah Ahan Stadium, Tehran
- Samen Stadium, Mashhad
- Shahid Bahonar Stadium, Kerman
- Shahid Dastgerdi Stadium, Tehran
- Shahid Shiroudi Stadium, Tehran
- Shohada-ye Nowshahr Stadium, Noshahr
- Takhti Stadium, Abadan
- Takhti Stadium, Ahvaz
- Takhti Stadium, Bandar-e Anzali
- Takhti Stadium, Mashhad
- Takhti Stadium, Tehran
- Yadegar Emam Stadium, Qom
- Yadegar Emam Stadium, Tabriz
- Shohada Haft Tir Stadium, Babol
- Shahid Vatani Stadium, Qaemshahr

== Best Players ==
- Ali Daei
- Ali Parvin
- Naser Hejazi
- Farhad Majidi
- Mehdi Taremi
- Sardar Azmoun
- Ali Karimi
- Ahmad Reza Abedzadeh
- AliReza Jahan Bakhsh
- Mohammad Nosrati
- Naser Mohammad Khani
- Mohammad Panjali
- Vahid Hashemian
- Hamid Estili
- Karim Bagheri
- Mehdi Mahdavikia
- Hassan Habibi
- Khodadad Azizi
- Hamid AliDousti
- Hassan Roshan
- Iraj DanaeiFard
- Shahrokh Bayani
- Shahin Bayani
- Hussein Kalani
- Safar Iranpak

== Best Managers ==
- Heshmat Mohajerani
- Jalal Talebi
- Amir Ghalenoei
- Yahya GolMohammadi
- Mansour Pour Heydari
- Mansour Ebrahimzadeh
- Parviz Dehdari
- Mohammad Maieli Kohan
- Firouz Karimi
- Afshin Ghotbi

== Most successful clubs overall ==
As of 11 August 2025

local and lower league organizations are not included.

Club	Domestic Titles					International Titles			Overall titles
Club	Persian Gulf Pro League	Iran Championship Cup	Iranian Hazfi Cup	Iranian Super Cup	Total	AFC Champions League Elite	Asian Cup Winners' Cup	Total	Overall titles
Persepolis	**16**	-	7	**5**	**28**	-	**1**	1	**29**
Esteghlal	9	1	**8**	1	19	**2**	-	**2**	21
Sepahan	5	1	5	1	12	-	-	-	12
PAS Tehran	5	**3**	-	-	8	1	-	1	9
Zob Ahan Esfahan	-	-	4	1	5	-	-	-	5
Saipa	3	-	1	-	4	-	-	-	4
Foolad	2	-	1	1	4	-	-	-	4
Tractor	1	-	2	1	4	-	-	-	4
Malavan	-	-	3	-	3	-	-	-	3
Saba Qom	-	-	1	1	2	-	-	-	2
Esteghlal Khuzestan	1	-	-	-	1	-	-	-	1
AMST	-	1	-	-	1	-	-	-	1
Arya	-	1	-	-	1	-	-	-	1
Daraei	-	1	-	-	1	-	-	-	1
Jam Abadan	-	1	-	-	1	-	-	-	1
Kian	-	1	-	-	1	-	-	-	1
Paykan	-	1	-	-	1	-	-	-	1
Bahman	-	-	1	-	1	-	-	-	1
Bargh Shiraz	-	-	1	-	1	-	-	-	1
Fajr Sepasi Shiraz	-	-	1	-	1	-	-	-	1
Naft Tehran	-	-	1	-	1	-	-	-	1
Nassaji Mazandaran	-	-	1	-	1	-	-	-	1
Shahin Ahvaz	-	-	1	-	1	-	-	-	1

- The articles in italic indicate the defunct leagues and the defunct cups.
- The figures in **bold** indicate the most times this competition has been won by a team.

== Attendances ==
The average attendance per top-flight football league season and the club with the highest average attendance:

Season	League average	Best club	Best club average
2024-25	8,733	Tractor Club	44,071
2023-24	10,824	Esteghlal	34,150
2022-23	9,515	Tractor Club	33,375
2018-19	12,212	Tractor Club	46,963
2017-18	9,060	Persepolis	39,786
2016-17	8,086	Persepolis	48,567
2015-16	8,048	Persepolis	47,036
2014-15	6,921	Tractor Club	27,488
2013-14	7,631	Persepolis	29,467
2012-13	7,964	Esteghlal	34,250
2011-12	9,488	Tractor Club	39,533
2010-11	9,383	Tractor Club	42,000
2009-10	12,298	Tractor Club	57,647
2008-09	8,954	Persepolis	40,688
2007-08	11,235	Persepolis	60,000
2006-07	10,119	Esteghlal	35,000
2005-06	9,179	Esteghlal	33,467

Sources: League pages on Wikipedia

== See also ==
- Football in Tehran
- Iranian football league system
- List of Iranian football champions
- List of Iranian football club owners
- Women's football in Iran
