= Morvarid Petrochemical Company =

Iranian petrochemical company

Morvarid Petrochemical Company (MPC) شرکت پتروشیمی مروارید
- Type: Privately held company
- Traded as: TSE: ZF281
- ISIN: IRO3ZF280001
- Industry: Petrochemical
- Founded: 2005
- Founder: National Petrochemical Company
- Headquarters: Asaluyeh, Iran
- Products: Ethylene; Ethylene glycol: Monoethylene glycol (MEG); Diethylene glycol (DEG); Triethylene glycol (TEG)
- Net income: 43,380 billion rials (2021)
- Owner: Petrofarhang; Tappico
- Website: www.morvaridpc.ir/en/home

The Morvarid Petrochemical Company (MPC) (Persian: شرکت پتروشیمی مروارید, Shirkat-e Petroshimi-ye Morvaarid) is an Iranian petrochemical enterprise located in the South Pars Special Economic Energy Zone in Asaluyeh, Bushehr Province.

== History ==
The "Fifth Olefin Complex" project, later renamed Morvarid Petrochemical Company, was one of the initiatives approved in Iran's Third Five-Year Development Plan. The project was entrusted to the National Petrochemical Company of Iran (NPC) to prevent the wasteful flaring of associated gas extracted from Iran's continental shelf oil fields. Originally named "Kharg Olefin Petrochemical," the project's name was changed in 2005 to "Morvarid Petrochemical" to avoid confusion with Kharg Petrochemical Company. Initially, the complex was planned for Kharg Island. However, delays in completing the island's Natural Gas Liquids (NGL) unit, intended as the feedstock source, led to its relocation to Phase II of the South Pars Special Economic Zone in Asaluyeh. Construction of the Morvarid Petrochemical complex began in late 2005 on a 20-hectare plot. The NPC assigned the construction to a consortium comprising the French company Technip Energies and the Iranian company Nargan. The company's first phase was inaugurated on July 28, 2010, in a ceremony attended by Mahmoud Ahmadinejad, the then President of Iran.

== Operations ==
Morvarid Petrochemical Company operates two production units for ethylene and ethylene glycol. The ethylene unit has an annual production capacity of 500,000 tons, of which 340,000 tons are used as feedstock for the company's ethylene glycol unit. The remaining 160,000 tons are sold to external customers. The ethylene unit is supplied with 650,000 tons of ethane annually from other South Pars Special Economic Energy Zone phases. The ethylene glycol unit produces 500,000 tons of monoethylene glycol (MEG), 50,000 tons of diethylene glycol (DEG), and 3,400 tons of triethylene glycol (TEG) annually. All three products are produced in liquid form. The ethylene glycol unit's feedstock includes 340,000 tons of ethylene from the company's ethylene unit and 368,000 tons of oxygen supplied by the Damavand Petrochemical Company. Morvarid Petrochemical contributes 35% of Iran's MEG and 6% of its ethylene production.

== Ownership ==
Initially, the National Petrochemical Company, a state-owned entity, fully owned Morvarid Petrochemical Company. However, on August 7, 2010, the Iranian government transferred more than 40% of the company's shares to Petrofarhang —a holding company owned by staff of Iran's Ministry of Education— as repayment for government debts. Today, Petrofarhang (Reserve Fund of the staff of Iranian Ministry of Education) and TAPPICO (a subsidiary of Iran's Social Security Organization) are the company's largest shareholders.

== Sanctions ==
In late October 2020, the US Treasury Department sanctioned eight Iranian entities, including Morvarid and Arya Sasol Petrochemicals, for their involvement in purchasing and selling Iranian petrochemical products. The US Treasury maintained that the company is part of the global network of entities that the Iranian regime uses to fund terrorist groups.
