= Fanavaran Petrochemical Company =

Iranian petrochemical company

Coordinates: 30.4658°N 49.0228°E

Fanavaran Petrochemical Company شرکت پتروشیمی فن‌آوران
- Company type: Public company
- Traded as: TSE: PFAN1; ISIN: IRO1PFAN0001
- Industry: Petrochemical industry
- Founded: 1998
- Headquarters: Mahshahr, Iran
- Products: Methanol; Acetic acid Carbon monoxide
- Owner: 51% Tamin Petroleum and Petrochemical Investment Company
- Website: www.fnpetro.ir/en/home

Fanavaran Petrochemical Company (Persian: شرکت پتروشیمی فن‌آوران, romanized: Sherkat-e Petroshimi-ye Fan-Avaran) is an Iranian petrochemical company in Bandar-e Emam Khomeyni, Khuzestan, which was established 1998.

== Overview ==
Established in 1998 in Khuzestan province on 25 hectares next to the Persian Gulf coast of the Bandar-e Emam Khomeyni Petrochemical Special Economic Zone, Fanavaran Petrochemical Company was founded by the National Petrochemical Company. On October 22, 2007, as part of the privatization policies, the National Petrochemical Company transferred the ownership and management of this company to the private sector. After that, the shares of Fanavaran Petrochemical under the name of "PFAN1" became tradable in the Tehran Stock Exchange for individuals and other companies.

== Products and Exports ==
Methanol, acetic acid, and carbon monoxide are three products produced by Fanavaran Petrochemical Company. Part of these petrochemical products is sold as feed in the Petrochemical special economic zone of Bandar-e Emam Khomeyni to other petrochemical companies, such as Bandar Imam Petrochemical. Another part of its products, especially acetic acid, is exported to China, India, Iraq, Uzbekistan, Azerbaijan, Turkey, and Syria.

== Sanctions ==
In 2022, the United States Treasury Department sanctioned Fanavaran, Kharg, and Marun petrochemical company in order to target the export of Iranian prochemical products.
