= Amirkabir petrochemical company =

Amirkabir Petrochemical Company
- Type: Subsidiary
- Industry: Petrochemical
- Founded: Spring 2005
- Founder: National Petrochemical Company
- Headquarters: Imam Khomeini Port Special Economic Zone, Iran
- Key people: Hesam Khoshbinfar, CEO
- Products: Chemicals
- Owner: Refah Capital Development Company 51%
- Website: www.akpc.ir/en/home

Amirkabir Petrochemical Company (Persian: شرکت پتروشیمی امیرکبیر) is an Iranian petrochemical company located in Bandar Imam in southern Iran in the Petrochemical Special Economic Zone and northwest of Bandar Imam Petrochemical Complex on 55 hectares of land.

== History ==
In 1998, the National Petrochemical Company of Iran established Amirkabir Petrochemical Company to implement the Sixth Olefin project. Subsequently, Amirkabir Petrochemical Company implemented the Sixth Olefin project on 55 hectares of land in the Imam Khomeini Port Special Economic Zone, which was finally commissioned in 2005.

== Geographical Location ==
Amirkabir Petrochemical Complex is located in Bandar Imam in the south of the Petrochemical Special Economic Zone and approximately northwest of Bandar Imam Petrochemical Complex in Site 4; on 55 hectares of land.

== Products ==
Amir Kabir Company produces various types of light, heavy and linear light polyethylene. Amirkabir Petrochemical is known as the producer of the widest range of polyethylene products in Iran.

== Production Units ==
This unit officially went into operation in June 2005 and started production. The ethylene unit is designed to produce 520,000 tons of ethylene gas and 154,000 tons of propylene annually.

The heavy polyethylene (HD) unit is the first unit commissioned at Amirkabir Petrochemical in Imam Khomeini Port Special Economic Zone in 2002. The production capacity of the HD polyethylene unit is 140,000 tons per year and the products of this unit cover about 18 different grades including: EX1, CRP100N, CRP100B, EX2, EX3, EX4, EX5, BL2, BL3, BL4, BL5, BL6, BL7, BL8, I1, I2, I3 and I4. The heavy polyethylene unit consists of 9 sections. Sections 100 to 400 are known as polymer sections and sections 500 to 700 as pelletizing sections. This unit is exclusively certified with PE100 for heavy polyethylene product from Bodycot and also Food Grade Contact.

The light polyethylene (LD) unit was built under Lyondellbasell license, in cooperation with Daelim South Korea, Simon Carves UK and Namvaran Iran, and commissioned in February 2011. Production is by radical chain polymerization in Tubular reactor. The design capacity of this unit is 300,000 tons per year.

The linear low-density polyethylene (LLD) unit was commissioned in September 2005. The feedstocks consumed in this unit are ethylene and hydrogen from the ethylene unit, and butene-1 from the B1 unit. This unit is based on INOVENN G method and BP license, later renamed INEOSS. This unit is designed for 32.5 tons per hour for 8,000 working hours amounting to 260,000 tons per year of LL0209 grade.

The butadiene (BD) unit was commissioned in 2005 and licensed by BASF Germany. This unit is designed to produce 50,000 tons of butadiene and its feedstock is 105,000 tons of C4 CUT from the ethylene unit, from which BD is separated in this unit. This material is the main raw material for ABS, PBR and SBR synthetic rubbers used to manufacture automotive tires and any rubber.

The butene-1 (B1) unit was commissioned in 2004 to produce butene-1 as comonomer or co-monomers in polyethylene units such as linear low-density polyethylene and heavy polyethylene, which use butene-1 to adjust polymer density. The feedstock for this unit is ethylene supplied by the ethylene unit. The nominal capacity of this unit is 20,000 tons and actual production is 20,000 tons. Its by-products are C6 and C6 PLUS (hexene compounds) which are returned to the ethylene unit and used in the gasoline unit. The B1 unit license is also from Axens France, a branch of IFP. In addition to other Amirkabir Petrochemical management system standards, this unit is exclusively certified with REACH certificate from CHEM SERVICE company according to European standards for butene-1 product.

== Shareholders ==
The shareholders of Amirkabir Petrochemical consist of 10 major companies. Refah Capital Development Company with 51%, Civil Servants Pension Fund Investment Company with 13%, Navid Zar Shimi Industrial Company with 20%, and Saderafar Company with 9% own the largest shares among the 10 shareholding companies.

== See also ==
- PADJAM Polymer Development Company
