= Boyuk Jeddikar =

Iranian footballer

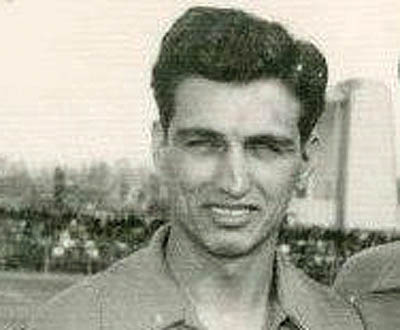

Personal information
- Date of birth: 6 December 1929
- Place of birth: Tabriz, Iran
- Date of death: 18 December 2013 (aged 84)
- Place of death: Tehran, Iran
- Height: 1.65 m (5 ft 5 in)
- Position: Left winger

Youth career
- 1944–1945: Tehranjavan

Senior career*
Years	Team	Apps	(Gls)
1945–1946	Tehranjavan		
1946–1949	Tour		
1949–1957	Taj		
1957–1958	Viktoria 89 Berlin		
1958–1968	Taj		
Total		334	(143)

International career
1950–1965	Iran	29	(2)
- * Club domestic league appearances and goals

Boyuk Jeddikar (Persian: بیوک جدی‌کار; 6 December 1929 – 18 December 2013) was an Iranian footballer.

He is known for being the first footballer in Iranian football history to be transferred from an Iranian club to a foreign club.

== Club career ==
Jedikar first started playing in the position of goalkeeper. His talent of using the left-foot was discovered by coach Ali Danaeifard who suggested that Jeddikar should move upfront and play as a left striker. This discovery paid off and Jeddikar soon became one of the best footballers in the country.

In 1957, he was transferred to Viktoria 89 Berlin on a three-year contract with a 1500 Deutschmarks a month salary, however his time in Germany was shortened when his father died, so after only 9 months Jeddikar returned to Iran to resume his career with Taj SC (currently Esteghlal).

Prior to Jeddikar's transfer, past Iranian footballers only had played outside Iran whilst they were studying abroad such as Hossein Sadaghiani (Belgium, Turkey and Austria), Hossein-Ali Khan Sardar (Belgium and Switzerland), Ahmad-Ali Khan Sardar (Belgium), Khan Khanan (Belgium) and Masoud Boroumand (United States and Lebanon) were all footballers studying and playing abroad. Jedikar's transfer to Germany paved the way for future footballers such as Parviz Koozehkanani, Hamid Shirzadegan and Mohammad Reza Adelkhani.

== International career ==
At the age of 17 he was selected for Tehran XI. However his first national cap was versus Afghanistan in 1950 and his last cap was versus Turkey in 1965.
