= Tehran XI =

- Full name: Tehran XI
- Nickname: Team Melli
- Founded: 1926
Home colours	Away colours

Tehran XI (Persian: منتخب تهران, romanized: Muntaxab Tehrân, lit. 'Tehran Selection') was an Iranian football team founded in 1926 from Tehran that was seen as the predecessor of the Iran's national football team. The players were chosen from Tehran Club, Toofan Club and Armenian Sports Club.

== History ==
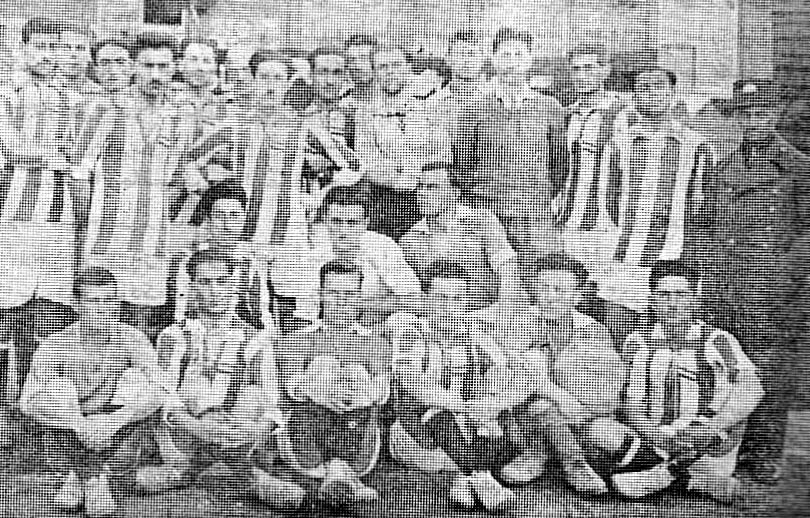
The very first Iran selection football team that traveled to Baku in 1926.

In 1926 Tehran XI (selected players from Tehran Club, Toofan Club and Armenian Sports Club) traveled across the border to Baku, USSR, this was the first away football match for an Iranian team. This Tehran Select team is the predecessor of Iran's national football team.

In 1929 it was time for a return visit, and so a team from Baku was invited to play in Tehran in late November. To impress the visitors, grass had been planted on the state-owned football field. The last of the three games, all of which were won by the visitors, was attended by Abdolhossein Teymourtash, the powerful minister of court. The humiliating defeats, suffered on home ground, caused great consternation, so much so that some young men gave up football altogether. In subsequent years the interest in football waned, and newspapers hardly reported on those matches that did take place. However, all this changed with the return of crown prince Mohammad Reza Pahlavi from Switzerland in 1936 and the arrival of Thomas R. Gibson in the 1930s to promote the game.

== Squad ==
- Head Coach: Mir Mehdi Varzandeh

=== Squad ===
Note: Flags indicate national team as defined under FIFA eligibility rules; some limited exceptions apply. Players may hold more than one non-FIFA nationality.

No.	Pos.	Nation	Player
—	GK	IRN	Hossein-Ali Khan Sardar
—		IRN	Ahmad-Ali Khan Sardar
—		IRN	Mohammad-Ali Khan Sardar
—		IRN	Hossein Sadaghiani
—		IRN	Karim Zandi
—		IRN	Hasan Meftah
—		IRN	Ali Kani
—		IRN	Mohammad Ali Shokooh

No.	Pos.	Nation	Player
—		IRN	Amir Aslani
—		IRN	Aziz Eqtedar
—		IRN	Akbar Heydari
—		IRN	Herand Galusetiyan
—		IRN	Naser Enshaa
—		IRN	Reza Qoli Kalantar
—		IRN	Azizollah Afkhami

== Results ==
The results were as follow:

#	Date	Opponent	Result	Score	Venue	Competition
1	22 November 1926	(Transcaucasian Socialist Federative Soviet Republic) Baku Youth XI	L	3–4	Balaxanı Stadium; Baku, Transcaucasian SFSR, USSR	Friendly
2	November 1926	(Transcaucasian Socialist Federative Soviet Republic) Baku XI	L	0–2	Balaxanı Stadium; Baku, Transcaucasian SFSR, USSR	Friendly
3	November 1926	(Transcaucasian Socialist Federative Soviet Republic) Azerbaijan Polytechnical Institute	D	0–0	Balaxanı Stadium; Baku, Transcaucasian SFSR, USSR	Friendly
4	November 1926	(Transcaucasian Socialist Federative Soviet Republic) Taraqi Baku	L	1–3	Balaxanı Stadium; Baku, Transcaucasian SFSR, USSR	Friendly
5	November 1929	(Transcaucasian Socialist Federative Soviet Republic) Baku XI	L	0–4	Daneshsara Field; Tehran, Iran	Friendly
6	November 1929	(Transcaucasian Socialist Federative Soviet Republic) Baku XI	L	1–3	Daneshsara Field; Tehran, Iran	Friendly
7	22 November 1929	(Transcaucasian Socialist Federative Soviet Republic) Baku XI	L	0–11	Daneshsara Field; Tehran, Iran	Friendly
