= Bandar Imam Petrochemical Company =

Iranian petrochemical company

- Type: Public company
- Industry: Petroleum industry
- Founded: 1973
- Founder: National Petrochemical Company
- Headquarters: Bandar-e Mahshahr, Iran
- Owner: Persian Gulf Petrochemical Industries (69%)

Bandar Imam Petrochemical Company (BIPC) (Persian: شرکت پتروشیمی بندر امام) is an Iranian petrochemical company that produces chemicals, aromatics, polymers, and LPG. The main petrochemical products - ethylene, propylene, butadiene, benzene, toluene and xylenes - are manufactured at this complex. They are mostly converted into intermediate products and final goods like light polyethylene, heavy polyethylene, synthetic rubber, polyvinyl chloride, paraxylene and MTBE.

This company was formed in 1973 through a joint venture between the National Petrochemical Company of Iran and Japanese Mitsui under the name “Iran-Japan Petrochemical Company”. However, in 1986, after Mitsui withdrew from the project to build the complex, all of its shares were purchased by the National Petrochemical Company of Iran and the name was changed to Bandar Imam Petrochemical Company.

Bandar Imam Petrochemical Company was acquired by the Persian Gulf Petrochemical Industries in 2010.

The head office and plants of this company are located near the city of Bandar-e Mahshahr in Khuzestan province. The company is situated on a land area of approximately 270 hectares on the northwestern coast of the Persian Gulf in Khuzestan Province, 160 km southeast of Ahvaz and 84 km east of Abadan in the Imam Khomeini Port Special Economic Zone.

== See also ==
- PADJAM Polymer Development Company
