= List of Iranian football club owners =

Most of football clubs in Iran are fully funded and indirectly intervented by the government and military organizations.

== Kowsar Women's Pro League ==
Kowsar Women's Pro League Club Owners
| Owner type (#) | Percent |
| Government (10) | 62.5% |
| Private (6) | 37.5% |

| Club | Owner(s) | Sector |
|---|---|---|
| Bam Khatoon | IBKO Group of Companies | Private/Industrial |
| Paykan | Iran Khodro | Government/Industrial |
| Sepahan | Mobarakeh Steel Co. | Government/Industrial |
| Malavan | Iranian Navy | Military |

== Persian Gulf Pro League 2024-25 ==
Persian Gulf Pro League Club Owners
| Owner type (#) | Percent |
| Private (10) | 62.5% |
| Government (6) | 37.5% |

| Club | Owner(s) | Sector |
|---|---|---|
| Aluminium | IRALCO | Government/Industrial |
| Chadormalou | Chadormalu Mining and Industrial Company | Private/Industrial |
| Esteghlal | Pars Petrochemical Co: 20% BSPC: 20% BIPC: 20% STPC: 20% PGPIC: 5% MSY: 3.54% Public Shareholders: 11.46% | Private/Industrial |
| Esteghlal Khuzestan | Iran National Steel Industrial Group | Government/Industrial |
| Foolad | Foolad Khuzestan Company | Government/Industrial |
| Gol Gohar | Golgohar Mining and Industrial Company | Private/Industrial |
| Havadar | Hirkania Technology Development Investment Company | Private |
| Kheybar | Masoud Abdi | Private |
| Malavan | Ahmad Donyamali 70% Iranian Navy 30% | Private/Military |
| Mes Rafsanjan | National Mes Company | Government/Industrial |
| Nassaji | Reza Haddadian | Private |
| Persepolis | Shahr Bank: 30% Bank Mellat: 20% Tejarat Bank: 20% Bank Saderat Iran: 5.175% MSY: 5.158% Refah Bank: 5% EN Bank: 5% Public Shareholders: 9.667% | Private |
| Sepahan | Mobarakeh Steel Co. | Government/Industrial |
| Shams Azar | Shams Azar Food Industry Company | Private |
| Tractor | Mohammad Reza Zanouzi Motlagh | Private |
| Zob Ahan | Isfahan Steel Co. | Government/Industrial |

== Azadegan League ==
Azadegan League Club Owners
| Owner type (#) | Percent |
| Private (10) | 41.6% |
| Government (9) | 37.5% |
| Municipality (3) | 12.5% |
| Military (2) | 8.3% |

| Club | Owner(s) | Sector |
|---|---|---|
| Aluminium Hormozgan | Almahdi Aluminium Co. | Government/Industrial |
| Damash Gilan | Aria Investment Development Company | Private |
| Etka Gorgan | Seyyed Alireza Miri | Private/Industrial |
| Fajr Sepasi | Revolutionary Guards | Military |
| Foolad Novin | Foolad Khuzestan Co. | Government/Industrial |
| Foolad Yazd | Foolad Yazd Co. | Government/Industrial |
| Giti Pasand | Ali Jannati | Private |
| Gol Gohar | Gol Gohar Mining Co. | Government/Industrial |
| Iranjavan | | Private |
| Mes Kerman | National Mes Company | Government/Industrial |
| Mes Rafsanjan | National Mes Company | Government/Industrial |
| Naft Gachsaran | Ministry of Petroleum | Government/Industrial |
| Naft Masjed Soleyman | Ministry of Petroleum | Government/Industrial |
| Nassaji Mazandaran | Hossein Ghasemnejad | Private/Industrial |
| Niroo Zamini | Islamic Republic of Iran Army | Military |
| Parseh Tehran | Bahman Abedini | Private |
| Pas Hamedan | Hamedan Province Governance | Government |
| Paykan | Iran Khodro Co. | Government/Industrial |
| Rahian Kermanshah | Salman Karimi | Private |
| Sanat Naft | Ministry of Petroleum | Government/Industrial |
| Shahrdari Ardabil | Ardabil Municipality | Public |
| Shahrdari Bandar Abbas | Bandar Abbas Municipality | Public |
| Shahrdari Tabriz | Tabriz Municipality | Public |
| Yazd Louleh | Stila Kavi Yazd | Private/Industrial |
