= Zagros Petrochemical Company =

Iranian petrochemical company

- Company type: Subsidiary; TSE: PZGZ1; ISIN: IRO3PZGZ0003
- Industry: Petrochemical industry
- Founded: 2000
- Founder: Lurgi AG, PIDEC
- Headquarters: Asaluyeh, Iran
- Key people: CEO: Matin Didari
- Products: Methanol
- Website: www.zpcir.com/en/home

The Zagros Petrochemical Company (Persian: شرکت پتروشیمی زاگرس) is an Iranian petrochemical company established in 2000 with the aim of implementing Iran's Third Economic Development Plan, and to access global markets and gain a suitable share of the methanol market. This company was built on a 31-hectare site in the South Pars Special Energy Economic Zone in Asaluyeh. The Company has been sanctioned by the United States Department of the Treasury.

== History ==
Under a contract with the German company Lurgi and the Iranian company PIDEC, the construction process of the first phase of Zagros Petrochemical began in 2001 with an annual capacity of 1,650,000 tons of methanol, and was completed in 2006. The second phase of this company was completed in 2009. With the completion of the second phase, Zagros Petrochemical Company, with an annual production capacity of 3,300,000 tons of methanol, became the fifth-largest producer of this product in the world.

== Products ==
The main product of Zagros Petrochemical Company is AA grade methanol. This company ranks among the largest methanol producers in the world. The nominal production capacity of the Zagros Petrochemical Complex is 3.3 million tons. Zagros Petrochemical Company is the largest methanol producer in Iran. In 2023, this company accounted for nearly 2 percent of global methanol production.

== Social Responsibility ==
To fulfill its social responsibility, Zagros Petrochemical built a multi-purpose sports complex specifically for women, valued at 50 billion rials, in Bandar Siraf.

== See also ==
- PADJAM Polymer Development Company
