= Watson Valve Services =

Watson Valve Services, Incorporated, known as Watson Valve is an industrial company based in Houston, Texas. It makes, repairs and modifies valves used in the petrochemical industry. The firm is privately owned and established in 1972.
