= Jam petrochemical company =

Iranian petrochemical company

Jam Petrochemical Company شرکت پتروشیمی جم
- Type: Public company
- Traded as: TSE: PJMX4; ISIN: IRR1PJMZ0104
- Industry: Petrochemical
- Founded: 2000
- Founder: National Petrochemical Company
- Headquarters: Asaluyeh, Iran
- Products: Olefin high-density polyethylene linear low-density polyethylene butadiene butene-1
- Website: jpcomplex.ir/en

The Jam Petrochemical Company (Persian: شرکت پتروشیمی جم, romanized: Sherkat-e Petroshimi-ye Jam), (JPC) is an Iranian petrochemical company in Asaluyeh, Bushehr province, which was established in 2000.

== History ==
Jam Petrochemical Company (JPC), established in 2000, was founded as part of Iran's national strategy to develop its petrochemical industry by utilizing resources from the South Pars Gas Field. Located on a 77-hectare site in the Pars Special Economic Energy Zone in Asaluyeh, Bushehr Province, JPC was created under Iran's Third Economic Development Plan to maximize the economic potential of South Pars gas resources. Known as the "Olefins 10" project within the National Petrochemical Company's framework, JPC benefits from proximity to essential resources, including raw materials, fuel, and infrastructure such as ports and roads, facilitating its role in both domestic and international markets and supporting Iran's transition toward non-oil exports.

== Units and products ==
Jam Petrochemical Company's production complex includes multiple specialized units that produce a diverse range of petrochemical products. Key units include the olefin, high-density polyethylene (HDPE), linear low-density polyethylene (LLDPE), butadiene, and butene-1 units. These facilities collectively make JPC one of the largest olefin producers globally and a significant supplier of polymer products in Iran. The company's product portfolio includes various grades of polyethylene and other petrochemical derivatives, catering to markets in the Middle East and beyond.

== Sanctions ==
In July 2022, the United States Treasury Department sanctioned Jam petrochemical company in order to target the export of Iranian petrochemical products.

== See also ==
- National Iranian Petrochemical Company
- PADJAM Polymer Development Company
