= Zagros (disambiguation) =

Zagros often refers to the Zagros Mountains of western Asia (Iran, Iraq, Turkey).

Zagros may also refer to:

- Zagros fold and thrust belt, a geologic zone (collision of the Arabian and Eurasian plates)
- Zagros Airlines, Iran
- Zagros Petrochemical Company, Iran
- Zagros District, Ilam province, Iran, a small administrative subdivision
- Zagros TV, a satellite TV station in Iraqi Kurdistan
