= Kharg Petrochemical Company =

Iranian petrochemical company

Coordinates: 29°14′42″N 50°18′36″E

Kharg Petrochemical Company شرکت پتروشیمی خارگ
- Company type: Public company
- Traded as: TSE: PKHA1; ISIN: IRO1PKHA0001
- Industry: Petrochemical industry
- Founded: 1965
- Founder: National Petrochemical Company
- Headquarters: Kharg Island, Iran, Tehran, Iran
- Products: Methanol; Propane; Butane; Sulfur; Pentane
- Website: www.khargpetrochemical.ir

Kharg Petrochemical Company (Persian: شرکت پتروشیمی خارگ, romanized: Sherkat-e Petroshimi-ye Kharg), is an Iranian petrochemical company in Kharg Island, a continental island of Iran in the Persian Gulf.

== History ==
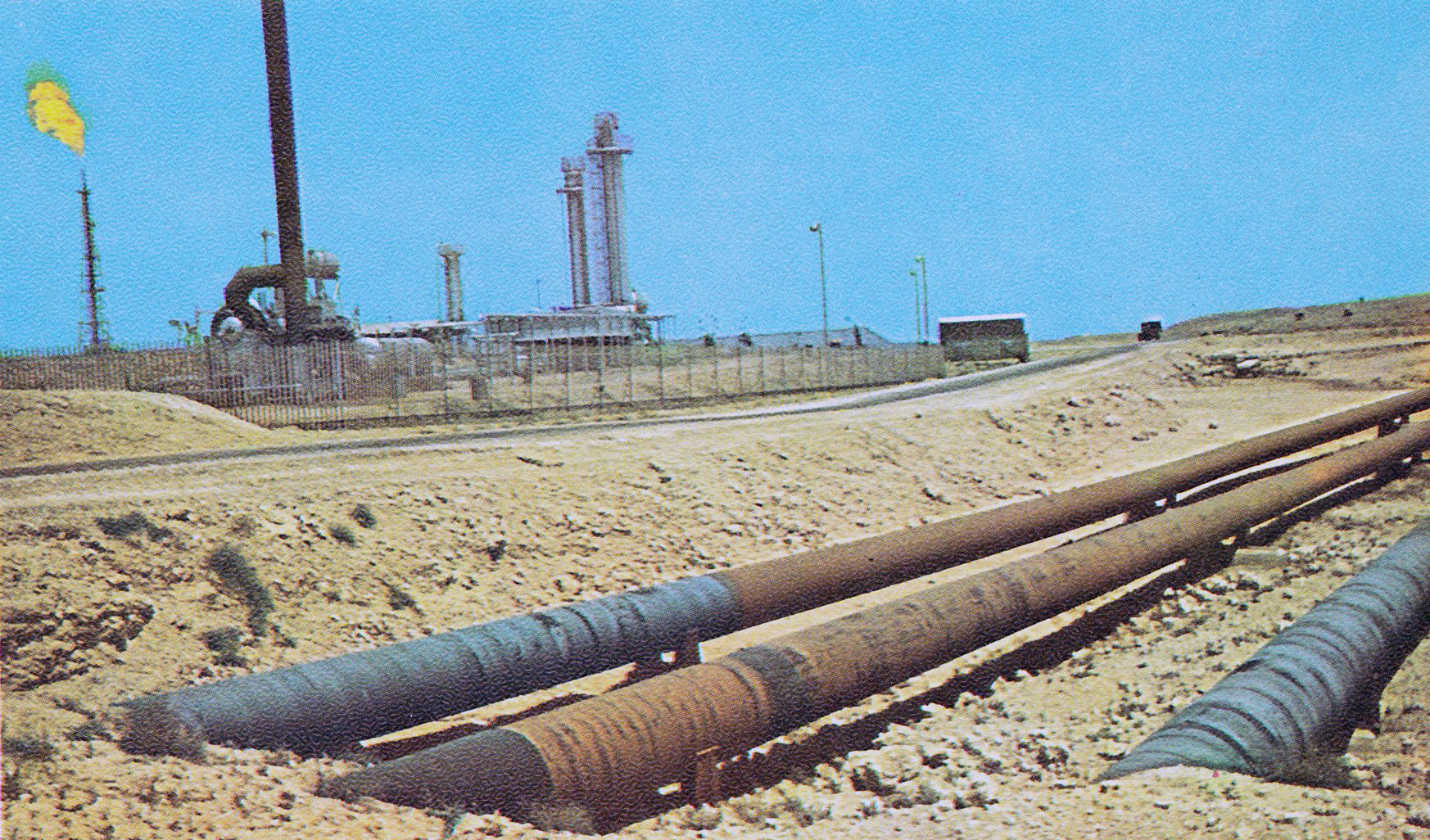
A gas flare and pipelines of Kharg Petrochemical Company

The Khark Petrochemical Company was established on Kharg Island in 1965, originally named the Khark Chemical Company. Its primary purpose was to recycle sour gas and various byproducts from Iranian offshore oil well gases, including propane, butane, naphtha, and sulfur. The company was founded as a 50/50 joint venture between NIOC and Amoco. An American company, J.E. Prichard, developed the initial engineering design for the operational units, while Chiyoda executed the construction and installation. Construction began in early 1967, and the facility was commissioned in 1969. Over time, the company expanded its operations to include methanol production, with its methanol plant. The construction of the methanol plant, designed by Lurgi AG, began in 1994. This factory was put into operation in 1999. The company was converted into a public company on September 11, 1996, and listed on the Tehran Stock Exchange on January 16, 1999, as "PKHA1".

== Products ==
The Kharg Petrochemical produces sulfur, propane, butane, pentane, and methanol by purifying sour gases extracted from the Iranian offshore oil wells.

== Sanctions ==
In 2022, the United States Treasury Department sanctioned Kharg, Marun, and Fanavaran petrochemical company in order to target the export of Iranian prochemical products.

== See also ==
- Kharg Island
- National Iranian Oil Company
