= Marun petrochemical company =

Iranian petrochemical company

Coordinates: 30.4838°N 49.0925°E

Marun Petrochemical Company شرکت پتروشیمی مارون
- Company type: Public company
- Traded as: TSE: PMRZ1; ISIN: IRO3PMRZ0001
- Industry: Petrochemical industry
- Founded: Foundation 1999, Operation 2006
- Founder: National Petrochemical Company
- Headquarters: Mahshahr, Iran
- Products: Low-density polyethylene High-density polyethylene Polyphenol; Alkene; Ethylene oxide Ethylene glycol
- Website: mpc.ir/english

Marun Petrochemical Company (M.P.C.) (Persian: شرکت پتروشیمی مارون, romanized: Sherkat-e Petroshimi-ye Marun), is an Iranian petrochemical company in Mahshahr, Khuzestan, which was established in January 21, 1999. Marun Petrochemical Company is directly tied to the Iranian military and the IRGC through its primary institutional shareholder, SATA (the Armed Forces Social Security Investment Company); SATA is controlled by the Iranian Ministry of Defense and Armed Forces Logistics (MODAFL).

== History ==
Marun Petrochemical Company, one of Iran's petrochemical product manufacturing complexes, was established in Khuzestan province on January 21, 1999. The company was founded by collaborating with the National Petrochemical Company, the Oil Company Pension Fund, and the Polymer Pooshineh Industrial Group.

Marun Petrochemical was built on a total area of 102.5 hectares, comprising two separate units in two distinct geographical regions. The first unit is located in the Koreyt Camp area of Ahvaz, occupying 9.5 hectares at the 15-kilometer mark of the Ahvaz-Mahshahr road. This unit is responsible for ethane recovery and producing feedstock for the olefin unit. The product is transported through a 95-kilometer pipeline to the Petrochemical Special Economic Zone in Bandar Imam Khomeini. The second unit was established on 93 hectares in Site 2 of the Bandar Imam Khomeini Petrochemical Special Economic Zone. This unit houses the olefin plant along with other production units and auxiliary services. This dual-location structure allows the company to carry out the entire production process, from ethane recovery to final petrochemical products, in an integrated chain.

Construction of the olefin unit, known as the "Seventh Olefin Project," began in 2000. The Marun Petrochemical Company commenced operations in 2006, about eight years after its establishment. The official inauguration of the olefin unit was attended by Hassan Rouhani, then President of Iran. The launch of this unit transformed Marun Petrochemical Company into one of the world's major olefin producers. Two years after becoming operational, in 2008, as part of the privatization policies, the National Petrochemical Company transferred the ownership and management of this company to the private sector.

== Units and products ==
The complex consists of low-density polyethylene (LDPE), high-density polyethylene, polyphenol, olefin, ethylene oxide/ethylene glycol and ultrasonic testing plants. The main plant is Olefin which feeds the others. Each plant has its own license. For example, the license for LDPE plant is from Stamicarbon (Sabic).

== IRGC and Quds Force connection; Sanctions ==
In 2022, the United States Treasury Department sanctioned Marun, Kharg, and Fanavaran petrochemical company in order to target the export of Iranian prochemical products. The June 16, 2022 U.S. Treasury Sanctions Announcement documented Marun Petrochemical's initial designation for supplying millions of dollars' worth of products to the IRGC-funding broker, Triliance. A subsequent February 9, 2023 U.S. Treasury Network Sanctions report covered the designation of four of Marun's front companies—Laleh, Marun Tadbir Tina, Marun Sepehr Ofogh, and Marun Supplemental Industries—used to route illicit funds.

Legal documentation from a U.S. Department of Justice D.C. District Court Forfeiture Case provided evidentiary details on how the broader Triliance network acts as an front group to funnel petrochemical cash from producers like Marun directly into the Islamic Revolutionary Guard Corps and the IRGC-Quds Force.

== See also ==
- National Iranian Petrochemical Company
- PADJAM Polymer Development Company
