= Aqueous Wastes from Petroleum and Petrochemical Plants =

1967 book by Milton R. Beychok

- Title page for Aqueous Wastes from Petroleum and Petrochemical Plants (1967)
- Author: Milton R. Beychok
- Language: English
- Subject: Industrial wastewaters
- Publisher: John Wiley and Sons
- Publication date: 1967
- Media type: Hardback
- Pages: 379
- OCLC: 566275

Aqueous Wastes from Petroleum and Petrochemical Plants is a book about the composition and treatment of the various wastewater streams produced in the hydrocarbon processing industries (i.e., oil refineries, petrochemical plants and natural gas processing plants). When it was published in 1967, it was the first book devoted to that subject.

The book is notable for being the first technical publication of a method for the rigorous tray-by-tray design of steam distillation towers for removing hydrogen sulfide from oil refinery wastewaters. Such towers are commonly referred to as sour water strippers. The design method was also presented at a World Petroleum Congress Meeting shortly after the book was published.

The subjects covered in the book include wastewater pollutants and the pertinent governmental regulations, oil refinery and petrochemical plant wastewater effluents, treatment methods, miscellaneous effluents, data on the cost of various wastewater treatment methods, and an extensive reference list.

== Availability in libraries ==
The book became a classic in its field and is available in major university, public and industrial libraries worldwide. The book has no ISBN because they were not in use in 1967. The Library of Congress catalog number (LCCN) is 67019834 and the British Library system number is 012759691. It is no longer in print, but photocopies can be obtained from the ProQuest Company's Books On Demand service.

== Book reviews ==
One of the book reviews is that of Dr. Nelson V. Nemerow, a Civil Engineering professor at Syracuse University in New York state, published in 1968 in the American Chemical Society's journal Environmental Science and Technology.
