= Arya Sasol polymer company =

Iranian petrochemical company

Arya Sasol polymer Company
- Company type: Subsidiary; TSE: Arya Sasol Polymer (APOZ1); ISIN: IRO3APOZ0002
- Industry: Petrochemical
- Founded: 2002
- Founder: National Petrochemical Company
- Headquarters: Asaluyeh, Iran
- Products: Chemicals
- Website: www.aryasasol.com

The Arya Sasol polymer Company, (Persian: شرکت پلیمر آریا ساسول) is an Iranian petrochemical company located in Asaluyeh, Iran. The establishment contract for this company was signed in April 2002 through a memorandum of understanding between the National Petrochemical Company of Iran and the German branch of Sasol, a South African company. According to this contract, it was decided that the olefin unit, as well as the two Low-density polyethylene, Medium-density, and heavy polyethylene units of Pars Petrochemical Company, would be separated and established as an independent company under the name Arya Sasol. The aim of this separation was for the new Arya Sasol company to become the best and leading polymer producer in the Middle East region. Arya Sasol's polymer is considered a legacy of the partnership between Iran and South Africa's Sasol in the early 2000s. The shares of this company are indexed on the Tehran Stock Exchange under the name "APOZ1".

== Products ==
Arya Sasol Polymer Company annually produces one million and one hundred thousand tons of ethylene in its olefin unit, 375 thousand tons of low-density polyethylene in its LDPE unit, and 375 thousand tons of medium and high-density polyethylene in its MDPE/HDPE unit.

== Awards ==
In the 5th Organization-Wide Innovation Award (2023), Arya Sasol was able to secure four top ranks for Iran and win the award.
