= Hossein Ali Khan-Sardar =

Iranian footballer

Hossein-Ali Khan Sardar
Personal information
- Full name: Hossein-Ali Khan Sardar
- Place of birth: Tehran, Iran
- Position: Goalkeeper

Senior career*
Years	Team	Apps	(Gls)
1920–?	Servette Geneva		
- Iran Club
- Tehran Club
- Toofan FC

International career
1920	Switzerland	1	(0)
1926–1929	Tehran XI	?	(0)

Managerial career
- 1940s: Toofan FC
- * Club domestic league appearances and goals

Hossein Ali Khan-Sardar (Persian: حسینعلی خان سردار) was an Iranian football player from the early 20th century. He was a goalkeeper during his playing career. He was born in Tehran, Iran.

== Playing career ==
=== Club career ===
He played his club football in Belgium whilst studying. In 1919 he returned to Iran from Belgium but his stay was short, as in 1920 he left for Switzerland and joined Servette Geneva where he played professional football. Upon his return from Europe he played for Toofan FC a club based in Tehran.

=== National career ===
Although Hossein-Ali Khan Sardar never played for the Iranian national team as it didn't get created until 1941, he was the captain of Tehran XI team that traveled to Baku, USSR in 1926 and also in 1929 when Tehran was host to Baku XI.

However, he has one cap to his name appearing in goal for Switzerland national football team as a substitute for the injured Swiss goalkeeper in a game against France national football team.

=== International caps ===
#	Date	Venue	Opponent	Result	Competition
1	29 February 1920	Stade des Charmilles, Geneva	France	0–2	Friendly

== Managerial career ==
He managed Toofan FC one of Iran's most popular football clubs during the 1940s.
