= Asia Petrochemical Industry Conference =

- Frequency: Annual
- Locations: India, Japan, Korea, Malaysia, Singapore, Taiwan, Thailand, Pakistan

The Asia Petrochemical Industry Conference (APIC) is an annual, international conference within the petrochemical industry intended to "spur mutual friendship and goodwill" within the industry with an aim to encouraging its "sound development". Known at its 1979 founding as the East Asia Petrochemical Industry Conference, it was a combined project of industry associations within Japan, Korea and Taiwan, which northern Asian nations alternated hosting duties. In 2000, the conference was retitled to its current name when India, Malaysia and Singapore entered the hosting rotation. Thailand is also currently among the conference's hosts. The 2009 conference hosted in Seoul was attended by over 850 officials from 28 countries. The 2010 conference was held on 13 and 14 May in Mumbai and attended by over 1400 delegates from 40 countries.
