= PADJAM Polymer Development Company =

Iranian polymer development company

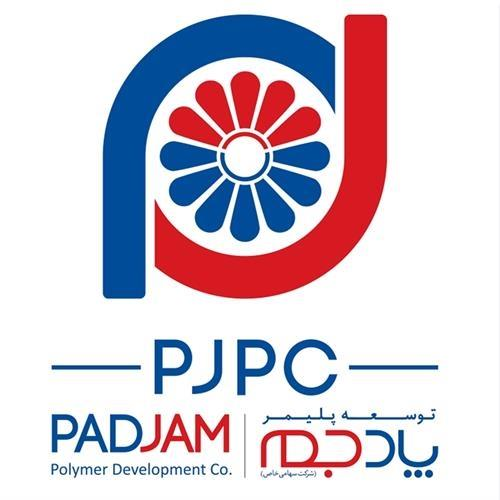
- Trade name: PADJAM Polymer Development Co. (PJPC)
- Native name: شرکت توسعه پلیمر پادجم
- Company type: Subsidiary
- Industry: Petrochemical industry
- Genre: Polymer Development
- Founded: 2015 in Bushehr, Iran
- Founder: Jam Petrochemical Company
- Headquarters: 35.746288°N 51.409388°E, Tehran, Iran
- Area served: Global
- Products: Chemical substances and Styrene products such as: GPPS (General Purpose Polystyrene); HIPS (High Impact Polystyrene); ABS (Acrylonitrile Butadiene Styrene); and: Rubber
- Services: Acrylonitrile Butadiene Styrene (ABS) production plan executive; Rubber production plan executive
- Owner: National and government
- Parent: Petropars Operation & Management Company (POMC); Jam Petrochemical Company; Civil Servants Pension Fund
- Website: www.pjpc.ir/en

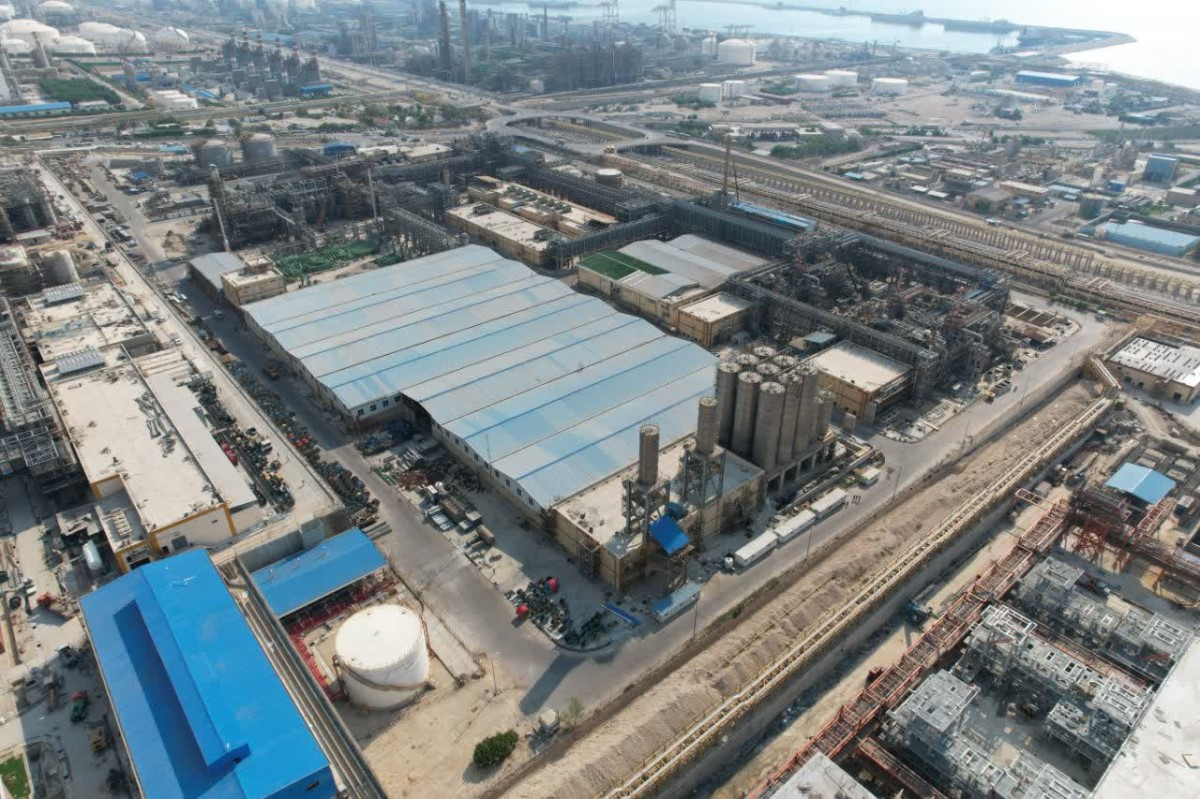
Aerial photo of the Bushehr Complex of PADJAM Polymer Development Company.

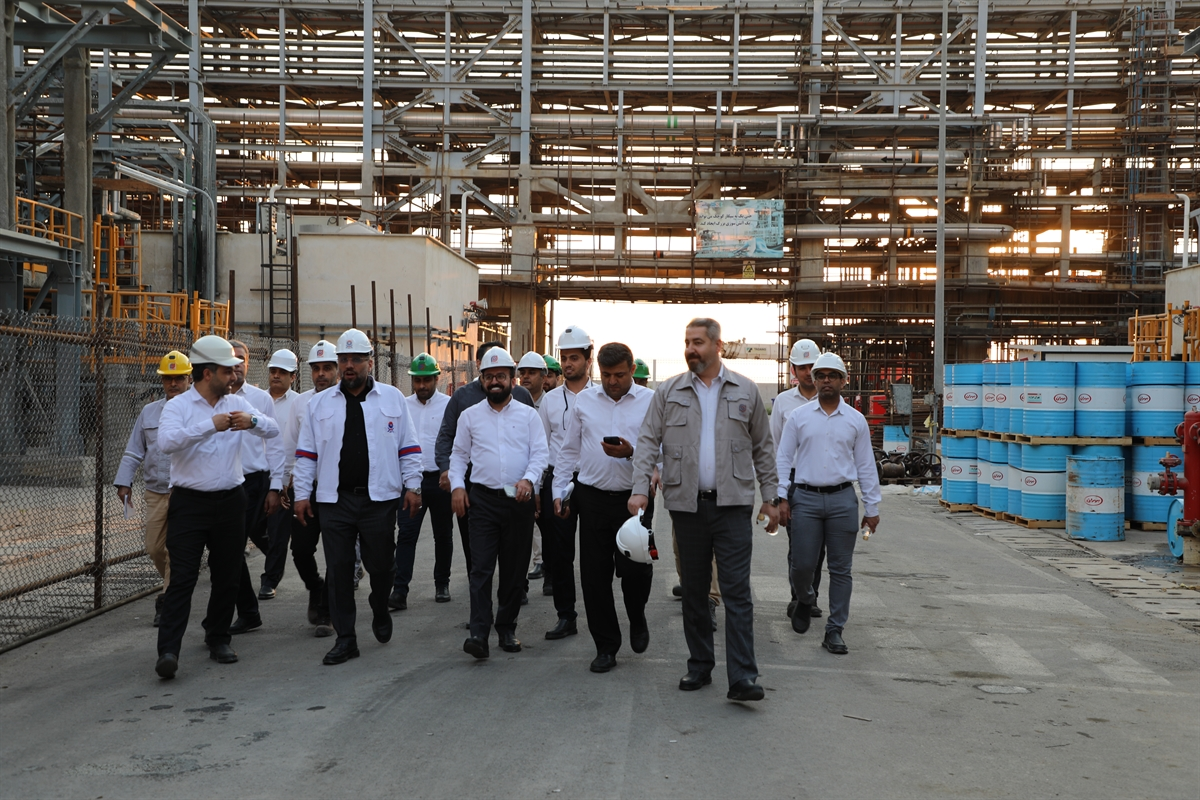
Jam Petrochemical CEO visits the preparation and launch of the second phase of PADJAM Polymer Development Company.

PADJAM Polymer Development Company (private joint stock) is a Polymer development company located in Bushehr, Iran. The company was established as the executive of the ABS/rubber production plan by Jam Petrochemical Company in 2015. The company is being built in the "Pars Special Economic Energy Zone" in port of Asaluyeh in Iran.

The company is built on a land area of 15 hectares. The production capacity of the company is 200,000 metric tons of ABS per year and 60,000 metric tons of rubber per year, under the license of the Italian company "Versalis-Eni S.p.A". The polymer production plan of the company received its basic engineering from Tecnimont Italian company. The polymer production plan is capable of producing 9 ABS grades and 3 Rubber products in 7 different grades. The company, which is a subsidiary of the Civil Servants Pension Fund, is the national project of the Ministry of Cooperatives, Labour, and Social Welfare of Iran.

== Location ==
The complex is built on a 15-hectare plot of land in "Phase 2" of the "Pars Energy Special Economic Zone (PSEEZ)" in the city of Asaluyeh in Iran.

== Production rate ==
The complex of the company can produce annually approximately 200,000 metric tons of ABS and approximately 60,000 metric tons of rubber.

== Products ==
The petrochemical compounds produced in this company are:

- F332
- E332
- L322
- F232
- B432/E
- B732/E
- D232/M3
- C442
- SOLT6302
- SOLT161B
- SOLT6306
- SOLB183
- InteneP30
- BR245
- BR277
- B532/E
- F332
- E332
- L322
- F232
- B432/E
- B732/E
- D232/M3
- C442
- SOLT6302
- SOLT161B
- SOLT6306
- SOLB183
- InteneP30
- BR245
- BR277
- B532/E

== See also ==
- Jam petrochemical company
- National Iranian Petrochemical Company
- Bandar Imam Petrochemical Company
- Marun petrochemical company
