= Persian Gulf Petrochemical Industries =

Iranian chemical company

- Trade name: فارس
- Traded as: Tehran Stock Exchange
- Headquarters: Tehran
- Key people: Mohammad Shariatmadari (CEO)
- Website: pgpic.ir

Persian Gulf Petrochemical Industries Corporation (PGPIC, Persian: شرکت صنایع پتروشیمی خلیج فارس, Sherkat-e Sanai'-ye Petrushimi-ye Xalij-e Fars) is an Iranian public holding company. it is mainly active in investment and administrating natural-gas processing plants, chemical factories, oil and polymer.

== History ==
It was built by National Petrochemical Company in 2011 with 800 billion Toman capital. It was the second most profitable Iranian company in 2015. It is the second biggest petrochemical company after SABIC in the middle east. The company generated a total of 1.2 billion dollars in revenue over the first three months (Q1) in 2018.

US Treasury sanctioned PGPIC for aiding Khatam al-Anbiya Construction Headquarters in 2019.

In 2019 it was the 35th in ICIS top 100 chemical companies list.
