= Iran Club =

- Full name: Iran Club
- Founded: 1920
- Dissolved: 1926
Home colours	Away colours

Iran Club (Persian: کلوپ ایران) was an Iranian football club based in Tehran, Iran. It was Iran's first football club and predecessor to Tehran Club. In 1923 all players moved to newly established Tehran Club.

== Honours ==
Tehran Annual Football Association Cup:

- Runner–up: 1922
- Champion: 1926
