= Armenian Sports Club =

- Full name: Armenian Sports Club
- Founded: 1922
Home colours	Away colours

Armenian Sports Club (Persian: کلوب اسپرت ارامنه) was an Iranian football club based in Tehran, Iran. It was Iran's first sport club for Iranian-Armenians. It is not known exactly when the sport club ceased to exist, but it can be assumed that it was sometime in the 1930s as, in 1944, Ararat Tehran was established and became the sport club for Iranian-Armenians.

== Managers ==
The team was managed for many years by Victor Aboyan, an Armenian engineer, fond of football, who came to Iran in 1938 from Tbilisi, Georgia.
