= Imam Khomeini Port Special Economic Zone =

Port and Special Economic Zone in Iran

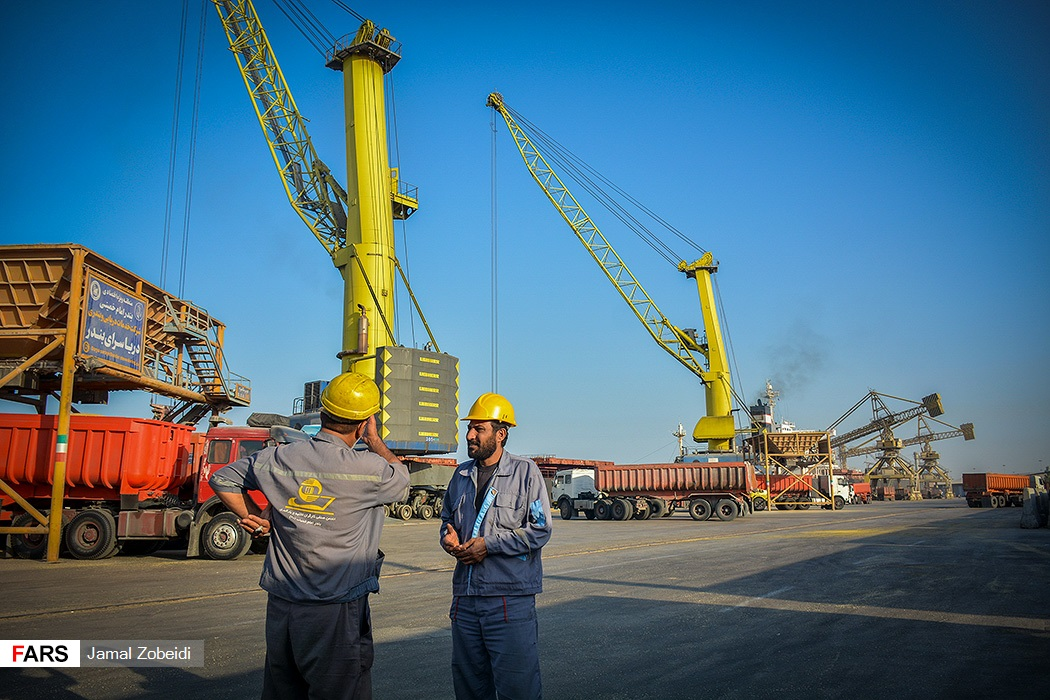
- Interactive map of Imam Khomeini Port Special Economic Zone
- Location in Iran

Location
- Country: Iran
- Location: Mahshahr, khozestan
- Coordinates: 30.4386667°N 49.0763780°E
- UN/LOCODE: IRAMP

Details
- Opened: April 2001
- Operated by: Port & Maritime Organization of Iran|Port & Maritime Organization
- No. of berths: 34
- General Manager: Behroz Aghaei

Statistics
- Website bikport.pmo.ir

Imam Khomeini Port Special Economic Zone is an industrial and commercial zone in Bandar-e Emam Khomeyni District of Mahshahr County, Khuzestan province.

== History ==
After changing its legal regime from a normal industrial town to a special economic zone in 1390, this port industrial complex was transformed into a special economic zone and the annexation of adjacent lands, and now with an area of more than 11 thousand hectares, it forms the largest special economic zone in the country. The special economic zone of Imam Khomeini Port (RA) with an area of 11044 hectares is located in the northwest of the Persian Gulf and at the end of the Khor Musa waterway.
