= Hossein Sadaghiani =

Iranian footballer and manager

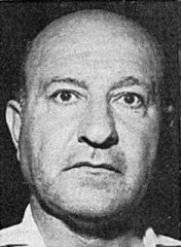

Personal information
- Full name: Amir Hossein Sadaghiani امیرحسین صدقیانی
- Date of birth: January 1, 1903
- Place of birth: Salmas, Qajar Iran
- Date of death: December 1, 1982 (aged 79)
- Place of death: Tehran, Iran
- Position: Striker

Youth career
- 1920–1923: Fenerbahçe
- 1923–1924: Rapid Vienna

Senior career*
Years	Team	Apps	(Gls)
1924–1925	Ferdowsi Club		
1929–1930	CS Marchienne-Monceau		
1930–1932	Charleroi	42	(28)
1932–1933	Fenerbahçe		
1933–1934	Charleroi	9	(7)
1934–1935	Moignelée		
1935–1936	Peruwelz		
1937–1939	Toofan		

International career
1926	Tehran XI	4	

Managerial career
- 1941–1951: Iran
- 1945–1964: University of Tehran
- * Club domestic league appearances and goals

Dr. Amir Hossein Sadaghiani (Persian: امیرحسین صدقیانی; 1 January 1903 – 1 December 1982) was an Iranian football player and manager. He was a striker during his playing career and afterwards was Iran national football team's head coach from 1941 till 1950.

== Playing career ==
=== Club career ===
Dr. Sadaghiani is the first ever Iranian soccer player to play abroad in a European league. He played for youth teams of Fenerbahçe and Rapid Wien then returned to Iran and established Ferdowsi Club in Mashhad, but his stay was short as he returned to Tehran a year later.

At 26, he moved Europe to study in Belgium. He arrived at the Université du travail de Charleroi in 1929. He joined CS Marchienne-Monceau, a provincial second division team. He proved to be a very gifted player so he made his mark in Belgium's second Division (1930-1932) and third division (1932-1933) playing for R. Charleroi S.C. for two successful seasons.

In the 1930s, his premature baldness earned him the nickname of "Panne de verre", a walloon folklore expression used for bald people.

After Charleroi, he moved to Turkey for a year with Fenerbahçe then back to Belgium after 1.5 years where he played in Division III back by Charleroi SC and lower level. In 1936 he left Belgium and finished his football career with Toofan in Tehran.

=== National career ===
Although Sadaghiani never played for the Iranian national team as it was not created until 1941, he has 4 caps to his name when in 1926 he played for a Tehran XI team that traveled to Baku, USSR. Tehran XI lost three games and drew one.

== Managerial career ==
- Head Coach of Iran national football team 1941–1950
- Head Coach of the University of Tehran's Soccer Team 1945–1964
