= Tehran Club =

- Full name: Tehran Club
- Founded: 1923
- Capacity: Bijan Taheri
Home colours	Away colours

Tehran Club (Persian: کلوپ تهران) was an Iranian football club based in Tehran, Iran. It was the successor to Iran first football club Iran Club.

== Honours ==
Tehran Annual Football Association Cup:

- Champion: 1925
