= National Petrochemical Company =

Iranian chemical company

National Iranian Petrochemical Company (NIPC)
- Type: State-owned company
- Industry: Chemicals
- Founded: 1964; 62 years ago
- Headquarters: Tehran, Iran
- Key people: Omid Shakeri, Chief Executive Officer; Hamid Bovard, Chairman
- Products: Chemicals and intermediates, industrial polymers, fertilizers and metals
- Revenue: $20.4 billion USD (2015)
- Number of employees: 37,000 (2015)
- Website: www.nipc.ir

The National Petrochemical Company (NPC) (Persian: شرکت ملی صنایع پتروشیمی, Sherkat-e Melli-ye Sanāye'-e Petroshimi), a subsidiary to the Iranian Petroleum Ministry, is owned by the government of the Islamic Republic of Iran. It is responsible for the development and operation of the country's petrochemical sector. Founded in 1964, NPC began its activities by operating a small fertilizer plant in Shiraz.

Two special economic zones on the northern coast of the Persian Gulf have been developed to be home to the NPC's new project. These two zones enjoy a good access to feedstock, infrastructural facilities, local and international markets and skilled manpower. The Fourth Five-Year Plan (2005–10) calls for a fourfold expansion of petrochemical output, to 56 million tons per year.

On 26 October 2020, the US Department of the Treasury sanctioned NPC on the grounds that it was owned or controlled by Iran's Ministry of Petroleum. The designation subjected the company to asset-blocking measures and secondary sanctions. As of November 2026, NPC remains on the US Treasury's Specially Designated Nationals List.

== History ==
Iran petrochemical industry dates back to 1963. The first petrochemical complex to produce fertilizer kicked off then. It was founded by Bagher Mostofi باقر مستوفی under instructions of Shah.

Prior to the Iranian revolution, the first major petrochemical operation in Iran was the Shiraz Petrochemical Complex which by 1979 would have had facilities that would have increased annual production capacity of urea by 500,000 tons, nitric acid by 200,000 tons and ammonia nitrate by 250,000 tons, while the largest petrochemical plant in Iran prior to the revolution was the Abadan Petrochemical Plant which by 1976 produced in excess of 100,000 tons of PVC, 12,000 tons of dodecylbenzene and 24,000 tons of sodium hydroxide. Iran had surpassed a production of 5 million tons of hydrocarbon energy, worth billions to the Iranian economy and employing tens of thousands of domestic and foreign workers. The Iranian government in 1977 estimated that by 1985 Iran would supply 10% of the entire world's petrochemical production.

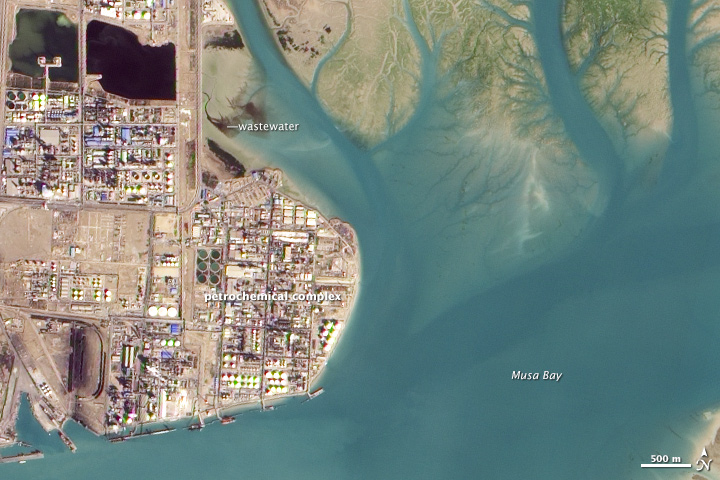
Bandar Imam Khomeini Petrochemical Complex.

Other large ventures planned prior to the revolution included a second trans Iranian-Soviet pipeline for natural gas named Igat-2 valued at 2 billion, an addition of a methanol production facility at the Kharg Petrochemical Company (a joint venture with Amoco) known for producing over 250,000 tons of sulfur a year and the Iran Carbon Company (a joint venture with the Cabot Corporation) the largest black carbon and rubber producer in the Middle East.

The largest petrochemical and fertilizer plant in the world, a joint venture between the government of Iran and Japanese conglomerate Mitsui was to be constructed in the city of Bandar e-Shahpur, alongside the Persian Gulf. By 1979 the complex was half completed and was slated at a cost of US$3.2 billion (1979 dollars). The plant manager was to be M. Arvin who formerly managed the Shiraz and Abadan plants.

Due to getting involved in Iran–Iraq War, Iran oil industry development experienced the lowest growth rate from 1979 till 1989. In 1989 the country petrochemical products reached 2.4 million tons a year.

Since 1989 till 1999 petrochemical industry started to reconstruct. Isfahan, Arak, Khorasan, Orumiyeh and Tabriz Petrochemical complexes were constructed and Bandar Imam Petrochemical Complex was also developed.

The fourth period (2006–2011) – called stabilizing and sudden growth period – started in 1999 and has been continued till now. The number of petrochemical facilities rose to 39 in the post-Islamic Revolution era from only 6 in 1978, raising the output to 15.8 million tons in 2005 and more than 40 million tons in 2010.

In 2016, Iran's petrochemical industry experienced at least 15 accidents, possibly linked to cyber-attacks.

== Main activities ==
Following the implementation of Article 44 of the Iranian Constitution, which provided for the privatisation of state-owned enterprises, the company shifted from operating as a commercial enterprise towards functioning as a development and coordinating organisation for the petrochemical industry.

NPC's major activities are production, sale, distribution and export of chemicals and petrochemicals. In 2010, Iran produced 26% of the total petrochemical output in the Middle East, second behind Saudi Arabia. The petrochemical industry accounts for 2 percent of the GDP, 44 percent of the non-oil exports and 55 percent of the industrial exports. In 2011, Iran earned 12 billion dollars from exporting petrochemical products to over 60 countries.

National Petrochemical Company (Quantity: thousand tons / Value: million USD)
Product	Domestic sale - Quantity/Value (2003)	Exports - Quantity/Value (2003)
Chemicals	749 thousand tons/ $232 million	804 thousand tons/ $217 million
Fertilizers	896 thousand tons/ $99 million	2069 thousand tons/ $138 million
Polymers	105 thousand tons/ $76 million	842 thousand tons/ $555 million
Aromatics	335 thousand tons/ $172 million	167 thousand tons/ $73 million
Fuel & hydrocarbons	2459 thousand tons/ $646 million	683 thousand tons/ $140 million
Total:	4544 thousand tons / $1225 million	4565 thousand tons / $1123 million

=== Main products ===
Iran has a diversified petroleum product basket with more than 70 products. The main exports are polyethylene, methanol, benzene, ammonia, sulphur, PVC and propylene. Iran exported $8.613 billion worth of different types of petrochemical products in Iranian year 2010-2011.

Methanol: Iran is a key player in supplying the world's methanol demand. Currently, Iran has the capacity to produce more than 5 million tonnes of methanol, which constitutes 10% of the world's methanol production. Of this amount, approximately 90% is exported.

Ethane: In addition, Iran has a competitive advantage in the gas consuming stream of the petrochemical industry due to its vast reserves of natural gas. In the Assalouyeh region near the South Pars gas field in the Persian Gulf, Iran is able to convert raw gas to ethane (a raw material for the petrochemical industry) and then to petrochemical products at a gross margin of up to 88%. In 2009, Iran consumed domestically over 95% of the natural gas that was produced.

== Expansion of the petrochemical industry ==
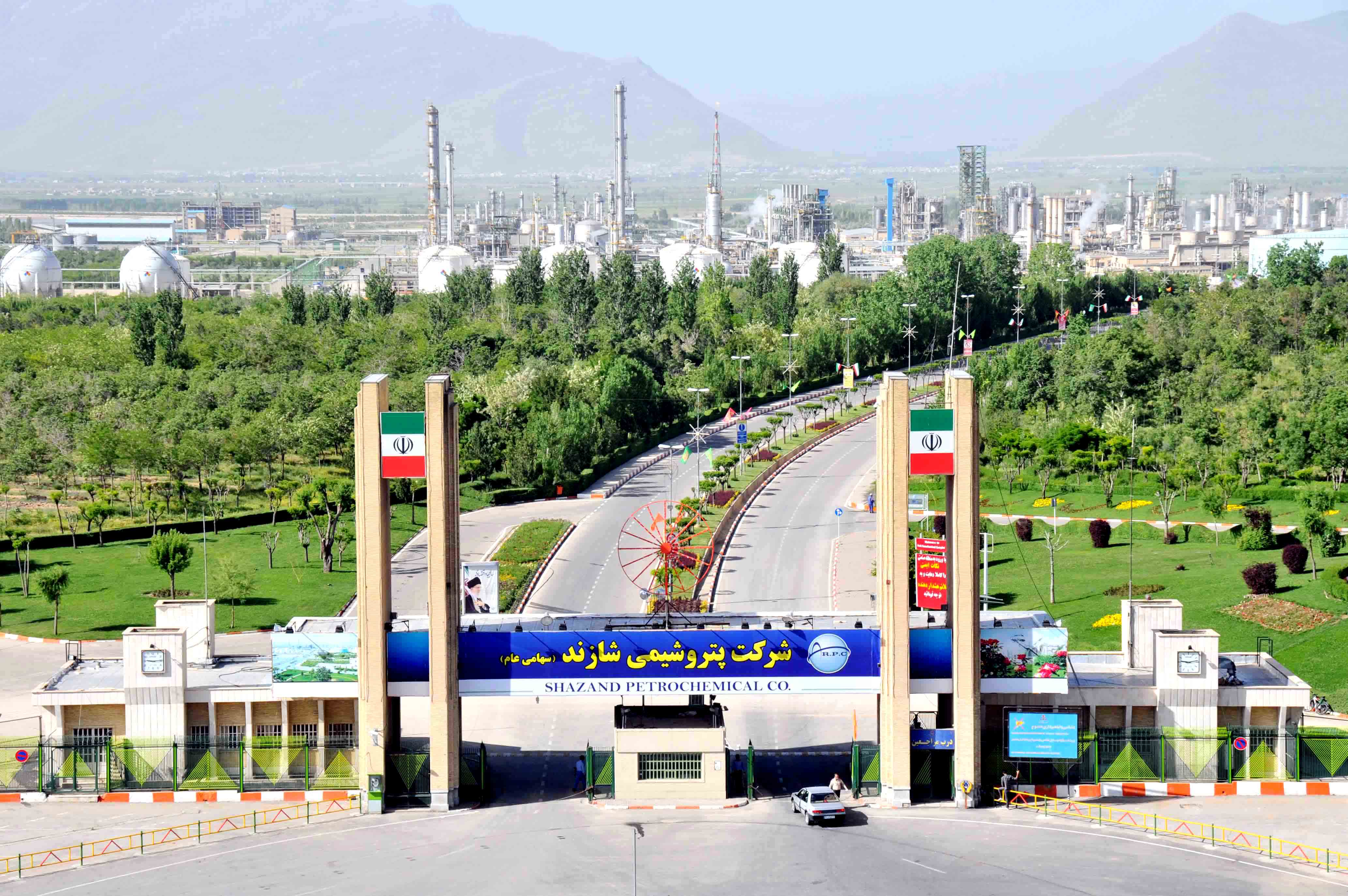
Arak Petrochemical Complex.

In 1989 the Planning and Development Department of NPC initiated, with the help of other related institutions and individuals, a long-term study on the "Strategic Plan for the Development of the Petrochemical Industry in Iran". Considering national and international factors such as the local market, export potentials, feedstock availability and profitability, a 25-year development plan, consisting of five development phases, was drawn up.

Business Monitor International (BMI) estimates that in 2009, Iranian petrochemicals exports will be around $7.9 billion, 32 percent above the previous year. Iran hopes to implement 47 new petrochemical projects by the end of the Fifth Five-Year Economic Development Plan in 2015 at a cost of $25 billion, adding a total of 43 million tons per annum (tpa) to the capacity. Iran will represent at least 5.3 percent of global petrochemical output and 36 percent of Middle Eastern production once those projects become online. The Ministry of Petroleum of Iran has set targets for annual production of 11.5 million tpa of ethylene, 11.5 million tpa of polymer and 3.4 million tpa of urea, with a target of becoming the world's leading producer of methanol with 7.5 million tpa of methanol capacity, which represents 18 percent of global capacity.

Iran National Petrochemical Company's output capacity will increase to over 100 million tpa by 2015 from an estimated 50 million tpa in 2010 thus becoming the world' second largest chemical producer globally after Dow Chemical with Iran housing some of the world's largest chemical complexes. 50 billion dollars will be invested during the fifth five-year development plan (2011–2016) to create this new capacity.

Projects due to be completed by 2016, such as the 14th olefins complex in Firouzabad with 1mn tpa ethylene capacity, the 15th olefins complex in Genaveh with 500,000tpa of ethylene and the 17th olefins complex in Ilam with 607,000tpa of ethylene, were significantly delayed under the sanctions regime. Meanwhile, the 12th olefins complex has been postponed and will be configured. However, the 16th olefins and methanol complex is already being constructed by Bushehr Petrochemical Company as part of phase two of the Pars SEZ at Assaluyeh. Completion of the plants, with capacity for 1mn tpa ethylene and 1.65mn tpa methanol, is due in 2014, although past experience has shown that delays could push commercial production back.

=== Research and development ===
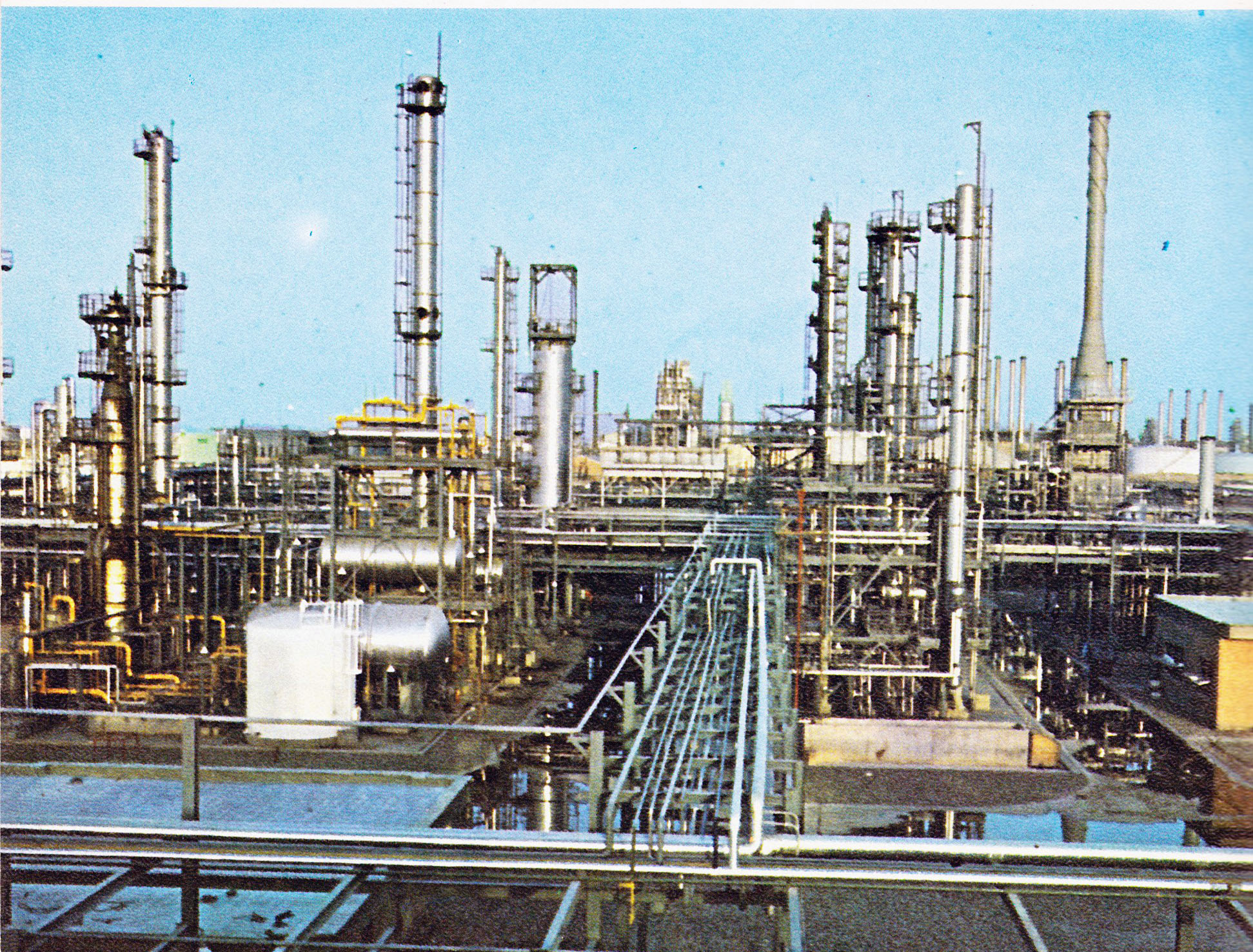
The Abadan Petrochemical Complex.

There are essentially four locations where R&D in the area of petrochemicals are conducted:

1. Universities;
2. Research Institute of Petroleum Industry (RIPI);
3. The Petrochemical Research and Technology Company;
4. R&D departments internal to the petrochemical complexes.

NPC is investing more on its R&D activities: this includes carrying out joint research projects with local institutions and universities; systematic link with local and foreign research centers; and design and operation of pilot plants for research purposes. As fo 2011, Iran is highly dependent on foreign expertise in the petrochemical sector, Germany holds a 35 per cent share in Iran's petrochemical production (i.e. licenses). UK, France and the Netherlands rank the next with 18 per cent share, 12 per cent share and 11 per cent share, respectively.

As of 2012, self-sufficiency in manufacturing and repairing rotating equipment and providing catalysts are the main challenges of the petrochemical industry in Iran. Domestic production of 52 petrochemical catalysts will be started in 2013 onward. 70 percent of the equipment used in the petrochemical sector is produced by domestic manufacturers.

== Privatization ==
Local and foreign, is essential for sustained growth of the petrochemical industry in Iran. Policies for encouragement of private sector participation include allocating NPC shares to private sector both inside and outside of Iran; supporting local private sector investments in the petrochemical industry; supporting local engineering firms and production companies; allocating parts of engineering, and most of construction jobs, to the local private sector; and allowing the private sector to invest in new projects in the petrochemical industry.

NPC plans to privatize 17 subsidiary companies by the end of 2007. All shares of domestic petrochemical firms will be offered to the public in the frame of a holding company by the end of 2010.

== NPC affiliate companies ==
Company	Location	Year founded	Employees	Production (as of 2009)	Costs	Remarks
Khorasan Petrochemical Co.	Khorasan	1996		fertilizers including urea, ammonia and crystal melamine		privatized co.
Tabriz Petrochemical Co.	Tabriz	1989	978	petrochemicals including ethylene and propylene	new projects: $35 million	
Isfahan Petrochemical Co.	Isfahan					privatized co.
Arak Petrochemical Co.	Arak	1984	3,825	petrochemicals including ethylene and polyethylene		One of the largest privatized co. on TSE Affiliate companies: Bakhtar - Andimeshk, Chahar Mahal Bakhtiari, Gachsaran, Hamedan, Kermanshah, Kordestan, Lorestan, Mahabad, Mamasani, Miandoab, Kavian, Dehdasht.
Kharg Petrochemical Co.	Kharg					One of the largest privatized co. on TSE
Shiraz Petrochemical Co.	Shiraz	1959	2,261	fertilizers including urea, ammonia and methanol		affiliate: Kermanshah petrochemical co.
Razi Petrochemical Co.	near Bandar Imam and Petzone	1968	2,100	fertilizers including ammonia, urea, phosphoric acid and sulphuric acid		Linked to Iran's nuclear and missile programs. Privatized co. As of 2008, owned by a Turkish consortium.
Orumiyeh Petrochemical Co.	Orumiyeh	1995		petrochemicals including crystal melamine, ammonium sulphate and ammonium carbonate		privatized co.
Bandar Imam Petrochemical Co. (formerly known as "Iran Japan Petrochemical Co.")	Bandar Imam (Petzone)	1973		production and marketing of fuel and petrochemicals including aromatics, polymers and chemicals: 443,000 tons of ethane; 365,000 tons pentane; 284,000 tons hexane plus; 688,000 tones butane; 35,000 tones fuel gas; 870,000 tons propane. (2012)		affiliates: Ab Niroo, Basparan, Faravaresh, Kharazmi, Kimia. One of Iran's top 100 companies.
NIPC International Co.						
Petrochemical Commercial Co. (PCC)				sales of petrochemical products in the international markets as well as supplying Iran's petrochemical downstream industries. In 2011-12, PCC accounted for almost 90% of Iran's total petrochemical production of 46-47 million tons and almost the same share of Iran's petrochemical exports of 18-19 million tons.		subsidiaries in England, Germany (Intra-Chem Trading Co.), China, Singapore, India, U.A.E, South Korea and Turkey.
Bu-Ali Sina	Bandar Imam (Petzone)			benzene, paraxylene, orthoxylene, light ends, raffinate, LPG, pentene, heavy aromatics and naphtha		one of the biggest petrochemical plant in Iran.
Arvand Petrochemical Complex	Bandar Imam (Petzone)	2010		300,000 tons of polyvinyl chloride (PVC), 660,000 tons of caustic soda, 340,000 tons of vinyl chloride and 890,000 tons of ethylene dichloride, color alkali (2.834 million tpy)	$1.612 billion	8th olefin project. Arvand is the largest polyvinyl chloride (PVC) producer in the world. Bandar Imam Khomeini, Abadan and Qadir are the three other petrochemical complexes producing PVC in Iran with an aggregate production capacity of over 405 thousand tons per year.
Shahid Tondguyan Petrochemical Co.	Bandar Imam (Petzone)	1998		PTA, PET-F (bottle grade), PET-G (fiber grade), PET (staple grade), PET (POY grade)		One of the largest companies in Iran.
Khuzestan Petrochemical Co.	Bandar Imam (Petzone)	1997		liquid epoxy resin, solid epoxy resin, polycarbonates		
Non-Basic Services Co.				services		
Fajr Petrochemical Co. (Phase. 1)	Bandar Imam (Petzone)	1999		electricity, steam, nitrogen, oxygene, air, aragon, various waters		utilities required by the process plants in the Petzone.
Kermanshah Petrochemical Co.	Kermanshah	1986		ammonia, urea		
Bisootun	Bisootun in Kermanshah	1999		LAB, HAB		
Jam Petrochemical Complex	Assaluyeh (PSEEZ)			etylene: 1.320 million metric tpy to be increased to 4.2 million in few years, butadiene (115K tpy). The complex also includes a light polyethylene unit with annual production of 300,000 tons, a poly-propylene unit (with production of 300,000 tons per annum), an ethylene glycol unit (443,000 tons) and heavy polyethylene (300,000 tons).	new projects: $148 million	10th olefin. World's largest ethylene unit. Privatized co. Certification: ISO-9001:2000, OHSAS-18001:1999, ISO-14001:2004, IMS.
Zagros Petrochemical Complex	Assaluyeh (PSEEZ)	2004		methanol (1.650 million tpy)	$341 million	Participation of Ghadir Investment Company (Ghadir Urea) in 4th & 6th Olefin. Privatized co. Zagros Petrochemical is the world's largest methanol producer. As of 2011, it had a production capacity of 3.3 million tonnes per annum.
Pars Petrochemical Complex	Assaluyeh (PSEEZ)	1998		include ethane, propane, butane, gasoline, ethylene benzene and styrene monomer (1.245 million tpy)	$535 million	participation in Aryasasol. The styrene monomer plant in Pars Petrochemical complex is the largest such plant in the world which produces 600,000 tons of this product annually. Privatized company. Major shareholder as of 2010: Armed Forces Pension Fund (SATA)
Mehr Petrochemical Plant	Assaluyeh (PSEEZ)			petrochemicals including HDPE (300K tpy)	$231 million	partner: Japan.
Marun Petrochemical Complex	Bandar Imam (Petzone)			petrochemicals including low-density polyethylene and olefin. Oxygen and nitrogen production line inaugurated in 2012.		affiliate: Laleh (LDPE project) - under implementation. Privatized company. Major shareholder as of 2010: Armed Forces Pension Fund (SATA)
Arya Sasol Polymer Co.	Assaluyeh (PSEEZ)	2009		400,000 tons of ethylene, 90,000 tons of C3 cut, 300,000 tons of medium and heavy polyethylene, and 300,000 tons of light polyethylene	$3.5 billion	9th olefin. Partner: South Africa (Sasol). Privatized co.
Nouri (Borzouyeh) Petrochemical Complex	Assaluyeh (PSEEZ)	1999	380	4.5 million tons of petrochemicals, including benzene, liquefied petroleum gas, raffinate, heavy aromatics (2.5 million tpy), orthoxylene and paraxylene		world's largest aromatics producing complex.
Fanavaran Petrochemical Co.	Bandar Imam (Petzone)	1998		1 million tons of methanol per year, 140,000 tons of carbon		privatized. Methanol to project [MTP] - vinyl acetate monomer project [VAM]. Fanavaran Petrochemical, Iran's second largest methanol producer, was the first to be privatised.
Abadan Petrochemical Co.	Abadan	1966		PVC, caustic soda, DDB		privatized co. See also Abadan Refinery
Polica Nowin Industrial Polymers Co.	Karaj	2003		pipe, soft granule, joints & fittings, mixed powder		privatized co.
Farabi Petrochemical Co.	Bandar Imam (Petzone)	1973		dioctyle phetalat (DOP), phthalic anhydride (PA)		privatized co.
Iran-Carbon	Ahwaz	1974		industrial coke		privatized co. Certification: ISO-14001: 2004, ISO-9001: 2000.
Petrochemical Development & Management Co.				services		
Rahavaran Fonoon Petrochemical company	near Bandar Imam and Petzone	1998		educational and training services		

== Foreign investment ==
In accordance with the government policy on rapid development of the petrochemical industry, many steps have been taken to make foreign investments in this industry more attractive for future joint-venture partners. Such actions include creation of special industrial economic zones, revision of legal to taxes and tariffs, guarantee of capital and profit transfer, and providing the required utilities and the needed infrastructure for industrial and commercial operations. The availability of a highly trained but inexpensive work-force, cheap feedstocks and a sizable internal market, will also work in Iran's favor, to attract foreign investment. In 2008, Iran agreed to invest $125 million in the Philippines’ petrochemical market.

=== Special industrial economic zones ===
As of 2010, the most important Petrochemical projects in the Pars Special Economic Energy Zone are: 9th Olefin, 10th Olefin, 4th Methanol, 4th Urea and Ammonia, Ethane recovery, Styrene Monomer and Polystyrene, Petrochemical Port, centralized utilities, 6th Methanol and DME. 11th Olefin, 12th Olefin, 6th Urea and Ammonia, 8th Urea and Ammonia and HDP Assaluyeh.

== Petrochemical Exporting Countries Forum (PECF) ==
Iran has proposed the creation of a Petrochemical Exporting Countries Forum (PECF) which aims at financial and technological cooperation among members, as well as product pricing and policy making in production issues.

== See also ==
- List of Iranian Research Centers (Polymers)
- The nationalization of the Iran oil industry movement
- PADJAM Polymer Development Company
