= Petrochemical industry =

Industry of petroleum products

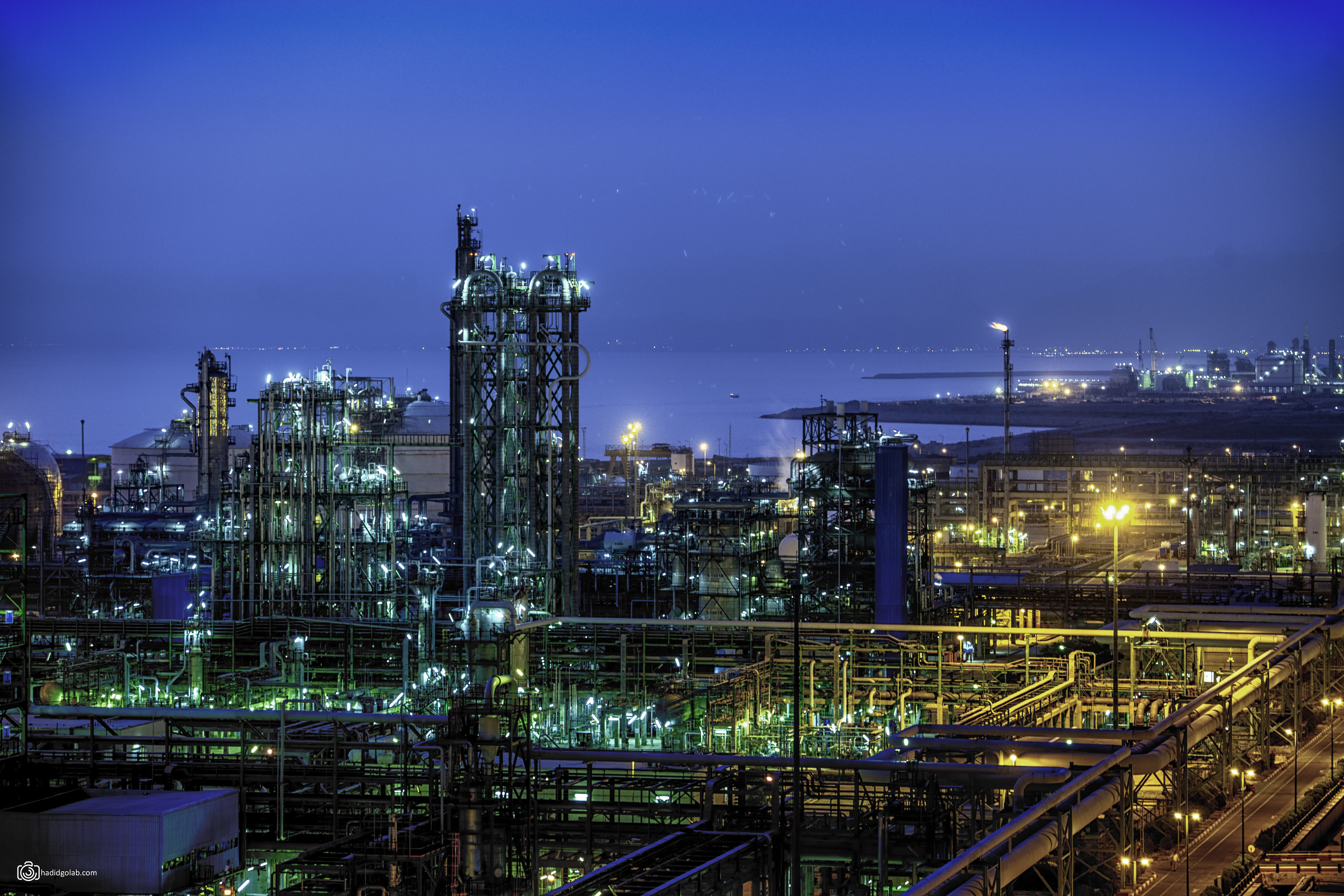
Jampilen Petrochemical co., Asaluyeh, Iran

The petrochemical industry produces and trades in petrochemicals. A major component is the plastics industry. It directly interfaces with the petroleum industry, especially its downstream sector.

Top companies in the industry include China National Petroleum Corp, Saudi Arabian Oil Company, and ExxonMobil.

== Companies ==
The top global petrochemical companies based on different KPIs:

Company	Country	2008 revenues $ (billion)	2021 annual revenue $ (million)	2023 market cap $ (billion)
BASF	Germany	62.30		51.1
Dow Chemical	US	57.51		
ExxonMobil Chemical / ExxonMobil	US	55	398.6	466.8
LyondellBasell Industries	Netherlands	51		
Ineos	UK	47		
SABIC	Saudi Arabia	37.66		
Formosa Plastics Corporation	Taiwan	31.5		
Sumitomo Chemical	Japan	16.65		
DuPont	US	31.83		
Chevron Phillips / Chevron Corp	US	13	235.7	349.8
Saudi Arabian Oil Company	Saudi Arabia		605.1	1900
China National Petroleum Corp Petrochina Co. Ltd.	CN		505.3	425.8
Sinochem Holdings	CN		258.3	
Shell plc	CN		381.3	205.6
China Petroleum & Chemical Corp	CN		493.1	77.2
TotalEnergies SE	FR		263.3	157.9
BP plc	FR		241.3	107.1
Marathon Petroleum Corp	US		178.8	58.9
Valero Energy	US		176.3	55
Reliance Industries Limited	IN			202.4

== Countries and sites ==
- Marun petrochemical complex

== Conferences ==
- Asia Petrochemical Industry Conference
- International Petrochemical Conference by the AFPM

== Associations ==
- American Fuel and Petrochemical Manufacturers (AFPM)
- European Petrochemical Association (EPCA)
- Gulf Petrochemicals and Chemicals Association (GPCA)
- Petrochemicals Europe (industry sector of Cefic)

== Awards ==
- Medal "For the Tapping of the Subsoil and Expansion of the Petrochemical Complex of Western Siberia"
- Petrochemical Heritage Award

== See also ==
- Aqueous Wastes from Petroleum and Petrochemical Plants
