= List of Iranian Armenians =

This is a list of Iranian Armenian notable people by birth or ancestry, ethnicity or nationality, arranged by main profession then birthdate. For similar reasons related to ethnogenesis and national identity, this list starts from the early modern history of Armenia and Iran, when the Safavids established Iranian Armenia (1502–1828) and a national state officially known as Persia or Iran and reasserted the Iranian identity of the region. (Note: see:Safavid Iran)

This list is not automatically filled but the following Iranian people have either stated that they are Armenians or that credible sources indicate that. To be included in this list, the person must have a Wikipedia article and references showing the person is Armenian and Iranian.

== Arts and entertainment ==
=== Music ===
==== Composers ====
- Aram Gharabekian – (4 July 1955, Tehran – 10 January 2014, Los Angeles) conductor.

==== Singers ====
- Hovhannes Badalyan – (15 December 1924, Shavarin – 19 August 2001, Yerevan) singer.
- Viguen – (23 November 1929, Hamadan – 26 October 2003, Los Angeles) singer and actor.
- Andy – (22 April 1958, Tehran) singer-songwriter and actor; Iranian Armenian-Armenian.
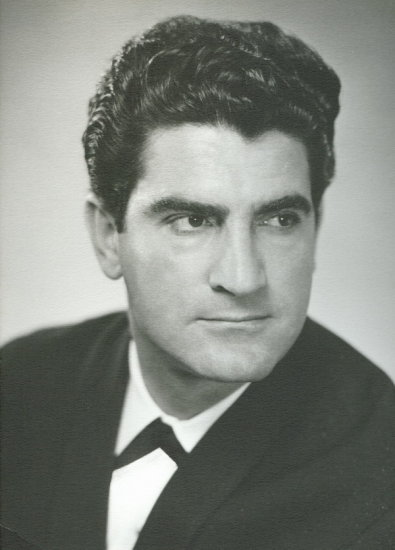
Vigen
(1929–2003)

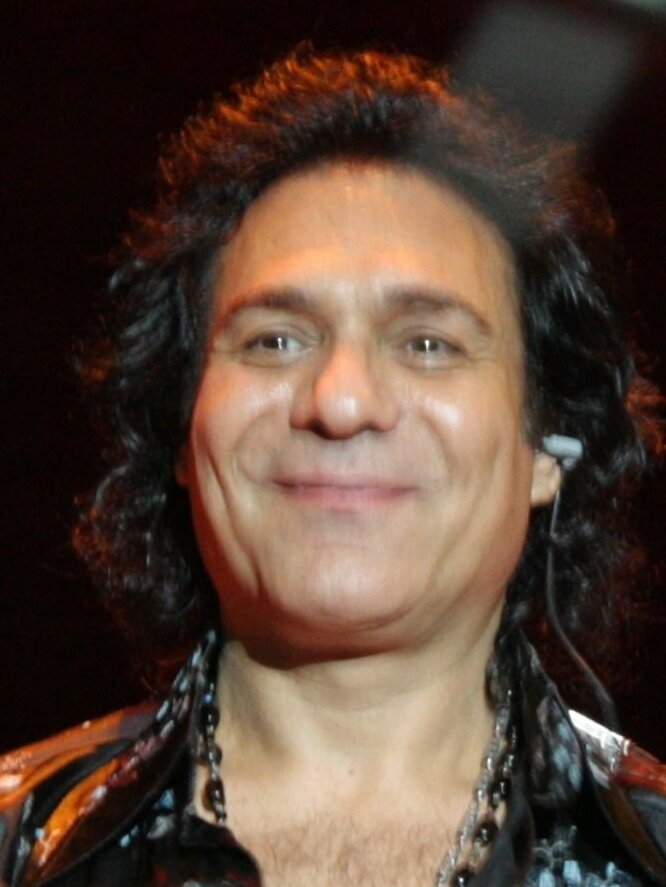
Andy
(1958)

==== Composers and instrumentalists ====
- Hambarsoom Grigorian – (1893 in Tabriz – 28 July 1975, Tehran) composer.
- Ivan Galamian – (23 January 1903 – 14 April 1981) violinist, teacher; Iranian Armenian-American.
- Robert Atayan – (7 November 1915, Tehran – 4 March 1994, Los Angeles) musicologist and composer.
- Varoujan Hakhbandian – (4 December 1936, Qazvin – 17 September 1977, Tehran) composer and songwriter.
- Loris Tjeknavorian – (13 October 1937, Boroujerd) composer and conductor.
- Armik – (1950s, Tabriz) guitarist, producer and composer.
- Vartan Vahramian – (1955, Tabriz) composer and painter.
- Khachik Babayan – (1956, Tabriz) violinist.
- Armen Ra – (1969, Tehran) thereminist.
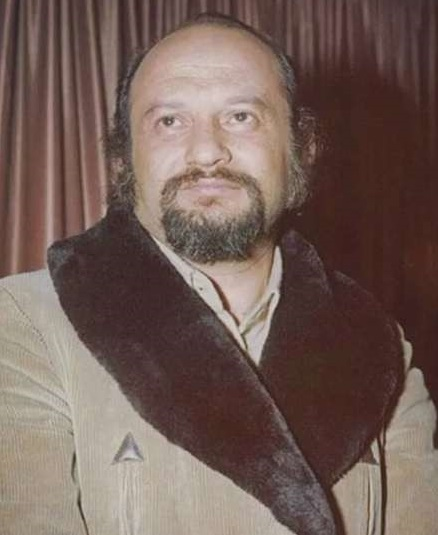
Varoujan Hakhbandian
(1936–1977)

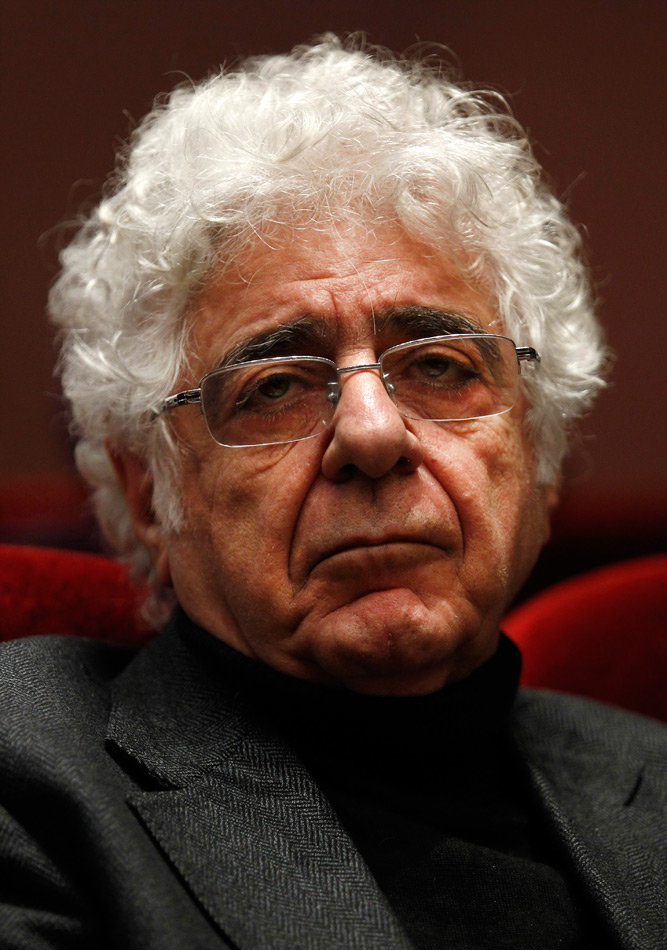
Loris Tjeknavorian
(1937)

=== Filmmaking ===
==== Actors ====
- Murad Kostanyan – (25 August 1902, Haftvan, Salmas – 3 January 1989, Yerevan) actor.
- Loreta – (1911, Tehran – 29 March 1998, Vienna) actress.
- Annik Shefrazian – (1909, Isfahan – 28 December 1996, Kahrizak) actress.
- Arman – (21 February 1921, Tabriz – 18 August 1980, Barcelona) actor.
- Yervand Manaryan – (20 September 1924, Arak – 19 February 2020) actor.
- Irene Zazians – (20 August 1927, Babolsar – 28 July 2012, Tehran) actress.
- Aramazd Stepanian – (11 October 1951, Abadan) actor, producer, director and playwright.
- Mary Apick – (16 June 1954, Tehran) actress.
- Marco Khan – (27 March 1961, Tehran) actor and stunt performer; Iranian-born Armenian-American.
- Vahik Pirhamzei – (6 November 1968) actor, producer, director and writer.
- Mahaya Petrosian – (3 January 1970, Tehran) actress.
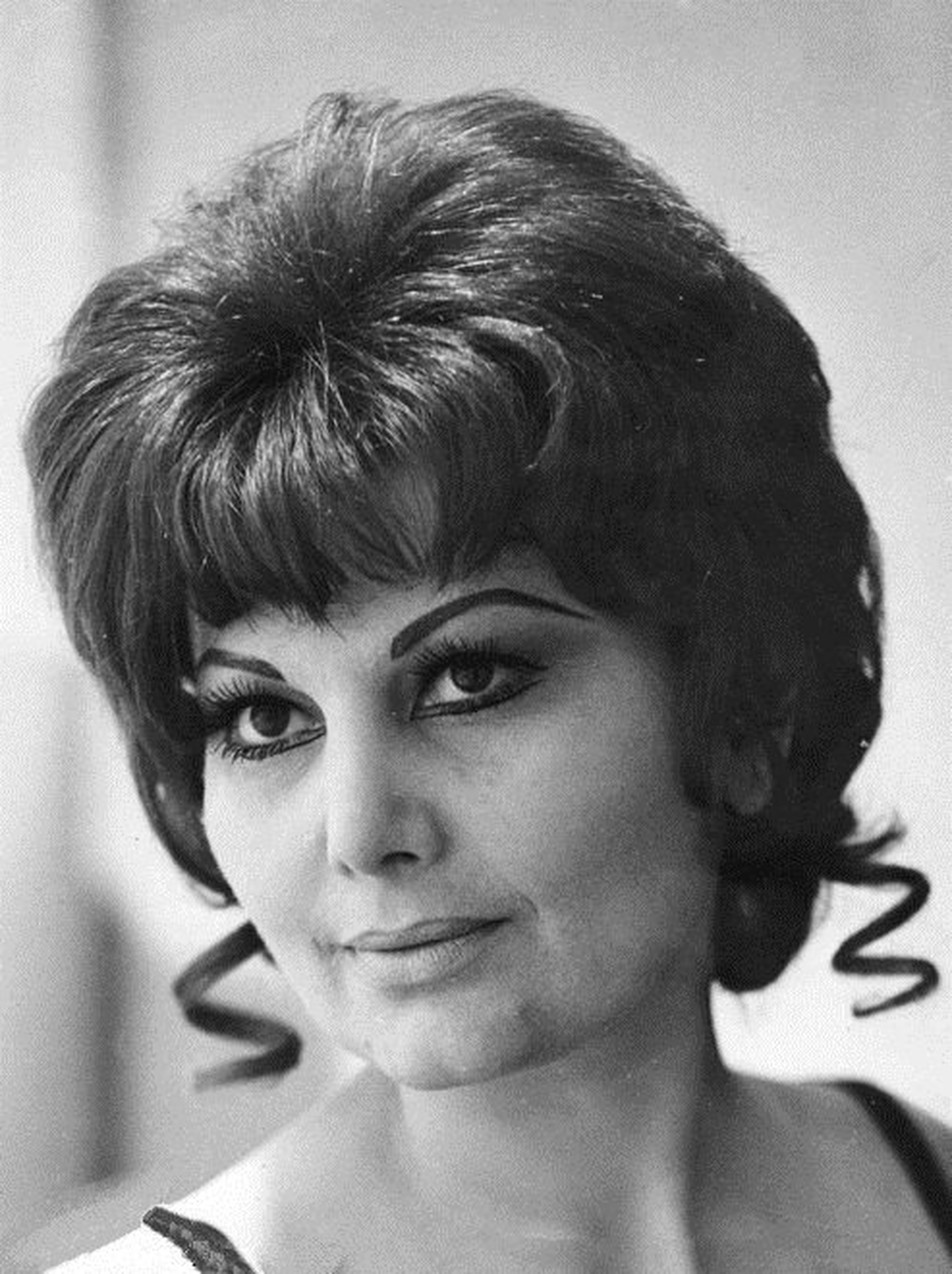
Irene Zazians
(1927–2012)

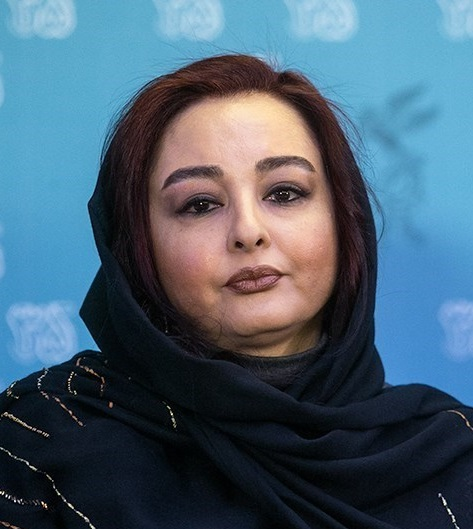
Mahaya Petrosian
(1970)

==== Directors ====
- Ovanes Ohanian – (8 October 1896, Mashhad – September 1961, Tehran) film director.
- Aramais Aghamalian – (1910, Julfa – 1985, Tehran) film director and screenwriter.
- Mushegh Sarvarian – (15 February 1910, Tehran – 13 August 1981, Tehran) film director.
- Samuel Khachikian – (21 October 1923 – 22 October 2001) film director, screenwriter, author, and film editor.
- Arman Manaryan – (15 December 1929, Arak – 16 February 2016) film director.
- Robert Ekhart – (1935, Tabriz – 1994, Los Angeles) film director.
- Varuzh Karim-Masihi – (1953, Arak) film director, film editor, and screenplay writer.
- Sarkis Djanbazian – (15 January 1913, Armavir – 11 December 1963, Tehran) ballet master, dancer, choreographer and producer.
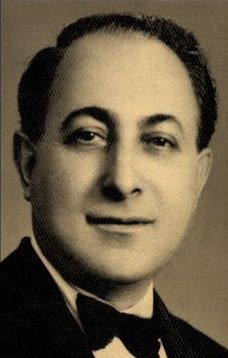
Ovanes Ohanian
(1896–1961)

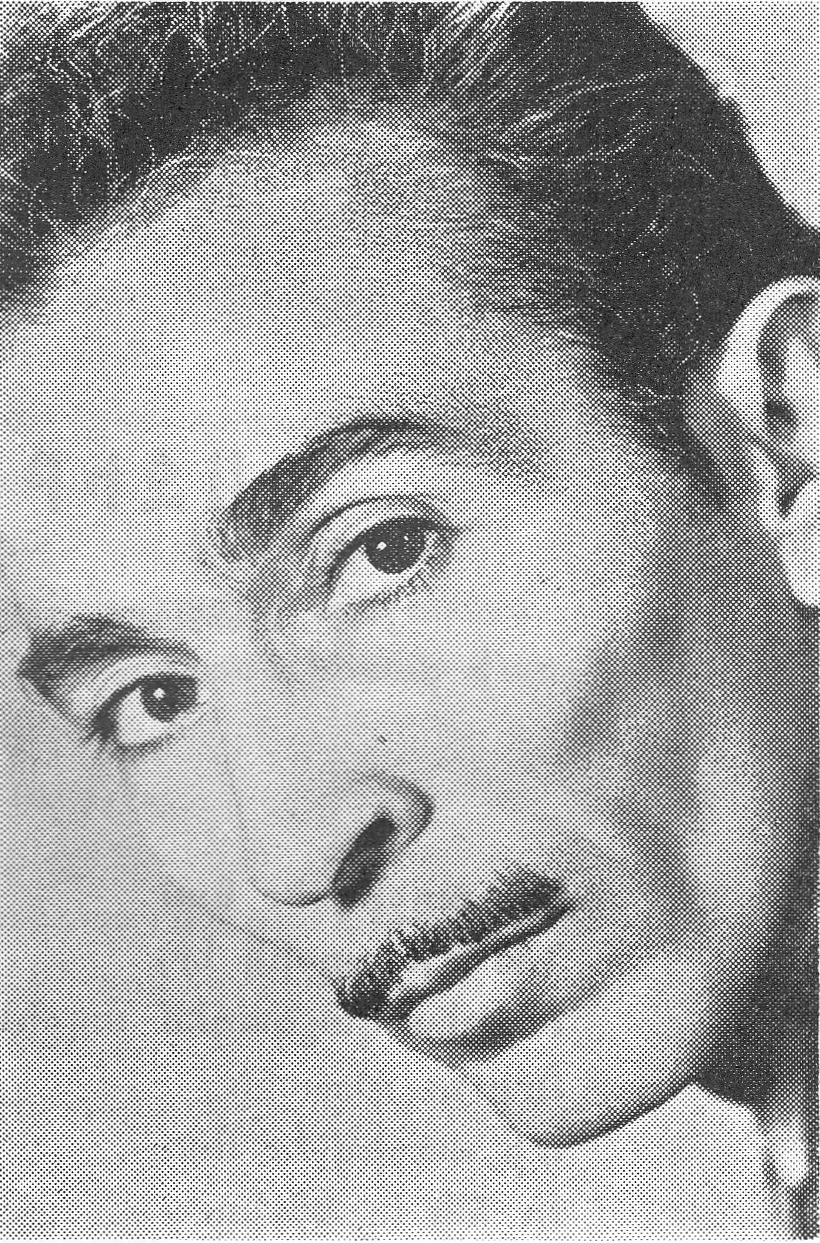
Samuel Khachikian
(1923–2001)

=== Writers ===
- Stepan Baghdasarian (hy) (7 March 1888, Arasbaran – 24 November 1941, Yerevan) playwright.

=== Artists ===
- Bogdan Saltanov – (1630s, New Julfa – 1703, Moscow) painter; Persian-born Armenian.
- Antoin Sevruguin – (1851, Tehran – 1933, Tehran) photographer.
- Sumbat Der Kiureghian – (19 October 1913, Isfahan – June 9, 1999, Los Angeles) watercolor painter.
- Marcos Grigorian – (5 December 1925 – 27 August 2007) painter and gallery owner.
- Nikol Faridani – (25 January 1936, Shiraz – 6 February 2008) photographer.
- Lilit Teryan – (31 December 1930, Tehran – 7 March 2019, Tehran) sculptor.
- Ray Aghayan – (28 July 1928, Tehran – 10 October 2011, Los Angeles) fashion designer and costume designer; Iranian Armenian-American.
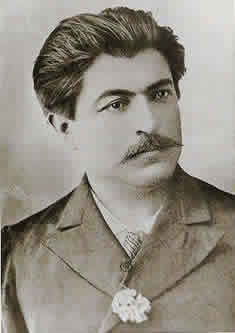
Antoin Sevruguin
(1851–1933)

== Branches of science ==
- Jean Althen – (1709 – 1774) agronomist.
- Emik Avakian – (5 August 1923, Tabriz – 11 July 2013, Chicopee) inventor; Iranian-Armenian-American.
- Maria Baghramian – (21 March 1954, Tehran) philosopher; Iranian-Armenian-Irish.

=== Applied science ===
- Gabriel Guevrekian – (21 November 1892 Istanbul – 29 October 1970 Antibes) architect.
- Vartan Hovanessian – (1896, Tabriz – 1982, Tehran) architect.
- Armen Hakhnazarian – ( 5 May 1941, Tehran – 19 February 2009, Aachen) architect.
- Armen Kocharian – (1948, Tehran) physician and cardiologist.
- Caro Lucas – (4 September 1949, Isfahan – 8 July 2010, Tehran) electrical engineer and inventor.
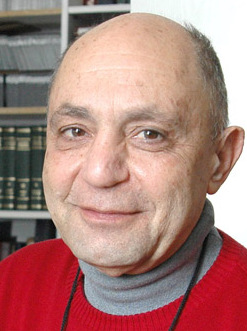
Armen Hakhnazarian
(1941)

=== Formal science ===
- Alexander Abian – (1 January 1923, Tabriz – 24 July 1999, Ames, Iowa) mathematician; Iranian-Armenian-American.

=== Natural sciences ===
- Arsen Minasian – (1906, Rasht – 3 April 1977, Rasht) pharmacist and philanthropist.
- Hayk Mirzayans – (1920, Qazvin – 2 April 1999) entomologist.
- Alenush Terian – (9 November 1921, Tehran – 4 March 2011, Tehran) aastronomer and physicist.
- Manuel Berberian – (27 October 1945, Tehran) earth scientist.
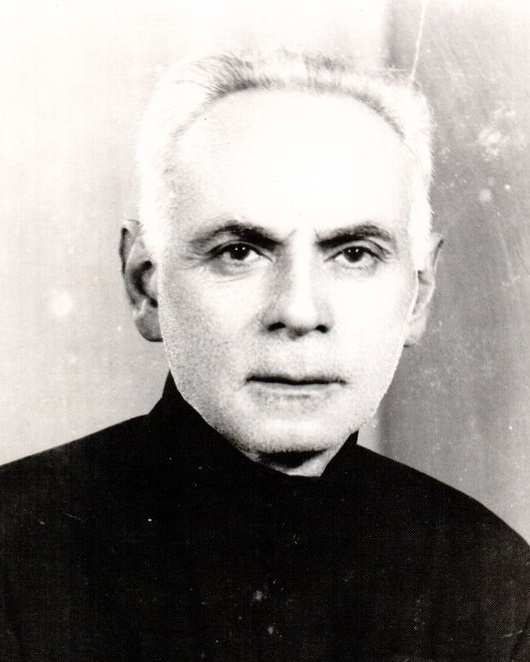
Arsen Minasian
(1906–1977)

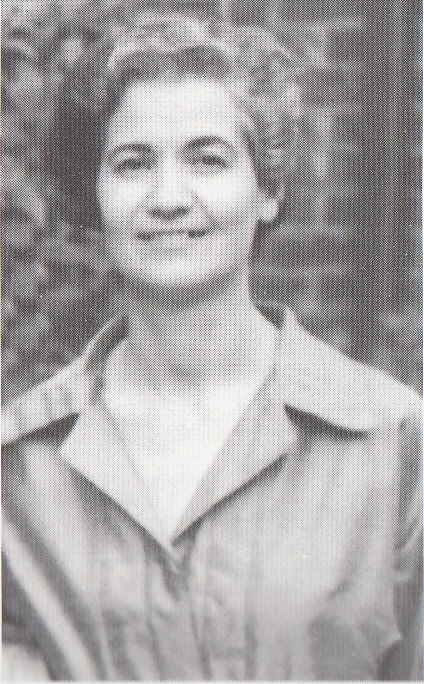
Alenush Terian
(1921–2011)

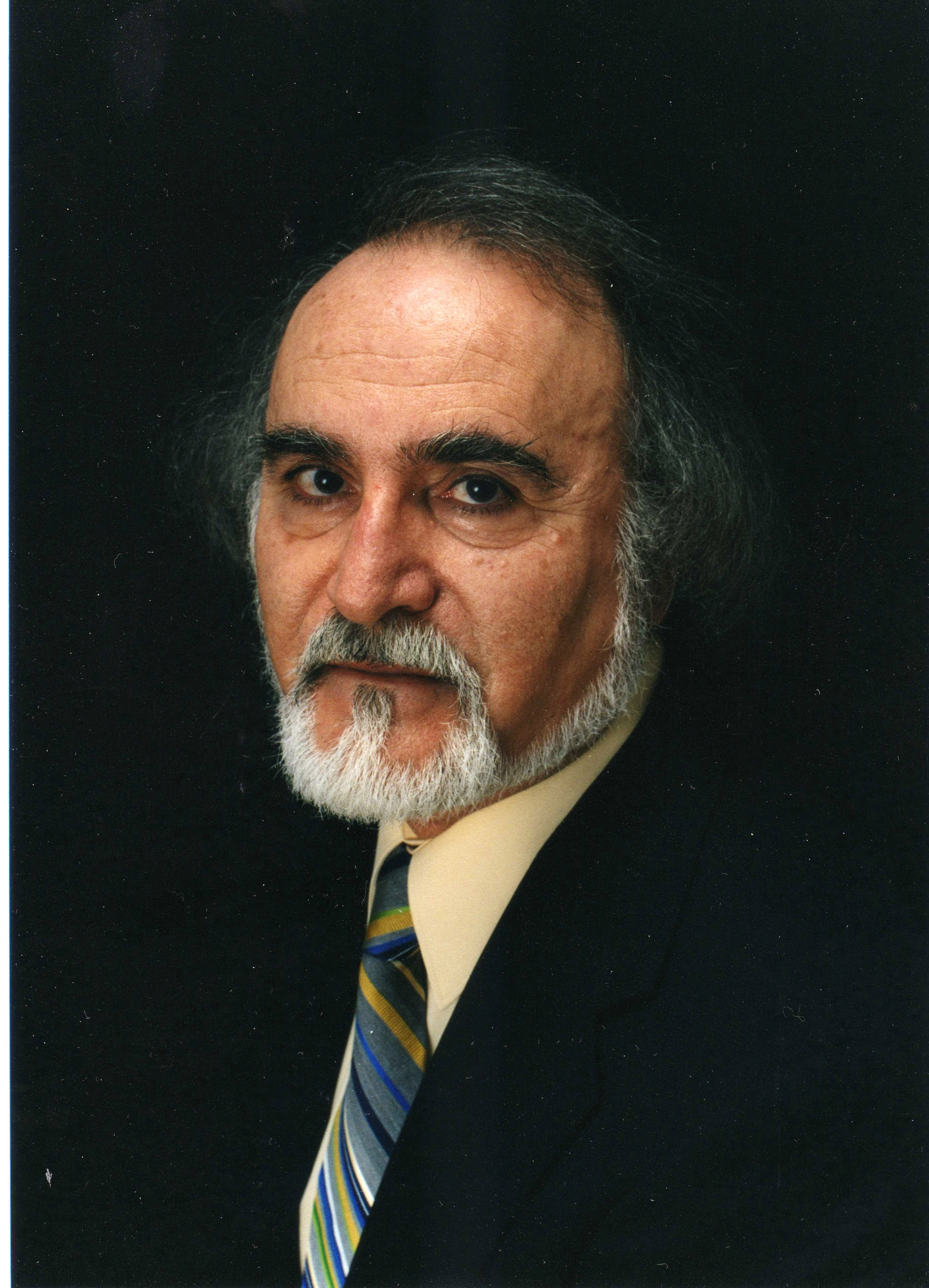
Manuel Berberian
(1945) Rouben Galichian - (30 November, 1938, Tabriz) Cartographer

=== Social science ===
- Arakel of Tabriz – (1590s, Tabriz – 1670) historian and clergyman.
- Shahamir Shahamirian – (1723 – 1797) political philosopher.
- Mesrovb Jacob Seth – (15 March 1871, Isfahan – 31 October 1939, Calcutta) historian.
- Vartan Gregorian – (8 April 1934, Tabriz – 15 April 2021, New York City) academic, educator, and historian.
- Ervand Abrahamian – (1940, Tehran) historian; Iranian-American.
- George Bournoutian – (25 September 1943, Isfahan – 22 August 2021, New Jersey) historian.
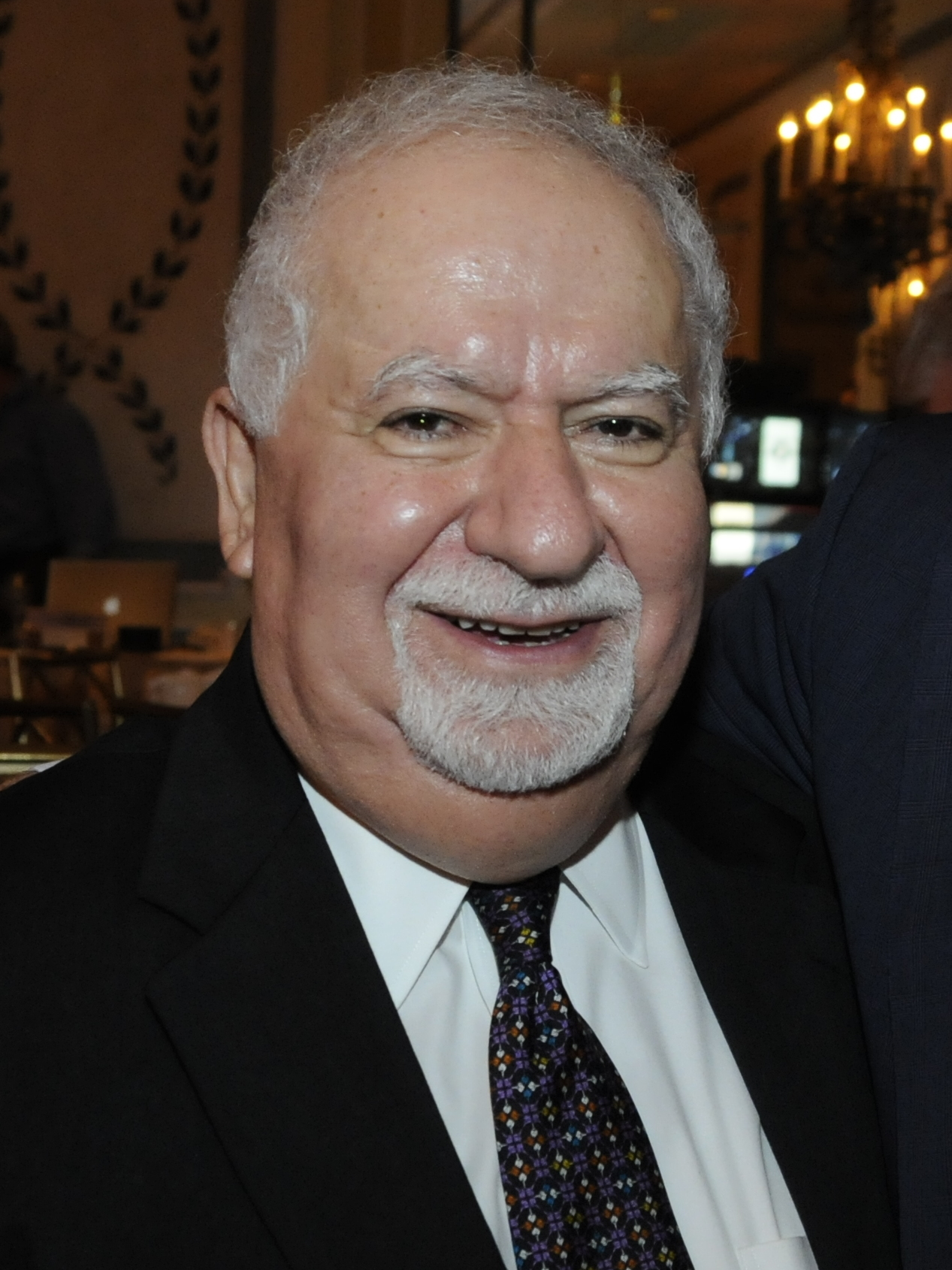
Vartan Gregorian
(1934–2021)

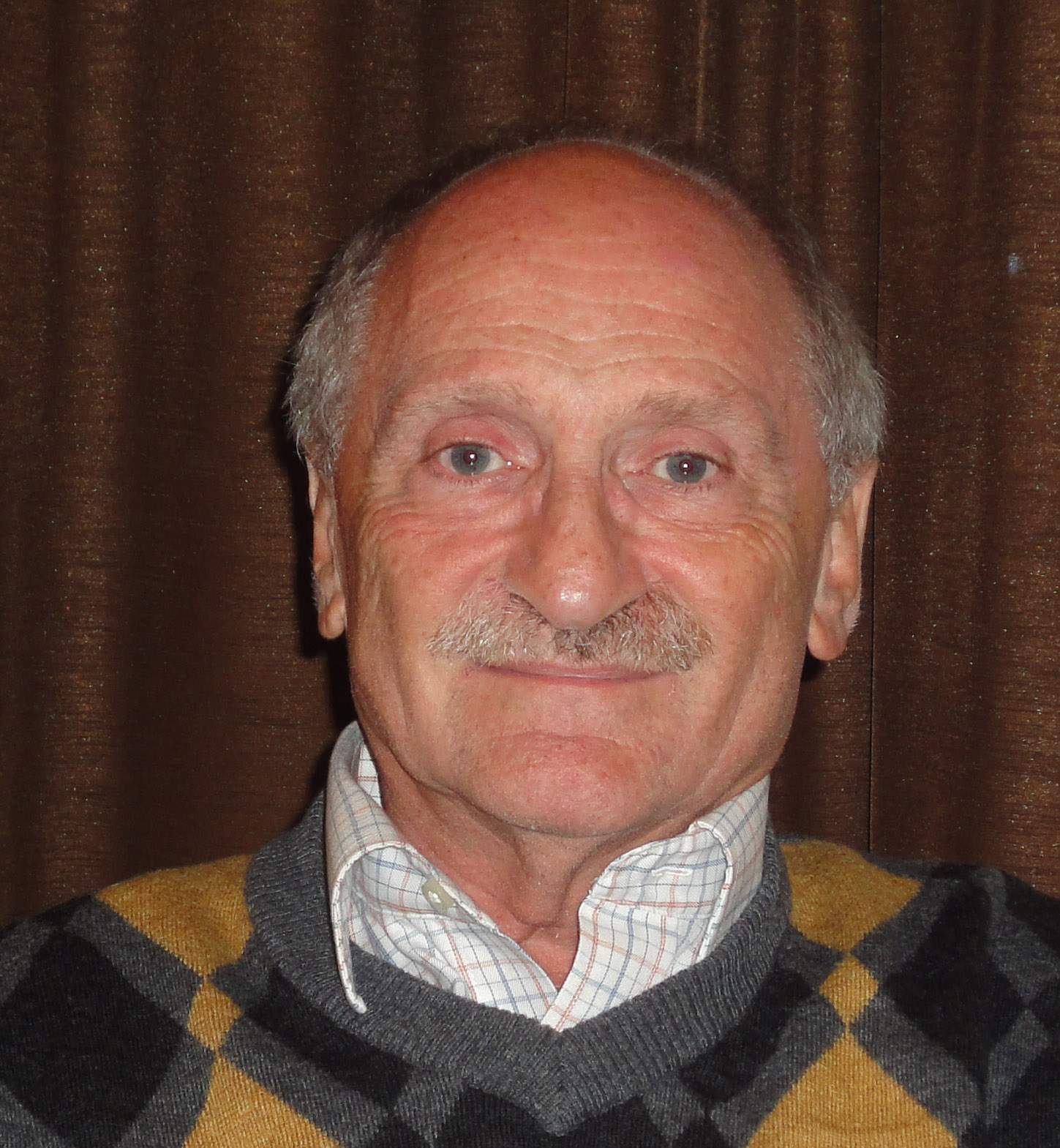
George Bournoutian
(1943–2021)

== Business ==
- Marcara Avanchintz – 17th-century powerful Armenian trader from Ispahan.
- Patrick Bet-David (1978-) - Businessman and Podcaster
- Ivan Lazarevich Lazarev – (4 December 1735 – 5 November 1801) financier and millionaire; Russian-Armenian-Iranian.
- Arathoon Stephen – (1861 – 14 May 1927) hotelier and real estate developer.
- Sarkis Acopian – (8 December 1926, Tabriz – 18 January 2007) businessman and philanthropist; Iranian-American.

== Education ==
- Bersabe Hovsepyan-Snhchyan (1906–1999), Iranian entrepreneur and school founder

== Literature ==
- Joseph Emin – (1726, Hamadan – 2 August 1809, Calcutta) prose writer and public figure.
- Mardik Martin – (16 September 1934 – 11 September 2019) screenwriter; Iranian Armenian-American.

=== Fiction writers ===
- Raffi – (1835, Payajuk – 25 April 1888, Tiflis) writer, poet, novelist, essayist.
- Hakob Karapents – (9 August 1925, Tabriz – 20 October 1994, Watertown, Massachusetts) short story writer and novelist.
- Zoya Pirzad – (1952, Abadan) novelist.

=== Poets ===
- Avetis Nazarbekian – (1866, Tabriz – 1939, Moscow) poet, journalist, political activist and revolutionary; Iranian-Russian Armenian
- Leonardo Alishan – (4 March 1951, Tehran – 8 January 2005, Salt Lake City, Utah) poet and literary scholar.
- Varand – (10 March 1954, Tehran) poet, playwright and lyricist.

== Military ==
- Khosrow Soltan Armani – (? – 1653) 17th-century Safavid official and military commander.
- Allahverdi Khan (Armenian) – (? – 1662) Safavid military officer.
- Alexander Khan Setkhanian – (1865, ? – 1953, ?) general, the Chief of Staff of the Cossack Brigade, a Commander in the Iranian Imperial Army
- Hayk Bzhishkyan – (18 February 1887, Tabriz – 11 December 1937, Moscow) military commander; Iranian Armenian-Soviet.

== Politics and government ==
=== Parthia ===
- Ariazate - daughter of the Artaxiad king Tigranes the Great, Parthian queen consort as the wife of the Parthian monarch Gotarzes I

=== Officials ===
- Hagopdjan de Deritchan – (?, New Julfa – 25 August 1726, Marseille) diplomat.
- Set Khan Astvatsatourian – (1780, ? – 1842, Tehran) businessman, Iran's ambassador to Great Britain, envoy to the Ottoman Empire, military advisor to Fath-Ali Shah
- Mirza Malkam Khan – (1834, New Julfa – 1908, Rome) writer, diplomat and publicist.
- Hovhannes Masehyan – (23 February 1864, Tehran – 19 November 1931, Kharbin) translator and diplomat.
- Vahan Papazian – (1876, Tabriz – 1973, Beirut) politician.
- Abraham Guloyan – (1893, Salmas – 1938) politician; Iranian Armenian-Soviet.
- Hrayr Maroukhian – (1928, Kermanshah – 1998), leader of the Armenian Revolutionary Federation
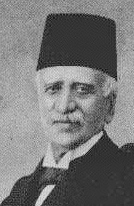
Mirza Malkam Khan
(1834–1908)

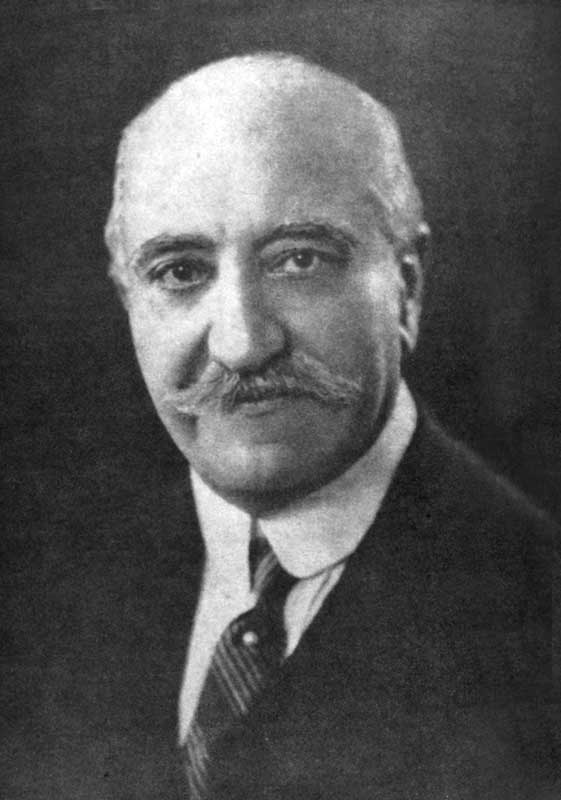
Hovhannes Masehyan
(1864–1931)

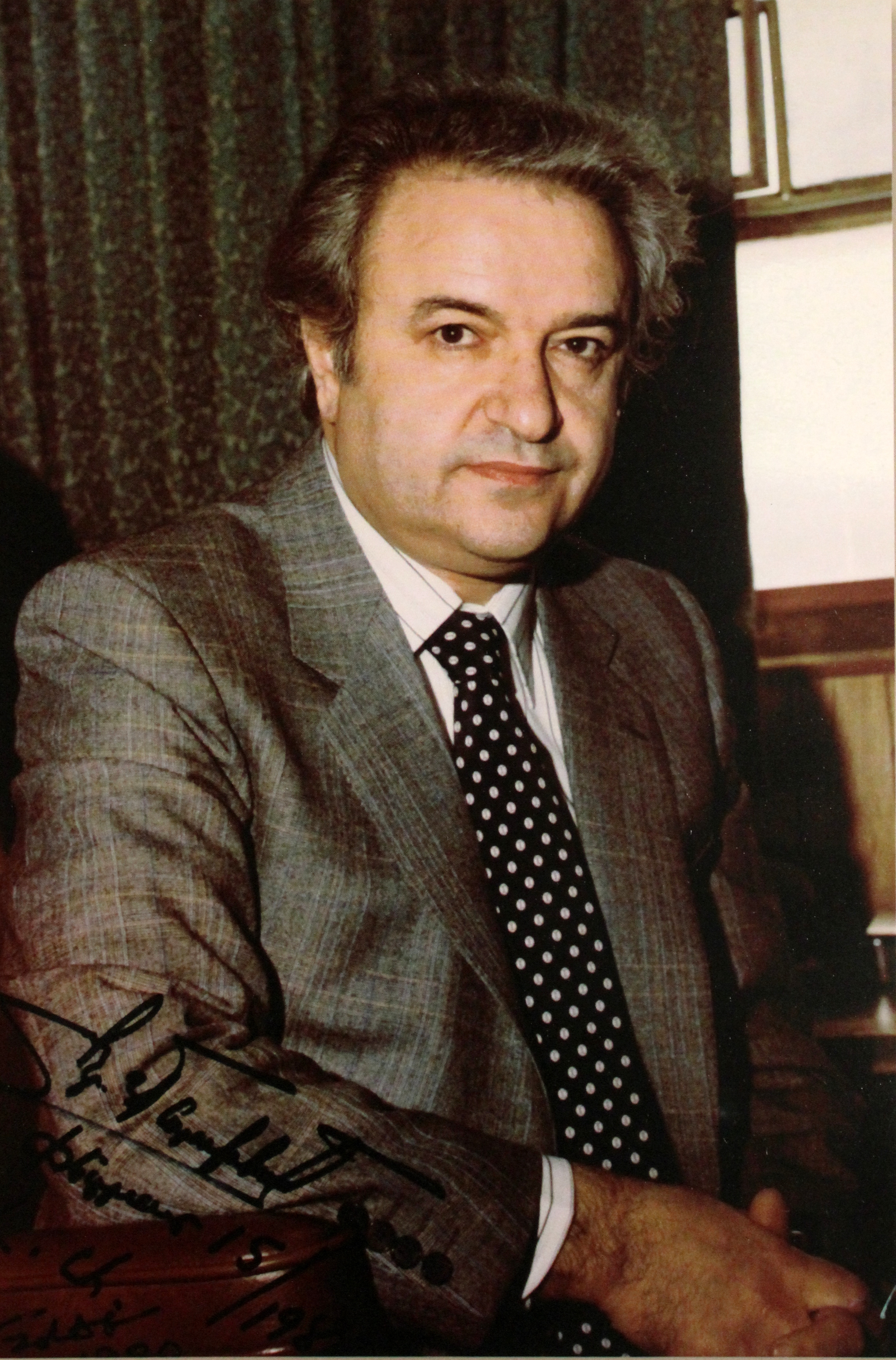
Hrayr Maroukhian
(1928–1988)

=== Parliament and party members ===
- Avetis Sultan-Zade – (1889, Maragheh – 1938) Communist Party of Persia politician.
- Ardeshir Ovanessian – (1905, Rasht – 1990, Yerevan) Members of the 14th Iranian Majlis, Communist Party of Persia politician.
- Levon Davidian – (24 March 1944, Hamadan – 15 July 2009) psychiatrist, Member of the 6th Islamic Consultative Assembly.
- Hrant Markarian – (1958, Isfahan) politician; Iranian-Armenian.
- Robert Beglarian – (1961, Tehran) Member of the 9th, 8th, and 7th Islamic Consultative Assembly.
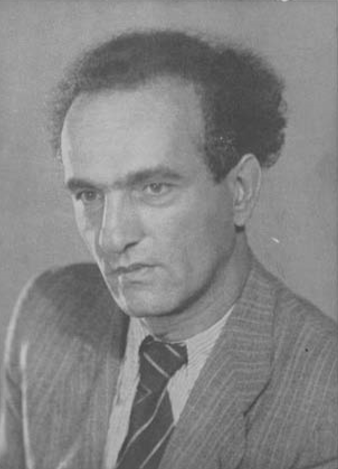
Ardeshir Ovanessian
(1905–1990)

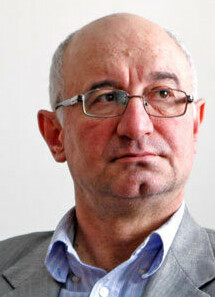
Robert Beglarian
(1961)

== Religion ==
- Stepanos V of Salmast – (?, Salmas – 1567, Etchmiadzin) Catholicos of All Armenians from 1547 to 1567.
- Alexander I of Julfa – (? – 22 November 1714, Etchmiadzin) Catholicos of the Armenian Apostolic Church between 1706 and 1714.
- Harutyun Shmavonyan – (1750, Shiraz – India 1824, Madras, India) priest of the Armenian Apostolic Church and journalist.
- Haik Hovsepian Mehr – (6 January 1945, Tehran – 19 January 1994) bishop of the Jama'at-e Rabbani church.

== Sports ==
=== Individual sports ===
==== Combat sports ====
- Emmanuel Agassi – (25 December 1930, Salmas – 24 September 2021, Las Vegas) boxer; Assyiran-Armenian.
- Sarkis Assadourian – (22 May 1948) fencer.
- Masis Hambarsumian – (3 June 1951) retired light-heavyweight boxer.
- Vartex Parsanian – (7 August 1952) boxor.
- Patrik Baboumian – (1 July 1979, Abadan) retired strongman and former bodybuilder.
- Gegard Mousasi – (1 August 1985) mixed martial artist and former kickboxer; Dutch-Iranian.

=== Team sports ===
- Emil Vartazarian – (25 May 1976) retired rugby and association football player.
- Oshin Sahakian – (21 March 1986) basketball player.
- Aren Davoudi – (12 July 1986) basketball player.

==== Football ====
- Garnik Mehrabian – (September 1937 – 5 June 2022) football player and coach.
- Karo Haghverdian – (11 January 1945, Tehran) former footballer.
- Mayis Minasyan – (1 January 1951, Tehran) former midfielder.
- Andranik Eskandarian – (31 December 1951, Tehran) former footballer .
- Garnik Shahbandari – (1954, Tehran) midfielder.
- Vazgen Safarian – (1954, Tehran) former footballer.
- Markar Aghajanyan – (4 March 1965, Tehran) defence and manager.
- Edmond Akhtar – (18 November 1971, Tehran) forward.
- Serjik Teymourian – (29 May 1974 – 29 August 2020) defensive midfielder.
- Edmond Bezik – (12 August 1975, Tehran) retired footballer and coach.
- Robert Markosi – (14 August 1976) former footballer.
- Sebo Shahbazian – (25 September 1980, Tehran) retired defender.
- Andranik Teymourian – (6 March 1983, Tehran) footballer.
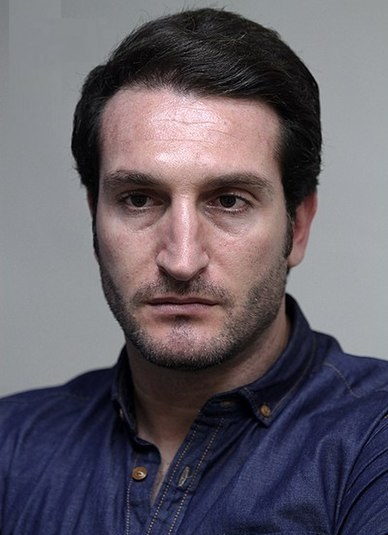
Edmond Bezik
(1975)

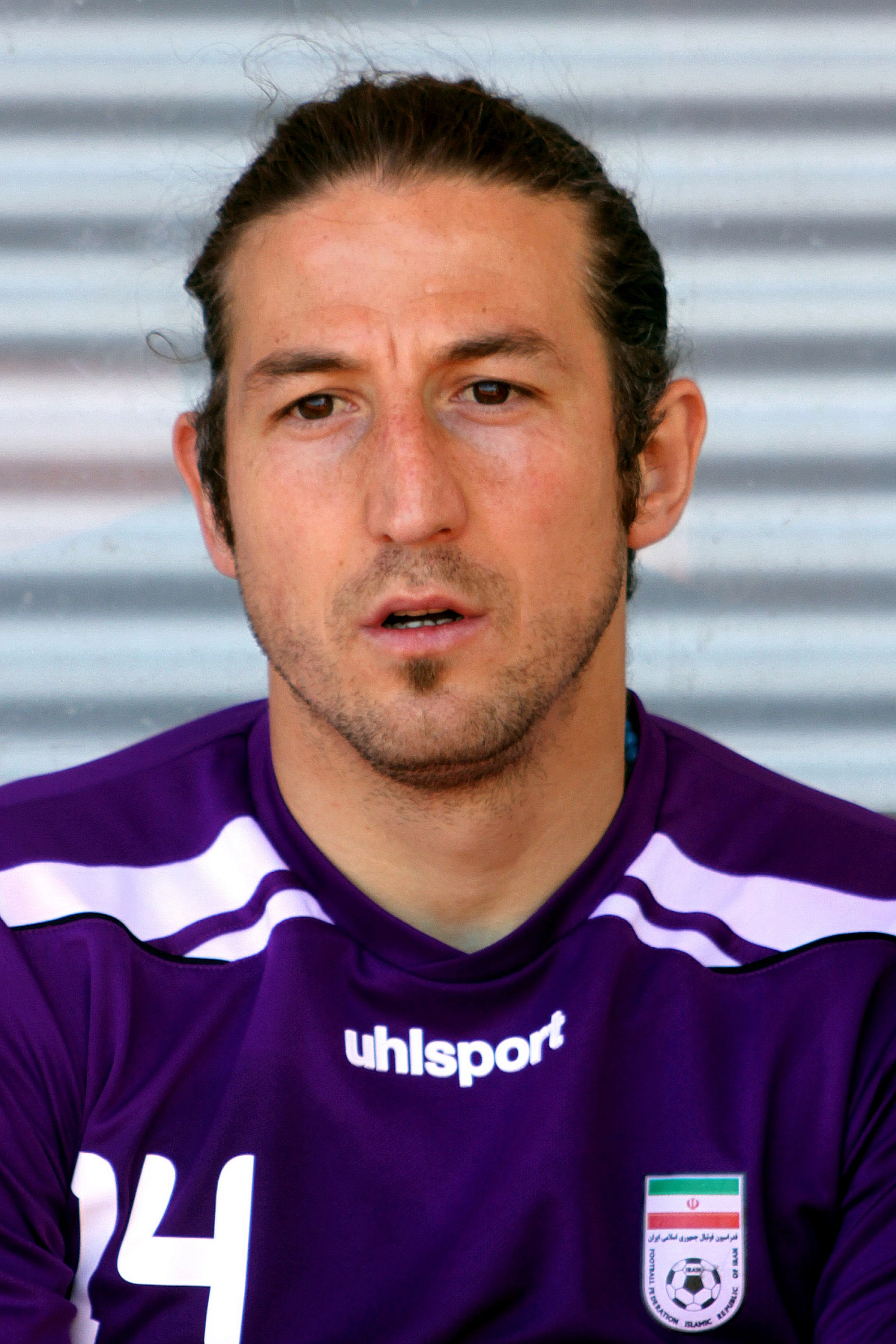
Andranik Teymourian
(1983)

== See also ==
- List of Iranians
- List of Armenians
- List of Iraqi Armenians
- List of Ottoman Armenians
- List of Turkish Armenians
