= Minasyan =

Minasyan, Minasian or Minassian (Armenian: Մինասյան) is an Armenian surname.

Notable people with the surname include:

== Minasyan ==
- Anahit Minasyan, First Lady of Armenia
- Arthur Minasyan, multiple people
- Gor Minasyan (born 1994), Armenian weightlifter
- Grigor Minasyan (born 1983), Armenian politician
- Mayis Minasyan (born 1951), Armenian-Iranian footballer
- Mikayel Minasyan (born 1977), Armenian public figure, diplomat and media mogul
- Sarik Minasyan (born 1980), Armenian politician
- Vahagn Minasyan (born 1985), Armenian footballer
- Vardan Minasyan (born 1974), Armenian footballer and manager

== Minasian ==
- Ara Minasian (born 1974), Armenian chess grandmaster
- Arsen Minasian, Armenian-Iranian physician
- Artashes Minasian (born 1967), Armenian chess player
- David Minasian, film producer, screenwriter, director, and musician, singer and songwriter
- Isaiah Aram Minasian (born 1986), an English violinist of Armenian descent from Brighton
- Perry Minasian (born 1980), American baseball executive, brother of Zack
- Ruben Ter Minasian, Armenian revolutionary and politician
- Zack Minasian, American baseball executive, brother of Perry

== Minassian ==
- Anahide Ter Minassian, born Anahide Kévonian (1929–2019), French historian of Armenian origin
- Alek Minassian (born 1992), Armenian-Canadian perpetrator of the Toronto van attack
- Craig Minassian, chief communications and marketing officer of the Clinton Foundation
- Leone Minassian (1905–1978), Ottoman Empire-born Italian painter of Armenian descent.
- Levon Minassian, French-Armenian duduk player
- Margarita Ervandovna Ter-Minassian (1910–1995), sometimes as Ter-Minasyan or Ter-Minasian, Soviet entomologist
- Nicolas Minassian (born 1973), French race driver of Armenian descent
- Raphaël Minassian (born 1946), Lebanese-born Armenian Catholic archbishop
- Sarkis Minassian (1873–1915), also known as Aram Ashod, Armenian journalist, writer, and political activist
