= Marousia Vahramian =

Iranian–Armenian painter, engraver and theatre director (1919–2012)

- ماروسيا واهراميان
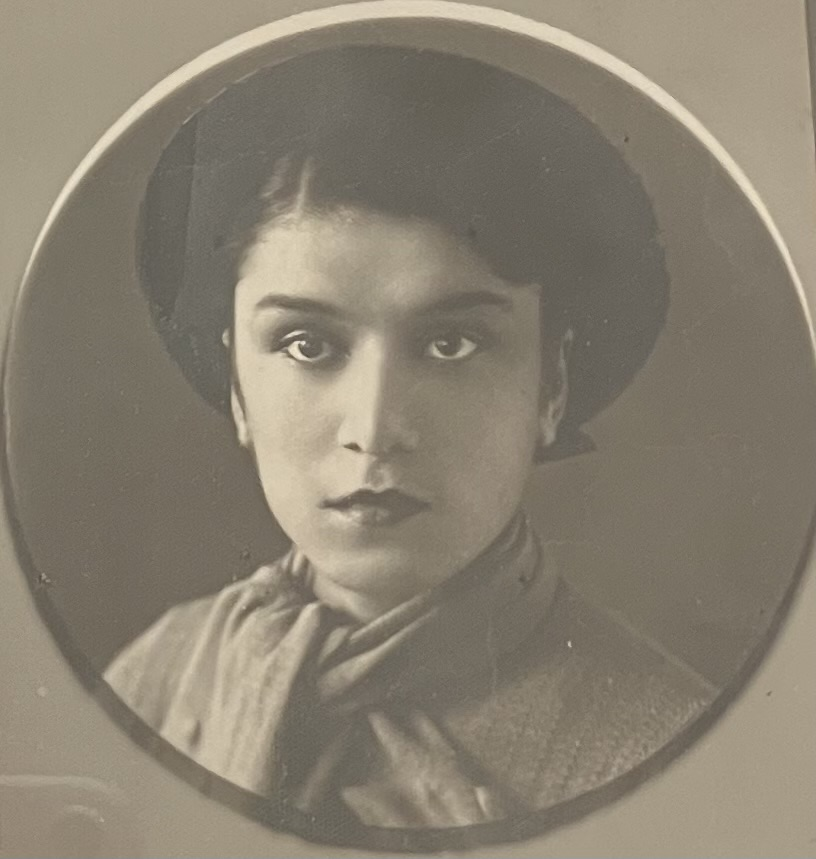
- Vahramian aged 17
- Born: Marousia Arakelian; 15 March 1919; Armavir, Russia
- Died: 1 July 2012 (aged 93); Tabriz, Iran
- Years active: c. 1938–2000s
- Known for: Impressionist painting; silver engraving; theatre direction
- Spouse: Grigor Vahramian Gasparbeg (m. 1953; died 1963)
- Children: Vartan Vahramian

Marousia Vahramian (Armenian: Մարուսյա Վահրամյան; 15 March 1919 – 1 July 2012) was an Iranian–Armenian impressionist painter, silver engraver, musician and theatre director based mainly in Tabriz, Iran. She has been described as one of the early professional Iranian women impressionist painters and among the first Iranian female silver engravers.

== Early life and education ==
Born Marousia Arakelian in an upper middle class family in Armavir, Russia, in 1919, Vahramian moved to Iran as a child when her father Gevork Arakelian resettled the family in Tabriz and became a co‑owner of an early flour factory in the city. Her parents encouraged the education of their three daughters; she attended an Armenian school and later the Russian Gymnasium in Tabriz, studying piano and foreign languages privately. She became fluent in Armenian, Persian, Turkish, Russian, French and English.

== Artistic training and early career ==
In her late teens she studied painting under (and later married) artist Grigor Vahramian Gasparbeg, who had relocated from Moscow to Tabriz. She practised classical drawing techniques in his studio, producing early black‑chalk heads (Zeus, Apollo, Socrates) and self‑portraits prior to her mature oil work. Her first exhibitions were held in Tabriz and later in Abadan and Tehran (dates variably reported).

== Teaching and theatre work ==
Vahramian worked for the Ministry of Education and, with her husband, was invited to teach at the newly founded Mirak School of Fine Art in Tabriz, where she taught painting to female students for over 25 years. She also gave private piano lessons and later served as a guide and translator at the Tabriz Museum. Her theatre involvement began in 1938–1939 (1317–1318 SH) with Shushanik Khan Aramian’s literary and artistic group, performing in plays such as Khatabala and The Destroyed House by Gabriel Sundukian, and later in Levon Shant's The Queen of the Fallen Castle. She eventually directed and designed productions, leading a ten‑member troupe and staging works including The Foreign Son‑in‑Law, For the Sake of Honor, Khatabala, The Destroyed House, and Another Victim between the 1980s and 2000s.

== Style and subjects ==
Vahramian produced floral still lifes (roses and Persian lilacs from her garden), urban and domestic landscapes of Tabriz, and natural scenery from Urmia and Maragheh. Her drawings reflect exposure to Greco‑Roman classical forms, while her engraved silver pieces combine figurative and decorative filigree motifs (examples dated 1945, signed "M. Arakelian" / "Studio Vahramian").

== Engraving and craft ==
In addition to painting and theatre, Vahramian studied engraving and filigree at a time when the craft in Iran was male‑dominated. Surviving signed silver plaques (e.g. an interpretation of the Brothers Grimm's "Golden Bird" and military portrait miniatures) illustrate her adaptation of narrative and mythological subject matter into metalwork.

== Documentary ==
A 30‑minute documentary titled Maroosya (dir. Navid Mikhak) portrays her preparing to stage a final theatrical piece titled Komitas. The film was screened at the Arpa International Film Festival (Hollywood), the Kazan Festival (Russia), the International Apricot Festival (Armenia), and Iran’s Cinema Vérité International Documentary Festival.

== Recognition and legacy ==
Her six‑decade career was highlighted in the 2005 Raffi Calendar, which reproduced twelve oil paintings and a short biographical note labelled "Iranian Painter Mrs Marousia Vahramian". Vahramian has been noted within Iranian–Armenian cultural histories for integrating visual arts, music and theatre in regional artistic life.

Marousia Vahramian was a versatile artist. Her painting Our Balcony depicts the balcony designed by her husband Grigor Vahramian Gasparbeg supported by Corinthian columns adorned by climbing plants at the base of the columns and a fusion of white roses on the left. This was painted in 2006 when she was 85 years old.

Marousia's passion for art never left her and she continued painting until her death. Not being dictated by patrons or by financial rewards, gave her the freedom to immerse herself in her art. The artist's keen eye for beauty and the appreciation for nature that so captivated her soul all her life is especially evident in her still lifes where she brings up the beauty of the flowers-notably lilacs, roses and chrysanthemums.

Marousia has left a rich legacy of artwork that includes engravings, drawings, intricate filigrees and paintings. These works span over seven decades.

== Death ==
Vahramian died on 1 July 2012 in Tabriz at the age of 93.

== Gallery ==
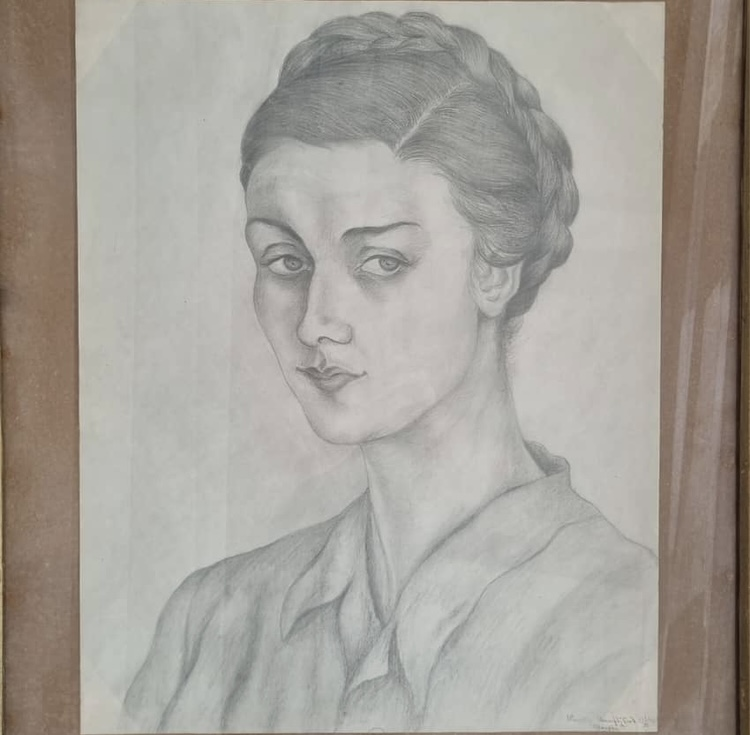
Self Portrait in black chalk on white paper signed c 1943

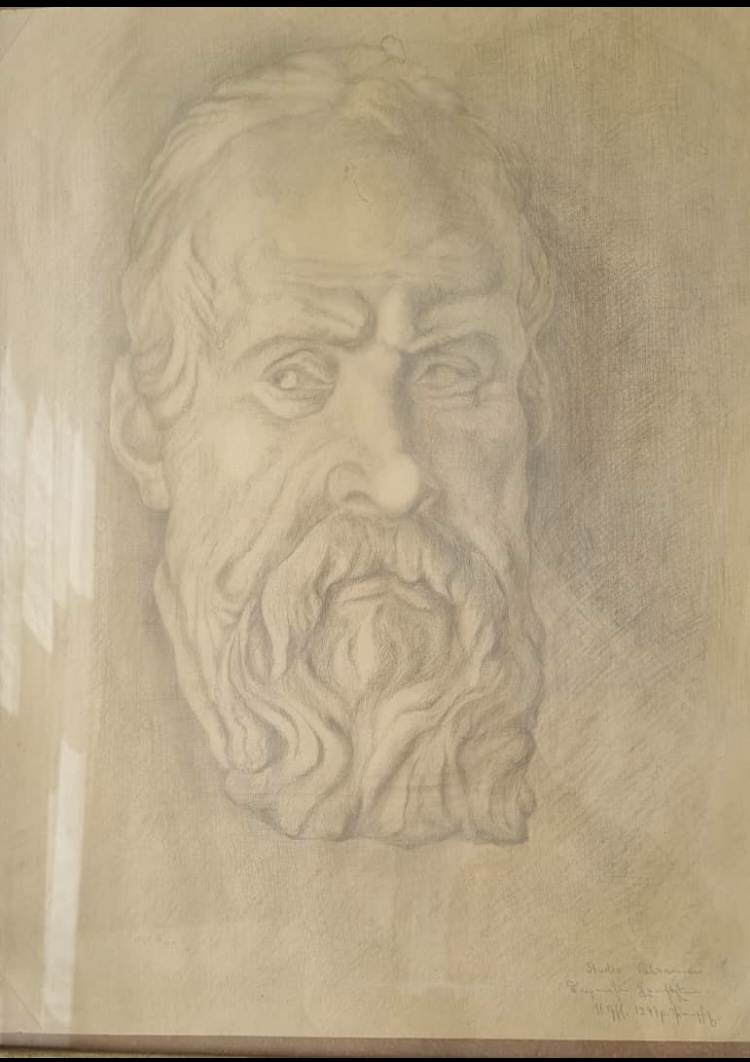
Head of Socrates by Marousia Vahramian signed Marousia Arakelian Studio Vahramian 11th December 1947

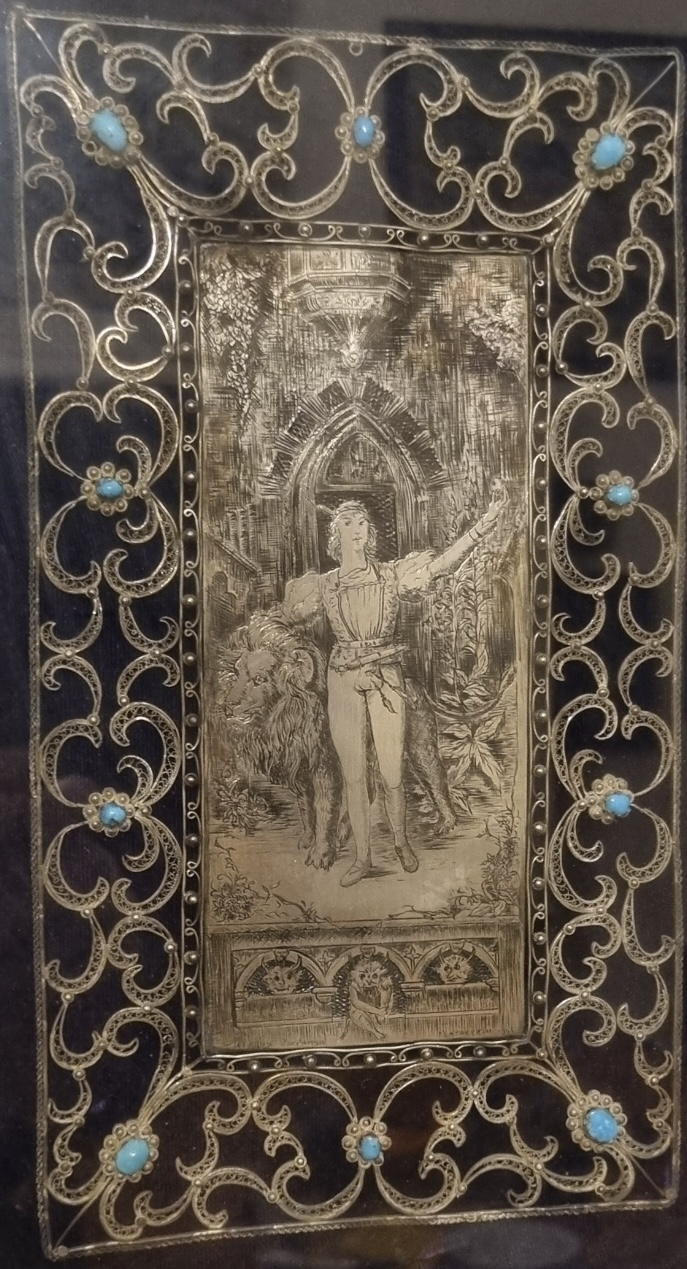
Engraving of The Golden Bird from The Brothers Grimm fairy tale by Marousia Vahramian. This is a superb example of her engravings on silver. The engraving depicts a prince standing next to a lion holding an apple. The filigree boarder with turquoise stones are also her work. Signed M. Arakelian and dated 1945

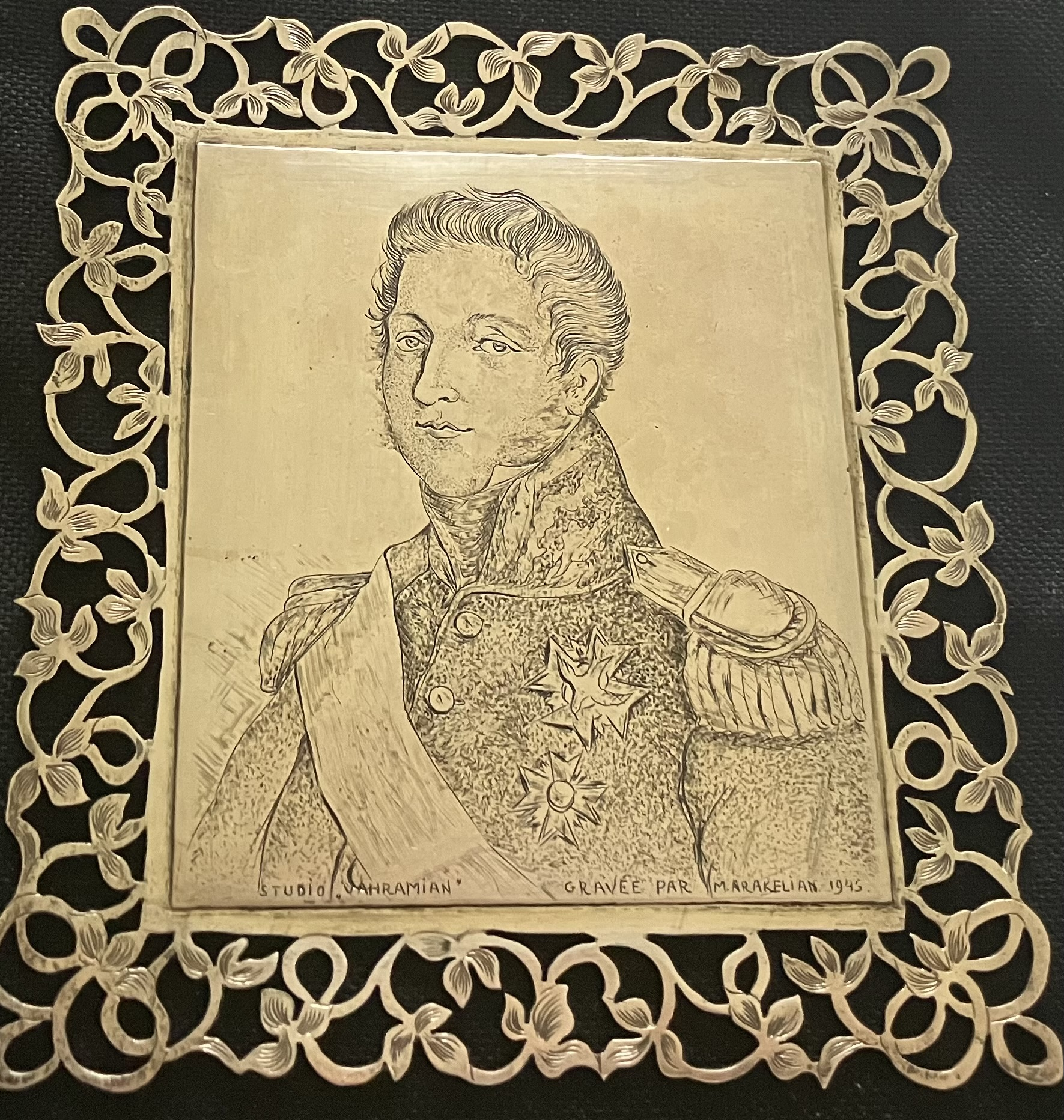
Engraving on silver of a military gentleman. Engraving and filigree by Marousia Vahrmian (nee Arakelian). Work is currently held in a private collection. Dated 1945

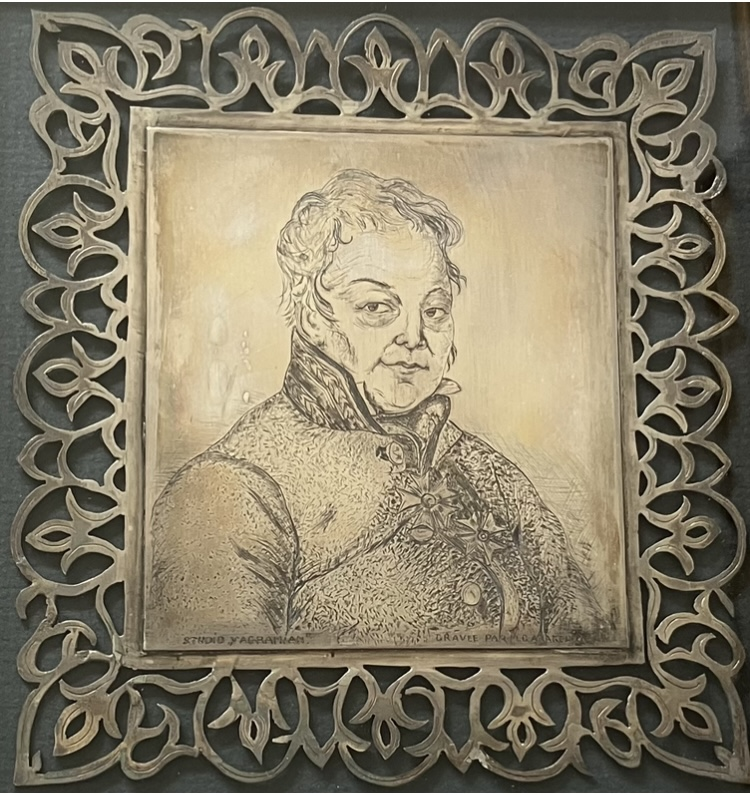
Engraving of an elderly gentleman in military attire signed by Marousia Arakelian, trademarked under Studio Vahramian circa 1945. Border and filigree also by the artist herself. 12cm width x 13cm height (measurements include the filigree border)

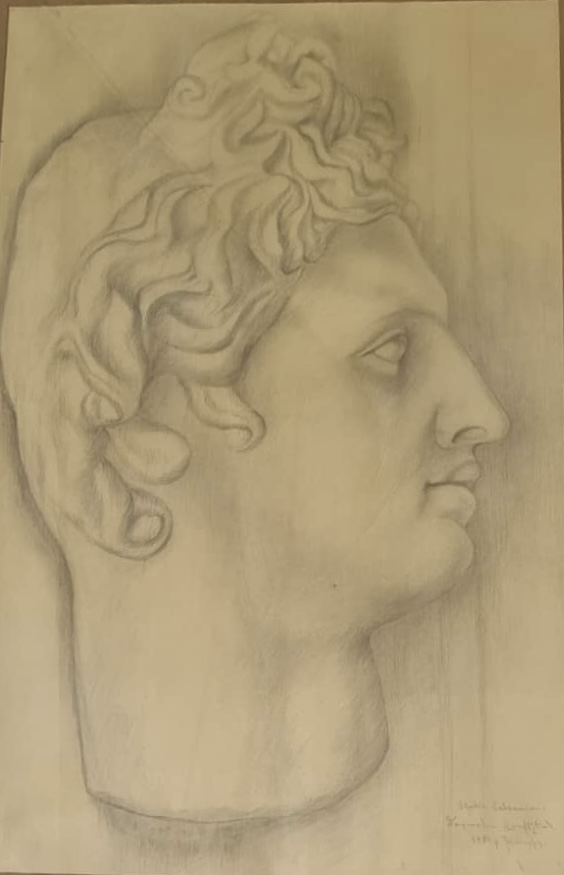
Drawing of Apollo in black chalk on white paper signed Marousia Arakelian and trademarked under Studio Vahramian dated 1950, Tabriz

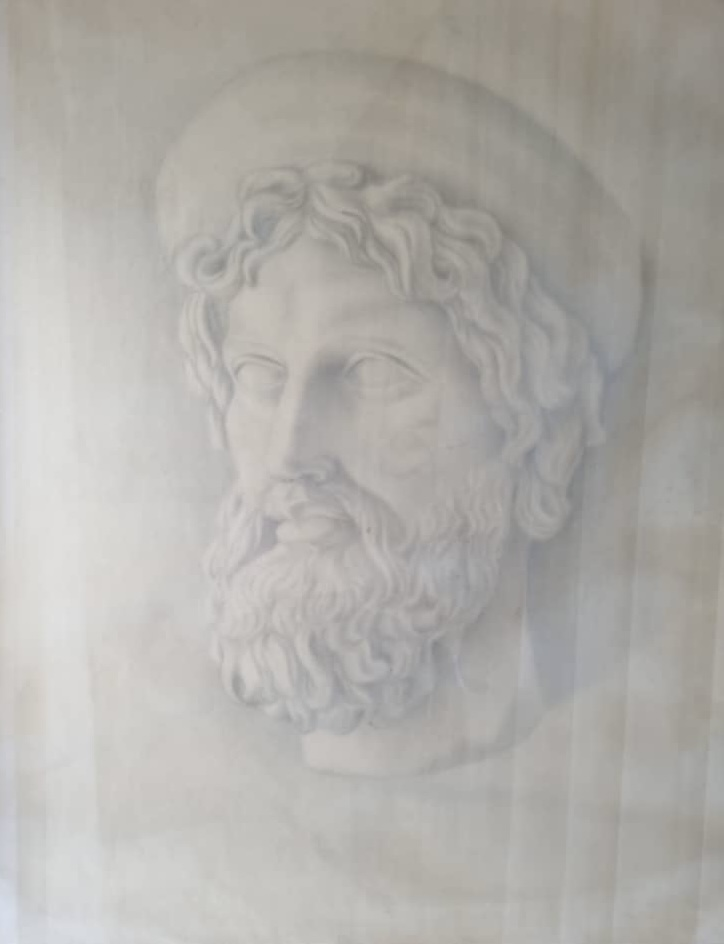
Drawing of Zeus in black chalk on white paper by Marosuia Vahramian circa 1950

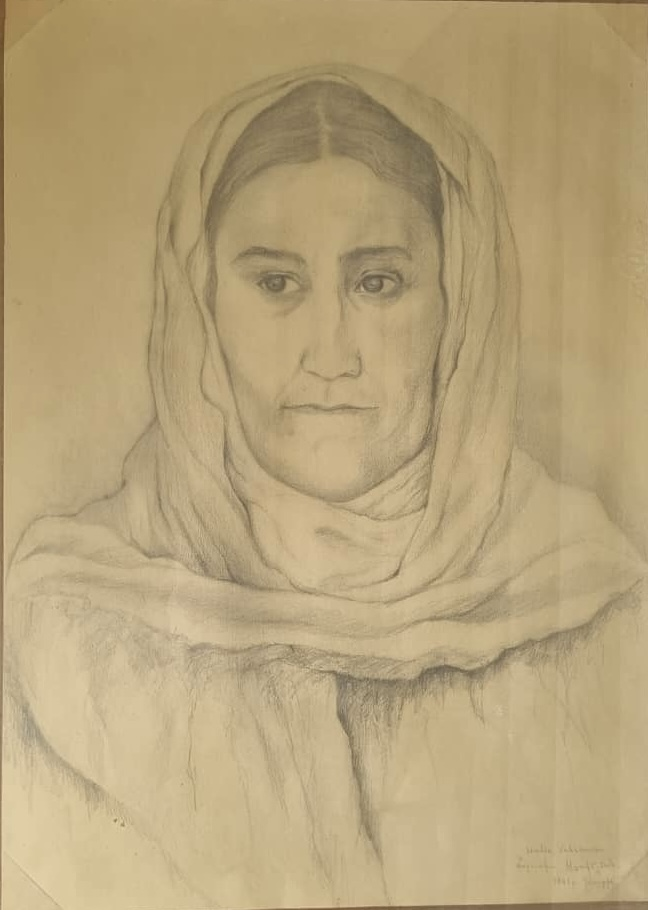
Bread Baker by Marousia Vahramian dated 1941, Tabriz, signed Marousia Arakelian and trademarked under Studio Vahramian

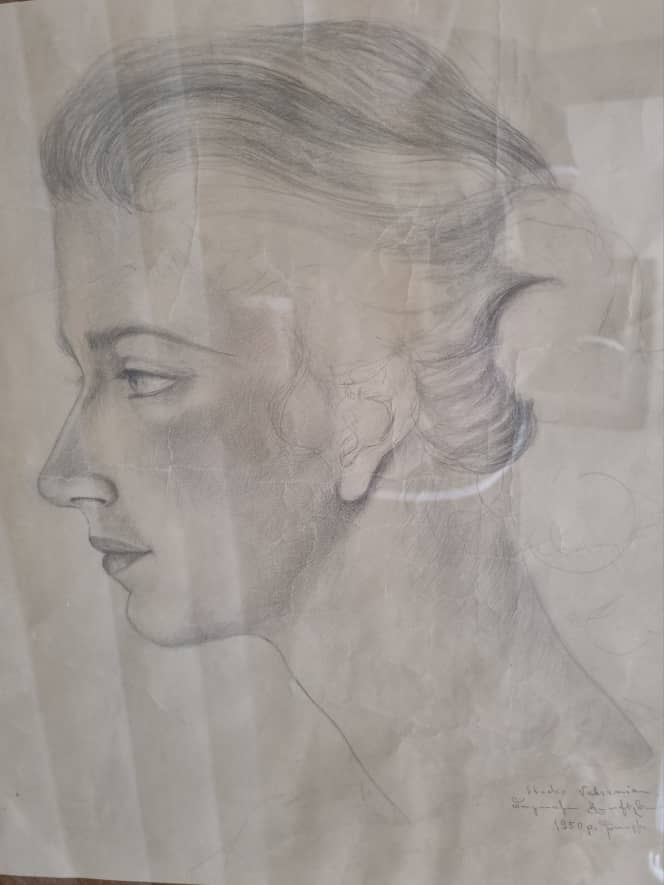
Profile of a European lady signed Marousia Arakelian, trademarked under Studio Vahramian and dated 1950, Tabriz

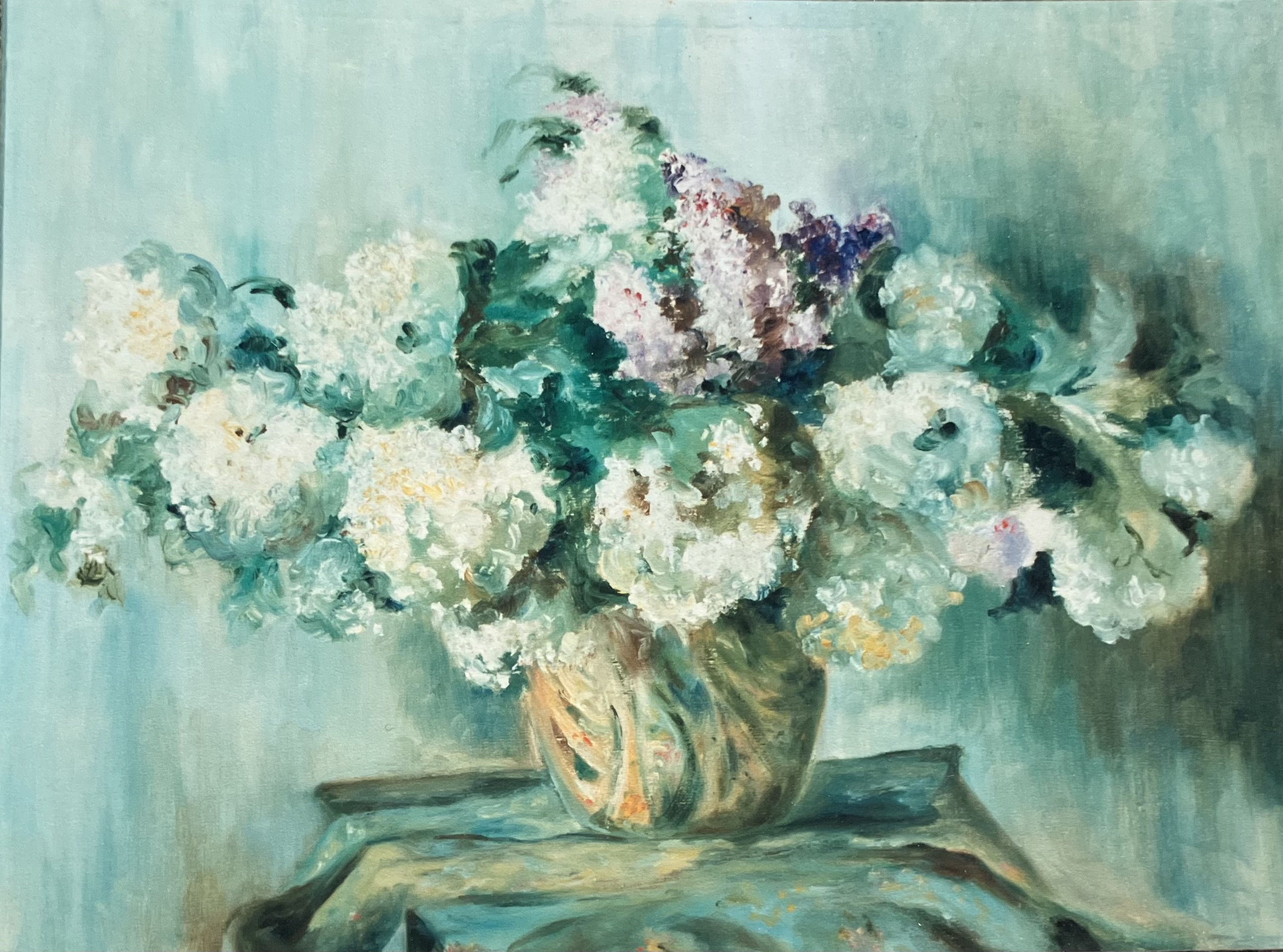
Painting of Persian Lilacs by Marousia Vahramian .jpeg. 60cm wide x 44cm height

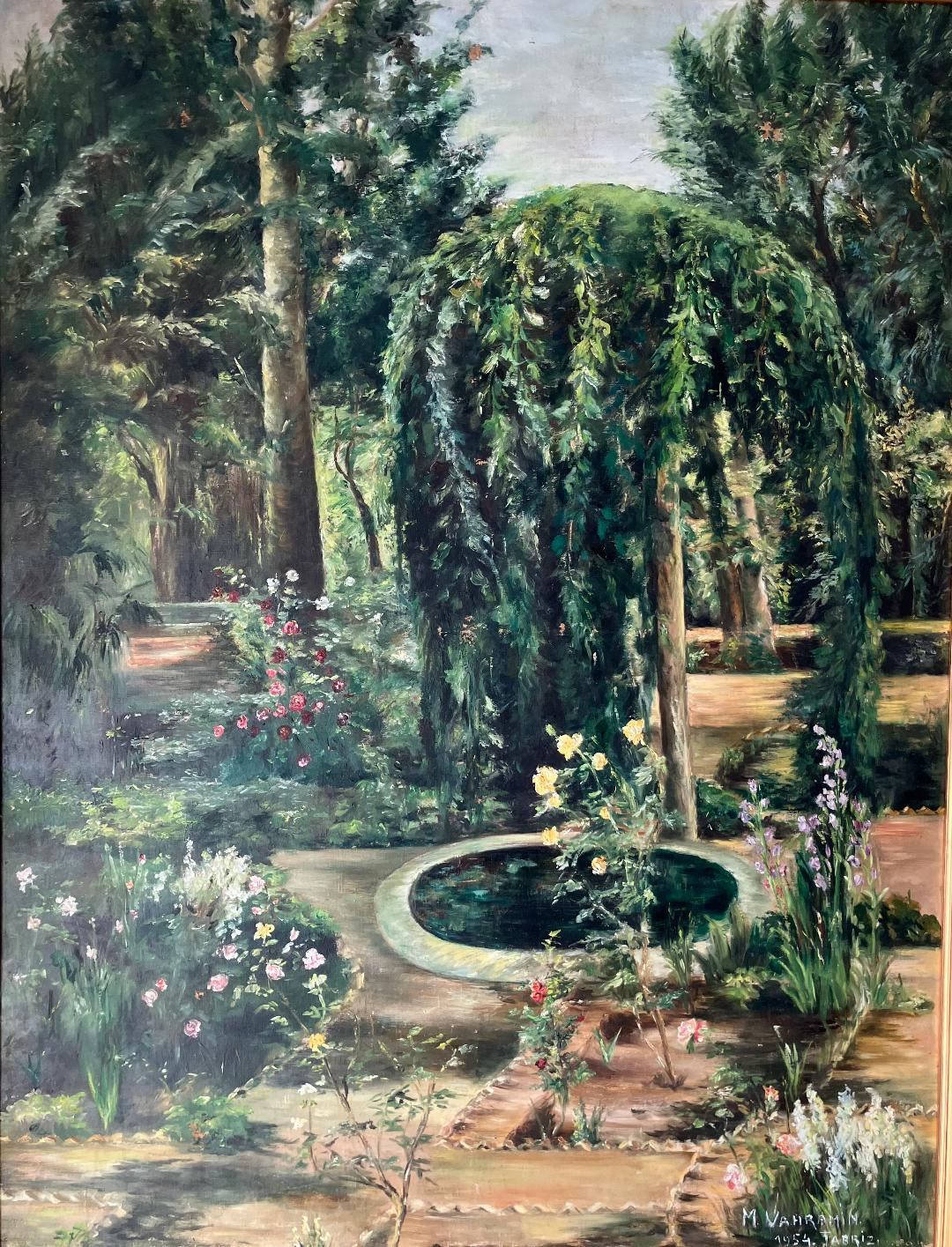
Painting of Boudaghian's Garden in Tabriz by Marousia Vahramian. Signed as M.Vahramian and dated 1954. 86.5cm wide x 101.5cm height

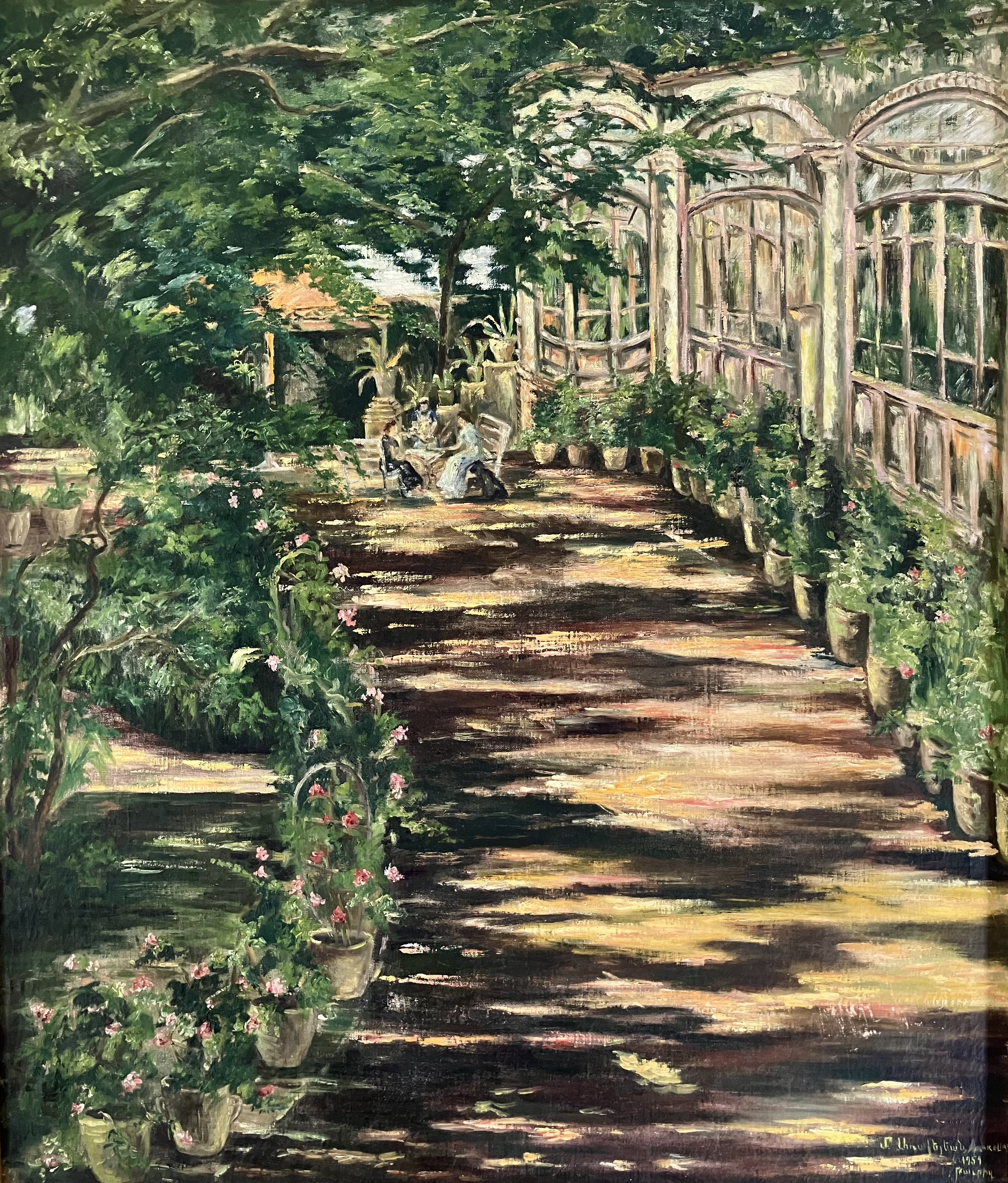
Painting of Boudaghian's garden in Tabriz by Marousia Vahramian- signed M Arakelian and dated 1951. 75cm wide x 100cm height

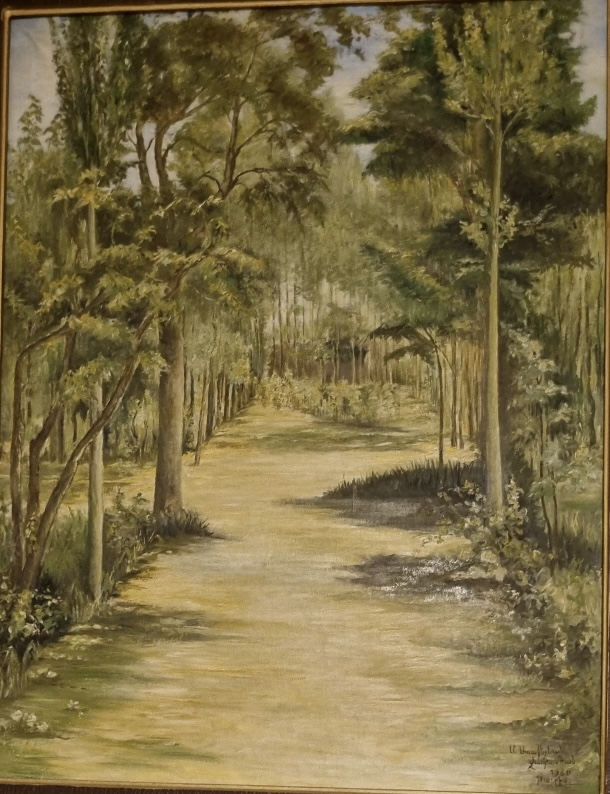
Woodland signed M.Arakelian- Vahramian dated 1960, Tabriz

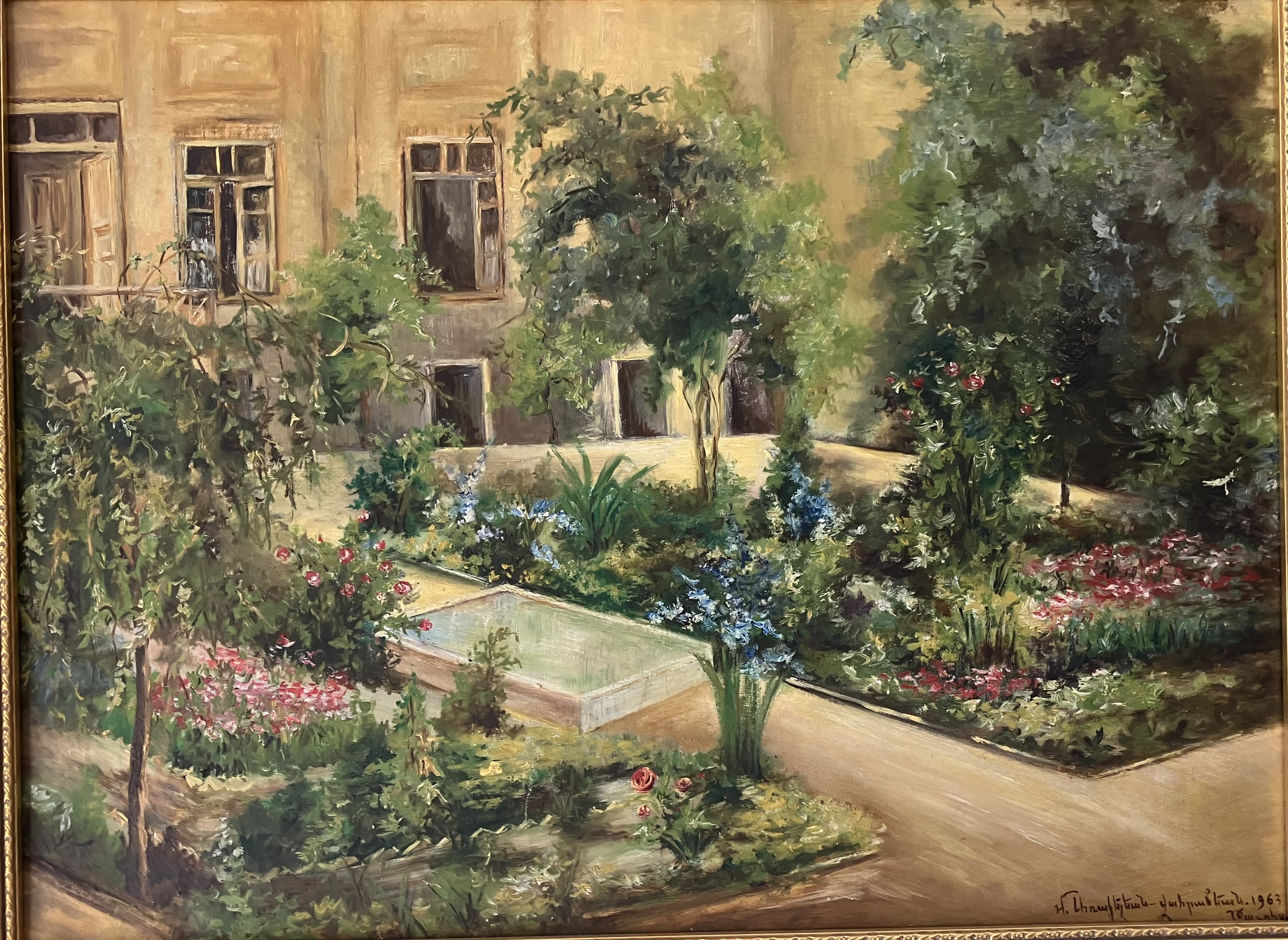
Samuel Hovhanessian's garden in Tabriz signed Marousia Vahramian 1963. 44cm width x 59cm height

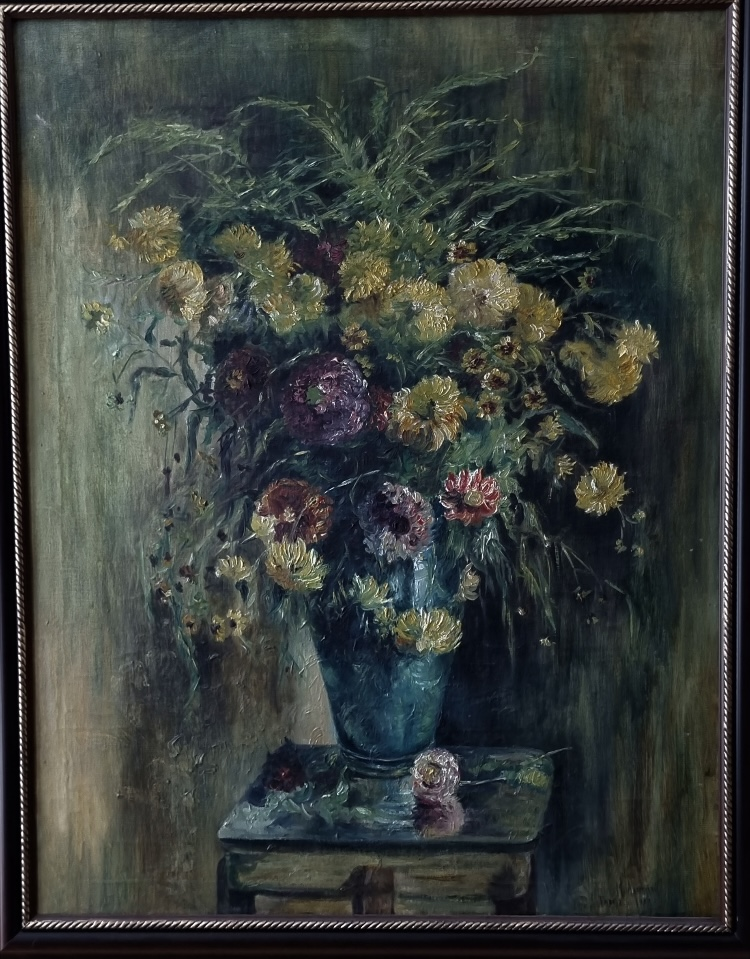
Chrysanthemums with asparagus fern in a blue vase signed Marousia Arakelian and dated pre 1950. 68cm wide x 89cm height

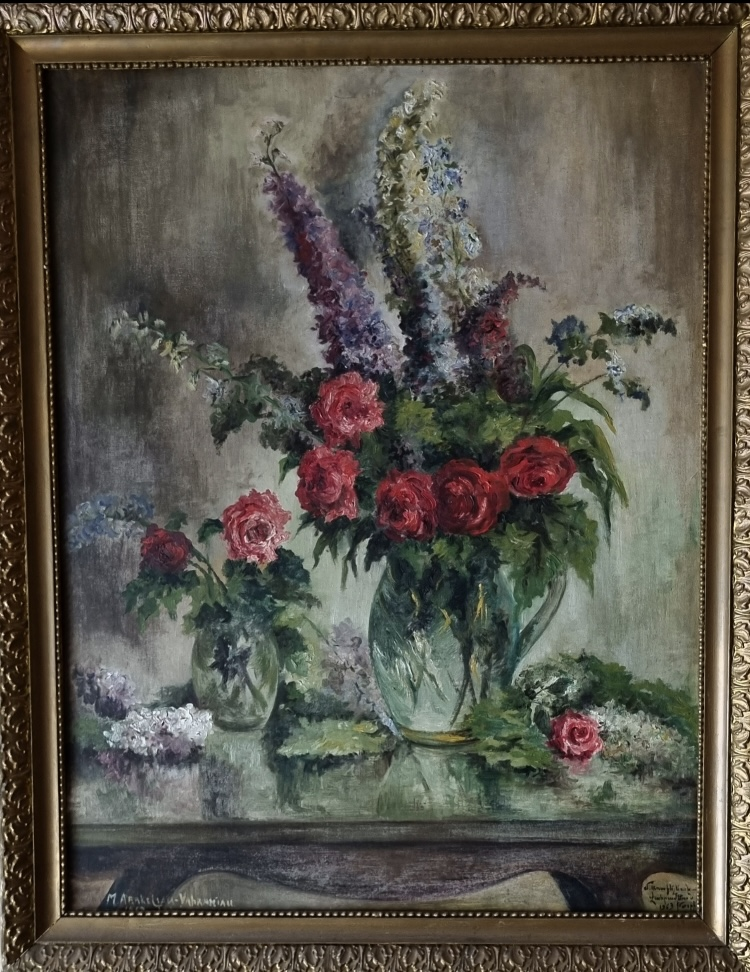
Roses and lilacs arranged in a glass jar signed by Marousia Vahramian and dated 1963. 68cm wide x 89cm height
