= Mohammad Reza Hakimzadeh =

Iranian physician and philanthropist

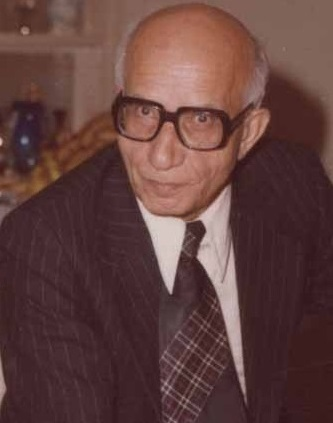
- Born: 15 March 1915; Lahijan, Iran
- Died: 25 October 1979 (aged 64)
- Occupations: physician and philanthropist
- Known for: father of nursing homes for the disabled and the elderly in Iran
- Notable work: Kahrizak Charity Organization

Mohammad Reza Hakimzadeh Lahiji (Persian: محمّدرضا حکیم‌زادهٔ لاهیجی; 15 March 1915 in Lahijan – 25 October 1979 in Tehran) was an Iranian physician and philanthropist. He is the founder of Iran's first nursing home in Rasht and also the Kahrizak Charity Organization. He is considered the father of nursing homes for the disabled and the elderly in Iran.

== Life ==
Mohammad Reza Hakimzadeh Lahiji was born on March 15, 1915, in the Gharib Abad neighborhood of Lahijan.

In his youth, he worked as a nail seller, carpenter, builder, and local investor. For the first time, in response to his charitable concerns, he built the first school in his hometown of Gharib Abad, Lahijan, with the efforts and cooperation of the people.

After building and operating this school, which is named after him, he once again built an orphanage in the same popular and humane way and with public donations. In addition to Lahijan, this center was also opened in cities near and far 60 years ago. He was also introduced and honored.

In Rasht, with the help of Arsen Minasian, a Christian philanthropist, and using the same method of attracting public participation, Hakimzadeh established a charity organization and founded the Rasht Nursing Home. He went to Tehran and the scope of his activities expanded. He was entrusted with the management of Nejat Hospital. His most important activity, with the help of his friends, was the establishment and foundation of the Kahrizak Nursing Home for the Disabled and the Elderly.

== Death ==
Hakimzadeh died on 25 October 1979 , and was buried in the Kahrizak Nursing Home for the Disabled and the Elderly in Tehran, a charitable place he had founded himself.
