= Ashraf Bahadurzadeh =

Iranian philanthropist; co-founder of Kahrizak Charity Hospital (1925–2017))

Ashraf Ghandhari Bahadurzadeh
- Born: 1925; Mashhad
- Died: 23 February 2017 (aged 91–92); Tehran
- Known for: Co founder Kahrizak Charity Organization

Ashraf Ghandhari Bahadurzadeh (Persian: اشرف قندهاری بهادرزاده; born 1925 in Mashhad – died 23 February 2017 in Tehran) was Iranian charitable woman and one of the first founders of the Kahrizak Charity Organization, the founder of the Benevolent Women's Group and the Mother and Child Home. she dedicated her life and wealth to charity.

== Life ==
Ashraf Ghandhari Bahadurzadeh was born in Mashhad in 1925. she immigrated to tehran with his family at the age of eight and, after marrying at the age of 17, continued her charitable activities that she had started in her father's house. she says:

We attended Quran interpretation classes in the Hussainiyeh neighborhood of the father's house. When the Buin Zahra earthquake occurred in Qazvin, or when Iranians were expelled from Iraq, or when the orphans of Shemiran, who were without families and needed help, were wandering, Hussainiyeh became a center for collecting public donations.

== Kahrizak Charity Organization ==
From 1972 to 1992, she was the chairman of the board of directors of the Kahrizak Charity Organization. she is also the founder and director of the Benevolent Women Group and the chairwoman of the board of directors of the Mother and Child Home Charity. bahadorzadeh founded the Benevolent Women Group in 1973, which currently has more than 4,000 benevolent women working with it on a regular and direct basis throughout the month. she has been involved in numerous charitable activities throughout her life. the Iranian parliament honored Ms. Bahadorzadeh’s efforts.

== Death ==
she died on 23 February 2017, at the age of 91 in Shemiran and rested forever in her home, the Kahrizak Charity Organization, which she had dedicated many years of her life to developing.

== Book ==
The book “Rainbow Lady” is about the biography of Ashraf Gandahari Bahadorzadeh.
