= Kahrizak Charity Organization =

- مؤسسه خیریه کهریزک
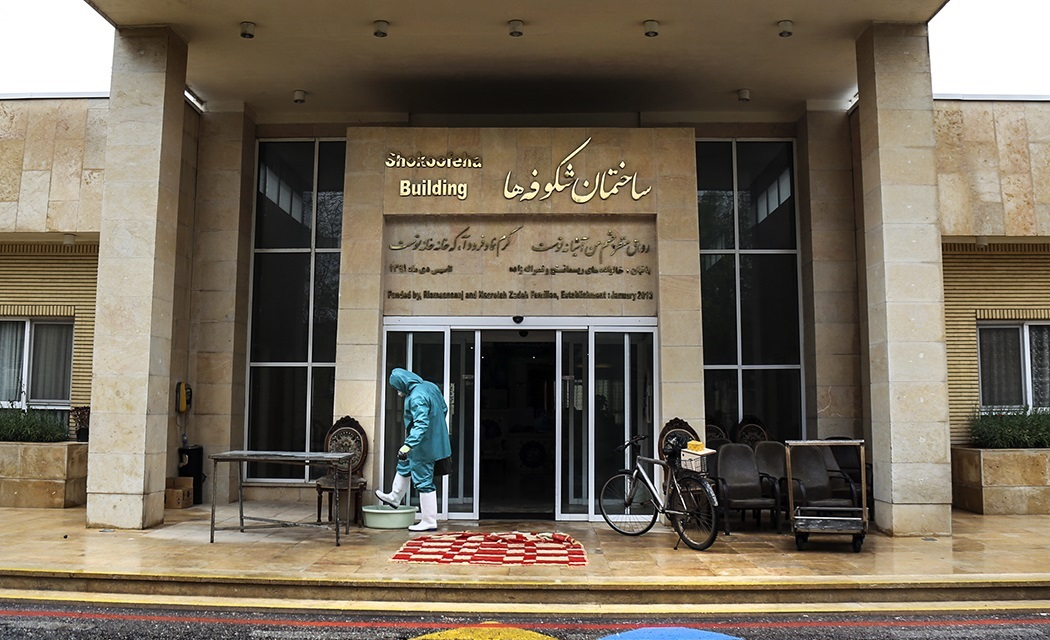
- Blossom Building
- Formation: medical institutions in Iran
- Founded: 24 July 1973
- Founder: Mohammad Reza Hakimzadeh, Ashraf Bahadurzadeh
- Type: Non-governmental organization
- Headquarters: Tehran, Kahrizak
- Website: https://kahrizakcharity.com/

Kahrizak Charity Organization or Kahrizak Nursing Home for the Disabled and the Elderly is one of the largest medical institutions in Iran, located in the south of Tehran, near the city of Kahrizak.

== Facilities ==
Today, the center serves its clients on a land area of 420,000 square meters and with an infrastructure of 160,000 square meters, with health, treatment, rehabilitation, education, and cultural and sports departments.

Throughout the years of Kahrizak Home for the Disabled's activity, this place has remained non-profit and is run with public donations. The place, which has been expanded many times since its establishment, includes homes for the disabled and elderly with the construction of various buildings such as a workshop, a building for MS patients, a sports hall, and green spaces. Many of the existing buildings were built by benefactors who stepped forward and paid for their construction.

On June 22, 2023, the center received consultative status from the United Nations Economic and Social Council (ECOSOC).

== History ==
This sanatorium began its activity in 1972 thanks to the efforts of Mohammad Reza Hakimzadeh, who was the head of Firouzabadi Hospital in the city of Rey at that time.

== Departments ==
It includes a rehabilitation center, a cultural department, and a treatment department. The rehabilitation center is one of the first departments established in the nursing home, and since 1988, it has been providing occupational therapy and physiotherapy services, allowing clients to get out of bed and participate in individual and group activities of the complex.

The treatment department has 80 beds and has rooms with special and separate equipment for patients with infectious diseases, bedsores, skin, intensive care, ICU and CCU. Recently, a special department for patients with MS has also been established, which has an area of 5,000 square meters, two floors and 120 beds.
