= Arthur Minasyan =

Arthur Minasyan may refer to:

- Arthur Minasyan (footballer, born 1977), Armenian footballer
- Arthur Minasyan (footballer, born 1978), Armenian footballer

== See also ==
- Minasyan
- Artur Minosyan (born 1989), Russian footballer
