= Vartan Vahramian =

Armenian composer and artist

- وارطان واهرامیان
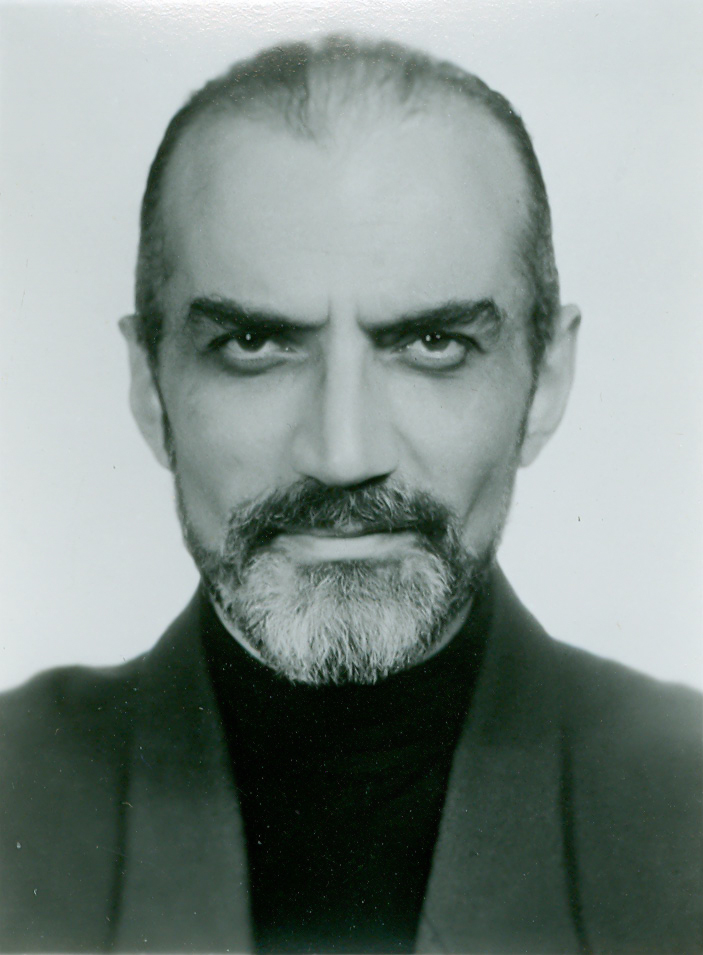
- Born: Vartan Vahramian; 1955 (age 70–71); Tabriz, Iran
- Known for: Music, painting, composer, conducting, film
- Movement: Surrealism
- Father: Grigor Vahramian Gasparbeg

Vartan Vahramian (Persian: وارطان واهرامیان; Armenian: Վարդան Վահրամեան; born 1955) is an Iranian-Armenian composer, artist and painter. He has made musical creations, solo performances as a baritone, and conducted choirs.

== Early life ==
Vartan Vahramian was born in 1955 in Tabriz, East Azerbaijan, Iran. He is the son of artist Grigor Vahramian Gasparbeg; and musician and painter Marousia Vahramian. These two arts of music and painting have manifested themselves equally in his work. His parents were of Armenian descent.

On the occasion of his birthday, a brief biography of Vartan Vahramian was published by the Ministry of Art, Town Hall, Tabriz; published on 18 November 2018.

== Career ==
=== Music ===
Vartan Vahramian has studied harmony under both Iran's and Armenia's maestros. He has 75 musical compositions. Vartan Vahramian has also been the founder and conductor of "Komitas" church choir since 1980. The Komitas Choir have performed at the St. Thaddeus and St. Stephanos Monasteries every year since 1980.

In 2000–2001, his Requiem, Oratorio, and Mass, to mark the 1700th anniversary of Christianity as the state religion in Armenia, was performed by Yerevan's "Komitas" conservatory choir. In 2006, he was invited to Armenia, where his "Looys Aravoti" was performed at the "One Nation, One Culture" festival to great acclaim. "Looys Aravoti", with words by Vahagn Davtyan and "Jah Haverjakan", with words by Varand, have been composed with great inspiration, emotion and devotion. His Mass in contemporary musical style was performed at the "One Nation, One Culture" in Yerevan in 2010.

In 2006 a short film titled The Lonely Tadeh (about St Taddeus's Monastery in Iran) was directed by Hussein Homayounfar and the music was composed by Vartan Vahramian.

In 2011 a short animated film of St. Stepanos Monastery was made, directed by Reza Shams, for cultural use. The music for this film was composed by Vartan Vahramian. The actual video is on YouTube.

On 13 July 2013, the documentary film Maroosya was premiered in Yerevan, Armenia. It was selected as one of the non-competition documentary films to be shown at The Golden Apricot Armenian Film Festival 2013. The accompanying music for this film is composed by Vartan Vahramian. The film was directed by Navid Mikhak. "Maroosya" was screened in Kazan International Film Festival in September 2014 and at Arpa International Film Festival in November 2014.

On 7 January 2020 a video titled- Tabriz Nostalgia in the Paintings of Maroosya was featured in an online newspaper called Tabriz Emrooz. The music accompanying the 6.05-minute video was composed by Vartan Vahramian.

On 16 February 2024, the Islamic Republic of Iranian's Ministry of Culture held an appreciation evening for three musicians at Naji Cinema. One of the musicians was Vartan Vahramian, who was praised for his contribution to music for the last 43 years.

Vartan Vahramian is an Associate Member of the Guild of International Songwriters and Composers, U.K. He has received an award from Catholicos Garegin I for his cultural work. He lives in Tabriz, where he teaches music and painting and continues to work on both his music and painting.

=== Painting ===
Vartan Vahramian is also a talented painter known for his Surrealistic style. His oil paintings have been exhibited extensively in various galleries in Iran and have received coverage both in Iranian and foreign newspapers and media.

His well-known works include Miracle, Check Mate, Death of Apollo, Eve Facing the Serpent, Profound Devotion, Belated Love, Identity Crisis, Betrayal and Longing.

His other major works are: The passage of Time, A Faustian Bargain, Overinflated Ego and Nostalgia. The Nostalgia painting (his latest work) encapsulates the artist's childhood memories, home, his mother's piano, parent's painting studio, the balcony with Corinthian columns designed by his father and more (see gallery).

A novel titled Speaking Cat by Beverley Coghlan was published in February 2015. All the sketches in this book are entirely Vartan Vahramian's creations.

=== Wood engraving ===
Vartan Vahramian is also skilled at wood engraving-mainly on walnut wood.

=== Engraving ===
Vartan Vahramian has also done engraving work on brass, continuing the legacy of his parents.

=== Film ===
In 2006, Vartan Vahramian starred in the award-winning film Tabriz: Images from the Forgotten World. The film also featured a soundtrack composed by Vahramian and was the winner of the Best Foreign Short Screenplay from the Moondance International Film Festival in July 2006. A 33 minute documentary on the life and work of Vartan Vahramian was released in 2002. The documentary was in Persian and produced in Iran.

Vartan Vahramian contributed to the soundtrack for the independent British feature film Masters and Vices (2025). The film was released online on 22 August 2025.

== See also ==
- List of Armenian artists
- List of Armenians
- List of Iranian Armenians
