= Grigor Vahramian Gasparbeg =

Iranian painter

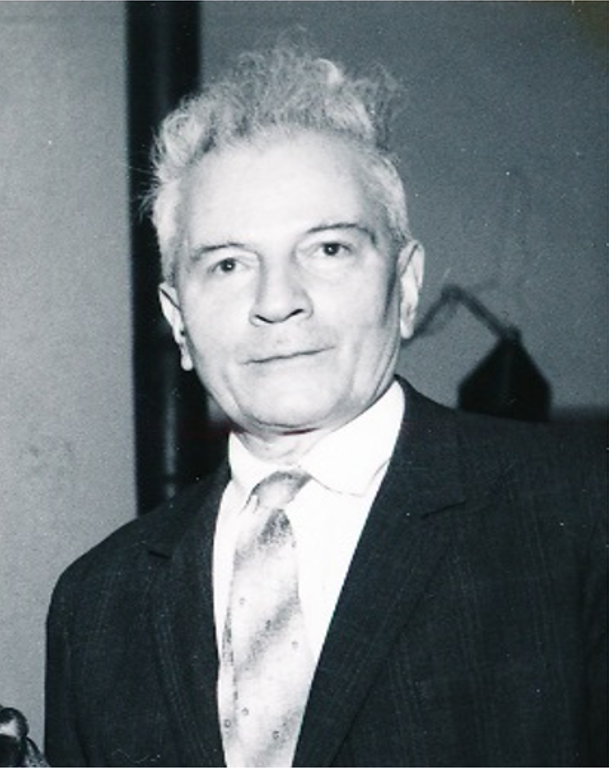
- Born: 1900; Old Nakhchivan
- Died: 1963 (aged 62–63); Tabriz, Iran
- Education: Moscow School of Painting, Sculpture and Architecture

Grigor Vahramian Gasparbeg (Armenian: Գրիգոր Վահրամյան Գասպարբեգ; Russian: Григор Вахрамян Гаспарбек) was an Iranian painter of Armenian descent. Most of Gasparbeg's paintings are in oil and of classical style.

== Early life ==
Gasparbeg was born in 1900 to Stepan and Mariam Gasparbeg in Old Nakhichevan. His parents sent him to the Tbilisi Art School where he studied under Oskar Schmerling (1863–1938) and Yeghishe Tadevosyan (1870–1936). Gasparbeg graduated from the Tbilisi Art School with a 1st in 1923. In the same year, he left Tbilisi and went to Moscow, entering the Moscow School of Painting, Sculpture and Architecture where he studied under Dmitry Kardovsky. Gasparbeg graduated from the school in 1929.

A diploma exhibition of the works of artists who studied under Kardovsky was visited by Anatoly Vasilyevich Lunacharsky, who appreciated the artistry of Gasparbeg's work.

== Career ==
In 1934, Gasparbeg was invited by the Stage Director of the Second Moscow Art Academic Theatre, Ivan Nikolaevich Bersenev (1889–1951) to design the sets and costumes for the play Shahnameh. The play Shahnameh was translated into Russian by playwright Mkrtycha Dzhavanyan.

In 1936, Gasparbeg exhibited his paintings in an exhibition titled "One Hundred Moscow Artists". Following the exhibition, V. Kemenev wrote a review article in the 58th volume (issue 621) of the Literary Newspaper (Literaturnaya Gazeta). Kemenev's article was titled "The beginning of the turn". One-third of the article was devoted to the works of Gasparbeg who Kemenev described as "the brightest talent".

Gasparbeg designed the cover and flyleaf of the Armenian translated version of Gustave Flaubert's Madame Bovary. The book was translated from French to Armenian by Vahe Mickaelyan and was published in Moscow in 1937.

Gasparbeg left the Soviet Union in 1938 and settled in Tabriz, Iran. From 1938 to 1950 Gasparbeg worked at his Home Art Studio where he taught painting and sculpting techniques to various students. In 1950, exhibitions dedicated to the work of Gasparbeg and his students took place in the cities of Tehran, Abadan and Tabriz. One of Gasparbeg's students is Pepi Martin who has exhibited her works in Cyprus.

Gasparbeg began teaching at the Mirak Art School in Tabriz in 1951, and married Marousia Arakelian in 1953. The couple had four children. Gasparbeg's second son is Vartan Vahramian. Gasparbeg died at his Tabriz home on 23 October 1963.

== Legacy ==
Gasparbeg's paintings are held in private collections across the world. Seven of his paintings are currently held in the National Art Gallery of Armenia:

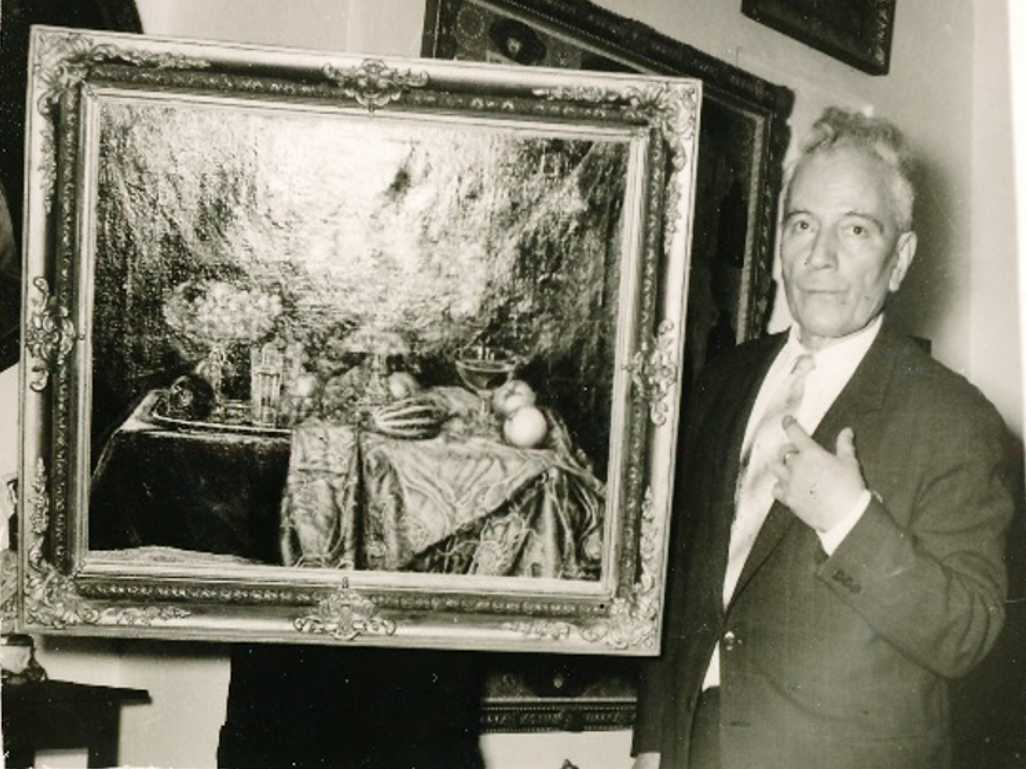
Grigor Vahramian Gasparbeg next to his painting: Still Life. Photo dated 10/10/1961

- Mother's portrait (1928)
- Self-portrait (1932)
- Still life (1936)
- Still life- tea pot and fruit (1937)
- Portrait of Khalatian (1940)
- Portrait of Princess Shams Zamini (1940)
- Still life-fruit and lemons

While living in Tabriz, Gasparbeg designed the plans for a corinthian-style balcony which was built in his place of residence and remains intact to this day.
