= Manuel Berberian =

Iranian-Armenian earth scientist

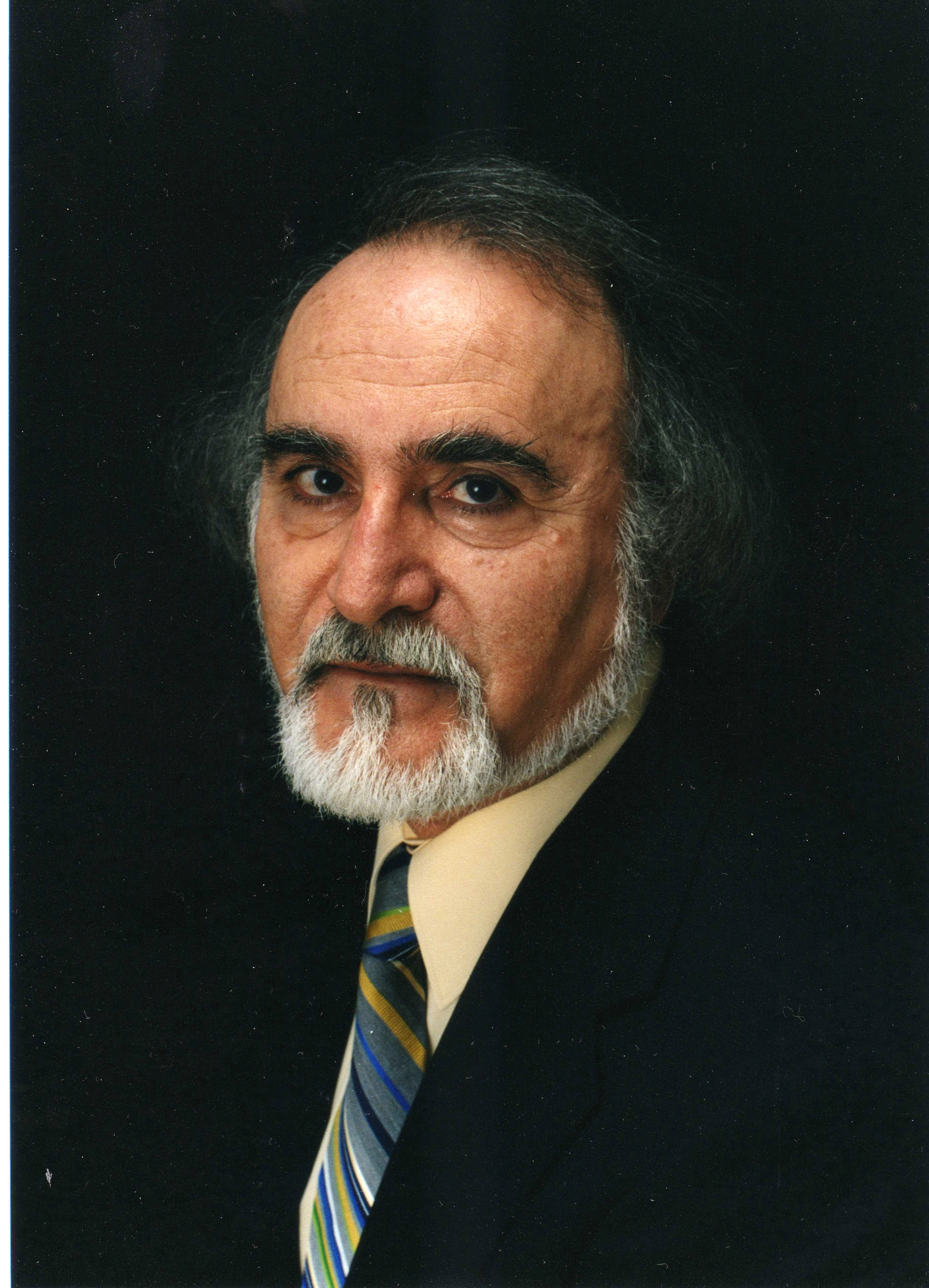
- Manuel Berberian in October 2010
- Born: October 27, 1945 (age 80); Tehran, Imperial State of Iran
- Education: Ph.D. (University of Cambridge, UK)
- Occupations: Earthquake seismology, Geophysics, Active tectonics, Archaeoseismology, environmental geoscience, Professor emeritus
- Website: http://manuelberberian.com/

Manuel Berberian is an Iranian-Armenian earth scientist. He was born on the 27th of October 1945 into an immigrant Armenian family in Tehran. He specializes in earthquake seismology, active faulting and folding, active tectonics, continental tectonics, historical seismicity, archaeoseismicity, earthquake hazard minimization, geological mapping, and environmental science and engineering.

== Biography ==
Berberian was born on October 27, 1945, into an immigrant Armenian family in Tehran. The family had previously fled Armenia during the Armenian genocide. His mother is an Assyrian Christian from Rezaiyeh, Iran.

He attended primary school and high school in Iran, graduating in 1958 and 1964 respectively. He received a B.S. in geology with high honors from the University of Tehran in 1968. Since 1971 he has been engaged in scholarly research, He has taught at the University of Tehran, Tarbiat Modares University, Tehran and Ocean County College in New Jersey. He joined the Geological Survey of Tehran in 1971, and established the Tectonics and Seismotectonics Research Department.

He married his wide Rose in Grenoble, France in 1976. She holds a master's degree in mineralogy from the University of Grenoble. They lived together in Tehran for two years before relocating to the United Kingdom

Berberian received his Ph.D. in earthquake seismology and active tectonics from the University of Cambridge, United Kingdom, in June 1981. His dissertation advisors were Geoffrey King and Dan McKenzie. He completed his dissertation called "Continental Deformation in the Iranian Plateau", becoming the first Armenian and second Iranian graduate of the Earth Science Department of the University of Cambridge. (His wife was the first Iranian woman to complete a Ph.D. at Cambridge).

Since 1990, Barberian, his wife and son are living in the United States.

== Honors ==
2013: The First Iranian and First Armenian Earth Scientist ever honored by the Geological Society of America (GSA) during its 125th Anniversary Annual Conference Special Meeting Dedicated to his over 40-yr of research and contribution to the world Earth Science at Denver, Colorado, United States, in October 2013, Sessions 214 & 291, T188: Tethyan Evolution and Seismotectonics of Southwest Asia (GSA Structural Geology and Tectonics Division; GSA Quaternary Geology & Geomorphology Division; GSA Mineralogy, Geochemistry, Petrology, & Volcanology Division).

2008: A new fossil species of Chondrichthyes (jawed fish) named in honor of Berberian in recognition of his contribution to the tectonic evolution of the Iranian Plateau.
