= Mayis Minasyan =

Iranian footballer

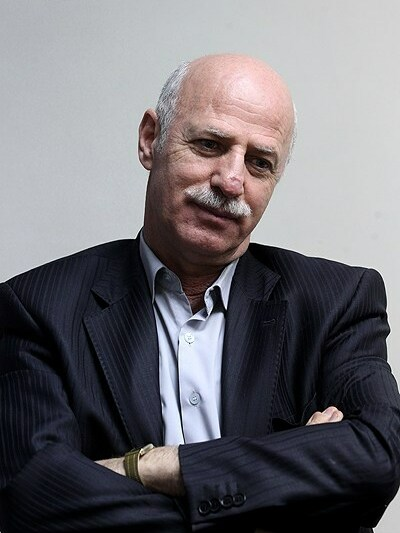
- Mayis Minasian

Personal information
- Full name: Mayis Minasyan
- Position: Midfielder

Senior career*
Years	Team	Apps	(Gls)
1974–1977	PAS Tehran		
1977–1980	Taj		
- Ararat

International career
1975–1978	Iran	3	(0)
- * Club domestic league appearances and goals

Mayis Minasyan (Armenian: Մայիս Մինասյան, Persian: مائیس میناسیان) is a former Iranian footballer. He played as a midfielder for the PAS Tehran, Taj SC and Ararat.

== Honours ==
=== Club ===
Pas

- Iranian Football League: 1974–75
