= Arsen Minasian =

Iranian scientist (1906–1977)

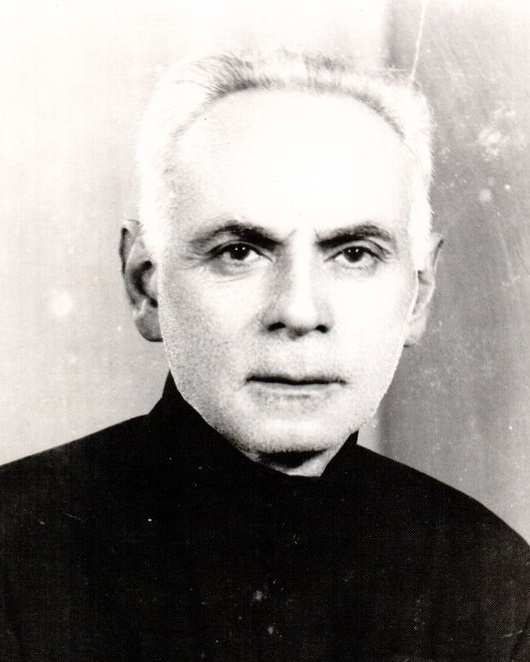
- Born: 1906; Rasht, Gilan province
- Died: April 3, 1977 (age 71)
- Resting place: Rasht
- Occupations: philanthropist, pharmacologist, scientist, and inventor

Arsen Minasian (Persian: آرسن میناسیان ; Armenian: Արսէն Մինասյան; 1906–1977) was an Armenian-Iranian philanthropist, pharmacologist, scientist, and inventor who was born in Rasht, Iran. He was the founder of Gilan's sanatorium in 1954 which is the first modern sanatorium in Iran.
