= 2010 Guangzhou Evergrande F.C. season =

Guangzhou F.C. 2010
- Chairman: Liu Yongzhuo
- Head coach: Lee Jang-Soo; Li Chunman (in name)
- Stadium: Zengcheng Stadium; Century Lotus Stadium; Yuexiushan Stadium
- League One: 1st
- Top goalscorer: Gao Lin (20 goals)
Home colours	Away colours

The 2010 season is the 57th year in Guangzhou Football Club's existence, their 43rd season in the Chinese football league. The club was relegated to China League One in the fallout of a match fixing scandal despite having achieved the ninth place previous season in the Chinese Super League.

== Season reviews ==
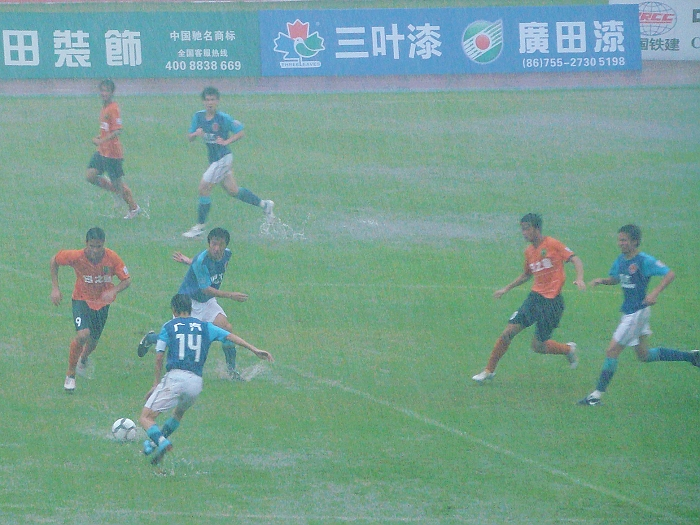
Guangzhou played against Guangzhou rivals Guangdong Sunray Cave in the heavy rain on 29 May 2010

- 26 November 2009, Guangzhou announced that they were to put Lu Lin, Huang Zhiyi, Xu Liang, Zhou Lin, Cao Zhijie, Wang Xiaoshi, Zhang Si and Tan Ning into the transfer list.
- 1 December 2009, Peng Weiguo was appointed as the temporary manager of the club.
- 31 December 2009, the Sports Bureau of Guangzhou took over the club and the club's name was changed into Guangzhou Football Club.
- 12 February 2010, Guangzhou confirmed earlier in the transfer window that they had agreed a club record fee of ¥2.8 million to sell Xu Liang to Beijing Guoan. Bai Lei joined Tianjin Teda for a fee of ¥1.7 million on the same day.
- 21 February 2010, Guangzhou was relegated to China League One in the fallout of a match fixing scandal.
- 28 February 2010, Evergrande Real Estate Group took over the club for a fee of ¥100 million.
- 11 March 2010, China national team striker Gao Lin signed for Guangzhou from Shanghai Shenhua for a reported ¥2 million.

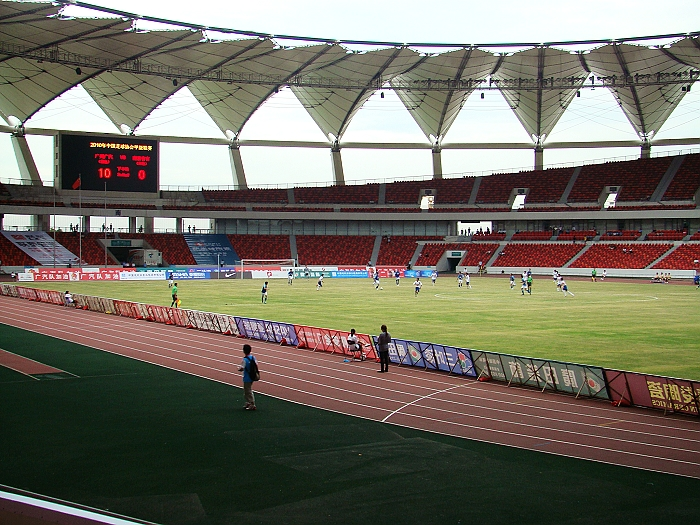
Guangzhou trounced Nanjing Yoyo 10–0 at Century Lotus Stadium.

- 25 March 2010, it was announced that manager Peng Weiguo had been relieved of his duties, with Korean manager Lee Jang-Soo put in charge.
- 3 April 2010, Guangzhou's League One 2010 campaign kicked off with a 3–1 home victory over Beijing Institute of Technology. Gao Lin scored two goals in this match.
- 28 April 2010, Sun Xiang, the first Chinese footballer to play in a UEFA Champions League match with PSV Eindhoven, announced that he would give up to join Australia's A-League side Sydney FC and sign a long-term contract with Guangzhou instead in the summer transfer window.
- 29 May 2010, Guangzhou claimed first place in China League One for the first time this season with a 2–1 home win against Guangzhou rivals Guangdong Sunray Cave.
- 28 June 2010, former China national team captain Zheng Zhi signed for Guangzhou from Celtic on a free transfer.
- 30 June 2010, Guangzhou confirmed that they had signed Muriqui on a four-year deal from Campeonato Brasileiro Série A side Atlético Mineiro with a domestic record fee of US$3.5 million.

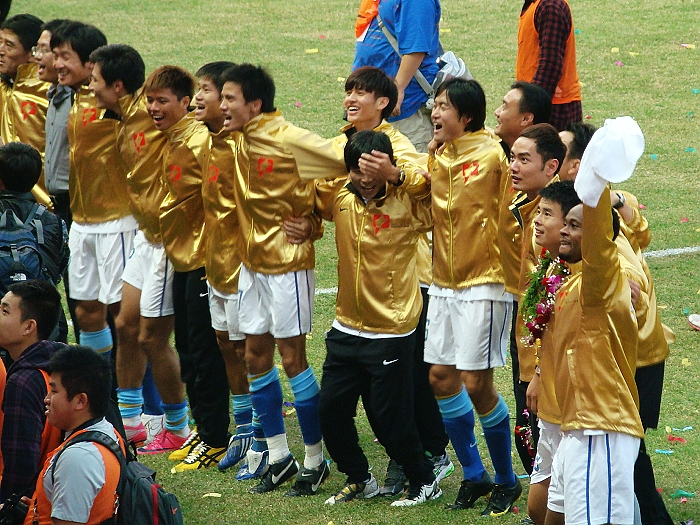
Guangzhou players celebrate their second League One title.

- 21 July 2010, Guangzhou trounced Nanjing Yoyo 10–0 at Century Lotus Stadium, setting a new club record (also a new record in Chinese professional football league) for their biggest ever League win in the process as well as breaking numerous scoring records.
- 25 September 2010, Guangzhou beat Guangdong Sunray Cave 3–2 at Boluo Sports Center and promoted to the Chinese Super League for the 2011 season after Hubei Oriental draw 1–1 with Shanghai Pudong Zobon.
- 16 October 2010, Guangzhou returned to their real home stadium, Yuexiushan Stadium for the first time this season and beat Hubei Oriental International Travel 2–1 in this match.
- 30 October 2010, Guangzhou successfully achieved League One champions for the second time with a 3–1 victory at home to Hunan Billows. Gao Lin's first half hat-trick ensured he finished the season with the League One top scorer, having scored 20 goals, six more than the 14 scored by second-placed Ye Weichao.

== Technical staff ==
Name	Job title
(South Korea) Lee Jang-Soo	Head coach (from 25 Mar 2010)
(China) Qiu Ming	Assistant coach (from 27 Mar 2010)
(South Korea) Kim Yong-Kab	Assistant coach / Fitness coach (from 27 Mar 2010)
(China) Jiang Feng	Assistant coach (from 27 Mar 2010)
(China) Wang Weiman	Goalkeeping coach (from 27 Mar 2010)
(Brazil) Renato Hiroshi	Fitness coach / Physician (from 26 Apr 2010)
(China) Kang Kebao	Team doctor
(China) Li Chunman	Head coach (in name)
(China) Peng Weiguo	Head coach (from 1 Dec 2009 to 24 Mar 2010)
(China) Ye Zhibin	Assistant coach / Fitness coach (from 1 Dec 2009 to 24 Mar 2010)
(China) Zhang Bin	Assistant coach (from 1 Dec 2009 to 24 Mar 2010)
(China) Wu Fang	Assistant coach (from 4 Jan 2010 to 30 June 2010)
(China) Tian Ye	Goalkeeping coach (from 20 Dec 2009 to 24 Mar 2010)
(China) Mai Zhiyuan	Physician (from 1 Dec 2009 to 30 June 2010)

== Squad ==
Note: Flags indicate national team as defined under FIFA eligibility rules; some limited exceptions apply. Players may hold more than one non-FIFA nationality.

No.	Pos.	Nation	Player
1	GK	CHN	Zhi Xinhua
2	DF	CHN	Li Zhihai (captain)
3	MF	CHN	Li Yan
4	DF	AUS	John Tambouras (to June)
5	DF	CHN	Dai Xianrong
6	MF	CHN	Hu Zhaojun
7	MF	CHN	Feng Junyan
8	MF	BRA	Eduardo Delani
9	FW	CAN	Charles Gbeke
10	MF	NGA	Gabriel Melkam
11	MF	CHN	Yang Yihu
12	GK	CHN	Dong Chunyu
13	DF	CHN	Tang Dechao
14	DF	CHN	Li Jianhua (vice-captain)
15	MF	CHN	Xu Weilong
16	MF	CHN	Xu Deen
17	MF	CHN	Cai Yaohui
18	DF	CHN	Chen Jianlong

No.	Pos.	Nation	Player
19	DF	CHN	Zhang Hongnan
20	FW	CHN	Ni Bo
21	MF	CHN	Peng Shaoxiong
22	GK	CHN	Li Shuai
23	MF	CHN	Li Zhilang
24	MF	CHN	Shi Hongjun
25	DF	CHN	Guo Zichao
26	MF	CHN	Wu Pingfeng
27	DF	CHN	Tu Dongxu
28	MF	CHN	Zheng Zhi (from July)
29	FW	CHN	Gao Lin
30	MF	CHN	Lu Lin
31	FW	BRA	Muriqui (from July)
32	DF	CHN	Sun Xiang (from July)
33	DF	CHN	Huang Zhiyi
34	DF	CHN	Wang Xiaoshi
35	DF	CHN	Zhou Lin

== Transfers ==
=== Winter ===
In

No.	Pos.	Nation	Player
4	DF	AUS	John Tambouras (from North Queensland Fury)
6	MF	CHN	Hu Zhaojun (loan extended from Dalian Shide)
8	MF	BRA	Eduardo Delani (from Vejle Boldklub)
9	FW	CAN	Charles Gbeke (from Vancouver Whitecaps)
10	MF	NGA	Gabriel Melkam (from Changchun Yatai)
15	MF	CHN	Xu Weilong (loan return from Guangdong Sunray Cave)
18	DF	CHN	Chen Jianlong (loan return from Guangdong Sunray Cave)
21	MF	CHN	Peng Shaoxiong (loan return from Guangdong Sunray Cave)
25	DF	CHN	Guo Zichao (loan return from Guangdong Sunray Cave)
29	FW	CHN	Gao Lin (from Shanghai Shenhua)
––	FW	CHN	Li Jiaqi (loan return from Guangdong Sunray Cave)
––	FW	CHN	Zhu Pengfei (loan return from Guangdong Sunray Cave)

Out

No.	Pos.	Nation	Player
5	DF	PER	Ismael Alvarado (to Universidad César Vallejo)
8	MF	BRA	Diogo Barcelos (to SER Caxias)
9	FW	HON	Luis Ramírez (to Hangzhou Greentown)
10	FW	BRA	Diego Barcelos (to C.D. Nacional)
11	MF	CHN	Li Benjian (loan return to Tianjin Teda)
12	GK	CHN	Zhang Si (to Beijing BIT)
14	MF	CHN	Cao Zhijie (Released)
20	MF	CHN	Xu Liang (to Beijing Guoan)
28	DF	CHN	Bai Lei (to Tianjin Teda)
29	DF	CHN	Cui Wei (loan return to Changchun Yatai)
––	FW	CHN	Ye Weichao (loan extended to Guangdong Sunray Cave)
––	DF	CHN	Huang Jiaqiang (loan extended to Guangdong Sunray Cave)
––	DF	CHN	Zhang Jian (loan extended to Guangdong Sunray Cave)

=== Summer ===
In

No.	Pos.	Nation	Player
28	MF	CHN	Zheng Zhi (from Celtic FC)
31	FW	BRA	Muriqui (from Clube Atlético Mineiro)
32	DF	CHN	Sun Xiang (from Shanghai Shenhua)

Out

No.	Pos.	Nation	Player
4	DF	AUS	John Tambouras (Released)
––	FW	CHN	Zhu Pengfei (loan to Tianjin Songjiang)

== Friendly matches ==
Pre-season
Date	Opponents	H / A	Result	Scorers
2009-12-23	Guangdong Sunray Cave	H	1–0	
2010-01-09	(Hong Kong) Shatin SA	H	1–1	Zhu Pengfei
2010-01-22	Guangdong Sunray Cave	A	1–0	Dai Xianrong
2010-01-27	Guangdong Sunray Cave	A	1–1	
2010-01-31	Qingdao Jonoon	N	3–1	
2010-01-31	Qingdao Jonoon	N	0–1	
2010-02-02	Chongqing Lifan	N	0–1	
2010-02-02	Dalian Shide	N	2–1	
2010-02-04	Hunan Billows	N	2–2	Ni Bo, Ye Weichao
2010-02-04	Liaoning Whowin	N	3–2	Wu Pingfeng, Li Yan (2)
2010-02-06	Yanbian FC	N	1–1	
2010-02-06	(South Korea) Universities Team	N	2–2	Wu Pingfeng, Li Yan
2010-02-20	Guangdong Sunray Cave	H	3–0	
2010-02-24	Guangdong Sunray Cave	H	2–0	Joel(Own Goal)，？
2010-02-27	Guangdong Sunray Cave	H	3–1	Li Yan, Gbeke, Yang Yihu
2010-03-15	Shenzhen Ruby	N	0–1	Huang Fengtao
2010-03-19	Nanchang Hengyuan	H	1–1	Gao Lin
2010-03-23	Tianjin Teda	A	0–1	
2010-03-27	Guangdong Sunray Cave	A	3–1	Melkam, Gao Lin, Wu Pingfeng

Summer break
Date	Opponents	H / A	Result	Scorers
2010-06-18	Hangzhou Greentown	H	1–3	Lu Lin
2010-06-20	Hangzhou Greentown	H	3–2	
2010-07-03	Hangzhou Greentown	A	0–1	
2010-07-06	Hangzhou Greentown	A	2–2	Lu Lin, Zheng Zhi
2010-07-12	Guangdong Sunray Cave	H	5–1	Lu Lin, Chen Jianlong, Gao Lin, Gbeke
2010-10-02	Guangdong Sunray Cave	A	2–3	Heo Jae-Won (on trial), Delani
2010-10-08	Shenzhen Ruby	A	2–1	Song Chen (own goal), Tang Dechao
2010-10-11	Hangzhou Greentown	H	3–2	Gbeke(2), Muriqui
2010-10-12	Hangzhou Greentown	H	0–1	
2010-10-13	Hangzhou Greentown	H	1–2	Hu Zhaojun

== League One ==
=== Result summary ===
Overall								Home						Away					
Pld	W	D	L	GF	GA	GD	Pts	W	D	L	GF	GA	GD	W	D	L	GF	GA	GD
24	17	6	1	61	21	+40	57	9	2	1	34	13	+21	8	4	0	27	8	+19

=== League table ===
Pos	Team	Pld	W	D	L	GF	GA	GD	Pts	Promotion or relegation
1	Guangzhou Evergrande (C, P)	24	17	6	1	61	21	+40	57	Promotion to Chinese Super League
2	Chengdu Blades (P)	24	17	5	2	56	15	+41	56	Promotion to Chinese Super League
3	Yanbian F.C.	24	12	4	8	30	21	+9	40	
4	Shanghai East Asia	24	9	10	5	25	18	+7	37 (Note: Shanghai, 4 pts; Hubei, 1 pt)	
5	Hubei Luyin	24	10	7	7	30	24	+6	37	

Updated to match(es) played on 30 October 2010. Source: League One table
Rules for classification: 1st points; 2nd head-to-head points; 3rd head-to-head goal difference; 4th head-to-head goals scored; 5th goal difference; 6th goals scored; 7th disciplinary points (1 point for each yellow card, 3 points for each red card.)
(C) Champions; (P) Promoted

=== Positions by round ===
Round	1	2	3	4	5	6	7	8	9	10	11	12	13	14	15	16	17	18	19	20	21	22	23	24	25	26
Ground	H	A	–	H	A	H	A	H	A	H	A	H	A	A	H	–	A	H	A	H	A	H	A	H	A	H
Result	W	D	–	L	D	W	W	W	D	W	D	W	W	W	W	–	W	D	W	D	W	W	W	W	W	W
Position	2	2	4	8	9	5	2	3	2	1	3	2	1	1	1	2	2	2	1	1	1	1	1	1	1	1

W = Win; D = Draw; L = Loss

=== Matches ===
Match won	Match drawn	Match lost

All times GMT+8.

3 April 2010	Guangzhou	3–1	Beijing BIT	Zengcheng
15:00	Gao Lin 23' (pen.), 45+1'; Tang Dechao 30'		Nagel 90'	Stadium: Zengcheng Stadium; Attendance: 8,000; Referee: Dong Kun (Xi'an)

10 April 2010	Shanghai Zobon	3–3	Guangzhou	Shanghai
15:00	Wang Jianwen 34' (pen.); Júnior 65', 76'		Gbeke 29', 43'; Gao Lin 83'	Stadium: Yuanshen Stadium; Attendance: 7,500; Referee: Li Haihe (Beijing)

22 April 2010	Guangzhou	2–3	Shenyang Dongjin	Zengcheng
15:00	Li Yan 9'; Wu Pingfeng 72'		Li Gen 45+1'; Gao Wanguo 61'; Zhang Hao 78'	Stadium: Zengcheng Stadium; Attendance: 7,000; Referee: Guo Baolong (Qingdao)

25 April 2010	Chengdu Blades	0–0	Guangzhou	Chengdu
15:30				Stadium: Jinniu Stadium; Attendance: 3,000; Referee: Hei Xiaohu (Shaanxi)

1 May 2010	Guangzhou	1–0	Anhui Jiufang	Zengcheng
15:00	Feng Junyan 80'			Stadium: Zengcheng Stadium; Attendance: 8,000; Referee: Zhong Jun (Wuhan)

7 May 2010	Shanghai East Asia	1–3	Guangzhou	Shanghai
19:45	Wang Jiayu 12'		Peng Shaoxiong 8'; Gao Lin 27', 78'	Stadium: Shanghai Stadium; Attendance: 10,000; Referee: Li Haihe (Beijing)

15 May 2010	Guangzhou	3–1	Beijing Baxy	Zengcheng
15:00	Gao Lin 22' (pen.), 69'; Li Jianhua 45+1'		Zhang Shuang 56'	Stadium: Zengcheng Stadium; Attendance: 8,000; Referee: Shi Zhenlu (Changchun)

22 May 2010	Yanbian FC	0–0	Guangzhou	Yanji
15:00				Stadium: Yanji People's Stadium; Attendance: 20,000; Referee: Liu Yang (Yunnan)

29 May 2010	Guangzhou	2–1	Guangdong Sunray Cave	Zengcheng
15:00	Gao Lin 44'; Gbeke 64'		Ye Weichao 77'	Stadium: Zengcheng Stadium; Attendance: 6,000; Referee: Li Haihe (Beijing)

17 July 2010	Hubei Orient	1–1	Guangzhou	Wuhan
16:00	Chen Hao 66'		Gbeke 57'	Stadium: Xinhua Road; Attendance: 12,000; Referee: Li Pan (Sichuan)

21 July 2010	Guangzhou	10–0	Nanjing Yoyo	Foshan
16:00	Gbeke 19'; Muriqui 44', 57', 64', 65'; Feng Junyan 60'; Gao Lin 72', 82' (pen.); Shi Hongjun 78'; Zheng Zhi 80'			Stadium: Century Lotus Stadium; Referee: Wu Bo (Chongqing)

24 July 2010	Hunan Billows	0–1	Guangzhou	Changsha
16:00			Muriqui 84'	Stadium: Hunan People's Stadium; Referee: Chen Gang (Shanghai)

31 July 2010	Beijing BIT	0–3	Guangzhou	Beijing
15:30			Zheng Zhi 1'; Gbeke 55', 88'	Stadium: Eastern Athletic Field; Referee: Zhang Long (Xi'an)

7 August 2010	Guangzhou	3–1	Shanghai Zobon	Foshan
19:30	Gbeke 15'; Gao Lin 27'; Zheng Zhi 81'		Huang Jie 31'	Stadium: Century Lotus Stadium; Attendance: 20,000; Referee: Hu Yadong (Liaoning)

21 August 2010	Shenyang Dongjin	0–2	Guangzhou	Shenyang
15:00			Gao Lin 37', 58'	Stadium: Shenyang Olympic Stadium; Referee: Liu Yang (Yunnan)

25 August 2010	Guangzhou	2–2	Chengdu Blades	Foshan
16:00	Muriqui 15'; Gao Lin 40'		Wang Cun 45+1'; Zhang Yuan 72'	Stadium: Century Lotus Stadium; Referee: Bao Lei (Wuhan)

28 August 2010	Anhui Jiufang	0–4	Guangzhou	Hefei
16:00			Gbeke 29'; Wu Pingfeng 38'; Muriqui 58'; Feng Junyan 71'	Stadium: Hefei Olympic Stadium; Referee: Wu Liying (Tianjin)

4 September 2010	Guangzhou	1–1	Shanghai East Asia	Foshan
15:00	Li Jianhua 45+1'		Wang Jiayu 27'	Stadium: Century Lotus Stadium

12 September 2010	Beijing Baxy	1–2	Guangzhou	Beijing
19:30	Zhang Shuang 44'		Gao Lin 52', 62'	Stadium: Chaoyang Sports Center

18 September 2010	Guangzhou	2–1	Yanbian	Foshan
15:00	Hu Zhaojun 34'; Sun Xiang 58'		Han Qingsong 50'	Stadium: Century Lotus Stadium

25 September 2010	Guangdong Sunray Cave	2–3	Guangzhou	Boluo
15:00	Giovane 53'; Awal 62'		Muriqui 9', 82'; Zheng Zhi 72'	Stadium: Boluo Sports Center

16 October 2010	Guangzhou	2–1	Hubei Oriental	Guangzhou
15:00	Gao Lin 21' (pen.); Muriqui 48'		Zhou Liao 25'	Stadium: Yuexiushan Stadium; Referee: Hei Xiaohu

23 October 2010	Nanjing Yoyo	0–5	Guangzhou	Nanjing
15:00			Zheng Zhi 11'; Muriqui 44', 58' (pen.), 78'; Melkam 76'	Stadium: Jiangning Sports Center

30 October 2010	Guangzhou	3–1	Hunan Billows	Guangzhou
15:00	Gao Lin 6', 23', 38'		Liu Yusheng 8'	Stadium: Yuexiushan Stadium; Referee: Zhang Miao

== Squad stats ==
Updated to games played on 30 October 2010.
To see the table ordered by certain column title click that column header icon once or twice.

Player	Pos	Apps	Starts	Goals	(yellow card) YC	(red card) RC
(China) Li Jianhua	DF	24	24	2	2	0
(China) Li Shuai	GK	24	24	0	1	0
(China) Wu Pingfeng	MF	24	23	2	2	0
(China) Gao Lin	FW	23	23	20	3	0
(China) Li Yan	MF	23	23	1	5	0
(China) Feng Junyan	MF	21	20	3	7	0
(Canada) Charles Gbeke	FW	21	18	9	3	0
(China) Tang Dechao	DF	19	16	1	6	0
(Nigeria) Gabriel Melkam	DF	18	18	1	4	0
(China) Hu Zhaojun	MF	16	5	1	3	0
(China) Li Zhihai	DF	14	10	0	2	0
(Brazil) Muriqui	FW	14	14	13	1	0
(China) Sun Xiang	DF	14	13	1	2	0
(China) Li Zhilang	MF	12	7	0	2	0
(China) Peng Shaoxiong	MF	11	5	1	3	0
(China) Zheng Zhi	MF	11	9	5	3	1
(China) Dai Xianrong	DF	8	4	0	0	0
(China) Lu Lin	MF	7	2	0	1	0
(China) Chen Jianlong	DF	5	3	0	1	0
(China) Yang Yihu	FW	4	0	0	2	0
(China) Ni Bo	FW	4	0	0	0	0
(Brazil) Eduardo Delani	MF	3	1	0	0	0
(Australia) John Tambouras	DF	2	2	0	0	0
(China) Shi Hongjun	MF	2	0	1	0	0
(China) Guo Zichao	DF	2	0	0	0	0
(China) Xu Deen	MF	2	0	0	0	0
(China) Wang Xiaoshi	DF	1	0	0	0	0
Total	––	––	––	61	53	1

No appearances player not listed.
