= Chen Jianlong =

Chinese footballer

Chen Jianlong 陈建龙
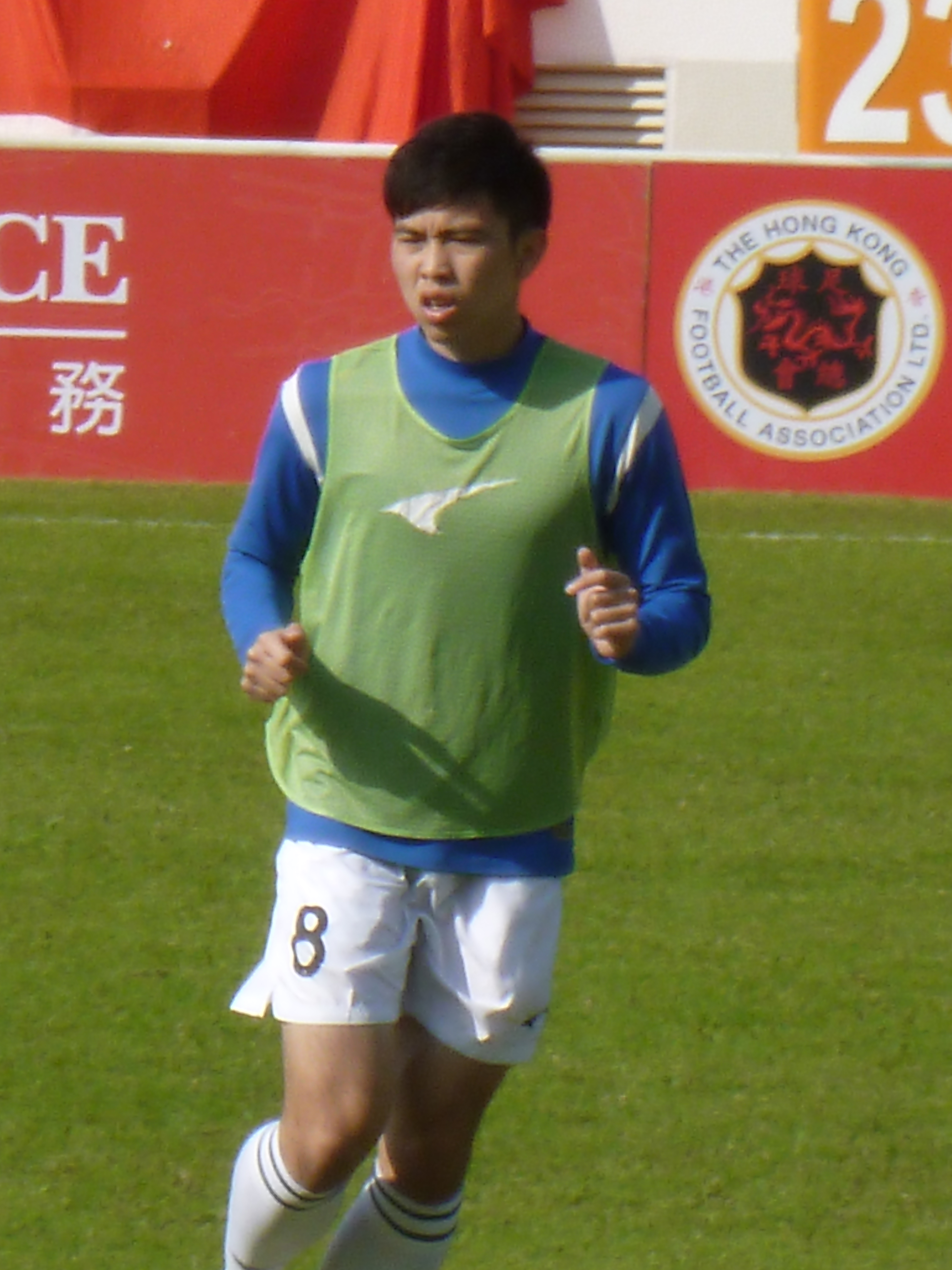
- Chen in 2013

Personal information
- Date of birth: 14 May 1989 (age 37)
- Place of birth: Maoming, Guangdong, China
- Height: 1.78 m (5 ft 10 in)
- Position: Defender

Team information
- Current team: Guangzhou Dandelion Alpha
- Number: 23

Youth career
- 2005–2009: Guangzhou Pharmaceutical

Senior career*
Years	Team	Apps	(Gls)
2007–2009	→ Guangdong Sunray Cave (loan)	10	(0)
2010–2012	Guangzhou Evergrande	5	(0)
2012	→ Shanghai Shenxin (loan)	0	(0)
2013–2018	Meizhou Hakka	61	(4)
2020	Meizhou Qiuxiang		
2023-	Guangzhou Dandelion Alpha		

Managerial career
- 2023-: Guangzhou Dandelion Alpha (assistant)
- * Club domestic league appearances and goals as of 3 November 2018

Chen Jianlong (simplified Chinese: 陈建龙; traditional Chinese: 陳建龍; pinyin: Chén Jiànlóng; born 14 May 1989) is a Chinese professional footballer who plays as a defender for Guangzhou Dandelion Alpha in the China League Two.

== Career ==
Chen played for the Guangzhou Pharmaceutical youth team before going on loan to third-tier club Guangdong Sunray Cave to being his senior career in the 2007 Chinese league season. With Guangdong, he soon went on to establish himself as a regular within their side and by the 2008 league season he was already the captain of the team that won promotion to the second tier after the club came runners-up within the 2008 Chinese League Two division. By his third season, he had lost his captaincy to Joel, but established the club as mid-table regulars before he returned to Guangzhou in December 2009 after three seasons. Back at Guangzhou he made his debut for them on 3 April 2010, in a 3–1 home win against Beijing Institute of Technology.

With Guangzhou, he was part of the squad that won the 2010 Chinese League One division and promotion where he also won the 2011 Chinese Super League title, however throughout this he mainly played a small part as a squad player. To gain more playing time, Chen was loaned to Chinese Super League side Shanghai Shenxin on 5 January 2012.

Chen moved to China League Two side Meizhou Hakka in 2013.

In 2023, Chen joined Guangzhou Dandelion Alpha as player and assistant coach.

== Honours ==
Guangzhou Evergrande

- Chinese Super League: 2011
- China League One: 2010

Meizhou Hakka

- China League Two: 2015
