= Zheng Zhi =

Chinese footballer

Zheng Zhi 郑智
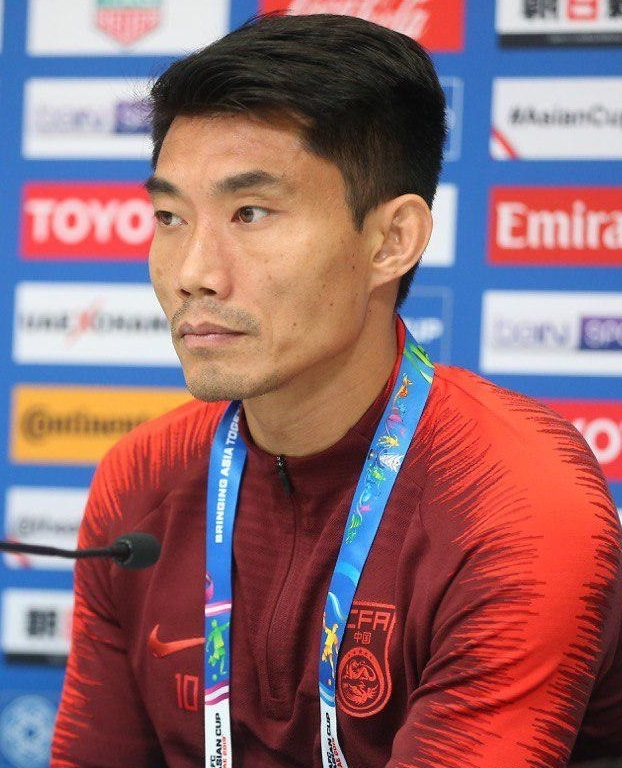
- Zheng with China at the 2019 AFC Asian Cup

Personal information
- Date of birth: 20 August 1980 (age 46)
- Place of birth: Shenyang, Liaoning, China
- Height: 1.80 m (5 ft 11 in)
- Position: Midfielder

Team information
- Current team: Qingdao West Coast (head coach)

Youth career
- 1990–2000: Liaoning FC

Senior career*
Years	Team	Apps	(Gls)
1998–2000	Liaoning FC	4	(0)
2001–2004	Shenzhen Jianlibao	82	(13)
2005–2007	Shandong Luneng Taishan	45	(31)
2007	→ Charlton Athletic (loan)	12	(1)
2007–2009	Charlton Athletic	55	(8)
2009–2010	Celtic	16	(1)
2010–2022	Guangzhou FC	226	(15)
Total		440	(69)

International career
1999	China U23	2	(0)
2002–2019	China	108	(15)

Managerial career
- 2019: Guangzhou Evergrande (caretaker)
- 2021: Guangzhou FC (caretaker)
- 2022–2023: Guangzhou FC
- 2023–2025: China (assistant)
- 2026-: Qingdao West Coast
Medal record
Representing China
Men's football
AFC Asian Cup
Silver medal – second place	2004 China	Team
EAFF Championship
Bronze medal – third place	2003 Japan	Team
Silver medal – second place	2013 South Korea	Team
Silver medal – second place	2015 China	Team
- * Club domestic league appearances and goals

Zheng Zhi
- Simplified Chinese: 郑智
- Traditional Chinese: 鄭智
Transcriptions
Standard Mandarin
- Hanyu Pinyin: Zhèng Zhì
- IPA: [ʈʂə̂ŋ ʈʂɻ̩̂]

Zheng Zhi (Chinese: 郑智; pinyin: Zhèng Zhì; born 20 August 1980) is a Chinese professional football manager and former player. As a player, Zheng played most of his career for Chinese Super League club Guangzhou FC, becoming their captain and serving also as their caretaker manager in two stints.

After starting his career as a defender, Zheng was later moved into a central midfield role by then head coach Zhu Guanghu at Shenzhen Jianlibao and experienced immediate success there by winning the 2004 league title with the club. A move to Shandong Luneng Taishan saw a prolific goal scoring period in his career and he soon became the captain of the Chinese national team, which then led to moves to Charlton Athletic and Celtic. He moved back to China in 2010 and joined what was then Guangzhou Evergrande, making over 300 appearances as captain while helping the club win all major trophies a Chinese club could compete for, including Chinese Super League for a record eight times and the AFC Champions League twice, the only Chinese club to have ever won the continental title.

== Club career ==
=== Early career ===
Zheng Zhi started his football career in 1990 playing for various Liaoning youth academies before playing for Liaoning Liaoqing in 1998 in the China League Two, starting out playing as a defender. In 2000, Liaoning Youth were involved in a legal battle between Yixing Industrial Co., Ltd. and Liaoning Sports School for the ownership of the club that saw all their assets frozen, including player transfer rights. This saw Zheng spend a year without playing professional football. In 2001, he was loaned to top-tier club Shenzhen Jianlibao who were coached by then manager Zhu Guanghu, his former manager during his time with the Chinese under-23 national team. He transferred to the club in November 2001 for a fee of ¥3.5 million. While he was initially deployed as a defender, he shifted into a more of a playmaker role and aided Shenzhen to the top tier title for the first time in the club's history. In January 2005, Zheng transferred to fellow Chinese Super League side Shandong Luneng Taishan for a transfer fee of ¥9.5 million.

=== Charlton Athletic ===
On 29 December 2006, Zheng was loaned out to Premier League side Charlton Athletic until the end of the season with an option to buy. He had been on trial with the club in November 2006. He made his debut for the club on 10 February 2007 in a 2–0 loss against Manchester United, coming on as a substitute for Amdy Faye. He scored his first goal on 18 March 2007 in a 2–0 win against Newcastle United.

Zheng returned to Shandong Luneng Taishan at the end of the 2006–07 season under the terms of his loan deal. He played once more for the club in a 6–1 loss against Beijing Guoan before he returned to Charlton on a permanent deal in August 2007. He joined for a fee of £2 million and signed a two-year contract with the club. He scored a total of seven league goals in the 2007–08 season; however, he was less effective in the second half of the season as a result of fatigue.

In the summer of 2008, Zheng was heavily linked with a transfer to West Bromwich Albion. Although Charlton were in negotiations with the club up to the end of the transfer window, the transfer failed to materialise. On 8 July 2009, Zheng left Charlton after failing to agree a new contract with the club following its relegation to League One.

=== Celtic ===
On 1 September 2009, Zheng transferred to Scottish Premier League side Celtic, signing a two-year contract and becoming the second Chinese footballer to sign for the club after Du Wei. Then manager Tony Mowbray affirmed his long held admiration for Zheng and expressed his delight at the signing. Zheng was unable to play for the club in the group stage of the 2009–10 UEFA Europa League after UEFA confirmed that he was not registered in time. He made his debut for the club on 4 October 2009 in a 2–1 loss against Rangers, winning a penalty. He scored his first goal for the club on 8 May 2010 in a 2–1 win against Heart of Midlothian. He was released by the club at the end of the 2009–10 season after failing to agree to a new contract.

=== Guangzhou FC ===
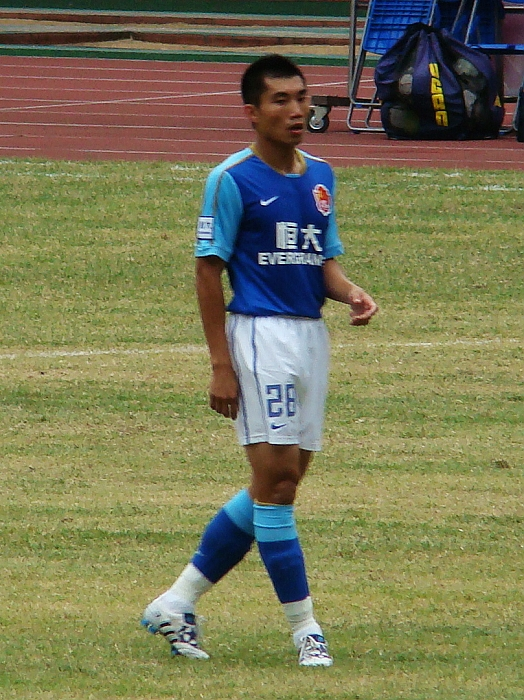
Zheng playing for Guangzhou Evergrande in 2010

On 28 June 2010, Zheng joined China League One side Guangzhou Evergrande on a free transfer. He made his debut for the club on 17 July 2010 in a 1–1 draw against Hubei Luyin. He scored first goal for the club 21 July 2010 in a 10–0 win against Nanjing Yoyo. In the 2010 season, Zheng scored five goals in 11 appearances as Guangzhou finished first place in the second division and won promotion back to the top tier.

After promotion to the Chinese Super League, Zheng took over as captain of the club as former captain Li Zhihai transferred to Guangdong Sunray Cave. Zheng scored five times in 25 appearances during the 2011 season as Guangzhou won the top tier title for the first time in the club's history, giving Zheng his third league title with three clubs. In the 2012 season, the club won the domestic double by winning the league title and the Chinese FA Cup; and in the 2013 season, won a third consecutive league title. In November 2013, Zheng captained Guangzhou to victory in the 2013 AFC Champions League Final as the club became the first Chinese club ever to win the AFC Champions League, and Zheng Zhi played the full game of the final, lifting the silverware as the captain. On 26 November 2013, Zheng was named the Asian Footballer of the Year by the Asian Football Confederation, becoming the second Chinese footballer to win the award after Fan Zhiyi in 2001.

On 27 October 2019, Zheng became the caretaker of the club when manager Fabio Cannavaro was temporarily relieved of his position and sent to corporate culture training until 3 November 2019.

On 5 December 2020, upon the club's elimination from the 2020 AFC Champions League group stage, Zheng was appointed general manager of the club.

== International career ==
Zheng joined the Chinese under-23 national team as the only player called up from the third tier. He made his debut for the Chinese national team on 7 December 2002 in a 3–1 win against Syria. He scored his first international goal on 29 January 2004 in a 1–0 win against Macedonia. After Zhu Guanghu took over as the manager in 2005, he was shifted into centre midfield and cemented his spot as the national team's first choice midfielder. Zheng captained the under-23 national team that competed at the 2008 Summer Olympics. Under Gao Hongbo's management, Zheng was appointed captain of the national team. In an interview on 3 August 2016, Zheng said, "This is the last time I will be in the final stage of FIFA World Cup qualification," indicating that after the 2018 FIFA World Cup, he would retire from the national team. On 2 June 2018, Zheng won his 100th cap for China in a 2–0 win against Thailand, making him the fourth Chinese footballer to win 100 caps.

On 16 June 2023, the Chinese FA held a retirement ceremony for Zheng prior to the national team's 4-0 win against Myanmar in Dalian. Zheng eventually played 108 games for China and scored 15 goals.

== Coaching Career ==
On 3 January 2026, Zheng was appointed as the head coach of Qingdao West Coast.

== Career statistics ==
=== Club ===
Appearances and goals by club, season and competition
Club	Season	League			National cup		League cup		Continental		Other		Total	
Club	Season	Division	Apps	Goals	Apps	Goals	Apps	Goals	Apps	Goals	Apps	Goals	Apps	Goals
Liaoning	1998	China League Two			–		–		–		–			
Liaoning	1999	China League Two	4	0	–		–		–		–		4	0
Liaoning	2000	China League Two	0	0	–		–		–		–		0	0
Liaoning	Total		4	0	0	0	0	0	0	0	0	0	4	0
Shenzhen Jianlibao	2001	Chinese Jia-A League	23	2	3	0	–		–		–		26	2
Shenzhen Jianlibao	2002	Chinese Jia-A League	27	6	2	0	–		–		–		29	6
Shenzhen Jianlibao	2003	Chinese Jia-A League	16	3	3	0	–		–		–		19	3
Shenzhen Jianlibao	2004	Chinese Super League	16	2	4	4	2	1	–		–		22	7
Shenzhen Jianlibao	Total		82	13	12	4	2	1	0	0	0	0	96	18
Shandong Luneng Taishan	2005	Chinese Super League	18	10	4	2	4	4	6	5	–		32	21
Shandong Luneng Taishan	2006	Chinese Super League	26	21	6	1	–		–		–		32	22
Shandong Luneng Taishan	2007	Chinese Super League	1	0	–		–		–		3 (Note: Appearances in A3 Champions Cup)	2	4	2
Shandong Luneng Taishan	Total		45	31	10	3	4	4	6	5	3	2	68	45
Charlton Athletic (loan)	2006–07	Premier League	12	1	0	0	0	0	–		–		12	1
Charlton Athletic	2007–08	Championship	42	7	2	1	1	1	–		–		45	9
Charlton Athletic	2008–09	Championship	13	1	0	0	0	0	–		–		13	1
Charlton Athletic	Total		67	9	2	1	1	1	0	0	0	0	70	11
Celtic	2009–10	Scottish Premier League	16	1	2	0	1	0	0	0	–		19	1
Guangzhou FC	2010	China League One	11	5	–		–		–		–		11	5
Guangzhou FC	2011	Chinese Super League	25	5	2	0	–		–		–		27	5
Guangzhou FC	2012	Chinese Super League	24	1	3	1	–		9	0	0 (Note: Appearances in Chinese FA Super Cup)	0	36	2
Guangzhou FC	2013	Chinese Super League	24	2	4	0	–		14	1	4 (Note: One appearance in Chinese FA Super Cup, three appearances in FIFA Club World Cup)	0	46	3
Guangzhou FC	2014	Chinese Super League	20	0	0	0	–		8	0	0	0	28	0
Guangzhou FC	2015	Chinese Super League	22	1	0	0	–		13	1	4	0	39	2
Guangzhou FC	2016	Chinese Super League	26	1	8	0	–		5	0	1	0	40	1
Guangzhou FC	2017	Chinese Super League	17	0	1	1	–		10	0	1	0	29	1
Guangzhou FC	2018	Chinese Super League	17	0	0	0	–		4	0	0	0	21	0
Guangzhou FC	2019	Chinese Super League	16	0	1	0	–		8	0	–		25	0
Guangzhou FC	2020	Chinese Super League	13	0	0	0	–		0	0	–		13	0
Guangzhou FC	2021	Chinese Super League	11	0	0	0	–		0	0	–		11	0
Guangzhou FC	Total		226	15	19	2	0	0	71	2	10	0	326	19
Career total			440	69	45	10	8	6	77	7	13	2	583	94

=== International ===
Appearances and goals by national team and year
National team	Year	Apps	Goals
China	2002	3	0
China	2003	4	0
China	2004	21	9
China	2005	3	1
China	2006	5	1
China	2007	3	0
China	2008	6	1
China	2009	4	0
China	2010	0	0
China	2011	10	1
China	2012	5	0
China	2013	11	0
China	2014	5	2
China	2015	12	0
China	2016	2	0
China	2017	4	0
China	2018	6	0
China	2019	4	0
Total		108	15

Scores and results list China's goal tally first, score column indicates score after each Zhang goal.

List of international goals scored by Zhang Linpeng
No.	Date	Venue	Opponent	Score	Result	Competition
1	29 January 2004	Suzhou Sports Center, Suzhou, China	North Macedonia	1–0	1–0	Friendly
2	7 February 2004	Shenzhen Stadium, Shenzhen, China	Finland	2–1	2–1	Friendly
3	17 March 2004	Huangpu Sports Center, Guangzhou, China	Myanmar	1–0	2–0	Friendly
4	1 June 2004	TEDA Football Stadium, Tianjin, China	Hungary	2–1	2–1	Friendly
5	10 July 2004	Hohhot People's Stadium, Hohhot, China	United Arab Emirates	1–2	2–2	Friendly
6	10 July 2004	Hohhot People's Stadium, Hohhot, China	United Arab Emirates	2–2	2–2	Friendly
7	17 July 2004	Workers Stadium, Beijing, China	Bahrain	1–1	2–2	2004 AFC Asian Cup
8	30 July 2004	Workers Stadium, Beijing, China	Iraq	2–0	3–0	2004 AFC Asian Cup
9	30 July 2004	Workers Stadium, Beijing, China	Iraq	3–0	3–0	2004 AFC Asian Cup
10	22 June 2005	Tianhe Stadium, Guangzhou, China	Costa Rica	1–0	2–0	Friendly
11	7 June 2006	Stade Geoffroy-Guichard, Saint-Étienne, France	France	1–1	1–3	Friendly
12	6 February 2008	Al-Rashid Stadium, Dubai, United Arab Emirates	Iraq	1–1	1–1	2010 FIFA World Cup qualifier
13	2 September 2011	Tuodong Stadium, Kunming, China	Singapore	1–1	2–1	2014 FIFA World Cup qualifier
14	14 October 2014	Helong Stadium, Changsha, China	Paraguay	1–0	2–1	Friendly
15	14 November 2014	Jiangxi Olympic Sports Center, Nanchang, China	New Zealand	1–0	1–1	Friendly

== Honours ==
Shenzhen Jianlibao

- Chinese Super League: 2004

Shandong Luneng Taishan

- Chinese Super League: 2006
- Chinese FA Cup: 2006

Guangzhou FC

- Chinese Super League: 2011, 2012, 2013, 2014, 2015, 2016, 2017, 2019
- China League One: 2010
- AFC Champions League: 2013, 2015
- Chinese FA Cup: 2012, 2016
- Chinese FA Super Cup: 2012, 2016, 2017, 2018

Individual

- AFC Asian Cup All-Star Team: 2004
- Asian Footballer of the Year: 2013
- AFC Champions League Dream Team: 2013, 2015
- Chinese Football Association Player of the Year: 2002, 2006
- Chinese Super League Team of the Year: 2002, 2003, 2004, 2005, 2006, 2012, 2013, 2014, 2015

== See also ==
- List of men's footballers with 100 or more international caps
