= Zhang Fengyu =

Chinese association football player

Personal information
- Date of birth: 10 May 1989 (age 37)
- Place of birth: Zibo, China
- Height: 1.83 m (6 ft 0 in)
- Position: Defender

Team information
- Current team: Qingdao Hainiu F.C.
- Number: 32

Youth career
- 2003–2009: Shandong Luneng

Senior career*
Years	Team	Apps	(Gls)
2008	→ Nanjing Baotai (loan)	6	(0)
2010–2014	Qingdao Jonoon	10	(0)
2012	→ Hebei Zhongji (loan)	25	(0)
2013	→ Shandong Tengding (loan)	18	(1)
2014	Shandong Tengding	6	(1)
2016–2020	Zibo Cuju	48	(12)
2021–	Qingdao Hainiu F.C.	44	(4)
- * Club domestic league appearances and goals as of 31 December 2022

Zhang Fengyu (simplified Chinese: 张丰羽; traditional Chinese: 張豐羽; pinyin: Zhāng Fēngyǔ; born 10 May 1989) is a Chinese footballer who currently plays as a defender for Qingdao Hainiu F.C.

== Club career ==
Zhang Fengyu started his football career with the Shandong Luneng youth team where he raised through their ranks and won the National U15 League Championship as well as the 2005 National U17 League Championship. In the 2008 league season he was loaned out to third tier club Nanjing Baotai to gain senior playing time. On his return he was not promoted to the senior team of Shandong Luneng and he left to join another top tier club in Qingdao Jonoon in the 2010 Chinese Super League season. On 25 September 2010 he made his debut for the club in a league game against Shaanxi Renhe in a match that ended in a 1-0 defeat. The following season would see him struggle to establish himself within the team and he was loaned out to Hebei Zhongji and Shandong Tengding

Zhang would make his move to Shandong Tengding permanently, however at the end of the 2014 China League Two league season the club was unable to gain promotion and disbanded. Despite being only 25 years old, Zhang retired from playing and returned to his hometown to raise his family. After several years out of the game he joined amateur football club Zibo Cuju and he was part of the team that quickly rose up the divisions, winning the 2017 China Amateur Football League and promotion into the professional leagues. After five seasons with the club, Zhang would return to his former club in Qingdao as they re-branded themselves as Qingdao Hainiu. He would go on to play a vital part as the club won the third tier title and promotion at the end of the 2021 China League Two season. He would go on to achieve successive promotions as he helped guide the club to second in the 2022 China League One season and promotion back into the top tier.

== Career statistics ==
As of 31 December 2022.

Club	Season	League			National Cup		Continental		Other		Total	
Club	Season	Division	Apps	Goals	Apps	Goals	Apps	Goals	Apps	Goals	Apps	Goals
Nanjing Baotai (loan)	2008	China League Two	6	0	0	0	-		-		6	0
Qingdao Jonoon	2010	Chinese Super League	7	0	0	0	-		-		7	0
Qingdao Jonoon	2011	Chinese Super League	1	0	1	0	-		-		2	0
Qingdao Jonoon	2014	China League One	2	0	0	0	-		-		2	0
Qingdao Jonoon	Total		10	0	1	0	0	0	0	0	11	0
Hebei Zhongji (loan)	2012	China League Two	25	0	0	0	-		-		25	0
Shandong Tengding (loan)	2013	China League Two	18	1	0	0	-		-		18	1
Shandong Tengding	2014	China League Two	6	1	0	0	-		-		6	1
Zibo Cuju	2016	Amateur League	0	0	0	0	-		-		0	0
Zibo Cuju	2017	Amateur League	0	0	0	0	-		-		0	0
Zibo Cuju	2018	China League Two	12	4	2	0	-		-		14	4
Zibo Cuju	2019	China League Two	29	6	2	0	-		-		31	6
Zibo Cuju	2020	China League Two	7	2	0	0	-		-		7	2
Zibo Cuju	Total		48	12	4	0	0	0	0	0	52	12
Qingdao Hainiu F.C.	2021	China League Two	26	3	0	0	-		-		26	3
Qingdao Hainiu F.C.	2022	China League One	18	1	0	0	-		-		18	1
Qingdao Hainiu F.C.	Total		44	4	0	0	0	0	0	0	44	4
Career total			157	18	5	0	0	0	0	0	162	18

== Honours ==
=== Club ===
Qingdao Hainiu

- China League Two: 2021
