= Peng Shaoxiong =

Chinese footballer (born 1989)

Peng Shaoxiong 彭绍雄
Personal information
- Full name: Peng Shaoxiong
- Date of birth: 27 May 1989 (age 37)
- Place of birth: Guangzhou, Guangdong, China
- Height: 1.73 m (5 ft 8 in)
- Position: Midfielder

Youth career
- 2005–2009: Guangzhou Evergrande

Senior career*
| Years | Team | Apps | (Gls) |
| 2007–2009 | → Guangdong Sunray Cave (loan) | | |
| 2010–2013 | Guangzhou Evergrande | 12 | (1) |
| 2013 | → Meizhou Kejia (loan) | 11 | (2) |
| 2014–2015 | Meizhou Wuhua | 8 | (0) |
| 2016 | Windsor Arch Ka I | 2 | (1) |
- * Club domestic league appearances and goals as of 10 October 2015

Peng Shaoxiong (simplified Chinese: 彭绍雄; traditional Chinese: 彭紹雄; pinyin: Péng Shàoxióng; born 27 May 1989) is a Chinese footballer who currently plays for China League Two side Meizhou Wuhua.

== Club career ==
Peng was loaned to Guangdong Sunray Cave for three seasons and returned to Guangzhou Evergrande in 2010. He made his debut for Guangzhou in a league game on 10 April 2010 in a 3-3 away draw to Pudong Zobon. He scored his first goal for Guangzhou in a league match against Shanghai East Asia on 7 May 2010 and scored the first goal of the match in a 3-1 victory.

== Honours ==
=== Club ===
Guangzhou Evergrande

- China League One: 2010
- Chinese Super League: 2011, 2012
- Chinese FA Super Cup: 2012
- Chinese FA Cup: 2012

Meizhou Kejia

- China League Two: 2015
