= 2015 Chinese Super League =

Chinese Super League
- Season: 2015
- Dates: 4 March – 31 October 2015
- Champions: Guangzhou Evergrande Taobao; 5th title
- Relegated: Shanghai Shenxin; Guizhou Renhe
- AFC Champions League: Guangzhou Evergrande Taobao; Shanghai SIPG; Shandong Luneng Taishan
- Matches: 240
- Goals: 672 (2.8 per match)
- Top goalscorer: (Brazil) Aloísio (22 goals)
- Biggest home win: Guangzhou Evergrande Taobao 7–0 Chongqing Lifan (Jul. 5th, 2015) (7 goals)
- Biggest away win: Shanghai Shenxin 0–4 Beijing Guoan (Sept. 27th, 2015) (4 goals)
- Highest scoring: Shanghai Greenland Shenhua 6–2 Shanghai Shenxin (Mar. 8th, 2015) (8 goals) Shanghai SIPG 5–3 Changchun Yatai (Jun. 19th, 2015) (8 goals)
- Longest winning run: Shanghai SIPG (6 matches)
- Longest unbeaten run: Guangzhou Evergrande Taobao (26 matches)
- Longest winless run: Tianjin TEDA (13 matches)
- Longest losing run: Shanghai Shenxin (6 matches)
- Highest attendance: 53,526; Beijing Guoan 0–2 Guangzhou Evergrande Taobao (Oct 31st, 2015)
- Lowest attendance: 4,807; Guangzhou R&F 0–0 Liaoning Whowin (May 1st, 2015)
- Average attendance: 22,193 (31 October)

The 2015 Ping An Chinese Football Association Super League (Chinese: 2015中国平安中国足球协会超级联赛) was the 12th season since the establishment of the Chinese Super League, the 22nd season of a professional Association football league and the 54th top-tier league season in China. The league title sponsor was Ping An Insurance. Guangzhou Evergrande Taobao won their fifth consecutive title of the league.

== Team changes ==
Teams promoted from 2014 China League One

- Chongqing Lifan
- Shijiazhuang Ever Bright

Teams relegated to 2015 China League One

- Dalian Aerbin
- Harbin Yiteng

Chongqing Lifan returned to the division after a 4-year absence; Shijiazhuang Ever Bright competed in the Chinese Super League for the first time in the club's history. Dalian Aerbin were relegated after three years in the Chinese top-flight, while Harbin Yiteng were relegated to China League One after spending a season in the Chinese Super League.

=== Name changes ===
- Shanghai Dongya changed their name to Shanghai SIPG in December 2014.
- Guangzhou Evergrande changed their name to Guangzhou Evergrande Taobao in December 2014.
- Jiangsu Sainty changed their name to Jiangsu Guoxin-Sainty in January 2015.

== Clubs ==
=== Clubs and locations ===
Club	Head coach	Captain	City	Stadium	Capacity	2014 season
Guangzhou Evergrande Taobao ^{TH}	(Brazil) Luiz Felipe Scolari	(China) Zheng Zhi	Guangzhou	Tianhe Stadium	58,500	1st
Beijing Guoan	(Spain) Gregorio Manzano	(China) Xu Yunlong	Beijing	Workers' Stadium	66,161	2nd
Guangzhou R&F	(Serbia) Dragan Stojković	(China) Zhang Yaokun	Guangzhou	Yuexiushan Stadium	18,000	3rd
Shandong Luneng Taishan	(Brazil) Cuca	(China) Wang Dalei	Jinan	Jinan Olympic Sports Center Stadium	56,808	4th
Shanghai SIPG	(Sweden) Sven-Göran Eriksson	(China) Sun Xiang	Shanghai	Shanghai Stadium	56,842	5th
Guizhou Renhe	(China) Gong Lei	(China) Zhang Lie	Guiyang	Guiyang Olympic Sports Center	51,636	6th
Tianjin TEDA	(Netherlands) Arie Haan	(China) Zhou Haibin	Tianjin	Tianjin Olympic Centre	54,696	7th
Jiangsu Guoxin-Sainty	(Romania) Dan Petrescu	(China) Lu Bofei	Nanjing	Nanjing Olympic Sports Centre	61,443	8th
Shanghai Greenland Shenhua	(France) Francis Gillot	(Colombia) Giovanni Moreno	Shanghai	Hongkou Football Stadium	33,060	9th
Liaoning Whowin	(China) Ma Lin	(China) Zhao Junzhe	Shenyang (playing in Panjin)	Panjin Jinxiu Stadium	35,600	10th
Shanghai Shenxin	(China) Liu Junwei	(China) Yu Tao	Shanghai	Yuanshen Sports Centre Stadium	16,000	11th
Hangzhou Greentown	(China) Yang Ji	(China) Wang Lin	Hangzhou	Huanglong Sports Center	52,672	12th
Changchun Yatai	(Croatia) Marijo Tot	(China) Yan Feng	Changchun	Development Area Stadium	25,000	13th
Henan Jianye	(China) Jia Xiuquan	(Brazil) Ivo	Zhengzhou	Hanghai Stadium	29,860	14th
Chongqing Lifan ^{P}	(China) Wang Baoshan	(China) Wang Dong	Chongqing	Chongqing Olympic Sports Center	58,680	CL1, 1st
Shijiazhuang Ever Bright ^{P}	(Bulgaria) Yasen Petrov	(China) Li Chao	Shijiazhuang	Yutong International Sports Center	29,000	CL1, 2nd

Location of teams in 2015 Chinese Super League

=== Managerial changes ===
Team	Outgoing manager	Date of vacancy	Incoming manager	Date of appointment
Guangzhou Evergrande Taobao	(Italy) Marcello Lippi	2 November 2014	(Italy) Fabio Cannavaro	5 November 2014
Guangzhou R&F	(Sweden) Sven-Göran Eriksson	10 November 2014	(Romania) Cosmin Contra	18 December 2014
Changchun Yatai	(Serbia) Dragan Okuka	12 November 2014	(China) Gao Jinggang	19 December 2014
Shanghai SIPG	(China) Xi Zhikang	18 November 2014	(Sweden) Sven-Göran Eriksson	18 November 2014
Hangzhou Greentown	(China) Yang Ji	2 December 2014	(France) Philippe Troussier	2 December 2014
Shanghai Greenland Shenhua	(Argentina) Sergio Batista	4 December 2014	(France) Francis Gillot	4 December 2014
Shanghai Shenxin	(China) Guo Guangqi	13 April 2015	(China) Liu Junwei	13 April 2015
Guizhou Renhe	(China) Zhu Jiong	28 April 2015	(China) Li Chunman (caretaker)	28 April 2015
Guangzhou Evergrande Taobao	(Italy) Fabio Cannavaro	4 June 2015	(Brazil) Luiz Felipe Scolari	4 June 2015
Changchun Yatai	(China) Gao Jinggang	12 June 2015	(Croatia) Marijo Tot	12 June 2015
Jiangsu Guoxin-Sainty	(China) Gao Hongbo	29 June 2015	(Netherlands) Arie Schans (caretaker)	29 June 2015
Hangzhou Greentown	(France) Philippe Troussier	1 July 2015	(China) Yang Ji	1 July 2015
Guizhou Renhe	(China) Li Chunman (caretaker)	8 July 2015	(China) Gong Lei	8 July 2015
Jiangsu Guoxin-Sainty	(Netherlands) Arie Schans (caretaker)	9 July 2015	(Romania) Dan Petrescu	9 July 2015
Guangzhou R&F	(Romania) Cosmin Contra	22 July 2015	(China) Li Bing (caretaker)	22 July 2015
Liaoning Whowin	(China) Chen Yang	2 August 2015	(China) Ma Lin	2 August 2015
Guangzhou R&F	(China) Li Bing (caretaker)	24 August 2015	(Serbia) Dragan Stojković	24 August 2015

=== Foreign players ===
The number of foreign players is restricted to five per CSL team, including a slot for a player from AFC countries. A team can use four foreign players on the field in each game, including at least one player from the AFC country. Players from Hong Kong, Macau and Chinese Taipei are deemed to be native players in CSL. However, those players will be treated as foreign Asia players if they participate in any AFC competitions.

- Players name in **bold** indicates the players that were registered during the mid-season transfer window.
- Players name in italics indicates the players that were out of squads or left their respective clubs during the mid-season transfer window.

Club	Player 1	Player 2	Player 3	Player 4	AFC player	Former players
Beijing Guoan	(Argentina) Pablo Batalla	(Brazil) **Kléber**	(Croatia) Darko Matić	(Montenegro) Dejan Damjanović	(South Korea) Ha Dae-sung	(Sweden) Erton Fejzullahu
Changchun Yatai	(Bolivia) Marcelo Moreno	(Hungary) Ákos Elek	(Hungary) Szabolcs Huszti	(Niger) Moussa Maâzou	(Uzbekistan) Anzur Ismailov	
Chongqing Lifan	(Argentina) Emanuel Gigliotti	(Brazil) **Fernandinho**	(Brazil) **Jael**	(Morocco) Issam El Adoua	(Australia) Adrian Leijer	(Brazil) Guto (Brazil) Jajá
Guangzhou Evergrande Taobao	(Brazil) Elkeson	(Brazil) **Paulinho**	(Brazil) Ricardo Goulart	(Brazil) **Robinho**	(South Korea) Kim Young-gwon	(Brazil) Alan (Brazil) Renê Júnior
Guangzhou R&F	(Brazil) **Renatinho**	(Democratic Republic of the Congo) **Jeremy Bokila**	(Nigeria) Aaron Samuel	(Spain) Míchel	(South Korea) Jang Hyun-soo	(Morocco) Abderrazak Hamdallah (South Korea) Park Jong-woo
Guizhou Renhe	(Bosnia and Herzegovina) **Sejad Salihović**	(Bosnia and Herzegovina) **Zvjezdan Misimović**	(Brazil) Hyuri	(Brazil) Ricardo Santos	(South Korea) Park Ju-sung	(Poland) Krzysztof Mączyński (Sweden) Magnus Eriksson
Hangzhou Greentown	(Australia) **Matthew Spiranovic**	(Brazil) Anselmo Ramon	(Ivory Coast) Davy Claude Angan	(Serbia) **Miloš Bosančić**	(Lebanon) Roda Antar	(Tunisia) Bassem Boulaabi (Tunisia) Imed Louati
Henan Jianye	(Brazil) Ivo	(Denmark) Eddi Gomes	(Philippines) Javier Patiño	(Poland) Mateusz Zachara	(South Korea) Jung In-whan	
Jiangsu Guoxin-Sainty	(Croatia) Sammir	(Iceland) Sölvi Ottesen	(Iceland) Viðar Örn Kjartansson	(Romania) **Marius Constantin**	(Japan) Sergio Escudero	(Brazil) Eleílson
Liaoning Whowin	(Brazil) **Paulo Henrique**	(Ivory Coast) Franck Boli	(Nigeria) Derick Ogbu	(Romania) **Eric Bicfalvi**	(South Korea) Kim Yoo-jin	(Australia) Josh Mitchell (Zambia) James Chamanga
Shandong Luneng Taishan	(Argentina) Walter Montillo	(Brazil) Aloísio	(Brazil) Diego Tardelli	(Brazil) Junior Urso	(Brazil) Jucilei ^{1}	
Shanghai Greenland Shenhua	(Colombia) Giovanni Moreno	(Greece) Avraam Papadopoulos ^{2}	(Mali) **Mohamed Sissoko**	(Senegal) **Demba Ba**	(Australia) Tim Cahill	(Brazil) Paulo Henrique (Zambia) Stoppila Sunzu
Shanghai Shenxin	(Brazil) Everton	(Brazil) Johnny	(Costa Rica) **Michael Barrantes**	(Nigeria) Daniel Chima Chukwu		(Brazil) Zé Eduardo (South Korea) Lim You-hwan
Shanghai SIPG	(Argentina) Darío Conca	(Brazil) Davi	(Ghana) **Asamoah Gyan**	(Sweden) Tobias Hysén	(South Korea) Kim Ju-young	(Ivory Coast) Jean Evrard Kouassi
Shijiazhuang Ever Bright	(Iceland) **Eiður Guðjohnsen**	(Portugal) **Rúben Micael**	(Venezuela) Mario Rondón	(Zambia) Jacob Mulenga	(South Korea) Cho Yong-hyung	(Brazil) Rodrigo Defendi (Bulgaria) Georgi Iliev
Tianjin TEDA	(Argentina) Hernán Barcos	(Brazil) Lucas Fonseca	(Brazil) **Wágner**	(Romania) **Cristian Tănase**	(Iran) Morteza Pouraliganji	(Brazil) Andrezinho (Colombia) Wilmar Jordán

- **^1** Jucilei owns Palestine citizenship and was counted as an Asian player in the Chinese Super League
- **^2** Avraam Papadopoulos owns Australian citizenship and could play as an Asian player in the Chinese Super League

Hong Kong/Macau/Taiwan outfield players (doesn't count on the foreign or Asian player slot in CSL)

Club	Player 1
Changchun Yatai	(Chinese Taipei) Ko Yu-ting
Guizhou Renhe	(Chinese Taipei) Xavier Chen
Hangzhou Greentown	(Chinese Taipei) Chen Po-liang
Shijiazhuang Ever Bright	(Hong Kong) Bai He

== League table ==
Pos	Team	Pld	W	D	L	GF	GA	GD	Pts	Qualification or relegation
1	Guangzhou Evergrande Taobao (C)	30	19	10	1	71	28	+43	67	Qualification to Champions League group stage
2	Shanghai SIPG	30	19	8	3	63	35	+28	65	Qualification to Champions League play-off round
3	Shandong Luneng Taishan	30	18	5	7	66	41	+25	59	Qualification to Champions League preliminary round 2
4	Beijing Guoan	30	16	8	6	46	26	+20	56	
5	Henan Jianye	30	12	10	8	35	30	+5	46	
6	Shanghai Greenland Shenhua	30	12	6	12	42	44	−2	42	
7	Shijiazhuang Ever Bright	30	8	15	7	34	31	+3	39	
8	Chongqing Lifan	30	9	8	13	37	52	−15	35 (Note: Head-to-head points: Chongqing Lifan 6 pts, Jiangsu Guoxin-Sainty 5 pts, Changchun Yatai 5 pts; Head-to-head results between Jiangsu and Changchun — Jiangsu: 2 pts, 0 goal difference and 2 away goals, Changchun: 2 pts 0 goal difference and 1 away goal.)	
9	Jiangsu Guoxin-Sainty (Note: Jiangsu Guoxin-Sainty qualified for the 2016 AFC Champions League group stage as winners of the 2015 Chinese FA Cup.)	30	9	8	13	39	48	−9	35	Qualification to Champions League group stage
10	Changchun Yatai	30	8	11	11	39	47	−8	35	
11	Hangzhou Greentown	30	8	9	13	27	35	−8	33	
12	Liaoning Whowin	30	7	10	13	30	46	−16	31 (Note: Head-to-head points: Liaoning Whowin 8 pts, Tianjin TEDA 4 pts, Guangzhou R&F 4 pts; Head-to-head results between Tianjin and Guangzhou R&F — Tianjin: 3 pts, +1 goal difference, Guangzhou R&F: 3 pts −1 goal difference.)	
13	Tianjin TEDA	30	7	10	13	39	46	−7	31	
14	Guangzhou R&F	30	8	7	15	35	41	−6	31	
15	Guizhou Renhe (R)	30	7	8	15	39	52	−13	29	Relegation to League One
16	Shanghai Shenxin (R)	30	4	5	21	30	70	−40	17	Relegation to League One

Source: sports.sina.com (in Chinese)
Rules for classification: 1) points; 2) head-to-head points; 3) head-to-head goals scored; 4) head-to-head away goals scored; 5)goal difference; 6) number of goals scored; 7) disciplinary points (1 point for each yellow card, 3 points for each red card). Head-to-Head: Only used at the end of the season when two or more teams need the head-to-head rules to break a tie.
(C) Champions; (R) Relegated

=== Results ===
Home \ Away	GZE	SD	BJ	GZM	SJZ	GZF	SHS	SGS	SSI	LN	TJ	HZ	JSS	CC	HN	CQ
Guangzhou Evergrande Taobao		2–2	0–0	3–0	2–1	2–2	6–1	2–2	1–1	6–1	2–2	1–0	3–3	1–1	1–1	7–0
Shandong Luneng Taishan	1–2		3–0	5–2	3–1	1–2	2–2	2–0	0–1	2–0	2–3	2–1	5–1	2–0	2–1	3–0
Beijing Guoan	0–2	3–1		2–2	3–1	2–0	2–1	2–0	0–0	2–0	3–0	4–0	1–0	3–1	1–0	2–0
Guizhou Renhe	2–3	2–2	2–1		0–0	2–2	2–1	1–2	2–0	0–1	0–1	1–2	0–1	2–2	2–0	0–1
Shijiazhuang Ever Bright	1–1	1–1	2–2	1–2		1–0	2–1	2–0	2–2	1–1	4–3	0–0	2–1	0–0	0–1	2–0
Guangzhou R&F	1–2	2–4	0–0	4–0	0–0		1–3	0–1	2–3	0–0	1–0	2–0	2–1	2–2	1–2	2–0
Shanghai Shenxin	2–4	1–2	0–4	2–5	0–0	2–1		1–1	0–2	2–1	0–1	2–0	0–1	1–4	1–2	0–1
Shanghai Greenland Shenhua	0–3	1–2	3–1	1–1	0–0	1–0	6–2		1–2	3–1	1–0	2–0	3–1	3–0	1–0	2–2
Shanghai SIPG	0–3	3–4	1–1	3–1	2–2	2–1	2–0	5–0		2–1	2–1	2–1	2–1	5–3	3–0	2–1
Liaoning Whowin	1–3	3–2	1–0	2–1	1–1	0–0	1–1	1–0	1–3		3–2	0–2	2–3	2–2	0–1	1–1
Tianjin TEDA	0–2	1–3	4–0	3–4	1–1	2–0	4–1	1–1	0–0	0–0		0–0	1–0	1–1	2–3	0–3
Hangzhou Greentown	0–1	0–1	1–1	1–0	1–1	1–2	4–2	4–1	1–1	0–0	2–1		2–1	0–1	0–0	1–3
Jiangsu Guoxin-Sainty	0–1	2–3	0–0	2–0	2–1	2–2	1–0	3–2	1–4	2–1	1–1	1–1		1–1	1–1	1–2
Changchun Yatai	0–2	1–2	1–2	2–1	0–3	1–2	1–1	3–1	0–2	2–1	2–2	1–0	2–2		2–0	2–1
Henan Jianye	2–1	1–0	0–1	1–1	0–1	1–0	5–0	2–1	2–2	1–1	3–1	0–0	1–0	0–0		3–3
Chongqing Lifan	1–2	2–2	0–3	1–1	1–0	2–1	2–0	0–2	2–4	1–1	1–1	1–2	2–3	2–1	1–1	

Updated to match(es) played on 31 October 2015. Source: Results on the official website of the Chinese Super League (in Chinese)
Legend: Blue = home team win; Yellow = draw; Red = away team win.

=== Positions by round ===
Team ╲ Round	1	2	3	4	5	6	7	8	9	10	11	12	13	14	15	16	17	18	19	20	21	22	23	24	25	26	27	28	29	30
Guangzhou Evergrande Taobao	5	4	4	7	3	2	2	2	2	2	3	2	2	1	1	3	3	3	3	2	2	1	2	2	1	1	1	1	1	1
Shanghai SIPG	5	3	2	2	2	1	1	1	1	1	2	4	4	4	3	2	2	2	1	1	1	2	1	1	2	2	2	2	2	2
Shandong Luneng Taishan	4	6	6	3	5	8	5	6	4	4	1	1	1	3	4	4	4	4	4	3	3	3	3	3	3	3	4	4	3	3
Beijing Guoan	2	2	3	1	1	3	6	3	3	3	4	3	3	2	2	1	1	1	2	4	4	4	4	4	4	4	3	3	4	4
Henan Jianye	3	7	7	6	7	4	7	8	9	10	11	12	10	5	5	5	5	5	5	6	8	7	8	7	6	5	5	5	5	5
Shanghai Greenland Shenhua	1	1	1	4	4	6	3	7	7	7	9	9	11	9	11	11	7	7	6	5	5	6	6	6	5	6	7	7	7	6
Shijiazhuang Ever Bright	9	12	12	14	12	13	10	11	10	8	7	8	8	8	8	8	8	8	7	7	6	5	5	5	7	7	6	6	6	7
Chongqing Lifan	15	15	15	15	15	15	14	14	14	13	13	14	14	12	9	10	13	13	10	10	10	10	11	9	10	10	10	8	10	8
Jiangsu Guoxin-Sainty	9	7	10	9	9	7	8	5	6	6	6	5	6	7	6	6	6	6	8	8	7	8	7	8	8	8	9	9	8	9
Changchun Yatai	14	13	13	12	13	11	12	12	13	14	14	11	9	13	7	9	9	9	9	9	9	9	9	10	9	9	8	10	9	10
Hangzhou Greentown	9	10	11	10	10	12	13	13	11	12	12	13	13	11	13	14	11	11	13	12	13	11	12	11	11	11	12	11	13	11
Liaoning Whowin	8	4	4	5	8	10	9	9	8	9	10	10	12	14	14	13	14	14	14	14	15	15	13	14	12	12	13	12	11	12
Tianjin TEDA	13	11	14	13	11	9	11	10	12	11	8	6	5	6	10	12	12	12	12	13	14	14	14	15	15	13	14	14	14	13
Guangzhou R&F	5	9	8	8	6	5	4	4	5	5	5	7	7	10	12	7	10	10	11	11	11	12	15	12	13	14	11	13	12	14
Guizhou Renhe	12	14	9	11	14	14	15	15	15	15	15	15	15	15	15	15	15	15	15	15	12	13	10	13	14	15	15	15	15	15
Shanghai Shenxin	16	16	16	16	16	16	16	16	16	16	16	16	16	16	16	16	16	16	16	16	16	16	16	16	16	16	16	16	16	16

Leader and qualification to AFC Champions League group stage
Qualification to AFC Champions League play-off round
Qualification to AFC Champions League preliminary round 2
Relegation to League One

Source: Table by round (in Chinese)

== Goalscorers ==
=== Top scorers ===
Rank	Player	Club	Total
1	(Brazil) Aloísio	Shandong Luneng Taishan	22
2	(Brazil) Ricardo Goulart	Guangzhou Evergrande Taobao	19
3	(Montenegro) Dejan Damjanović	Beijing Guoan	16
4	(Argentina) Emanuel Gigliotti	Chongqing Lifan	15
4	(Argentina) Hernán Barcos	Tianjin TEDA	15
6	(China) Wu Lei	Shanghai SIPG	14
7	(China) Gao Lin	Guangzhou Evergrande Taobao	13
7	(Zambia) Jacob Mulenga	Shijiazhuang Ever Bright	13
9	(Brazil) Anselmo Ramon	Hangzhou Greentown	12
9	(Sweden) Tobias Hysén	Shanghai SIPG	12

Last updated: 31 October 2015
Source: csl.sina.com.cn

=== Hat-tricks ===
Player	For	Against	Result	Date
(Brazil) Paulo Henrique	Shanghai Greenland Shenhua	Shanghai Shenxin	6–2	8 March 2015
(Brazil) Ricardo Goulart	Guangzhou Evergrande Taobao	Shanghai Shenxin	6–1	10 May 2015
(Montenegro) Dejan Damjanović	Beijing Guoan	Changchun Yatai	3–1	16 September 2015
(Senegal) Demba Ba	Shanghai Greenland Shenhua	Jiangsu Guoxin-Sainty	3–1	31 October 2015

== League attendance ==
Pos	Team	Total	High	Low	Average	Change
1	Guangzhou Evergrande Taobao	688,339	51,025	38,154	45,889	+8.9%
2	Beijing Guoan	614,952	53,526	33,636	40,997	+4.1%
3	Chongqing Lifan	563,918	48,530	28,660	37,595	+183.7%^{†}
4	Jiangsu Guoxin-Sainty	402,867	49,748	11,540	26,858	+10.3%
5	Shanghai SIPG	395,721	46,977	18,008	26,381	+111.7%
6	Shijiazhuang Ever Bright	376,053	27,113	20,911	25,070	+109.8%^{†}
7	Shandong Luneng Taishan	338,385	41,155	10,156	22,559	−5.7%
8	Henan Jianye	303,099	21,677	17,715	20,207	+9.9%
9	Tianjin TEDA	294,908	41,899	8,226	19,661	+14.4%
10	Shanghai Greenland Shenhua	292,597	25,751	12,353	19,506	+26.5%
11	Guizhou Renhe	227,078	25,381	7,283	15,139	+22.8%
12	Changchun Yatai	222,818	28,615	9,621	14,855	+15.3%
13	Liaoning Whowin	191,827	21,037	5,827	12,788	+0.1%
14	Hangzhou Greentown	188,487	26,681	8,579	12,566	−8.7%
15	Guangzhou R&F	119,839	13,685	4,807	7,989	−30.5%
16	Shanghai Shenxin	105,416	11,183	5,587	7,028	−30.5%
	League total	5,326,304	53,526	4,807	22,193	+16.9%

Updated to games played on October 31, 2015
Source: CSL official data (in Chinese)
Notes:
^{†} Teams played previous season in CL1.

== Awards ==
The awards of 2015 Chinese Super League were announced on 10 November 2015.

- Chinese Football Association Footballer of the Year: (Brazil) Ricardo Goulart (Guangzhou Evergrande Taobao)
- Chinese Super League Golden Boot Winner: (Brazil) Aloísio (Shandong Luneng Taishan)
- Chinese Super League Domestic Golden Boot Award: (China) Wu Lei (Shanghai SIPG)
- Chinese Football Association Goalkeeper of the Year: (China) Zeng Cheng (Guangzhou Evergrande Taobao)
- Chinese Football Association Manager of the Year: (Brazil) Luiz Felipe Scolari (Guangzhou Evergrande Taobao)
- Chinese Football Association Referee of the Year: (China) Tan Hai
- Chinese Super League Fair Play Award: Shijiazhuang Ever Bright, Hangzhou Greentown, Chongqing Lifan
- Chinese Super League Team of the Year (442):
  - GK (China) Zeng Cheng (Guangzhou Evergrande Taobao)
  - DF (China) Zhang Linpeng (Guangzhou Evergrande Taobao), (South Korea) Kim Young-gwon (Guangzhou Evergrande Taobao), (China) Feng Xiaoting (Guangzhou Evergrande Taobao), (China) Xu Yunlong (Beijing Guoan)
  - MF (China) Zheng Zhi (Guangzhou Evergrande Taobao), (China) Huang Bowen (Guangzhou Evergrande Taobao), (China) Wu Xi (Jiangsu Guoxin-Sainty), (Argentina) Darío Conca (Shanghai SIPG)
  - FW (Brazil) Ricardo Goulart (Guangzhou Evergrande Taobao), (China) Wu Lei (Shanghai SIPG)
