= Guangzhou F.C. (disambiguation) =

Guangzhou F.C. was a former name of Guangzhou Evergrande Taobao F.C.

For other football clubs based in Guangzhou, it may also refer to

- Guangdong Sunray Cave F.C.
- Guangzhou R&F F.C.
