= 2008 China League Two =

China League Two
- Season: 2008
- Champions: Shenyang Dongjin
- Promoted: Shenyang Dongjin; Guangdong Sunray Cave

The 2008 China League Two started in April 2008 and ended in December 2008. Guangdong Sunray Cave and Shenyang Dongjin finished top-2 and promoted to China League One 2009.

== Final league tables ==
=== Southern Group ===
Pos	Team	Pld	W	D	L	GF	GA	GD	Pts	Qualification
1	Guangdong Sunray Cave (Q, P)	14	9	4	1	34	16	+18	31	Qualification for Play-offs semi-final
2	Tianjin Songjiang (Q)	14	9	2	3	28	11	+17	29	Qualification for Play-offs first round
3	Hunan Billows (Q)	14	9	1	4	22	12	+10	28	Qualification for Play-offs first round
4	Guizhou Zhicheng (Q)	14	7	4	3	22	17	+5	25	Qualification for Play-offs first round
5	Suzhou Trips	14	5	5	4	17	15	+2	20	
6	Wenzhou Tomorrow	14	2	3	9	7	17	−10	9	
7	Ningbo Huaao	14	1	4	9	10	25	−15	7	
8	Zhanjiang Tiandi No.1	14	2	1	11	4	31	−27	7	

Updated to match(es) played on unknown. Source:
(P) Promoted; (Q) Qualified for the phase indicated

=== Northern Group ===
Pos	Team	Pld	W	D	L	GF	GA	GD	Pts	Qualification
1	Shenyang Dongjin (Q, C, P)	14	9	5	0	23	7	+16	32	Qualification for Play-offs semi-final
2	Shijiazhuang Tiangong (Q)	14	7	5	2	22	16	+6	26	Qualification for Play-offs first round
3	Hangzhou Sanchao (Q)	14	7	4	3	20	13	+7	25	Qualification for Play-offs first round
4	Tianjin Huochetou (Q)	14	7	2	5	22	12	+10	23	Qualification for Play-offs first round
5	Shaanxi Star	14	5	4	5	21	17	+4	19	
6	Xinjiang Sport Lottery	14	4	5	5	12	19	−7	17	
7	Tianjin Dongli	14	2	2	10	7	21	−14	8	
8	Nanjing Baotai	14	1	1	12	6	28	−22	4	

Updated to match(es) played on unknown. Source:
(C) Champions; (P) Promoted; (Q) Qualified for the phase indicated

Rules for classification: 1st points; 2nd head-to-head points; 3rd head-to-head goal difference; 4th head-to-head goals scored; 5th goal difference; 6th goals scored.

== Play-offs ==
- The 2007–08 China University Football League winners China Three Gorges University qualified for the play-off first round. Runners-up Hohai University (Nanjing Baotai) and 3rd place Beijing Institute of Technology (Beijing BIT) were already playing in League Two and League One, so 4th place Shenzhen University qualified with Three Gorges University.

=== First round ===
Team 1	Agg.	Team 2	1st leg	2nd leg
Shijiazhuang Tiangong	1–2	Hunan Billows	0–2	1–0
China Three Gorges University	6–1	Shenzhen University	3–0	3–1
Tianjin Huochetou	5–2	Guizhou Zhicheng	4–0	1–2
Hangzhou Sanchao	1–6	Tianjin Songjiang	0–2	1–4

=== Second round ===
Team 1	Agg.	Team 2	1st leg	2nd leg
Hunan Billows	1–5	Tianjin Huochetou	0–1	1–4
China Three Gorges University	2–2 (5–4 p)	Tianjin Songjiang	0–2	2–0 (a.e.t.)

=== Promotion finals ===
All times local (GMT+8)

==== First leg ====
19 December 2008
09:30

Shenyang Dongjin	0–1	China Three Gorges University
		Hu Xi 23'

Longquan Football Stadium, Chengdu

19 December 2008
15:00

Tianjin Huochetou	0–1	Guangdong Sunray Cave
		Yin Hongbo 77'

Longquan Football Stadium, Chengdu

==== Second leg ====
21 December 2008
09:30

Guangdong Sunray Cave	3–1	Tianjin Huochetou
Ye Weichao 4'; Yu Jianfeng 38' (pen.); Cong Tianhao 54'	(Report)	Feng Renliang 43'

Longquan Football Stadium, Chengdu
Referee: Tan Hai

Guangdong Sunray Cave won 4–1 on aggregate and promoted to China League One 2009.

21 December 2008
15:00

China Three Gorges University	0–1 (a.e.t.)	Shenyang Dongjin
		Deng Li 65'
Penalties
	3–4

Longquan Football Stadium, Chengdu

Shenyang Dongjin 1–1 China Three Gorges University on aggregate. Shenyang Dongjin won 4–3 on penalties and promoted to China League One 2009.

=== Third place final ===
23 December 2008
09:00

China Three Gorges University	2–1	Tianjin Huochetou
Qi Zhongxi 29'; Xiao Ze 70'		Shan Tong 78'

Longquan Football Stadium, Chengdu

=== Champions final ===
23 December 2008
11:00

Shenyang Dongjin	1–0	Guangdong Sunray Cave
Du Ping 78'

Longquan Football Stadium, Chengdu

== Top Scorer ==
Rank	Player	Club	Goals
1	(China) Ye Weichao	Guangdong Sunray Cave	11
