= Lim Jong-wook =

South Korean footballer

Lim Jong-Wook
Personal information
- Full name: Lim Jong-Wook
- Date of birth: 26 August 1986 (age 40)
- Place of birth: South Korea
- Height: 1.75 m (5 ft 9 in)
- Position: Midfielder

Team information
- Current team: Chungju Hummel
- Number: 10

Youth career
- Kyung Hee University

Senior career*
Years	Team	Apps	(Gls)
2009	Daejeon KHNP	21	(4)
2010	Beijing IT	21	(5)
2011–2012	Changwon City	50	(15)
2013	Chungju Hummel	30	(4)
2014–2020	Changwon City	47	(9)
- * Club domestic league appearances and goals as of 19 December 2013

Lim Jong-Wook (Korean: 임종욱; born 26 August 1986) is a South Korean footballer who played as midfielder for Chungju Hummel FC in K League Challenge.

== Career ==
He was selected by Chungju Hummel FC in 2013 K League Draft. He made his debut against Korean Police FC on 17 March 2013.
