= 2008 China League One =

China League One
- Champions: Jiangsu Sainty
- Promoted: Jiangsu Sainty; Chongqing Lifan
- Relegated: Yantai Yiteng
- Goals: 416
- Average goals/game: 2.73
- Top goalscorer: Sabin Ilie (18 goals)

The 2008 China League One title was the fifth season of the China League One, the second tier of the Chinese football league pyramid, since its establishment in 2004. The league was won by Jiangsu Sainty.

== Teams ==
A total of 13 teams contested in the league, including 10 sides from the 2007 season and three promoted from the 2007 China League Two.

=== Team changes ===
Teams promoted from 2007 China League Two

- Shanghai East Asia
- Sichuan
- Anhui Jiufang

Teams promoted to 2009 Chinese Super League

- Jiangsu Sainty
- Chongqing Lifan

Team relegated to 2009 China League Two

- Yantai Yiteng

=== Personnel ===
Team	Manager
Anhui Jiufang	
Beijing BIT	(China) Cao Xiandong
Beijing Hongdeng	
Chongqing Lifan	(China) Wei Xin
Jiangsu Sainty	(China) Pei Encai
Nanchang Bayi Hengyuan	(China) Li Xiao
Nanjing Yoyo	
Qingdao Hailifeng	
Shanghai East Asia	(China) Jiang Bingyao
Shanghai Stars	(China) Ma Liangxing
Sichuan	(China) Sun Bowei
Yanbian	(China) Zhao Yongyuan
Yantai Yiteng	(China) Wang Jun

=== Foreign players ===
The number of foreign players is restricted to three, but all teams can only use two foreign players on the field in each game. Players from Hong Kong, Macau and Chinese Taipei are deemed to be native players in CL1.

- Players name in **bold** indicates the player is registered during the mid-season transfer window.
- Players in italics were out of the squad or left the club within the season, after the pre-season transfer window, or in the mid-season transfer window, and at least had one appearance.

Club	Player 1	Player 2	Player 3	Former players
Anhui Jiufang	(Croatia) Igor Hodonj			
Beijing BIT				
Beijing Hongdeng	(Canada) Omari Aldridge	(Nigeria) **Benedict Akwuegbu**		(Bosnia and Herzegovina) Tomislav Brnadić
Chongqing Lifan	(Cameroon) Ernest Emako-Siankam	(Cameroon) François Dikoumé	(Ghana) Daniel Quaye	
Jiangsu Sainty	(Brazil) Magno	(Brazil) Márcio	(Croatia) Igor Budiša	
Nanchang Bayi Hengyuan	(Brazil) Alex Maranhão	(Brazil) Bill	(Brazil) Manoel	
Nanjing Yoyo	(Brazil) Cílio Souza			
Qingdao Hailifeng	(Hungary) Sándor Nagy	(Romania) Sabin Ilie		
Shanghai East Asia				
Shanghai Stars	(Angola) Quinzinho	(Cameroon) Didier Njewel		
Sichuan	(Brazil) Renan Marques	(Nigeria) **Jeremiah Ani**		
Yanbian	(Brazil) Maurinho	(Democratic Republic of the Congo) Zola Kiniambi	(Guinea-Bissau) **Emiliano Té**	
Yantai Yiteng	(Canada) Gordon Chin	(Serbia) Miodrag Anđelković	(South Korea) Wang Jung-hyun	(South Korea) Park Jung-hwan

== Final league table ==
Pos	Team	Pld	W	D	L	GF	GA	GD	Pts	Promotion or relegation
1	Jiangsu Sainty (C, P)	24	19	2	3	56	24	+32	59	Promotion to Chinese Super League
2	Chongqing Lifan (P)	24	12	7	5	34	19	+15	43	Promotion to Chinese Super League
3	Nanchang Bayi Hengyuan	24	11	9	4	37	24	+13	42	
4	Anhui Jiufang	24	7	9	8	33	37	−4	30	
5	Sichuan	24	7	8	9	27	36	−9	29	
6	Shanghai East Asia	24	7	7	10	26	30	−4	28 (Note: Shanghai 10 pts; Beijing A. 9 pts; Qingdao 8 pts; Yanbian 6 pts)	
7	Beijing BIT	24	7	7	10	27	39	−12	28	
8	Qingdao Hailifeng	24	7	7	10	33	38	−5	28	
9	Yanbian	24	8	4	12	32	39	−7	28	
10	Nanjing Yoyo	24	6	9	9	35	38	−3	27 (Note: Wuxi 1−0 Nanjing; Nanjing 1−0 Wuxi)	
11	Wuxi Zobon	24	7	6	11	24	33	−9	27	
12	Beijing Hongdeng	24	5	11	8	24	24	0	26	
13	Yantai Yiteng (R)	24	5	10	9	28	35	−7	25	Relegation to China League Two

Updated to match(es) played on 15 November 2008. Source: League Table
Rules for classification: 1) points; 2) head-to-head points; 3) head-to-head goal difference; 4) head-to-head goals scored; 5) goal difference; 6) number of goals scored.
(C) Champions; (P) Promoted; (R) Relegated

== Top scorers ==
Rank	Player	Club	Goals
1	(Romania) Sabin Ilie	Qingdao Hailifeng	18
2	(Brazil) Magno	Jiangsu Sainty	15
3	(Brazil) Márcio	Jiangsu Sainty	13
4	(Brazil) Cílio Souza	Nanjing Yoyo	12
5	(Brazil) Renan Marques	Sichuan	11
6	(Brazil) Alex Maranhão	Nanchang Bayi Hengyuan	10
6	(China) Li Weiliang	Nanjing Yoyo	10
6	(China) Tan Si	Jiangsu Sainty	10
6	(China) Wang Kai	Chongqing Lifan	10
10	(China) Lu Bin	Beijing BIT	9
