= Gabriel Melkam =

Nigerian footballer

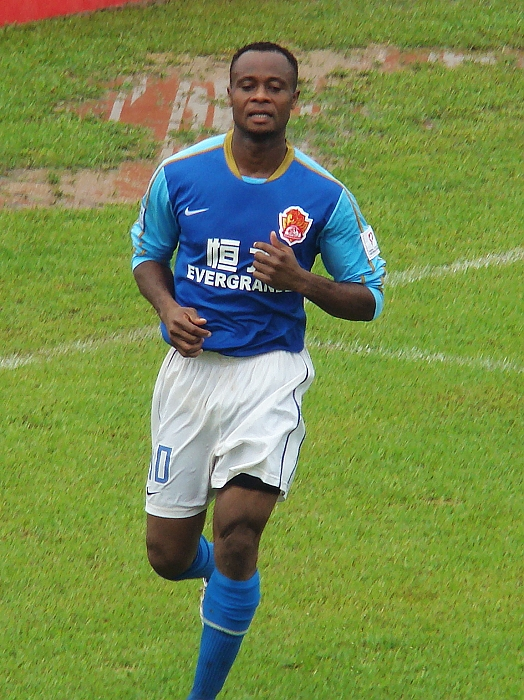
- Melkam playing for Xiamen Lanshi in 2007

Personal information
- Full name: Gabriel Chukwuwunzo Melkam
- Date of birth: 13 March 1980 (age 46)
- Place of birth: Lagos, Nigeria
- Height: 1.82 m (6 ft 0 in)
- Positions: Left back; midfielder

Youth career
- –1996: Stationery Stores

Senior career*
Years	Team	Apps	(Gls)
1996–1998	Kwara United		
1998–2001	SG Wattenscheid 09	85	(12)
2001–2003	Karlsruher SC	56	(4)
2003–2005	Hansa Rostock	19	(1)
2005–2006	Sportfreunde Siegen	27	(1)
2006–2007	Xiamen Lanshi	38	(0)
2008–2009	Changchun Yatai	44	(4)
2010	Guangzhou Evergrande	18	(1)
2011–2013	Qingdao Jonoon	80	(1)
Total		367	(24)

International career
1999	Nigeria U-20		
- * Club domestic league appearances and goals

Gabriel Chukwuwunzo Melkam (born 13 March 1980) is a Nigerian former professional footballer who played as a left back or midfielder.

== Club career ==
In April 2007, Melkam was banned three matches and fined 5000 RMB for misconduct for showing "All Referee of Chinese Super League were cheat." on his T-shirt after the match against Henan Jianye, to revenge the serious mistake of referee on the match Xiamen Lanshi against Shanghai Shenhua.

Melkam transferred to Guangzhou Evergrande in 2010. He made his China League One debut for Guangzhou against Beijing BIT on 3 April.

== International career ==
Melkam finished runner-up at the 1999 African Youth Championship and quarter-finalist at 1999 FIFA World Youth Championship. Melkam was included in the Nigerian squad for the 2006 FIFA World Cup qualifier in Zimbabwe on 5 September. The tie marked the debut of the then-Hansa Rostock defender Melkam, who narrowly missed out on a place in Nigeria's 2004 Cup of Nations squad.

== Personal life ==
Melkam's younger brother Innocent Melkam played football in the German lower leagues.

== Honours ==
Guangzhou Evergrande

- China League One: 2010
