= Dragan Kokotović =

Serbian footballer and manager

Personal information
- Full name: Dragan Kokotović
- Date of birth: March 1, 1953 (age 73)
- Place of birth: Belgrade, SFR Yugoslavia
- Position: Midfielder

Senior career*
Years	Team	Apps	(Gls)
1964–1981	Rad		
1981–1984	PAS Giannina		

Managerial career
- 1993–1994: PAS Giannina
- 1994–1995: Kalamata
- 1995–1996: PAOK
- 1995–1996: Kalamata
- 1997–1998: Panargiakos
- 1998–1999: Apollon Athens
- 1998–2000: Nafpaktiakos Asteras
- 2000–2001: Olympiacos Volos
- 2004–2005: Apollon Kalamarias
- 2007–2009: Atromitos
- 2010–2011: Panserraikos
- 2011–2012: Guangdong Sunray Cave
- 2014: Olympiacos Volos
- 2017: Shanghai JuJu Sports
- * Club domestic league appearances and goals

Dragan Kokotović (Serbian Cyrillic: Драган Кокотовић) is a former Serbian football player who has become a football manager.

Kokotović played most of his career in the Yugoslav First League with FK Rad, but finished after playing three seasons in the Greek first division with PAS Giannina.
