= Márcio (footballer, born February 1981) =

Brazilian footballer

Personal information
- Full name: Márcio de Oliveira Barros
- Date of birth: February 7, 1981
- Place of birth: Rio de Janeiro, Brazil
- Date of death: 21 April 2012 (aged 31)
- Place of death: São Paulo, Brazil
- Height: 1.86 m (6 ft 1 in)
- Position: Striker

Senior career*
| Years | Team | Apps | (Gls) |
| 2004–2005 | Taubaté | | |
| 2006 | Botafogo | | |
| 2007 | América (SP) | | |
| 2007 | Juventus | | |
| 2007 | América (MG) | | |
| 2008 | Jiangsu Sainty | 20 | (13) |
| 2008–2009 | Santa Cruz | | |
| 2009 | Náutico | | |
| 2010 | At.Sorocaba | | |
| 2010 | Anhui Jiufang | 19 | (5) |
| 2011 | Santa Cruz | | |
| 2011– | Atlético Sorocaba | | |
- * Club domestic league appearances and goals as of 25 February 2010

Márcio de Oliveira Barros (February 7, 1981, in Rio de Janeiro – April 21, 2012, in São Paulo) was a Brazilian footballer who played for Atlético Sorocaba and Taubaté.

== Career ==
Marcinho began playing professional football with Botafogo Futebol Clube. Marcinho joined Jiangsu Sainty in 2008. He helped the club promote to the top flight, but he was released at the end of the season and returned to Brazil.

On 24 February 2010, Anhui Jiufang, who would play in China League One, confirmed that Márcio had signed a contract with the club.

Marcio died on April 21, 2012, in São Paulo.

== Honours ==
Jiangsu Sainty

- China League One: 2008
