= Tiandi No.1 Beverage =

Chinese beverage company

- Type: public
- Traded as: NEEQ: 832898
- Industry: beverage
- Founded: 2002
- Founder: Chen Sheng
- Headquarters: China
- Area served: mainland China, Hong Kong
- Key people: Chen Sheng (Chairman & CEO); Zhang Luan (Vice-Chairman); Yan Bin Executive President); Wang Guang (Director)
- Products: apple vinegar
- Brands: Tiandi No.1
- Revenue: ▲CN¥1.574 billion (2015)
- Operating income: ▲CN¥514.816 million (2015)
- Net income: ▲CN¥441.590 million (2015)
- Total assets: ▲CN¥2.538 billion (2015)
- Total equity: ▲CN¥1.365 billion (2015)
- Owner: Chen Sheng (80.18%); Wang Guang (4.99%); Zhang Luan (4.98%); others (9.85%)
- Footnotes in a consolidated basis, in Chinese accounting standards

Tiandi No.1 Beverage Inc.
- Simplified Chinese: 天地壹号饮料股份有限公司
- Traditional Chinese: 天地壹號飲料股份有限公司
Transcriptions

Tiandi No.1 Beverage Inc. is a Chinese non-alcoholic beverage company. The company produces apple vinegar.

== Corporate history ==
The founder of the company, Chen Sheng (Chinese: 陈生), invented his old vinegar (Chinese: 陈醋) recipe in 1997 and starts selling to the customers. In 2002, the company was incorporated. In 2007, the company starts selling Tiandi No.1 apple vinegar (Chinese: 天地壹号苹果醋饮料).

The shares of the company is traded in the Chinese over-the-counter National Equities Exchange and Quotations since 2015. Although Chen Sheng and his brother Wang Guang (Chinese: 王广), owned a combined 85.17% shares of the company as at 31 December 2015. Moreover, the top 10 shareholders owned a combined 97.08% shares, including directors Zhang Luan (Chinese: 张銮, ranked 3rd for 4.98%) and Yan Bin (Chinese: 闫斌, ranked 6th for 1.00%).

In April 2019, the company announced to form a joint venture with fellow beverage company Huiyuan Juice. However, in July the deal was terminated.

== Notable equity investment ==
Tiandi No.1 Beverage owned 18.06% shares of Haisheng Juice (SEHK: 359) as of 2015. Since 2016, Haisheng Juice is a supplier of Tiandi No.1 Beverage.

== Controversy ==
In 2013, Guangdong "Time Weekly" (Chinese: 时代周报) reported that the company stored their ingredients improperly, as well as addictive was added to produce their vinegar, concerning the actual quality of their drinks.

In 2019, The Beijing News criticised the accuracy of the financial reports of the company.

== Sister company ==
Sister company Guangdong Tiandi Food Group, was the parent company of a football club based in Zhanjiang. The sister company named the club "Zhanjiang Tiandi No.1 F.C.". Chen also owned Guangdong No.1 Food Co., Ltd., which sold "No.1 Native Pig" (Chinese: 壹号土猪) and "No.1 Native Chicken" (Chinese: 壹号土鸡). Chen was ranked joint-357th in 2012 Forbes China Rich List.
