= Eduardo Delani =

Brazilian footballer (born 1981)

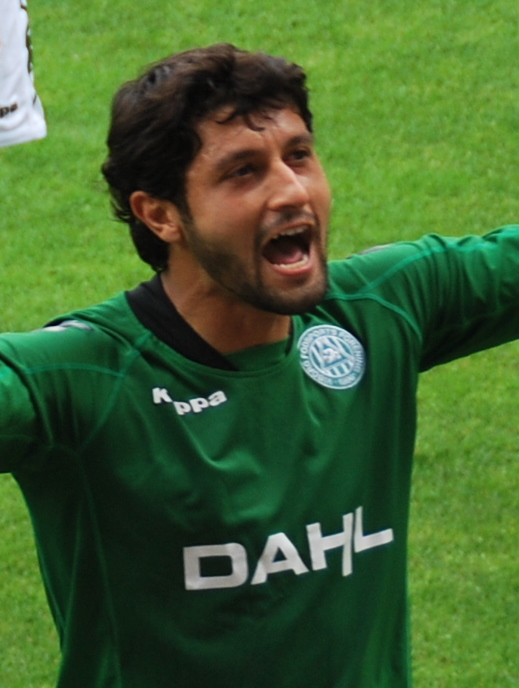
- Delani playing for Viborg in 2011

Personal information
- Full name: Eduardo Delani Santos Leite
- Date of birth: 3 November 1981 (age 45)
- Place of birth: Brasília, Brazil
- Height: 1.88 m (6 ft 2 in)
- Positions: Midfielder; forward

Senior career*
Years	Team	Apps	(Gls)
1998	Bragantino		
1999–2002	Cruzeiro		
2003	Marília		
2004	Botafogo		
2005–2006	Halmstads BK	18	(1)
2007	CRB		
2007–2009	Vejle Boldklub	71	(14)
2010–2011	Guangzhou Evergrande	3	(0)
2011–2012	Viborg FF	9	(3)
- * Club domestic league appearances and goals

Eduardo Delani Santos Leite (born 3 November 1981) is a retired Brazilian professional footballer.

== Career ==
Delani was brought to Europe in early 2005 by Swedish Allsvenskan club Halmstads BK. Due to a severe knee injury the transfer was delayed until the summer, becoming the first Brazilian to play for the club ever. After the 2006 season Halmstads BK chose not to extend Delani's contract. He returned home to Brazil and he played for the club Clube de Regatas Brasil for a short time before returning to Scandinavia, this time signing for the Danish club Vejle Boldklub. On 26 July 2007 he signed a one-year contract with the club.

Eduardo Delani is the double first cousin of former professional football player Kaká, and Kaká's brother Digão, who last played for New York Red Bulls. Their fathers are brothers, and their mothers are sisters.

== Honours ==
Guangzhou Evergrande

- China League One: 2010
