= Ye Weichao =

Chinese footballer

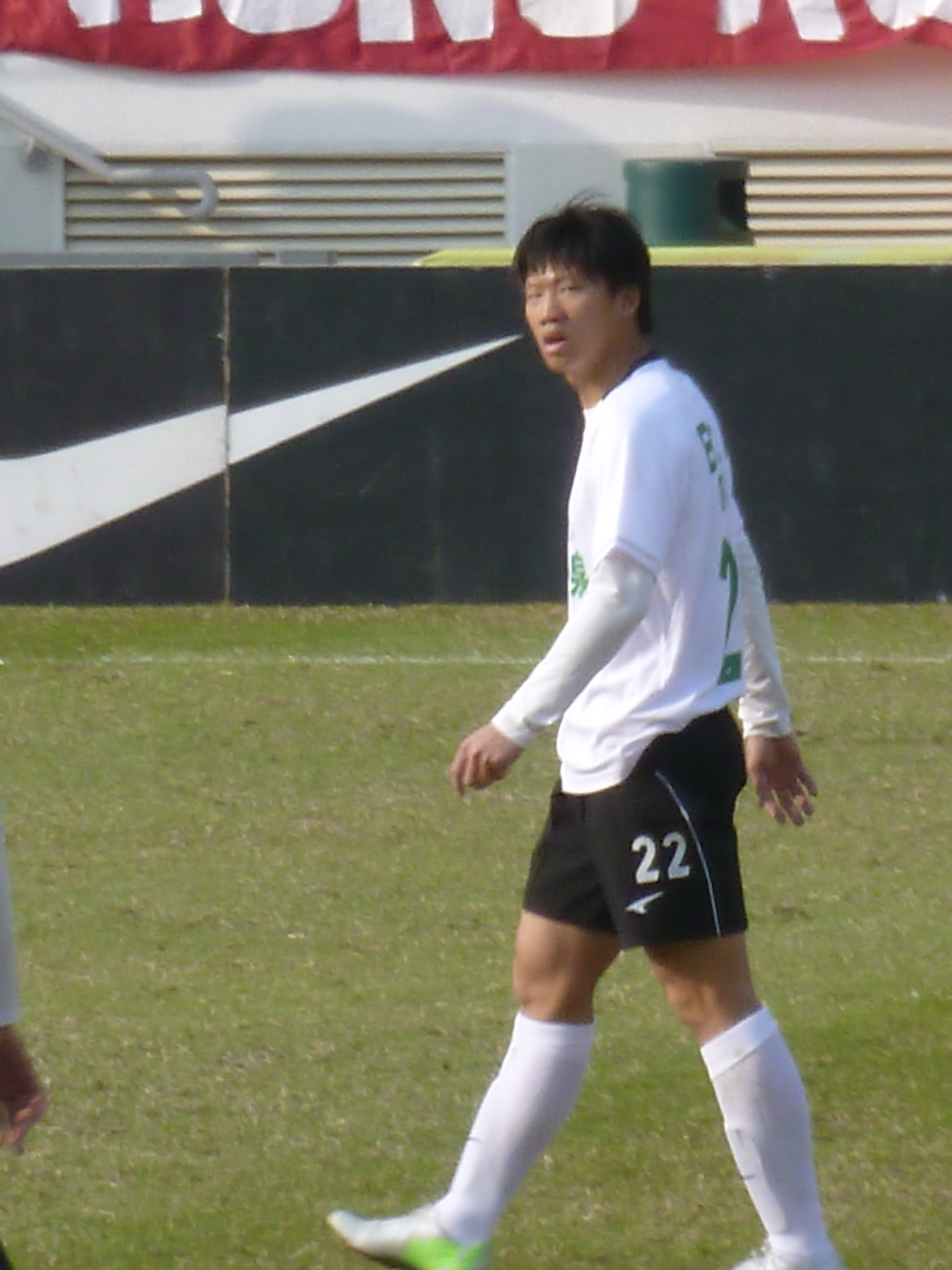

Personal information
- Full name: Ye Weichao
- Date of birth: 18 February 1989 (age 37)
- Place of birth: Guangzhou, Guangdong, China
- Height: 1.77 m (5 ft 9 1/2 in)
- Position: Striker

Youth career
- 2005–2010: Guangzhou Pharmaceutical
- 2005–2006: → Bristol City (loan)

Senior career*
Years	Team	Apps	(Gls)
2007–2010	→ Guangdong Sunray Cave (loan)	60	(30)
2011–2014	Guangzhou Evergrande	6	(1)
2013	→ Meizhou Kejia (loan)	7	(5)
2014	→ Guangdong Sunray Cave (loan)	15	(4)
2016	Zhejiang Yiteng	2	(0)
2017–2020	Meixian Techand	39	(10)

International career^{‡}
2011	China	1	(0)
- * Club domestic league appearances and goals as of 22 December 2023 ‡ National team caps and goals as of 26 March 2011

Ye Weichao (Chinese: 叶伟超; pinyin: Yè Wěichāo; born 18 February 1989) is a Chinese footballer.

== Club career ==
Ye started his football career in 2007 when he was loaned to Guangdong Sunray Cave from Guangzhou Pharmaceutical. He scored his first senior goal in a match against Ningbo Huaao on 23 June 2007. Ye steadily established himself within the team in the 2008 league season. He scored eleven goals for the club which ensured Guangdong Sunray Cave promote to China League One that season. Ye was called back to Guangzhou's first team in December 2009 but did not stay for long. He was loaned back out to Guangdong Sunray Cave again in March 2010. He scored fourteen goals in twenty appearances in the 2010 season.

Ye returned to Guangzhou Evergrande before the 2011 season. He made his debut for Guangzhou on 15 May 2011 in a 3–1 win against Henan Construction, coming on as a substitute for Renato Cajá in the 67th minute and also scoring his first goal for the club. However, he was loaned out to China League Two side Meizhou Kejia in July 2013 after not establishing himself within the club. In February 2014, Ye moved back to Guangdong Sunray Cave on a one-year loan deal. Ye made trials with Hong Kong Premier League side Kitchee and Jiangxi Liansheng after he left Guangzhou Evergrande at the end of 2014 but couldn't stay.

On 26 February 2016, Ye was signed for China League One club Zhejiang Yiteng. He made his debut for Zhejiang on 9 July 2016 in a 4–0 away defeat against Tianjin Quanjian, coming on for Li Gen in the 63rd minute.

On 21 January 2017, Ye moved to League Two side Meixian Techand. On 11 November 2018 he scored the winning goal for Meixian in the extra time of 2018 China League One Relegation play-offs against Shaanxi Chang'an Athletic, which ensured Meixian Techand's stay in the second tier.

== International career ==
Ye made his senior international debut for China in a 2–2 friendly against Costa Rica on 26 March 2011 in a 2–2 draw and assisted Gao Lin's game-tying goal in the injury time.

== Career statistics ==
Statistics accurate as of match played 3 November 2018.

Club performance			League		Cup		League Cup		Continental		Other		Total	
Season	Club	League	Apps	Goals	Apps	Goals	Apps	Goals	Apps	Goals	Apps	Goals	Apps	Goals
China PR			League		FA Cup		CSL Cup		Asia		Other		Total	
2007	Guangdong Sunray Cave	China League Two	12	2	-		-		-		-		12	2
2008	Guangdong Sunray Cave	China League Two	17	11	-		-		-		-		17	11
2009	Guangdong Sunray Cave	China League One	11	3	-		-		-		-		11	3
2010	Guangdong Sunray Cave	China League One	20	14	-		-		-		-		20	14
2011	Guangzhou Evergrande	Chinese Super League	4	1	0	0	-		-		-		4	1
2012	Guangzhou Evergrande	Chinese Super League	2	0	0	0	-		0	0	0	0	2	0
2013	Guangzhou Evergrande	Chinese Super League	0	0	0	0	-		0	0	0	0	0	0
2013	Meizhou Kejia	China League Two	7	5	0	0	-		-		-		7	5
2014	Guangdong Sunray Cave	China League One	15	4	1	0	-		-		-		16	4
2016	Zhejiang Yiteng	China League One	2	0	0	0	-		-		-		2	0
2017	Meixian Techand	China League Two	24	9	1	0	-		-		-		25	9
2018	Meixian Techand	China League One	15	1	1	0	-		-		1 (Note: Appearances in China League One play-offs)	1	17	2
Total	China PR		129	50	3	0	0	0	0	0	1	1	133	51

== Honours ==
=== Club ===
Guangzhou Evergrande

- Chinese Super League: 2011, 2012
- Chinese FA Super Cup: 2012
- Chinese FA Cup: 2012

=== Individual ===
- China League Two Top goalscorer: 2008
