= 2010 China League One =

China League One
- Season: 2010
- Champions: Guangzhou Evergrande
- Promoted: Guangzhou Evergrande; Chengdu Blades
- Relegated: Nanjing Yoyo
- Matches: 156
- Goals: 381 (2.44 per match)
- Top goalscorer: Gao Lin (20 goals)
- Biggest home win: Guangzhou 10–0 Nanjing (21 July)
- Biggest away win: Nanjing 0–5 Guangzhou (23 October)
- Highest scoring: Guangzhou 10–0 Nanjing (21 July)

The 2010 China League One was the seventh season of the league since the establishment.

== Teams ==
After 2009 season, Liaoning Whowin and Nanchang Bayi Hengyuan were promoted to 2010 Chinese Super League and Sichuan were relegated to 2010 China League Two. They were replaced by Hunan Billows and Hubei Luyin which were promoted from 2009 China League Two, Chengdu Blades and Guangzhou Evergrande who were relegated from 2009 Chinese Super League. Beijing Baxy&Shengshi took over Beijing Hongdeng and take their position within the division.

Chengdu Blades and Guangzhou Evergrande, who finished in 7th and 9th place in Super League 2009, were relegated from the top flight for match-fixing scandals, while Qingdao Hailifeng, who finished in 10th place in 2009 China League One, were banned from all future national matches organized by the CFA for the same reason.

On 21 July 2010, Guangzhou Evergrande trounced Nanjing Yoyo 10-0 at Century Lotus Stadium, setting a new record in Chinese professional football league for biggest ever league win in the process.

On 25 September 2010, Guangzhou Evergrande and Chengdu Blades were promoted to the Chinese Super League for the 2011 season after Hubei Luyin draw 1-1 with Shanghai Zobon. On 23 October, Nanjing Yoyo were relegated to China League Two for the 2011 season after a 5-0 home defeat to Guangzhou Evergrande.

== Foreign players ==
Club	Player 1	Player 2	Player 3	Player 4	Former Players
Anhui Jiufang	(Brazil) Márcio	(Bulgaria) Yordan Varbanov	(The Gambia) Matthew Mendy		
Beijing Baxy&Shengshi	(Montenegro) Vlado Jeknić	(Puerto Rico) John Krause			
Beijing BIT	(Netherlands) Raphael Maitimo	(South Korea) Lim Jong-wook			
Chengdu Blades	(Angola) Johnson Macaba	(Australia) Brendon Santalab	(Brazil) Harison	(Brazil) Tiago	(Brazil) Tiago Prado
Guangdong Sunray Cave	(Brazil) Giovane	(Brazil) Joel	(Cameroon) Mahama Awal		(Cameroon) Guy Madjo
Guangzhou Evergrande	(Brazil) Eduardo Delani	(Brazil) Muriqui	(Canada) Charles Gbeke	(Nigeria) Gabriel Melkam	(Australia) John Tambouras
Hubei Luyin					
Hunan Billows	(Honduras) Mitchel Brown				
Nanjing Yoyo					
Shanghai East Asia					
Shanghai Zobon					
Shenyang Dongjin	(Brazil) Anderson				
Yanbian	(Rwanda) Jean-Paul Eale Lutula				

== League table ==
Pos	Team	Pld	W	D	L	GF	GA	GD	Pts	Promotion or relegation
1	Guangzhou Evergrande (C, P)	24	17	6	1	61	21	+40	57	Promotion to Chinese Super League
2	Chengdu Blades (P)	24	17	5	2	56	15	+41	56	Promotion to Chinese Super League
3	Yanbian	24	12	4	8	30	21	+9	40	
4	Shanghai East Asia	24	9	10	5	25	18	+7	37 (Note: Shanghai, 4 pts; Hubei, 1 pt)	
5	Hubei Luyin	24	10	7	7	30	24	+6	37	
6	Hunan Billows	24	10	5	9	21	24	−3	35	
7	Shenyang Dongjin	24	6	12	6	23	23	0	30	
8	Beijing Baxy&Shengshi	24	10	4	10	24	24	0	28 (Note: Beijing Baxy&Shengshi were given a 6-point deduction for late payment of wages.)	
9	Anhui Jiufang	24	7	3	14	17	36	−19	24	
10	Shanghai Zobon	24	5	8	11	22	37	−15	23	
11	Guangdong Sunray Cave	24	5	7	12	34	39	−5	22	
12	Beijing BIT	24	4	6	14	22	40	−18	18	
13	Nanjing Yoyo (R)	24	3	5	16	19	62	−43	14	Disbanded after season

Updated to match(es) played on 30 October 2010. Source: League One table
Rules for classification: 1st points; 2nd head-to-head points; 3rd head-to-head goal difference; 4th head-to-head goals scored; 5th goal difference; 6th goals scored; 7th disciplinary points (1 point for each yellow card, 3 points for each red card.)
(C) Champions; (P) Promoted; (R) Relegated

== Results ==
Home \ Away	AH	BJB	BJT	CD	GD	GZ	HB	HN	NJ	SHZ	SHE	SY	YB
Anhui Jiufang		1–3	1–0	0–4	0–3	0–4	1–0	1–2	4–0	2–1	0–1	1–1	2–1
Beijing Baxy&Shengshi	3–0		0–1	1–3	1–0	1–2	1–2	0–1	2–1	2–1	0–0	0–2	2–1
Beijing BIT	1–2	0–0		0–4	2–2	0–3	0–2	2–0	2–2	1–0	1–2	0–0	1–3
Chengdu Blades	4–0	3–1	2–1		3–0	0–0	5–2	3–0	3–0	4–0	0–3	1–1	3–2
Guangdong Sunray Cave	0–1	0–1	2–1	0–3		2–3	5–1	1–1	4–2	5–1	1–2	3–3	1–1
Guangzhou Evergrande	1–0	3–1	3–1	2–2	2–1		2–1	3–1	10–0	3–1	1–1	2–3	2–1
Hubei Luyin	1–0	0–0	1–0	1–1	3–0	1–1		3–1	1–0	1–1	0–0	0–1	1–0
Hunan Billows	1–0	1–0	2–0	0–1	1–1	0–1	0–0		0–0	2–0	2–1	1–0	1–0
Nanjing Yoyo	1–0	1–3	0–2	0–4	2–2	0–5	2–6	2–1		1–2	2–2	0–1	1–0
Shanghai Zobon	1–1	0–1	3–1	1–0	1–0	3–3	1–1	1–1	1–0		0–0	1–1	1–2
Shanghai East Asia	1–0	0–0	1–1	0–1	2–0	1–3	1–0	2–1	0–0	4–1		0–0	0–0
Shenyang Dongjin	0–0	0–1	2–2	0–0	1–1	0–2	0–2	0–1	3–1	0–0	3–1		1–1
Yanbian	2–0	1–0	3–2	0–2	1–0	0–0	1–0	2–0	4–1	1–0	1–0	2–0	

Source: League One results
Legend: Blue = home team win; Yellow = draw; Red = away team win.

== Top scorers ==
Updated to games played on 30 October 2010.

Rank	Player	Club	Goals
1	(China) Gao Lin	Guangzhou Evergrande	20
2	(China) Ye Weichao	Guangdong Sunray Cave	14
3	(Brazil) Muriqui	Guangzhou Evergrande	13
3	(Rwanda) Jean-Paul Eale Lutula	Yanbian	13
5	(Angola) Johnson Macaba	Chengdu Blades	12
5	(Brazil) Giovane	Guangdong Sunray Cave	12
7	(Canada) Charles Gbeke	Guangzhou Evergrande	9
7	(China) Wu Lei	Shanghai East Asia	9
9	(Brazil) Anderson	Shenyang Dongjin	7
9	(Brazil) Tiago	Chengdu Blades	7
9	(China) Lu Bin	Beijing BIT	7
9	(Honduras) Mitchel Brown	Hunan Billows	7
