= Guirenniao =

Chinese apparel and food company

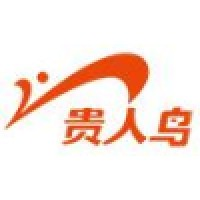
- Type: Private
- Industry: Sportswear, Food
- Founded: 1987; 39 years ago
- Founder: Tianfu Lin
- Headquarters: China
- Brands: Guirenniao, Prince
- Revenue: ▲CNY 2.19bn (2023); CNY 1.42bn (2022)
- Net income: ▼ -CNY485 million (2023); -CNY9.4 million (2022)
- Owner: Taifujingu Network Technology (20.4%)
- Website: https://www.grn.cn/

Guirenniao Co., Ltd. is a Chinese apparel and food company. The company was listed on the Shanghai Stock Exchange. It was one of leading chinese sports brand.

At its peak, the company had more than 5,000 outlets. In 2015, its market cap topped CNY42.7 billion (US$5.5 billion). The company had celebrity brand ambassadors such as Andy Lau, Lin Chi-Ling, and Cecilia Cheung. The company is known as "Shoe King of China".

== History ==
Guirenniao was established in 1987 by Lin Tianfu. The company was an OEM for other sportswear companies in the 1980s. "Guirenniao" brand was launched in 2002 while the company was officially formed in 2004.

From 2009 to 2011, the brand was an instant hit due to the Andy Lau's endorsement and the number of physical stores increased from 1,847 to 5,057.

The firm went public on Shanghai Stock Exchange in 2014. In 2015, Guirenniao became second largest shareholder (16.1%) of Hupu after it invested RMB239 million (US$38.5 million) in the firm and announced that they plan to establish a RMB2 billion (US$320 million) investment fund with sports portal Hupu. The fund was named "Arena Capital". Guirenniao also invested 200 million yuan in KPS Sports or Compass Sports and acquired Spanish soccer agency Best of You Sports SA (45%).

In 2016, Sequential Brands partnered with Guirenniao to expand And1 in China. In the same year, the company acquired trademark rights of Prince Global Sports in Greater China for $20 million. Multiple companies were acquired during this time - offline retailer Jiezhixing, online distributor Ming Shoe Library, Shengdao Sports (45.45%), Xingyou Technology Game Company, retailer S.cn and invested 260 million in Ankang Life Insurance. In 2017, Guirenniao ended its restructuring plan. It also failed to acquire fitness chain Weikang Fitness. Guirenniao also issued an announcement to change its name to "Almighty Sports".

In 2018, JD.com announced that they had signed a cooperation agreement with Guirenniao. They sold their shares in Hupu, sold Jiezhixing for 300 million yuan and sold 37% stake in Kangpaisi Sports for 143 million yuan. Between 2018 and 2020 was unprofitable and in 2019. the company logged a net loss of US$136.9 million. In the first quarter of 2019, more than 2,000 stores closed down, with about 2,800 remaining. In August 2019, due to a loan contract dispute, the 325 million shares held by the company's controlling Guireniao Group were judicially frozen. The freezing period is from August 1, 2019 to July 31, 2022.

In 2021, due to heavy debt, Guirenniao went through a court led restructuring. Grain giant Taifujingu Network Technology bought 20.4 percent stake in Guirenniao for CNY417 million (US$58 million). Guirenniao donated 30 million yuan in supplies to Henan floods silently. Many netizens purchased Guirenniao products to show their support.

In 2022, the firm changed its auditor twice in July and October. This many changes in a short period of time prompted Shanghai Stock Exchange to send an enquiry letter asking the firm to explain the reasons. In August 2022, Li Zhihua, chairman of Taifujingu, took the control of the firm. He pivoted the company into food-related businesses.

In 2023, it announced that the company will exit apparel market to instead focus on agricultural produce. Guirenniao also stated that it intends to lease its brands Guirenniao and Prince to other companies. In March 2023, Guirenniao entered ready-made dishes market and invested 100 million yuan in order to set up an industrial park which specialises in such dishes in Qiqihar. Grains became its largest revenue segment.

In February 2024, the China Securities Regulatory Commission opened a case against Guirenniao and its chairman Li Zhihua for suspected violations of information disclosure. In March 2024, company's listing status was terminated by Shanghai Stock Exchange as to its low share price breached the bourse rules. Guirenniao share price closed below CNY1 on February 1 and failed to recover by March 7 which triggered mandatory delisting condition. On March 7, its last trading day, price was 67 Chinese cents (US$9 cents) with a market cap of less than CNY1.1 billion (US$153.1 million).
