= Jean-Paul Eale Lutula =

Rwandan footballer

Personal information
- Full name: Jean-Paul Eale Lutula
- Date of birth: 4 October 1984 (age 42)
- Place of birth: Kinshasa, Zaire
- Position: Striker

Team information
- Current team: Kosova Schaerbeek

Senior career*
Years	Team	Apps	(Gls)
2001–2003	Saint Eloi Lupopo		
2004	AS Vita Club		
2005	Saint Eloi Lupopo		
2006–2007	DC Motema Pembe		
2007–2010	FC Brussels	51	(7)
2010	→ Yanbian FC (loan)	23	(12)
2011–2013	Muaither	27	(18)
2013-2014	Al Markhiya		
2015-2016	Diegem Sport		
2016-2017	RWDM47		

International career
2005	DR Congo	2	(1)
2009	Rwanda	3	(0)
- * Club domestic league appearances and goals as of 16 September 2011

Jean-Paul Eale Lutula (born 4 October 1984) is a footballer who is currently playing for Qatari club Muaither. Born in Zaire, he has represented both DR Congo and Rwanda at international level.

== Career ==
He has played for FC Brussels in the Belgian First Division and signed a loan contract in February 2010 with Chinese side Yanbian FC.
