= Zhanjiang Tiandi No.1 F.C. =

Association football club in Zhanjiang, Guangdong, China

Zhanjiang Tiandi No.1 湛江天地壹号
- Full name: Zhanjiang Tiandi No.1 FC 湛江天地壹号足球俱乐部
- Founded: 7 August 2007; 17 years ago
- Dissolved: December 2008 (16 years ago)
- Ground: Zhanjiang Sports Centre, Zhanjiang
- Capacity: 20,000
- League: China League Two
Home colours	Away colours

Zhanjiang Tiandi No.1 FC (Chinese: 湛江天地壹号足球俱乐部) was an association football club located in Zhanjiang, Guangdong, China.

== History ==
Guangdong Tiandi Food Group (sister company of Tiandi No.1 Beverage) invested 30 million Renminbi to found this club in 2007. Tiandi No.1 FC was the first professional football club in Zhanjiang's history.
