= Zengcheng Stadium =

Multi-purpose stadium in Guangzhou, China

Zengcheng Stadium 增城体育场
- Interactive map of Zengcheng Stadium 增城体育场
- Full name: Zengcheng Kangwei Stadium 增城康威体育运动场
- Location: Guangzhou, Guangdong, China
- Owner: Zengcheng People's Government
- Operator: Zengcheng Sports Development Centre
- Capacity: 12,000
- Surface: Grass

Construction
- Opened: September 2000

Zengcheng Stadium (Chinese: 增城体育场), or Zengcheng Kangwei Stadium (Chinese: 增城康威体育运动场) is a multi-purpose stadium in Zengcheng District, Guangzhou, Guangdong, China. It was invested by Guangzhou Kangwei Sporting Goods Co. Ltd. and named after them.

On 22 September 2002, the Hong Kong First Division League was hold in mainland China for the first time at Zengcheng Stadium, contested by Xiangxue Pharmaceutical and Double Flower. It served as the home stadium for Guangzhou Evergrande of the China League One in the 2010 league season.
