= Anhui Jiufang F.C. =

Chinese football club

Anhui Jiufang (安徽九方)
- Full name: Anhui Jiufang FC Co. Ltd. (安徽九方足球俱乐部有限责任公司)
- Founded: March 1, 2003 (22 years ago)
- Dissolved: January 2011 (14 years ago)
- Ground: Wuhu Olympic Stadium, Wuhu, China
- Capacity: 40,000
Home colours	Away colours

Anhui Jiufang Football Club (Chinese: 安徽九方; pinyin: Ānhuī Jiǔfāng) was a Chinese football club from Hefei, Anhui. The club was owned by Anhui Jiarun Group (Chinese: 安徽嘉润集团; pinyin: Ānhuī Jiārùn Jítuán) with 15,000,000 RMB registered capital. At the end of the 2008 season, Anhui Jiufang qualified from China League Two (3rd tier of Chinese football) to China League One (2nd tier of Chinese football).

Anhui Jiufang was replaced by Tianjin Runyulong at the beginning of the 2011 league season.

== Name history ==
- 2003–2004 Anhui Xuanfeng F.C. 安徽旋风
- 2005–2011 Anhui Jiufang F.C. 安徽九方

== Results ==
All-time league Ranking

Season	2003	2004	2005	2006	2007	2008	2009	2010
Division	3	3	3	3	3	2	2	2
Position	4^{1}	11^{1}	4	3	3	4	7	9

- ^1 in group stage
