= Li Chunman =

Chinese footballer (born 1962)

Li Chunman 李春满
Personal information
- Full name: Li Chunman
- Date of birth: 30 May 1962 (age 64)
- Place of birth: Yingkou, Liaoning, China
- Height: 1.68 m (5 ft 6 in)
- Position: Defender

Youth career
- 1977–1983: Liaoning

Senior career*
Years	Team	Apps	(Gls)
1983–1986	Liaoning	?	(?)

Managerial career
- 2015: Guizhou Renhe (caretaker)
- * Club domestic league appearances and goals

Li Chunman (Chinese: 李春满; Korean: 리춘만; born 30 May 1962) is a Chinese football manager and former football player of Korean descent. He is currently the assistant coach of Chinese Super League side Guizhou Renhe.

== Playing career ==
Li Chunman began football training when he studied at primary school and was selected to city's youth team in 1976. He was scouted by Liaoning coach Ni Jide in 1977. Li was promoted to the first team of Liaoning in 1983 but failed to established himself within the team. He announced his retirement in the middle of 1986.

== Management career ==
Li went to Beijing University of Physical Education in September 1986 where he received his bachelor's degree in 1990 and master's degree in 1992. He stayed at Beijing University of Physical Education (later changed its name as Beijing Sport University) as a teacher and coach of school football team after his graduation. He studied abroad at Seoul National University between 1996 and 1999 and received his doctor degree of sports psychology. He became a professor of football department at Beijing Sport University.

In February 2001, Li recommended himself to Chinese Jia-A League side Chongqing Lifan. Chongqing Lifan accepted his recommendation and appoint him as the interpreter and assistant coach of Korean manager Lee Jang-soo. He followed Lee Jang-soo to join another Jia-A League team Qingdao Etsong Hainiu in December 2001. He left Qingdao at the end of 2003 season after Lee Jang-soo's resignation. He joined China League One club Henan Construction as team leader and assistant coach in December 2013. However, he was taken place by Yin Lihua on 15 April 2004.

In December 2006, Li became the assistant coach of Chinese Super League side Beijing Guoan, rejoining Lee Jang-soo. He was sacked together with Lee Jang-soo on 16 September 2009. Lee Jang-soo invited him again after Lee became the manager of China League One side Guangzhou Evergrande, but Li was unable to join Guangzhou due to the heavy task of teaching at the university. Since Lee Jang-soo haven't the AFC Professional Coaching Diploma at the time, Li agreed to register as the manager of Guangzhou Evergrande in name.

In January 2013, Li became the assistant coach of Super League club Guizhou Renhe. He joined Henan Jianye in early 2014, assisting Tang Yaodong. He left Henan after Jia Xiuquan became the new manager of the club in June 2014. He returned to Guizhou Renhe and became their team leader for 2015 league season. On 28 April 2015, Li was appointed as the temporary manager after Zhu Jiong was sacked. He became the assistant coach again on 8 July 2015 when Gong Lei gained the manager position of the club.
