= Nanjing Baotai F.C. =

Chinese football club

Nanjing Baotai 南京宝泰
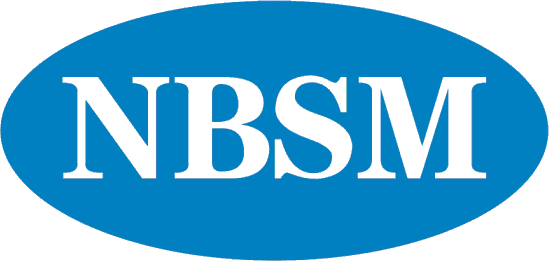
- Full name: Nanjing Baotai Football Club 南京宝泰足球俱乐部
- Founded: 2007; 18 years ago
- Ground: Hohai University Stadium, Nanjing
- Capacity: 5,000
- Chairman: Hang Yifu 杭逸夫
- Manager: Lu Changyu 芦长余
- League: China Yi League
Home colours	Away colours

Nanjing Baotai F.C. (Simplified Chinese: 南京宝泰足球俱乐部) is a semi-professional football club its based in Nanjing, China.

Nanjing Baotai F.C. founded by Nanjing Baotai Special Materials Co., LTD. in March 2007.
