= Beijing Institute of Technology F.C. =

Beijing Institute of Technology Football Club 北京理工
- Full name: Beijing Institute of Technology Football Club 北京理工足球俱乐部
- Nickname: Student Army (学生军)
- Founded: 1940; 86 years ago (University); 2000; 26 years ago (as Beijing Institute of Technology Football Club)
- Ground: BIT Eastern Athletic Field, Beijing
- Capacity: 5,000
- Chairman: Liu Qixiao (刘启孝)
- Manager: Yu Fei
- League: China League Two
- 2025: China League Two, 16th of 24
Home colours	Away colours

Beijing Institute of Technology Football Club (Chinese: 北京理工足球俱乐部; pinyin: Běijīng Lǐgōng Zúqiú Jùlèbù), or simply BIT, is a Chinese professional football club based in Beijing, that competes in China League Two, the third tier of Chinese football. BIT plays its home matches inside the main Beijing Institute of Technology campus, at the BIT Eastern Athletic Field, located within Haidian District. Their current majority shareholders are Beijing Institute of Technology (BIT) and Joan Oliver, who acquired a 29% stake on 5 December 2016.

The club was founded in 2000 by the Beijing Institute of Technology initially as a college football team, where they experienced significant success by winning four Chinese Collegiate Championships before deciding to enter the 2006 league campaign at the bottom of the professional Chinese football league pyramid in the third tier. After winning the 2006 division championship the club complied with the requirements of full professionalism by having their full-time students register as professionals, increasing player wages and gaining sponsorship. On 11 April 2017, the club announced a permanent separation between their University team and professional team.

== History ==
=== College football ===
In 2000 Beijing Institute of Technology (BIT), a co-educational public university, established an amateur football team to participate in the Chinese University Football League (CUFL, Simplified Chinese: 中国大学生足球联赛) after they separated from high school football team Beijing Sangao. The club would have an annual budget of 100,000 Yuan, with financial support coming from school grants, donations and corporate sponsorship. The players were paid 400 Yuan per month as a nominal allowance while continuing their studies. The club's recruitment policy saw them, particularly scout youth players, wishing to continue their education; however, Beijing Sangao would ultimately be the main source of their first roster.

After their debut in the 2001 Chinese Collegiate championship, the club went on to win the 2002, 2003, 2004 and 2006 championships. With this success, the team were invited by the Chinese Football Association to represent China in the 2003 Summer Universiade Games, where they placed seventh. Professional coach Jin Zhiyang was initially brought in for the tournament, however once the championship ended, he decided to stay on and publicly declared that this club should be participating within the Chinese national leagues. After participating in the 2005 Summer Universiade Games, BIT decided to participate at the bottom of the Chinese league pyramid in the third tier. In their debut season of the 2006 China League Two division, their roster consisted of 30 players, of which were eight graduate students and 22 university students, a statistic that the club would proudly proclaim made them the best educated team in Chinese history.

=== Professional football ===
On 2 November 2006 BIT beat Harbin Yiteng 3–0 to win the division championship and gained promotion to the second tier of Chinese football. The promotion drew great national attention because it was the first time a team consisting of full-time college students won such a promotion. Concerns were raised by the Chinese Ministry of Education about the impact that professional football would have on the students and whether a university should allow its sports team to participate in a professional league. The CFA would allow the club to participate in the league after giving them special dispensation, despite failing to move to a 20,000 seater stadium required for all professional football teams in the league. The club complied with the other requirements of professionalism when the owners had to register all the players as footballers rather than students and increased their wages to 1,000 Yuan per month. Sponsorship was required to help pay for running costs, which had risen to 15 million Yuan a year. Their first sponsors were Beijing Huaqi Information Digital Technology Co., Ltd., who signed a two-year sponsorship contract worth 6 million Yuan over two years. With the new sponsor the club changed its name to Beijing Patriotic Students and finished the league campaign in 11th place.

In the 2008 league season Beijing Huaqi Information Digital Technology Co., Ltd. decided to change the club's name to Beijing Aigo to reflect their ownership of the Aigo brand. In the following season, the club signed a new one-year sponsorship for 3 million Yuan, which changed the club's name to Beijing Guirenniao. When this sponsorship ended at the beginning of the 2010 league season, the club was in a precarious financial situation that required the Beijing Sports Bureau to step in with a 400 million Yuan investment. The departure of Cao Xiandong as coach further exacerbated the difficulties the club were facing and Zhang Ning was appointed to help the club avoid relegation. After avoiding relegation at the beginning of the 2011 league season, the club were able to regain a sponsorship contract with sports manufacturer 361° International Limited for 5.5 million Yuan, which resulted in a change of name to Beijing 361° Students. Throughout this, the club has continued to move into the realm of professionalism with the inclusion of professional foreign imports such as Dutch-born Raphael Maitimo. However, the club still stuck to its collegiate roots by competing within the 2011 Summer Universiade and 2015 Summer Universiade games despite the exclusions of many of their fully professional players as well as the significant shift of ownership, with Xinyuan Real Estate becoming their second largest shareholder on 9 April 2015.

On 5 December 2016, Joan Oliver, owner of Spanish club CF Reus, acquired a 29% stake in the club along with the president of FC Barcelona Joan Laporta. The deal would make them the first ever direct foreign owners of a Chinese club. Joan Oliver, in his first press conference as owner of Beijing BIT, announced a permanent separation between the club's University team and its professional team.

== Name history ==
- 2000–2006 Beijing Institute of Technology Football Club 北京理工大学足球俱乐部
- 2007 Beijing Patriots Students Football Team 北京爱国者大学生足球队
- 2008 Beijing Aigo College Student Football Team 北京爱国者大学生足球队
- 2009 Beijing Guirenniao Student Football Team 北京贵人鸟大学生足球俱乐部
- 2010 Beijing Institute of Technology Football Club 北京理工大学足球俱乐部
- 2011 Beijing 361 ° Students Football Team 北京361°大学生足球俱乐部
- 2012–Present Beijing Institute of Technology Football Club 北京理工足球俱乐部

== Players ==
=== Current squad ===
As of 1 March 2024

Note: Flags indicate national team as defined under FIFA eligibility rules; some limited exceptions apply. Players may hold more than one non-FIFA nationality.

No.	Pos.	Nation	Player
1	GK	CHN	Fu Jingyu
2	DF	CHN	Zhang Haolin
3	DF	CHN	Li Xiantao
4	DF	CHN	Guo Mengyuan
5	DF	CHN	Guo Mengjie
6	MF	CHN	Zhao Zhengjun
8	MF	CHN	Sun Jiale
9	FW	CHN	Huang Yi
10	MF	CHN	Wang Jian
11	FW	CHN	Chen Jidong
12	GK	CHN	Feng Siman
13	DF	CHN	Zhen Jingbo
14	DF	CHN	Wang Minjie
17	FW	CHN	Li Xiangyu
18	FW	CHN	Li Mengyang
19	MF	CHN	Cui Hao

No.	Pos.	Nation	Player
20	MF	CHN	Ye Maoshen
21	MF	CHN	Liu Haohan
22	MF	CHN	Huang Junye
24	MF	CHN	Zheng Zehao
25	FW	CHN	Li Zongcan
27	DF	CHN	Jia Hanlin
29	FW	CHN	Tan Dinghao
30	MF	CHN	Li Zhaolong
31	MF	CHN	Li Libo
33	DF	CHN	Gou Xuanrui
35	FW	CHN	Zhao Haoyu
37	MF	CHN	Ma Chuhang
38	DF	CHN	Han Lei
39	FW	CHN	Wang Chenyang
43	GK	CHN	Li Chuyu
44	DF	CHN	Tai Atai
—	DF	CHN	Liu Zongyuan (at Henan until 31 December 2024)
—	MF	CHN	Hua Mingcan (at Henan until 31 December 2024)

== Coaching staff ==
Position	Staff
Head coach	(China) Yu Fei
Assistant coach	
Goalkeeping coach	
Fitness coach	

Source: sina.com

=== Managerial history ===
- (China) Jin Zhiyang (2003 – 2007)
- (China) Cao Xiandong (2008 – 2009)
- (China) Zhang Ning (2010)
- (China) Bian Lijun (2011 – 31 December 2012)
- (China) Yuan Wei (1 January 2013 – July 2016)
- (Spain) Robert Ahufinger (July 2016 – 7 August 2018)
- (Spain) Javier Aguelades (7 August 2018 – 31 December 2019)
- (China) Yu Fei (1 January 2020 – )

== Honours ==
- China League Two (tier-III)
  - Champions (1): 2006
- China University Championship
  - Champions (8): 2001/02, 2002/03. 2003/04, 2005/06, 2010/11, 2012/13, 2013/14, 2014/15

== Results ==
=== All-time CUFL League Rankings ===
- As of the end of 2019 season.

Season	00/01	01/02	02/03	03/04	04/05	05/06	06/07	07/08	08/09	09/10	10/11	11/12	12/13	13/14	14/15	15/16	16/17	17/18	18/19
Position	3	1	1	1	4	1	4^{1}	3	7	-^{2}	1	-^{2}	1^{3}	1^{3}	1^{3}	1^{3}	-^{2}	3	1

- ^1 in Final round group stage
  ^2 did not enter the final stage
  ^3 in the Senior Zone.

=== All-time Professional League Rankings ===
- As of the end of 2019 season.

Year	Div	Pld	W	D	L	GF	GA	GD	Pts	Pos.	FA Cup	Super Cup	AFC	Att./G	Stadium
2006	3	21	12	8	1	45	13	32	35^{1}	1	DNQ	DNQ	DNQ		BIT Eastern Athletic Field
2007	2	24	5	7	12	27	40	−13	22	11	NH	DNQ	DNQ		BIT Eastern Athletic Field
2008	2	24	7	7	10	27	39	−12	28	7	NH	DNQ	DNQ		BIT Eastern Athletic Field
2009	2	24	7	7	10	29	33	−4	28	8	NH	DNQ	DNQ		BIT Eastern Athletic Field
2010	2	24	4	6	14	22	40	−18	18	12	NH	DNQ	DNQ		BIT Eastern Athletic Field
2011	2	26	5	9	12	15	33	−18	24	13	R1	DNQ	DNQ		BIT Eastern Athletic Field
2012	2	30	8	8	14	27	41	−14	32	14	R2	DNQ	DNQ	1,491	BIT Eastern Athletic Field
2013	2	30	10	5	15	32	42	−10	35	9	R2	DNQ	DNQ	1,792	BIT Eastern Athletic Field
2014	2	30	11	4	15	46	57	−11	37	9	R3	DNQ	DNQ	1,637	BIT Eastern Athletic Field
2015	2	30	8	5	17	40	64	−24	29	15	R2	DNQ	DNQ	1,749	BIT Eastern Athletic Field
2016	3	20	5	7	8	19	29	-10	22	15	R1	DNQ	DNQ	748	BIT Eastern Athletic Field
2017	3	24	6	8	10	30	33	-3	26	15	R1	DNQ	DNQ	582	BIT Eastern Athletic Field
2018	3	28	9	3	16	44	59	-9	30	21	R2	DNQ	DNQ	343	BIT Eastern Athletic Field
2019	3	30	9	3	18	36	61	-25	30^{1}	20	R2	DNQ	DNQ		BIT Eastern Athletic Field

- ^1 In group stage.

Key

	China top division
	China second division
	China third division
W	Winners
RU	Runners-up
3	Third place
	Relegated

- Pld = Played
- W = Games won
- D = Games drawn
- L = Games lost
- F = Goals for
- A = Goals against
- Pts = Points
- Pos = Final position
- DNQ = Did not qualify
- DNE = Did Not Enter
- NH = Not Held
- – = Does Not Exist
- R1 = Round 1
- R2 = Round 2
- R3 = Round 3
- R4 = Round 4
- F = Final
- SF = Semi-finals
- QF = Quarter-finals
- R16 = Round of 16
- Group = Group stage
- GS2 = Second Group stage
- QR1 = First Qualifying Round
- QR2 = Second Qualifying Round
- QR3 = Third Qualifying Round

== See also ==
- Beijing Institute of Technology
