= Shaanxi Wuzhou F.C. =

Shaanxi Wuzhou 陕西五洲
- Full name: Shaanxi Wuzhou Football Club; Chinese: 陕西五洲足球俱乐部
- Founded: 5 February 2007; 19 years ago
- Dissolved: 31 January 2015; 11 years ago

Shaanxi Wuzhou Football Club (Chinese: 陕西五洲足球俱乐部) was a Chinese professional football club based in Xi'an, Shaanxi which last played in the China League One division.

The club was originally formed on February 5, 2007, as Guangdong Sunray Cave F.C. and was once owned by Guangdong Sports Bureau and Sunray Cave Group. In November 2014, a group of local companies from Shaanxi Province collectively acquired the full ownership of the club and subsequently renamed it to Shaanxi Wuzhou F.C., following the club's relocation to the Shaanxi Province Stadium in Xi'an. However, the club failed to settle the wages of the players for 2014 season and was forbidden to play in the Chinese football league system by Chinese Football Association.

== History ==
The Sunray Cave Group who had previously owned Guangzhou F.C. and the third-tier football club Guangzhou Sunray Cave Easter founded Guangdong Sunray Cave Football Club on February 5, 2007, with the Guangdong Sports Bureau to take part in the third tier of Chinese football with a team predominantly built from the Guangdong youth team. In the club's debut season Cao Yang was brought in as their manager while the team played in the 8,000 seater Nanhai District Stadium in Foshan, Guangdong. Playing in an orange top, black shorts and orange socks for their home kits and an all white outfit for the away kits the team finished bottom within their group at the end at the end of the 2007 league season. The following 2008 league campaign saw the team move into the 36,686 seater Century Lotus Stadium in Foshan where they matured into genuine division championship contenders and came runners-up within the league, winning promotion to the second tier.

The club's debut season in the second division saw them move into the 12,000 capacity Huangpu Sports Center in Huangpu District, Guangzhou and they ended the campaign in a respectable fifth. The following season saw the owners wanting to move into the 15,000 capacity Guangdong Provincial People's Stadium, however it was going through renovation and the team had to use the Dongguan Stadium, Huangpu Sports Center and University of Technology Stadium before they finally moved in. With the team settled in results significantly improved within the 2011 campaign with the club looking like genuine promotion contenders until on September 24, 2011, they lost a league against Shenyang Dongjin 3–2 and the club were unable to recover for the final run in for promotion. After the club's failed promotion attempt Dragan Kokotović was brought in to provide more experience, however he left on March 27, 2012, after only several games and Cao was brought back as a caretaker manager. On July 29, 2012 José Ricardo Rambo came in as permanent manager while Cao became General manager. José time as manager was not a success and Guangdong became embroiled in a relegation battle, which saw the chairman Lin Qin bring back Cao once again on August 30, 2012, as a caretaker manager and relegate José as his assistant for the rest of the 2012 league campaign.

On 14 December 2014, a group of local companies from Shaanxi Province collectively acquired the full ownership of the club and subsequently renamed it to Shaanxi Wuzhou F.C. However, the club failed to register for the 2015 league season due to wage arrears. On 31 January 2015, the club was forbidden to play in the Chinese football league system by Chinese Football Association, and was dissolved soon after.

=== Name changes ===
- 2007–2014: Guangdong Sunray Cave (广东日之泉)
- 2015: Shaanxi Wuzhou (陕西五洲)

== Kit colours ==
2007 Home

2007 Away

2011 Home

2011 Away

2012 Home

2012 Away

== Honours ==
- League Level 2
  - National 2nd Runners-up (3): 2011
  - National 2nd Runners-up (3): 2013
- League Level 3
  - Southern Champions (1): 2008
  - National Runners-up (2): 2008

== Results ==
All-time League Rankings

- As of the end of 2014 season.

Year	Div	Pld	W	D	L	GF	GA	GD	Pts	Pos.	FA Cup	Super Cup	AFC	Att./G	Stadium
2007	3	12	2	1	9	11	21	−10	7	7^{1}	NH	DNQ	–		Nanhai District Stadium
2008	3	17	11	4	2	38	18	+20	31	RU	NH	DNQ	–		Century Lotus Stadium
2009	2	24	10	5	9	37	37	0	35	5	NH	DNQ	–		Huangpu Sports Center
2010	2	24	5	7	12	34	39	−5	22	11	NH	DNQ	–		Guangdong Provincial People's Stadium ^{2}
2011	2	26	13	7	6	42	29	+13	46	3	R3	DNQ	–		Guangdong Provincial People's Stadium
2012	2	30	10	8	12	41	46	−5	38	10	R3	DNQ	–	1,104	Guangdong Provincial People's Stadium / Guangdong Olympic Stadium
2013	2	30	17	6	7	51	29	+22	57	3	R4	DNQ	–	2,935	Guangdong Provincial People's Stadium / Century Lotus Stadium
2014	2	30	6	12	12	36	47	−11	30	13	R3	DNQ	–	1,383	Huangpu Sports Center

- ^1 In southern group ^2 Had to use several other stadiums: see Home Stadiums

Key

	China top division
	China second division
	China third division
W	Champions
RU	Runners-up
3	Third place
	Relegated

- Pld = Played
- W = Games won
- D = Games drawn
- L = Games lost
- F = Goals for
- A = Goals against
- Pts = Points
- Pos = Final position
- DNQ = Did not qualify
- DNE = Did not enter
- NH = Not Held
- - = Does Not Exist
- R1 = Round 1
- R2 = Round 2
- R3 = Round 3
- R4 = Round 4
- F = Final
- SF = Semi-finals
- QF = Quarter-finals
- R16 = Round of 16
- Group = Group stage
- GS2 = Second Group stage
- QR1 = First Qualifying Round
- QR2 = Second Qualifying Round
- QR3 = Third Qualifying Round

== Managerial history ==
- (China) Cao Yang (February 5, 2007 – January 1, 2012)
- (Serbia) Dragan Kokotović (January 5, 2012 – March 27, 2012)
- (China) Cao Yang (interim) (March 27, 2012–28 July 2012)
- (Brazil) José Ricardo Rambo (July 29, 2012 – August 30, 2012)
- (China) Cao Yang (interim) (30 August 2012 – January 3, 2013)
- (China) Zhang Jun (January 3, 2013 – January 2, 2014)
- (Chile) Julio César Moreno (January 2, 2014 – April 20, 2014)
- (China) Feng Feng (interim) (April 20, 2014 – May 13, 2014)
- (China) Mai Chao (May 13, 2014 – November 2014)
- (Spain) Alejandro Menéndez (December 28, 2014 – 2015)

== Past and present Internationals ==
Names in bold indicate players who had international cap when played for Guangdong Sunray Cave F.C.

Bosnia and Herzegovina

- (Bosnia and Herzegovina) Petar Jelić (2014)

China PR

- (China) Ye Weichao (2007–10, 2014)

Costa Rica

- (Costa Rica) Darío Delgado (2011)

Hong Kong

- (Hong Kong) **Chan Siu Ki** (2012–13)
- (Hong Kong) **Leung Chun Pong** (2012–13)

Mali

- (Mali) Mourtala Diakité (2011)

Uruguay

- (Uruguay) Carlos Andrés García (2013–14)

Brazil

- (Brazil) Joel Bertoti Padilha (2009–10)
