= 1984 AFC Asian Cup squads =

Squad lists of 1984 AFC Asian Cup national teams

Squads for the 1984 AFC Asian Cup tournament.

== Group A ==
=== Kuwait ===
Head coach: (Brazil) Antônio Lopes

No.	Pos.	Player	Date of birth (age)	Caps	Goals	Club
1	GK	Khaled Al-Shemmari	1965			(Kuwait Football Association) Kazma
2	DF	Naeem Saad	1 October 1957 (aged 27)			(Kuwait Football Association) Al-Tadamon
3	DF	Mahboub Juma'a	17 September 1955 (aged 29)			(Kuwait Football Association) Al-Salmiya
4	DF	Jamal Al-Qabandi	7 April 1959 (aged 25)			(Kuwait Football Association) Kazma
5	DF	Waleed Al-Jasem	18 November 1959 (aged 20)			(Kuwait Football Association) Kuwait SC
6	FW	Abdulaziz Al-Buloushi	4 December 1962 (aged 21)			(Kuwait Football Association) Al-Arabi
7	MF	Abdullah Al-Shemmari	26 September 1960 (aged 24)			(Kuwait Football Association) Kuwait SC
8	MF	Abdullah Al-Buloushi	16 February 1960 (aged 24)			(Kuwait Football Association) Al-Arabi
11	FW	Amer Al-Amer				(Kuwait Football Association) Kuwait SC
12	MF	Yusuf Al-Suwayed	20 September 1958 (aged 26)			(Kuwait Football Association) Kazma
14	DF	Hamoud Al-Shemmari	26 September 1960 (aged 24)			(Kuwait Football Association) Kazma
15	DF	Sami Al-Hashash	15 September 1959 (aged 25)			(Kuwait Football Association) Al-Arabi
16	FW	Faisal Al-Dakheel	13 August 1957 (aged 27)			(Kuwait Football Association) Al-Qadisiya
17	MF	Majed Sultan				(Kuwait Football Association) Al-Arabi
18	MF	Mohammed Karam	1 January 1955 (aged 29)			(Kuwait Football Association) Al-Arabi
20	FW	Moayyad Al-Haddad	3 March 1960 (aged 24)			(Kuwait Football Association) Khaitan
22	GK	Samir Said	5 November 1963 (aged 21)			(Kuwait Football Association) Al-Arabi
23	GK	Mutair Mutair				(Kuwait Football Association) Al Jahra

=== Qatar ===
Head coach: (Brazil) Ronaldo de Carvalho

No.	Pos.	Player	Date of birth (age)	Caps	Goals	Club
1	GK	Younes Ahmed	17 August 1963 (aged 21)			(Qatar Football Association) Al Rayyan
2	DF	Mohammed Al-Sowaidi	25 June 1962 (aged 22)			(Qatar Football Association) Al Rayyan
3	DF	Majed Maayouf	4 October 1961 (aged 23)			(Qatar Football Association) Qatar SC
4	DF	Abdullah Al-Edan	5 August 1962 (aged 22)			(Qatar Football Association) Al Ahli
5	FW	Mubarak Anber	1 January 1954 (aged 30)			(Qatar Football Association) Al Sadd
6	DF	Ibrahim Al-Rumahi				(Qatar Football Association) Al Ahli
7	MF	Mohamed Saeed Afifa	6 December 1962 (aged 21)			(Qatar Football Association) Al Rayyan
8	MF	Mohammed Al Ammari	10 December 1965 (aged 18)			(Qatar Football Association) Al Sadd
9	FW	Man'a Al-Barshi				(Qatar Football Association)
10	MF	Mubarak Salem Al-Khater	8 January 1966 (aged 18)			(Qatar Football Association) Al Wakrah
11	FW	Saleh Eid Al-Mehaizaa	8 October 1965 (aged 19)			(Qatar Football Association) Al Shamal
12	MF	Ali Zaid	21 April 1962 (aged 22)			(Qatar Football Association) Al Arabi
13	FW	Mohammed Al-Mohanadi				(Qatar Football Association)
14	MF	Ibrahim Khalfan	25 November 1961 (aged 23)			(Qatar Football Association) Al Arabi
15	FW	Mansoor Muftah	22 November 1955 (aged 29)			(Qatar Football Association) Al Rayyan
16	MF	Khalid Salman	5 April 1962 (aged 22)			(Qatar Football Association) Al Sadd
17	DF	Issa Al-Mohammadi	19 December 1963 (aged 20)			(Qatar Football Association) Al Ahli
18	GK	Sami Mohamed Wafa				(Qatar Football Association) Al Sadd

=== Saudi Arabia ===
Head coach: Khalil Al-Zayani

No.	Pos.	Player	Date of birth (age)	Caps	Goals	Club
1	GK	Abdullah Al-Deayea	1 December 1961 (aged 23)			(Saudi Arabian Football Federation) Al-Ta'ee
2	DF	Nasser Al-Mansoor				(Saudi Arabian Football Federation) Al-Nahda
3	DF	Hussein Al-Bishi	13 June 1961 (aged 23)			(Saudi Arabian Football Federation) Al-Hilal
4	DF	Sameer Abdulshaker	20 May 1960 (aged 24)			(Saudi Arabian Football Federation) Ohod Club
5	DF	Saleh Al-Nu'eimeh	24 June 1957 (aged 27)			(Saudi Arabian Football Federation) Al-Hilal
6	MF	Yahya Amer	17 June 1960 (aged 24)			(Saudi Arabian Football Federation) Al-Ahli
7	FW	Shaye Al-Nafisah	20 March 1962 (aged 22)			(Saudi Arabian Football Federation) Al-Kawkab
8	FW	Yousef Khamees	16 August 1961 (aged 23)			(Saudi Arabian Football Federation) Al-Nassr
9	FW	Majed Abdullah	1 November 1959 (aged 25)			(Saudi Arabian Football Federation) Al-Nassr
10	MF	Fahad Al-Musaibeah	4 April 1961 (aged 23)			(Saudi Arabian Football Federation) Al-Hilal
11	FW	Mohaisen Al-Jam'an	6 April 1966 (aged 18)			(Saudi Arabian Football Federation) Al-Nassr
12	MF	Yousef Anbar	28 November 1962 (aged 22)			(Saudi Arabian Football Federation) Al-Ahli
13	DF	Mohamed Abd Al-Jawad	28 November 1962 (aged 22)			(Saudi Arabian Football Federation) Al-Ahli
14	MF	Saleh Khalifa Al-Dosari	2 May 1954 (aged 30)			(Saudi Arabian Football Federation) Al-Ettifaq
15	DF	Salman Al-Dosari	10 November 1963 (aged 21)			(Saudi Arabian Football Federation) Al-Ettifaq
16	FW	Musaed Ibrahim	18 November 1965 (aged 19)			(Saudi Arabian Football Federation) Al Shabab
17	MF	Bandar Al-Nakhli	25 October 1965 (aged 19)			(Saudi Arabian Football Federation) Al-Ahli
21	GK	Mohammed Al-Husain	10 April 1960 (aged 24)			(Saudi Arabian Football Federation) Al Shabab

=== South Korea ===
Head coach: (South Korea) Moon Jung-sik

No.	Pos.	Player	Date of birth (age)	Caps	Goals	Club
1	GK	Choi In-young	5 March 1962 (aged 22)			(Korea Football Association) Hyundai Horangi
2	DF	Park Kyung-hoon	19 January 1961 (aged 23)			(Korea Football Association) POSCO Dolphins
3	DF	Chung Jong-soo	27 March 1961 (aged 23)			(Korea Football Association) Yukong Elephants
4	DF	Kim Pyung-seok	22 September 1958 (aged 26)			(Korea Football Association) Hyundai Horangi
5	DF	Chung Yong-hwan	10 February 1960 (aged 24)			(Korea Football Association) Daewoo Royals
6	DF	Park Sung-hwa	7 May 1955 (aged 29)			(Korea Football Association) Hallelujah FC
7	MF	Jang Jung	5 May 1964 (aged 20)			(Korea Football Association) Ajou University
8	FW	Lee Tae-ho	29 January 1961 (aged 23)			(Korea Football Association) Daewoo Royals
9	MF	Huh Jung-moo	13 January 1955 (aged 29)			(Korea Football Association) Hyundai Horangi
10	FW	Park Chang-sun	2 February 1954 (aged 30)			(Korea Football Association) Daewoo Royals
11	MF	Lee Kang-jo	27 October 1954 (aged 30)			(Korea Football Association) Yukong Elephants
12	MF	Lee Boo-yeol	16 October 1958 (aged 26)			(Korea Football Association) Kookmin Bank
13	FW	Choi Jin-han	22 June 1966 (aged 18)			(Korea Football Association) Myongji University
14	FW	Byun Byung-Joo	26 April 1961 (aged 23)			(Korea Football Association) Daewoo Royals
15	DF	Yoo Byung-ok	2 March 1964 (aged 20)			(Korea Football Association) Hanyang University
16	FW	Kim Seok-won	7 November 1961 (aged 23)			(Korea Football Association) Yukong Elephants
17	FW	Choi Sang-kook	15 February 1961 (aged 23)			(Korea Football Association) POSCO Dolphins
18	FW	Choi Gwang-ji	5 June 1963 (aged 21)			(Korea Football Association) Kwangwoon University
20	MF	Wang Sun-jae	16 March 1959 (aged 25)			(Korea Football Association) Hanil Bank FC
21	GK	Chung Ki-dong	13 May 1961 (aged 23)			(Korea Football Association) POSCO Dolphins

=== Syria ===
Head coach: Avedis Kavlakian

No.	Pos.	Player	Date of birth (age)	Caps	Goals	Club
1	GK	Samir Layla	31 January 1961 (aged 23)			(Syrian Football Association) Al Ittihad
2	DF	Raghed Khalil				(Syrian Football Association) Al-Jaish
3	DF	Mohammed Dahman	8 May 1959 (aged 25)			(Syrian Football Association) Al-Jaish
4	MF	George Khouri	1962 (age 22)			(Syrian Football Association) Al-Jaish
5	DF	Essam Mahrous				(Syrian Football Association) Al-Jaish
6	FW	Waleed Abou El-Sil	1963 (age 21)			(Syrian Football Association) Al-Jaish
7	MF	Kevork Mardikian	24 July 1954 (aged 30)			(Syrian Football Association) Al-Jaish
8	MF	Abdul Kader Kardaghli	1 January 1961 (aged 23)			(Syrian Football Association) Al-Jaish
9	FW	Fouad Aziz	1962			(Syrian Football Association) Al-Shorta
10	FW	Marwan Madarati	18 March 1959 (aged 25)			(Syrian Football Association) Al-Jaish
11	FW	Essam Zeino				(Syrian Football Association) Al-Jaish
12	MF	Ahmad Darwish				(Syrian Football Association) Al-Wahda
13	MF	Husam Hourani	20 April 1960 (aged 24)			(Syrian Football Association) Al-Jaish
14	MF	Nabil El-Sibai				(Syrian Football Association) Al-Karamah SC
15	DF	Abdul Nafee Hamwieh				(Syrian Football Association) Al-Karamah SC
16	DF	Radwan Hassan				(Syrian Football Association) Al-Jaish
17	FW	Mouaffak Kanaan				(Syrian Football Association) Tishreen
22	GK	Malek Shakuhi	5 April 1960 (aged 24)			(Syrian Football Association) Al-Jaish

== Group B ==
=== China ===
Head coach: Zeng Xuelin

No.	Pos.	Player	Date of birth (age)	Caps	Goals	Club
1	GK	Lu Jianren	14 January 1960 (aged 24)	1	0	(Chinese Football Association) Beijing
2	DF	Zhu Bo	24 September 1960 (aged 24)	15	0	(Chinese Football Association) August 1st
3	DF	Lin Lefeng	16 October 1955 (aged 29)	51	1	(Chinese Football Association) Liaoning
4	MF	Lü Hongxiang	27 March 1960 (aged 24)	16	0	(Chinese Football Association) Tianjin City
5	DF	Jia Xiuquan	9 November 1963 (aged 21)	15	1	(Chinese Football Association) August 1st
6	MF	Lin Qiang	13 January 1960 (aged 24)	15	1	(Chinese Football Association) Hubei
7	MF	Gu Guangming	31 January 1959 (aged 25)	36	10	(Chinese Football Association) Guangdong
8	FW	Zhao Dayu	17 January 1961 (aged 23)	17	11	(Chinese Football Association) Guangzhou
9	MF	Zuo Shusheng	13 April 1958 (aged 26)	42	10	(Chinese Football Association) Tianjin City
10	FW	Li Hui	12 February 1960 (aged 24)	14	6	(Chinese Football Association) Beijing
11	FW	Li Huayun	22 September 1963 (aged 21)	11	5	(Chinese Football Association) Liaoning
12	DF	Chi Minghua	6 March 1962 (aged 22)	6	0	(Chinese Football Association) Guangdong
14	MF	Wu Yuhua	1 December 1960 (aged 24)	1	0	(Chinese Football Association) Guangdong
15	MF	Qin Guorong	1 May 1961 (aged 23)	8	0	(Chinese Football Association) Shanghai
16	FW	Liu Haiguang	11 July 1963 (aged 21)	9	1	(Chinese Football Association) Shanghai
17	MF	Yang Zhaohui	14 September 1962 (aged 22)	2	2	(Chinese Football Association) Beijing
19	DF	Wang Dongning	13 April 1961 (aged 23)	0	0	(Chinese Football Association) Shandong
22	GK	Yang Ning	10 April 1962 (aged 22)	13	0	(Chinese Football Association) Guangdong

=== India ===
Head coach: (Socialist Federal Republic of Yugoslavia) Milovan Ćirić

No.	Pos.	Player	Date of birth (age)	Caps	Goals	Club
1	GK	Atanu Bhattacharya				(All India Football Federation) Mohammedan
20	GK	Brahmanand Sankhwalkar	6 March 1955 (aged 29)			(All India Football Federation) Salgaocar
2	DF	Pem Dorji	1 January 1959 (aged 25)			(All India Football Federation) Mohammedan
3	DF	Tarun Dey				(All India Football Federation) East Bengal
4	DF	Sudip Chatterjee	5 February 1959 (aged 25)			(All India Football Federation) East Bengal
5	DF	Krishnendu Roy				(All India Football Federation) Mohun Bagan
16	DF	Subrata Bhattacharya	5 May 1953 (aged 31)			(All India Football Federation) Mohun Bagan
12	DF	Derrick Pereira	17 March 1962 (aged 22)			(All India Football Federation) Tata FA
7	MF	Bikash Panji				(All India Football Federation) Mohun Bagan
6	MF	Prasanta Banerjee	2 February 1958 (aged 26)			(All India Football Federation) Mohun Bagan
14	MF	Parminder Singh	5 May 1957 (aged 27)			(All India Football Federation) JCT Mills
17	MF	Mauricio Afonso	16 November 1961 (aged 23)			(All India Football Federation) Dempo SC
9	MF	Narender Thapa	22 September 1964 (aged 20)			(All India Football Federation) Mohammedan
10	FW	Shabbir Ali	26 January 1956 (aged 28)			(All India Football Federation) Mohammedan
15	FW	Babu Mani	1963			(All India Football Federation) Mohun Bagan
8	FW	Krishanu Dey	14 February 1962 (aged 22)			(All India Football Federation) Mohun Bagan
11	FW	Biswajit Bhattacharya	6 May 1960 (aged 24)			(All India Football Federation) East Bengal
18	DF	Abdul Majeed Kakroo				(All India Football Federation) Road Transport Corporation

=== Iran ===
Head coach: Nasser Ebrahimi

No.	Pos.	Player	Date of birth (age)	Caps	Goals	Club
1	GK	Behrouz Soltani	31 December 1957 (aged 26)			(Football Federation Islamic Republic of Iran) Persepolis
2	DF	Shahin Bayani	31 January 1962 (aged 22)			(Football Federation Islamic Republic of Iran) Esteghlal
3	DF	Asghar Hajiloo	1 August 1956 (aged 28)			(Football Federation Islamic Republic of Iran) Esteghlal
4	DF	Ahmad Sanjari	22 February 1960 (aged 24)			(Football Federation Islamic Republic of Iran) Homa
5	DF	Mohammad Panjali	27 May 1955 (aged 29)			(Football Federation Islamic Republic of Iran) Persepolis
6	MF	Zia Arabshahi	6 June 1958 (aged 26)			(Football Federation Islamic Republic of Iran) Persepolis
7	FW	Nasser Mohammadkhani	7 September 1957 (aged 27)			(Football Federation Islamic Republic of Iran) Persepolis
8	MF	Shahrokh Bayani	31 December 1960 (aged 23)			(Football Federation Islamic Republic of Iran) Esteghlal
9	FW	Hamid Derakhshan	13 January 1958 (aged 26)			(Football Federation Islamic Republic of Iran) Persepolis
10	FW	Hamid Alidousti	1 January 1956 (aged 28)			(Football Federation Islamic Republic of Iran) Homa
11	FW	Abdolali Changiz	13 March 1959 (aged 25)			(Football Federation Islamic Republic of Iran) Esteghlal
12	DF	Mohammad Reza Shakourzadeh	1957			(Football Federation Islamic Republic of Iran) Shahin
14	MF	Reza Ahadi	30 November 1962 (aged 22)			(Football Federation Islamic Republic of Iran) Esteghlal
15	DF	Rahim Mirakhori	30 April 1956 (aged 28)			(Football Federation Islamic Republic of Iran) Bank Melli F.C.
16	FW	Jafar Mokhtarifar	7 September 1957 (aged 27)			(Football Federation Islamic Republic of Iran) Esteghlal
17	FW	Gholamreza Fathabadi	31 December 1957 (aged 26)			(Football Federation Islamic Republic of Iran) Persepolis
18	MF	Saeid Maragehchian				(Football Federation Islamic Republic of Iran) Esteghlal
22	GK	Hafez Tahouni	1953			(Football Federation Islamic Republic of Iran) Bank Melli F.C.

=== Singapore ===
Head coach: Hussein Al-Junied

No.	Pos.	Player	Date of birth (age)	Caps	Goals	Club
1	GK	David Lee	10 April 1958 (aged 26)			(Football Association of Singapore) Tiong Bahru
2	MF	Lim Tang Boon				(Football Association of Singapore) Changi CSC
3	DF	Norhalis Shafik				(Football Association of Singapore) Geylang International
4	MF	Latif Rahman				(Football Association of Singapore) Singapore Armed Forces
5	DF	Hazali Nasiron				(Football Association of Singapore) Police SA
6	DF	Marzuki Elias				(Football Association of Singapore) Farrer Park United
7	MF	Darimosuvito Tokijan	14 February 1963 (aged 21)			(Football Association of Singapore) Jurong Town
9	DF	Au Yeong Pak Kuan	24 August 1960 (aged 24)			(Football Association of Singapore) Changi CSC
10	FW	Kuniuraman Kannan				(Football Association of Singapore) Jurong Town
11	FW	Razali Rashid				(Football Association of Singapore) Farrer Park United
12	MF	Malek Awab	11 January 1961 (aged 23)			(Football Association of Singapore) Farrer Park United
14	FW	S. Ramu				(Football Association of Singapore) Tampines Rovers
15	DF	Terry Pathmanathan	9 February 1956 (aged 28)			(Football Association of Malaysia) Pahang FA
16	MF	Sudiat Dali	20 February 1962 (aged 22)			(Football Association of Singapore) Geylang International
17	FW	Tay Peng Kee	19 October 1961 (aged 23)			(Football Association of Singapore) Geylang International
18	DF	Razali Saad	14 August 1964 (aged 20)			(Football Association of Singapore) Singapore Armed Forces
22	GK	Kumar Krishnan				(Football Association of Singapore) Singapore Armed Forces
23	GK	Yakob Hashim	8 November 1960 (aged 24)			(Football Association of Singapore) Police SA

=== United Arab Emirates ===
Head coach: (Brazil) Carlos Alberto Parreira

No.	Pos.	Player	Date of birth (age)	Caps	Goals	Club
1	GK	Abdullah Musa Abdullah	2 March 1958 (aged 26)			(United Arab Emirates Football Association) Al-Alhi
2	DF	Khalil Ghanim Mubarak	12 November 1964 (aged 20)			(United Arab Emirates Football Association) Al-Khaleej
3	DF	Hasan Ali Mohamed				(United Arab Emirates Football Association)
4	DF	Mubarak Ghanim Mubarak	3 September 1963 (aged 21)			(United Arab Emirates Football Association) Al-Khaleej
5	DF	Abdullah Ali Sultan	1 October 1963 (aged 21)			(United Arab Emirates Football Association) Al-Khaleej
6	FW	Hasan Abdulwahab Al-Qadhi				(United Arab Emirates Football Association)
7	FW	Fahad Khamees Mubarak	24 January 1962 (aged 22)			(United Arab Emirates Football Association) Al-Wasl
8	MF	Salah Rashid Mohamed				(United Arab Emirates Football Association) Al-Alhi
9	MF	Mohamed Salim Obeid				(United Arab Emirates Football Association) Al-Wasl
10	FW	Adnan Al-Talyani	30 October 1964 (aged 20)			(United Arab Emirates Football Association) Al-Shaab CSC
11	FW	Salem Naseeb				(United Arab Emirates Football Association)
12	DF	Abdulqader Othman				(United Arab Emirates Football Association)
15	MF	Farooq Abdulrahman				(United Arab Emirates Football Association)
16	MF	Mohamed Obaid Al-Zahiri	1 August 1967 (aged 17)			(United Arab Emirates Football Association) Al Ain
18	DF	Mohamed Salim Mubarak	1 January 1968 (aged 16)			(United Arab Emirates Football Association) Al-Alhi
20	MF	Bader Ahmed Saleh				(United Arab Emirates Football Association)
22	GK	Abdulqadir Hassan	15 April 1962 (aged 22)			(United Arab Emirates Football Association) Al-Shabab
