= 2007 Sultan of Selangor Cup =

Sultan of Selangor Cup
- Event: 2007 Sultan of Selangor Cup
Selangor selection	S-League selection
Selangor FA	FA Singapore
1	3
- Date: 11 August 2007
- Venue: Shah Alam Stadium, Shah Alam, Selangor

The 2007 Sultan of Selangor Cup was played on 11 August 2007, at Shah Alam Stadium in Shah Alam, Selangor. It was held in conjunction with Malaysia's 50th independence.

== Match ==
11 August 2007
21:30 UTC+8

Selangor selection	1 - 3	(Singapore) S-League selection
Shukor Adan 47'	Report	Daniel Bennett 25'; Mirko Grabovac 62'; Farizal Basri 88'

Shah Alam Stadium, Shah Alam

== Players ==
Selangor		Singapore	
Position	Player	Position	Player
GK	Megat Amir Faisal	GK	Lionel Lewis
	Razlan Joffri	DF	Noh Rahman
	Fahrul Nizwan	DF	Precious Emuejeraye
	Nasrulwan Makmor	DF	Moudourou Moise
DF	Mohd Nasriq Baharom	MF	Daniel Bennett
DF	P. Gunalan		Zahid Ahmad
MF	Amri Yahyah	MF	Shi Jiayi
FW	Stanley Bernard Stephen Samuel	MF	Farizal Basri
MF	Shukor Adan	MF	John Wilkinson
	Fazilidin Khalid	MF	Rafi Ali
FW	Abdul Hadi Yahya	MF	Therdsak Chaiman
MF	D. Surendran	MF	Mohd Noor Ali
FW	Akmal Rizal	DF	Zulfadli Zainal Abidin
DF	Fadhil Hashim	FW	Jon Angelucci
FW	Mohd Fadzli Saari	FW	Mirko Grabovac
		FW	Noh Alam Shah
		DF	Faizal Hamid

== Veterans ==
A match between veterans of two teams are also held in the same day before the real match starts as a curtain raiser.

11 August 2007

Selangor Veterans	0 - 1	Singapore Veterans
		Abdullah Noor

Shah Alam Stadium, Shah Alam
