= 2006 Sultan of Selangor Cup =

Sultan of Selangor Cup
- Event: 2006 Sultan of Selangor Cup
S-League selection	Selangor selection
FA Singapore	Selangor FA
3	0
- Date: 10 May 2006
- Venue: Singapore National Stadium, Kallang, Singapore
- Referee: Waiyabot Anucha
- Attendance: 22,560

The 2006 Sultan of Selangor Cup was played on 10 May 2006, at Singapore National Stadium in Kallang, Singapore. This match marks the second time the competition is played in Singapore.

== Match ==
10 May 2006
21:30 UTC+8

S-League selection (Singapore)	3 - 0	Selangor selection
Mirko Grabovac 5'; Peres De Oliveira 45'; Khairul Amri 55'; Precious Emuejeraye (yellow card) 93'	Report	Kaironnisam Sahabudin Hussain (yellow card) 62'; Liew Kit Kong (yellow card) 82'

Singapore National Stadium, Kallang
Attendance: 22,560
Referee: Waiyabot Anucha

== Players ==
Singapore		Selangor	
Position	Player	Position	Player
GK	Lionel Lewis	GK	Faizal Rashid
GK	Hassan Sunny	FW	Bambang Pamungkas
DF	Noh Rahman	DF	Chan Wing Hoong
MF	Boyko Kamenov	DF	Bacheikh
MF	Isa Halim	DF	Lim Chan Yew
DF	Sead Muratovic	MF	Yusri Che Lah
FW	Mirko Grabovac	MF	Rachid Zmama
FW	Khairul Amri	FW	Brian Diego Fuentes
FW	Peres de Oliveira	MF	Newton Ben Katanha
MF	Ishak Zainol	MF	Tengku Hazman Raja Hassan
DF	Precious Emuejeraye	FW	Haris Safwan Kamal
MF	Daniel Bennett	DF	Mohd Fauzi Nan
MF	Mustafic Fahrudin	MF	K. Nanthakumar
DF	Kenji Arai	DF	Kaironnisam Sahabudin Hussain
MF	Mustaqim Manzur	FW	Juan Arostegui
MF	Shogo Yoshizawa	FW	Liew Kit Kong
FW	Sutee Suksomkit	MF	Amir Shahreen Mubin

== Veterans ==
A match between veterans of two teams are also held in the same day before the real match starts as a curtain raiser.

10 May 2006

Singapore Veterans	1 - 2	Selangor Veterans
Tay Peng Kee		Dollah Salleh

Singapore National Stadium, Kallang
Attendance: 25,000
