= 2005 Sultan of Selangor Cup =

Sultan of Selangor Cup
- Event: 2005 Sultan of Selangor Cup
Selangor selection	Singapore S-League selection
Selangor FA	FA Singapore
3	1
- Date: 22 May 2005
- Venue: Shah Alam Stadium, Shah Alam, Selangor

The 2005 Sultan of Selangor Cup was played on 22 May 2005, at Shah Alam Stadium in Shah Alam, Selangor.

== Match ==
22 May 2005
21:30 UTC+8

Selangor selection	3 - 1	Singapore S-League selection
Bambang Pamungkas 13', 33'; Md Noor Md Derus 38'		Baihakki Khaizan 18'

Shah Alam Stadium, Shah Alam, Selangor

== Players ==
Selangor		Singapore	
Position	Player	Position	Player
GK	Shahrizan Ismail	GK	Lionel Lewis
GK	Jamsari Sabian	MF	Daniel Bennett
DF	Nazrulerwan Makmor	DF	Fathi Yunos
DF	Ahmad Tharmini Saiban	DF	Razif Mahamud
DF	D. Surendran	DF	Baihakki Khaizan
MF	K. Sanbagamaran	DF	Precious Emuejeraye
MF	Nazzab Hidzan	MF	Akihiro Nakamura
MF	Muhammad Shukor Adan	MF	Ahmad Latiff Khamaruddin
MF	Elie Aiboy	FW	Khairul Amri
FW	Bambang Pamungkas	MF	Shi Jiayi
MF	Farah Badui	MF	Mark Williams
FW	Brian Diego Fuentes	FW	Jonathan Angelucci
MF	Md Noor Md Derus	FW	Qiu Li
DF	Aiman Firdaus Tan Abdullah	FW	Masrezwan Masturi
FW	Marlon Alex James	MF	Hasrin Jailani
FW	Miroslav Toth	MF	Itimi Dickson

== Veterans ==
A match between veterans of two teams are also held in the same day before the real match starts as a curtain raiser.

22 May 2005

Selangor Veterans	2 - 2	Singapore Veterans
P. Maniam 21', 45'		Fandi Ahmad 42', 9' (pen.)
Penalties
	3 - 5

Shah Alam Stadium, Shah Alam, Selangor

Veteran Players
Selangor	Singapore
Rashid Hassan	David Lee
Yap Kim Choon	Hasli Ibrahim
Soh Chin Aun	Abdullah Noor
Hanafiah Ali	Razali Saad
Kamarulzaman Yussoff	Robert Sim
John Engkatesu	Terry Pathmanathan
Abdullah Ali	Au Yeong Pak Kuan
P. Dharmalingam	R.Suriamurthi
P. Maniam	Yahya Madon
Khalid Ali	Malek Awab
Razali Alias	Lim Tang Boon
Dollah Salleh	Fandi Ahmad
Mohd Shah Norbit	Tay Peng Kee
Zainal Abidin Hassan	Quah Kim Song
Santokh Singh	T. Pathmanathan
K. Rajagopal	
K. Gunalan	
Khan Hung Meng	
Reduan Abdullah	
Gunasegaran	
E. Elavaresan	
