= 1988 Hong Kong–Shanghai Cup =

1988 Hong Kong–Shanghai Cup was the 23rd staging of Hong Kong-Shanghai Cup. Hong Kong captured the champion by winning 3-2.

== Squads ==
The following are part of the squads for both teams.

=== Hong Kong ===
- Chan Su Ming 陳樹明
- Cheung Chi Tak 張志德
- Lai Lo Kau 賴羅球
- Leung Sui Wing 梁帥榮
- Yu Kwok Sum 余國森
- Leslie Santos 山度士
- Kum Kam Fai 顧錦輝
- Sze Wai Shan 施維山
- Lai Wing Cheong 黎永昌
- Tim Bredbury 巴貝利
- Chan Fat Chi 陳發枝
- Yu Kin Tak 茹建德
- Lam Hing Lun 林慶麟

=== Shanghai ===
- Li Rao 李曉
- Zheng Yan 鄭彥
- Tang Chuansun 唐全順

== Result ==
13 March 1988

Hong Kong	3 – 2 (a.e.t.)	Shanghai
Tim Bredbury 18' 34'; Chan Fat Chi 119'	(Report) (in Chinese)	Li Rao 31'; Tang Chuansun 89'

Government Stadium, Hong Kong
