= 1984 AFC Asian Cup final =

Association football match

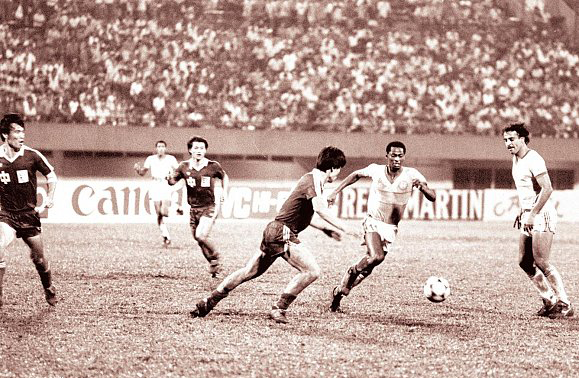
- The Final of the 1984 AFC Asian Cup, against China. Saudi Arabia won their first AFC Asian Cup in their first entry to the competition.
- Event: 1984 AFC Asian Cup
Saudi Arabia	China
(Saudi Arabia)	(China)
2	0
- Date: 16 December 1984
- Venue: National Stadium, Singapore
- Referee: Shizuo Takada (Japan)
- Attendance: 26,000

The 1984 AFC Asian Cup final was a football match which determined the winner of the 1984 AFC Asian Cup, the 8th edition of the AFC Asian Cup, a quadrennial tournament contested by the men's national teams of the member associations of the Asian Football Confederation. The match was won by Saudi Arabia, defeating China 2–0.

== Venue ==
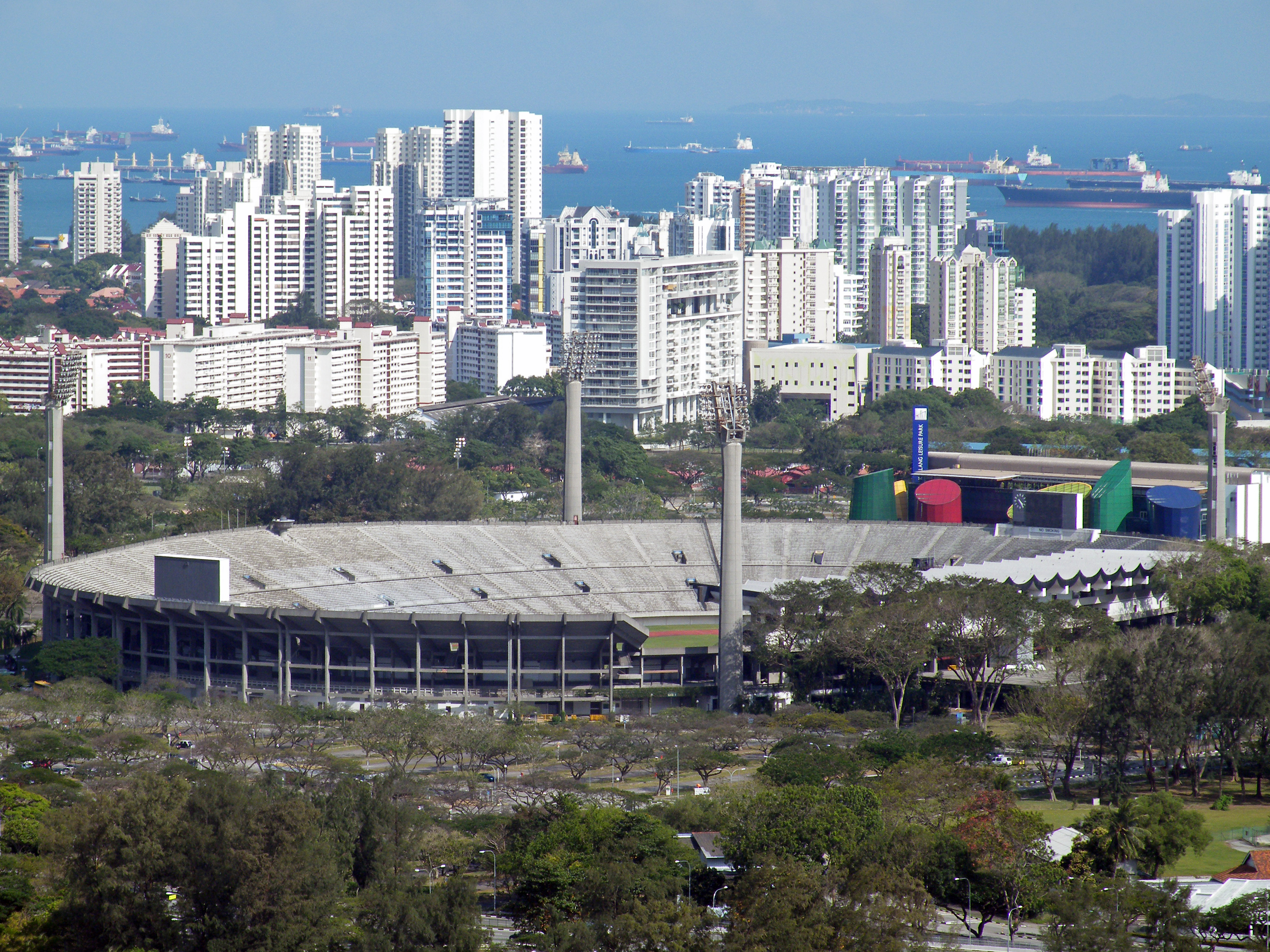
Former Singapore National Stadium hosted the final

The Former Singapore National Stadium was located in Kallang, Singapore, hosted the 1984 AFC Asian Cup final. The 55,000 Capacity Stadium opened in 1973 and closed in 2007. The stadium was demolished from 2010 to 2011 and replaced by Singapore National Stadium. It was only stadium used to host the 1984 Asian Cup; all matches were played in this stadium.

== Route to the final ==
Saudi Arabia
Round
China PR
Opponents
Result
Group stage
Opponents
Result
South Korea
1–1
Match 1
Iran
0–2
Syria
1–0
Match 2
Singapore
2–0
Qatar
1–1
Match 3
India
3–0
Kuwait
1–0
Match 4
United Arab Emirates
5–0
Group A Winners

Pos	Team	Pld	Pts
1	Saudi Arabia	4	6
2	Kuwait	4	5
3	Qatar	4	4
4	Syria	4	3
5	South Korea	4	2

Final standings
Group B winners

Pos	Team	Pld	Pts
1	China	4	6
2	Iran	4	6
3	United Arab Emirates	4	4
4	Singapore	4	3
5	India	4	1

Opponents
Result
Knockout stage
Opponents
Result
Iran
1–1 (a.e.t.) (5–4 pen.)
Semi-finals
Kuwait
1–0 (a.e.t.)

== Match ==
=== Details ===
16 December 1984
20:00

Saudi Arabia	2–0	China
Al-Nafisah 10'; Abdullah 46'

National Stadium, Singapore
Attendance: 26,000
Referee: Shizuo Takada (Japan)

Saudi Arabia
China

GK	1	Abdullah Al-Deayea
DF	2	Nasser Al-Meaweed	(yellow card) 38'
DF	3	Hussein Al-Bishi
DF	5	Saleh Al-Nu'eimeh
DF	13	Mohamed Abd Al-Jawad
MF	6	Yahya Amer	(yellow card) 57'
MF	10	Fahad Al-Musaibeah
MF	14	Saleh Khalifa Al-Dosari
FW	7	Shaye Al-Nafisah
FW	9	Majed Abdullah		(substituted off) 46'
FW	17	Mohaisen Al-Jam'an
Substitutes:
FW	17	Bandar Al-Nakhli		(substituted on) 46'
Manager:
Khalil Al-Zayani

GK	1	Lu Jianren
DF	2	Zhu Bo
DF	3	Lin Lefeng
DF	5	Jia Xiuquan
DF	12	Chi Minghua
CM	6	Lin Qiang	(substituted off) 63'
CM	17	Yang Zhaohui
CM	7	Gu Guangming	(substituted off) 46'
FW	8	Zhao Dayu
FW	9	Zuo Shusheng
FW	10	Li Hui
Substitutes:
FW	11	Li Huayun	(substituted on) 46'
MF	14	Wu Yuhua	(substituted on) 63'
Manager:
Zeng Xuelin

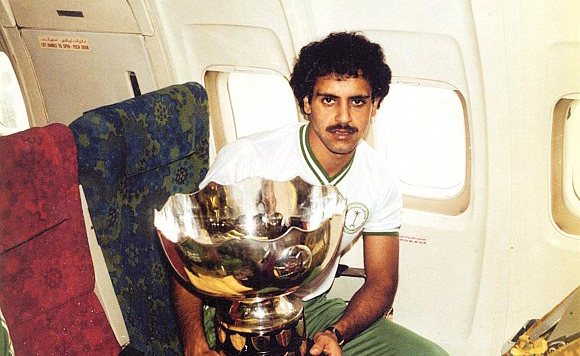
Shaye Al-Nafisah, holding the 1984 Asian Cup title
