= 2001 Sultan of Selangor Cup =

Sultan of Selangor Cup
- Event: 2001 Sultan of Selangor Cup
Selangor Selection	S-League Selection
Selangor FA	FA Singapore
0	0
- Penalty 4 - 2
- Date: 4 August 2001
- Venue: Shah Alam Stadium, Shah Alam, Selangor

The 2001 Sultan of Selangor Cup (The Regent of Selangor's Cup) was played on 4 August 2001, at Shah Alam Stadium in Shah Alam, Selangor.

== Match ==
4 August 2001

Selangor Selection	0 - 0	(Singapore) S-League Selection
Penalties
Merzagua Abderrazak (penalty scored); B. Rajinikandh (penalty scored); Rizal Hassan (penalty scored); Amri Yahyah (penalty scored)	4 - 2	(penalty missed) Ballamodou Conde; (penalty missed) Sead Muratovic; (penalty scored) Zahid Hamid; (penalty scored) Tan Kim Leng

Shah Alam Stadium, Shah Alam, Selangor

== Players ==
Selangor		Singapore	
Position	Player	Position	Player
GK	Hadi Tahir	GK	Rezal Hassan
GK	Azmin Azram Aziz	GK	Shahri Rahim
DF	Khairil Zainal	DF	Abdul Latiff Isa
DF	B. Rajinikandh	DF	Iskandar Latiff
DF	Shamsul Amri Abu Bakar	DF	Sead Muratović
DF	Bahtiar Othman	DF	Jaslee Hatta
DF	Lim Chan Yew	DF	Razif Mahamud
DF	Kamarulzaman Yub Majid	MF	Aidil Sulaiman
MF	Rizal Hassan	MF	Johari Husin
MF	Asmawi Bakiri	MF	Hiroyuki Ishida
MF	Yusri Che Lah	MF	Ballamodou Conde
MF	Khairun Haled Masrom	MF	Brain Ravi
MF	Tengku Hazman Hassan	MF	Nazri Nasir
MF	Rauf Ahmad	MF	Hafizat Jauharmi
FW	Rusdi Suparman	FW	Michiaki Kakimoto
FW	Amri Yahyah	FW	Kiatisuk Senamuang
FW	Merzagua Abderrazak	FW	Mirko Grabovac
		FW	Fandi Ahmad

Match rules

- 90 minutes.
- Penalty shoot-out if scores still level.
- Seven named substitutes.
- Maximum of three substitutions.

== Veterans ==
A match between veterans of two teams are also held in the same day before the real match starts as a curtain raiser.

4 August 2001

Selangor Veterans	2 - 2	Singapore Veterans
Soh Chin Aun 11'; Zainal Abidin Hassan 47'		Tay Feng Kee 48'; T. Pathmanathan 39'
Penalties
	4 - 2

Shah Alam Stadium, Shah Alam, Selangor
