= 2004 Sultan of Selangor Cup =

Sultan of Selangor Cup
- Event: 2004 Sultan of Selangor Cup
S-League All Stars	MPPJ F.C.
FA Singapore	Selangor FA
2	2
- Both teams announced as joint winners
- Date: 16 May 2004
- Venue: Singapore National Stadium, Kallang, Singapore

The 2004 Sultan of Selangor Cup was played on 16 May 2004, at Singapore National Stadium in Kallang, Singapore.

== Match ==
16 May 2004

S-League All Stars (Singapore)	2 - 2	(Selangor) MPPJ F.C.
Shahril Ishak 15'; Agu Casmir 35'	Report	Juan Arostegui 50'; Fabricio Rene Francesni 55'

Singapore National Stadium, Kallang, Singapore
Attendance: 40,000

== Players ==
Singapore		Selangor	
Position	Player	Position	Player
GK	Rezal Hassan	GK	Jamsari Sabian
DF	Baihakki Khaizan	MF	Faizal Zainal
DF	Zulkarnaen Zainal	DF	Abdul Rauf Ahmad
DF	Sead Muratovic	MF	Fabricio Rene Francesni
MF	Ahmad Latiff Khamaruddin	MF	Shahril Arsat
FW	Shahril Ishak	FW	Anuar Abu Bakar
MF	Shi Jiayi	DF	Aiman Firdaus Tan Abdullah
DF	Boubacar Keita	FW	Juan Arostegui
MF	Daniel Bennet	MF	Bruno Martelotto
FW	Ashrin Shariff	MF	Azrin Shah Zainal
FW	Masrezwan Masturi	DF	Kamarulzaman Yub Majid
FW	Noh Alam Shah	FW	Khairil Zainal
MF	Itimi Dickson	FW	Sasa Branezac
MF	Hidetoshi Wakui	FW	Mohd Nizaruddin Yusof
MF	Ridhuan Muhammad	DF	Yuzaiman Zahari
FW	Agu Casmir		Mohd Zaidi Zaing

== Veterans ==
A match between veterans of two teams are also held in the same day before the real match starts as a curtain raiser.

16 May 2004

Singapore Veterans	3 - 3	Selangor Veterans
S. Rajagopal 1'; Fandi Ahmad 9'; Quah Kim Song 50'		Soh Chin Aun 5', 20'; K. Rajagopal 43' (pen.)
Penalties
	3 - 5

Singapore National Stadium, Kallang, Singapore
