= Shahril Jantan =

Singaporean footballer (born 1980)

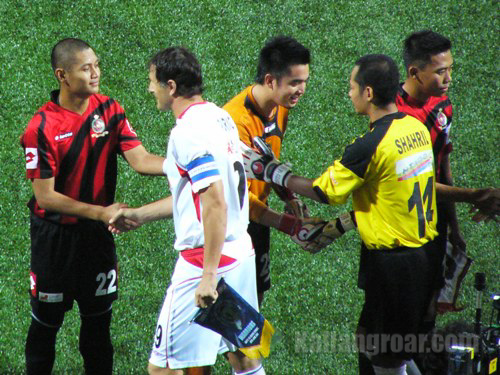
- Shahril with SAFFC during the 2009 Singapore Cup Final.

Personal information
- Full name: Shahril Jantan
- Date of birth: 20 April 1980 (age 46)
- Place of birth: Singapore
- Height: 1.82 m (5 ft 11 1/2 in)
- Position: Goalkeeper

Senior career*
Years	Team	Apps	(Gls)
1999–2001	Geylang United	13	(0)
2002–2003	SAFFC	45	(0)
2004–2005	Geylang United	52	(0)
2006–2012	SAFFC	184	(0)
2013–2015	Home United	65	(0)
Total		359	(0)

International career
2002–2005	Singapore	8	(0)

Managerial career
- 2019–2020: Geylang International (goalkeeper coach)
- * Club domestic league appearances and goals

Shahril Jantan (born 20 April 1980) is a Singaporean retired footballer who last played as a goalkeeper for S.League clubs with Geylang United, SAFFC and Home United. He is currently the Goalkeeper Coach for Young Lions B and National Team U17-U19.

== Club career ==
=== Geylang United ===
Shahril began his football career at age 16 with Geylang United's under-16 team, progressing to the under-18 squad in 1997 and the Prime League side in 1998. That same year, he was registered for the senior S.League squad as the third-choice goalkeeper behind David Lee and Shahri Rahim. He retained that role in 1999 before becoming the club's backup goalkeeper in 2000, serving as understudy to German goalkeeper Lutz Pfannenstiel. In Shahril 1st full season in the 2001 S.League, he won his first S.League title medal with Geylang United after a mixed season, sharing playing time with Lionel Lewis.

==== Training Stint at Arsenal ====
In November 2000, Shahril and Lionel Lewis were sent to English Premier League club Arsenal in London for a five-week training attachment. During the stint, they trained alongside Arsenal's reserve and youth squad players, including Ashley Cole, Matthew Upson, David Bentley, and Jermaine Pennant.

=== SAFFC ===
In 2002, Shahril moved to SAFFC as he was serving his National Service, a year where Shahril played 1 of his best season helping SAFFC winning the 2002 S.League, his second winners medal two years running. The same year, Shahril edged out long-time custodian goalkeeper, Rezal Hassan, taking the national number one jersey.

Shahril was nominated for the Young Player of The Year award but lost to Noh Alam Shah. He was also named Straits Times Goalkeeper of the Year award for 2002 season.

=== Return to Geylang United ===
Shahril returned to Geylang United for the 2004 and 2005 season to finish the remainder of his contract where he had a disappointing season before moving to back to SAFFC in 2006.

=== Return to SAFFC ===
Shahril helped SAFFC to win the 2006, 2007, 2008 and recently the 2009 S-League Championship and the 2007, 2008, 2012 Singapore Cup, his 6th S-League winners medal in 9 full season as a professional. He recently won another Singapore Cup Trophy with his current club Home United Football Club .

Shahril was named the Warriors' Player of the Year for 2009 season.

=== Home United ===
In 2013, Shahril joined Home United on a two-years contract before deciding to retire at the end of the 2015 season.

== International career ==
In 1998, Shahril got his first national team call-up as an 18-year-old, against Brunei. With injuries to first choice keeper Rezal Hassan and the unavailability of others, Shahril got his chance, thanks to then Head Coach Vincent Subramaniam.

His full international debut came against Uruguay on 21 May 2002.

The 2002 Tiger Cup would prove a disappointing end to what should have been a memorable year for Shahril, and the young keeper bore the brunt of much criticism. His last National team call-up was after being in the Singapore Squad that won the now defunct 2004 Tiger Cup.

== Coaching career ==
=== Youth ===
In January 2016, Shahril joined Tampines Rovers as the club goalkeeper Coach for the U15 & U17 team.

=== Geylang International ===
In January 2019, Shahril joined Geylang International as the club goalkeeper Coach for the first team playing in the 2019 Singapore Premier League on a year contract until February 2020.

=== Lion City Sailors ===
In July 2020, Shahril joined the newly privatised Lion City Sailors as an academy goalkeeper coach, before being promoted to Head of Foundation in July 2022. In January 2025, he was promoted to Head of Goalkeeping and Under-21 Goalkeeper Coach at the Lion City Sailors Football Academy, overseeing goalkeeper development from the foundation phase through to the under-21 squad.

=== Singapore National Team (U17-U19) ===
At international level, Shahril was appointed goalkeeper coach for the Singapore national under-16 team in June 2025, featuring in the Lion City Cup, the ASEAN U-16 Boys' Championship, and the AFC U-17 Asian Cup qualifiers. He also served as goalkeeper coach for the national under-19 team during the AFC U-20 Asian Cup qualifiers in Bhutan, and later rejoined the under-16 squad for the AFC U-17 Asian Cup qualifiers in Malaysia.

=== Young Lions B ===
Shahril was appointed as the goalkeeper coach for the Young Lions B in June 2026.

== Personal life ==
While still playing professional football, Shahril earned a bachelor's degree in sports management from the University of Wolverhampton in 2013. Following his retirement at the end of the 2015 S.League season, he worked as an assistant project manager at Red Card Global. In July 2016, Shahril transitioned into the social service sector as a programme executive at Students Care Services (now known as SHINE Children and Youth Services). He rose to the role of senior social work associate before leaving the sector in July 2021 to join the Lion City Sailors Football Academy full-time.

Shahril is known as an active Mountain Biker.

== Honours ==
=== Club ===
==== Geylang United ====
- S.League: 2001

==== SAFFC ====
- S.League: 2002, 2006, 2007, 2008, 2009
- Singapore Cup: 2007, 2008, 2012

==== Home United ====
- Singapore Cup: 2013

=== International ===
==== Singapore ====
- ASEAN Football Championship: 2004

=== Individual ===
- Straits Times Goalkeeper of the Year: 2002
- SAFFC-Warriors' Player of the Year: 2009
- Yeo's People's Choice Award: 2010
