= 2009 Selangor FA season =

Selangor FA
2009 season
- Chairman: Khalid Ibrahim
- Manager: K devan
- Stadium: Shah Alam Stadium
- 2009 Malaysia Super League: 1st
- 2009 Malaysia FA Cup: Champions
- 2009 Malaysia Cup: Quarter-finals
- –
- Top goalscorer: League: Mohd Amri Yahyah (13); All: Mohd Amri Yahyah (13); R. Surendran (13)

The 2009 Selangor FA Season is Selangor FA's 4th season playing soccer in the Malaysia Super League Since its inception in 2004.

Selangor FA began the season on 10 January 2009. They will also compete in two domestic cups; The FA Cup Malaysia and Malaysia Cup.

== Malaysia Super League ==
Pos	Team	Pld	W	D	L	GF	GA	GD	Pts	Qualification or relegation
1	Selangor (C)	26	20	3	3	64	21	+43	63	Champion / Qualification to AFC Cup
2	Perlis	26	17	5	4	40	19	+21	56	
3	Kedah	26	16	3	7	45	28	+17	51	
4	Johor FC	26	15	3	8	53	27	+26	48	
5	Terengganu	26	15	2	9	46	29	+17	47	

Source: Results TM Liga Super and Rec.Sport.Soccer Statistics Foundation
(C) Champions

== Malaysia FA Cup ==
=== First round ===
Selangor had a first round bye.

=== Second round ===
The first leg match played on 21 February 2009. The second leg will be play on 24 February 2009.

Team 1	Agg.	Team 2	1st leg	2nd leg
Kuala Lumpur FA	1–2	Selangor FA	0–1	1–1

=== Quarter-final ===
The quarter final matches are scheduled to be played on 3 March and the weekend of 7 March 2009.

==== First leg ====
3 March 2009
20:45

Perak	1–2	Selangor
Razali Umar 74'		Safee 30' (pen.); Amri 53'

Stadium Perak, Ipoh

==== Second leg ====
7 March 2009
20:45

Selangor	2–0	Perak

Shah Alam Stadium, Shah Alam
- Selangor advance 4–1 on aggregate

=== Semi-final ===
The first leg matches were played on Tuesday, 7 April 2009, while the second legs were played on Tuesday, 18 April 2009.

==== First leg ====
7 April 2009
20:45

Perlis FA	1–1	Selangor FA
Syazwan 2'		Premnath 34'

Utama Stadium, Kangar

==== Second leg ====
18 April 2009
20:45

Selangor FA	2–1	Perlis FA
Amri 15' 90'		Azi 17'

Shah Alam Stadium, Shah Alam
Attendance: 35,000
- Selangor FA advance 3–2 on aggregate

=== Final ===
The final was played at National Stadium, Bukit Jalil, Kuala Lumpur, on Saturday, 25 April 2009.

25 April 2009
20:45

Kelantan FA	1–1 (a.e.t.)	Selangor FA
Norfarhan 93'	Report	Amri 101'
Penalties
(penalty missed) Indra; (penalty scored) Ezrie; (penalty missed) Zairol	1–4	Khairul (penalty scored); Nasriq (penalty scored); Surendran (penalty scored); Safee (penalty scored)

National Stadium, Bukit Jalil, Kuala Lumpur
Attendance: 92,000
Referee: (Malaysia) Subkhiddin Mohd Salleh
- Selangor FA win 4–1 on penalties

== Malaysia Cup ==
=== Group stage ===
==== Group D ====
Pos	Team	Pld	W	D	L	GF	GA	GD	Pts
1	Selangor (Q)	6	4	1	1	15	8	+7	13
2	Kuala Muda Naza FC (Q)	6	4	0	2	13	8	+5	12
3	PDRM	6	1	2	3	5	12	−7	5
4	Sabah FA	6	1	1	4	7	12	−5	4

(Q) Qualified to quarterfinals

=== Knockout stage ===
==== Bracket ====
Quarterfinals
A1	KL Plus	1	0	1
E1	Kelantan	1	3	4
C1	Johor FC	1	0	1
A2	Perlis	2	2	4
B1	Negeri Sembilan	2	3	3
D2	Sabah FA	0	2	2
D1	Selangor	1	1	2 (4)
B2	Terengganu	1	1	2 (5)

Semifinals
Kelantan	2	3	5
Perlis	0	1	1
Negeri Sembilan	1	3	4
Terengganu	0	1	1

Final
Kelantan	1
Negeri Sembilan	3
