= 2003 Sultan of Selangor Cup =

Sultan of Selangor Cup
- Event: 2003 Sultan of Selangor Cup
Selangor Selection	S-League All Stars
Selangor FA	FA Singapore
4	1
- Date: 29 March 2003
- Venue: Shah Alam Stadium, Shah Alam, Selangor

The 2003 Sultan of Selangor Cup was played on 29 March 2003, at Shah Alam Stadium in Shah Alam, Selangor.

== Match ==
29 March 2003

Selangor Selection	4 - 1	(Singapore) S-League All-Stars
Mohd Nizaruddin Yusof 2', 23'; Juan Arostegui 57'; Rudie Ramli 90'		Dalis Supait 11'

Shah Alam Stadium, Shah Alam, Selangor

== Veterans ==
A match between veterans of two teams are also held in the same day before the real match starts as a curtain raiser.

29 March 2003

Selangor Veterans	1 - 0	Singapore Veterans
Zainal Abidin Hassan 2'

Shah Alam Stadium, Shah Alam, Selangor
