= 1985 China v Hong Kong football match =

19 May Incident 五一九事件
- Event: 1986 FIFA World Cup qualification – AFC first round
China PR	Hong Kong
(China)	(Hong Kong)
1	2
- Hong Kong qualifies for the final round of qualification.
- Date: 19 May 1985
- Venue: Workers' Stadium, Beijing
- Referee: Melvyn D'Souza (India)
- Attendance: 80,000

China v Hong Kong was a 1986 FIFA World Cup qualification match played on 19 May 1985, noteworthy in that the surprise result caused deep dissatisfaction and hooliganism among Mainland Chinese football fans, leading to the match being immortalised as the 19 May Incident or 5.19 incident (Chinese: 五一九事件).

Needing a victory to advance, Hong Kong achieved a stunning 2–1 win to eliminate heavily-favoured China, with goals from Cheung Chi Tak in the 19th minute and Ku Kam Fai in the 60th minute. Indian referee Melvyn D'Souza officiated the match, which was described by commentators at the time as being played in an unusually intense (for an Asian World Cup qualifier) manner. After the loss, disgruntled home fans rioted in the Workers' Stadium and the People's Armed Police were needed to restore order. Due to the high stakes, the match was one of the most notable in the rivalry between the China and Hong Kong national football teams.

== Background ==
China were the runners-up of the 1984 AFC Asian Cup and expected to be by far the strongest team in its 1986 FIFA World Cup qualification AFC Zone B first round group.

China and Hong Kong had met earlier in the tournament, playing out a scoreless draw in Hong Kong.

They entered the final match tied on points; however, China held the advantage in goal differential due to larger margins of victory over the group's other two teams, Brunei and Macau.

Thus, in order to advance to the next round, Hong Kong would need an unlikely away win in the Chinese capital.

=== Table before the match ===
After 12 May 1985, the group 4A table was as follows:

Legend
Cannot qualify

#	Team	Pld	W	D	L	GF	GA	GD	Pts
1	China	5	4	1	0	22	0	+22	9
2	Hong Kong	5	4	1	0	17	1	+16	9
3	Macau	6	2	0	4	4	15	−11	4
4	Brunei	6	0	0	6	2	29	−27	0

China qualifies for second round with win or draw.

Hong Kong qualifies for second round with win only.

== Match ==
=== Summary ===
The Chinese team began the game on the offensive, determined to achieve a win rather than a draw. However, Hong Kong scored the first goal in the 19th minute, when during a free kick, Wu Kwok Hung backheeled the ball to Cheung Chi Tak, who shot and scored from well outside the penalty area.

China equalized twelve minutes later, when Li Hui scored off a rebound from Hong Kong's goalkeeper. In the second half, the Chinese players went on the attack again, and in doing so allowed more chances for Hong Kong to score. This culminated in Hong Kong's second goal, when Ku Kam Fai scored at the 60 minute mark. China took several shots over the game's final half-hour but were unable to score, resulting in a 2–1 victory for Hong Kong.

=== Details ===
19 May 1985
20:00 CST UTC+8

China	1–2	Hong Kong
Li Hui 31'		Cheung Chi Tak 19'; Ku Kam Fai 60'

Workers' Stadium, Beijing
Attendance: 80,000
Referee: Melvyn D'Souza (India)

China PR	Hong Kong

GK		Lu Jianren
RB		Zhu Bo
CB		Jia Xiuquan
CB		Lin Lefeng
LB		Lü Hongxiang
CM		Lin Qiang
CM		Yang Zhaohui
CM		Wang Huiliang		(substituted off) 70'
RF	7	Gu Guangming
CF	10	Li Hui	(yellow card) 64'
LF		Zuo Shusheng (c)		(substituted off) 38'
Substitutions:
FW		Li Huayun		(substituted on) 38'
FW		Zhao Dayu		(substituted on) 70'
Manager:
Zeng Xuelin

GK		Chan Wan Ngok
SW	2	Leung Sui Wing (c)
CB		Lai Law Kau
CB	19	Ku Kam Fai
RWB	14	Cheung Chi Tak
LWB		Yu Kwok Sum	(yellow card) 21'
RM		Lau Wing Yip
CM		Wong Kwok On
CM	13	Wu Kwok Hung
LM		Chan Fat Chi		(substituted off) 73'
CF		Wan Chi Keung		(substituted off) 85'
Substitutions:
DF		Tam Yu Wah		(substituted on) 73'
DF		Philip Reis		(substituted on) 85'
Manager:
Kwok Ka Ming

== Aftermath ==
=== Result ===
Legend
Qualified directly for the next round

#	Team	Pts	Pld	W	D	L	GF	GA	GD
1	Hong Kong	11	6	5	1	0	19	2	+17
2	China	9	6	4	1	1	23	2	+21
3	Macau	4	6	2	0	4	4	15	−11
4	Brunei	0	6	0	0	6	2	29	−27

Hong Kong advances to Zone B Second Round.

In the AFC Zone B Second Round (AFC semi-finals), Hong Kong faced another heavy favorite in a two-legged matchup with Japan. They quickly allowed two goals in the first leg in Japan, eventually falling 3–0.

They performed better in the second leg at home, but missed a penalty and lost 2–1. Japan advanced to the Zone B Final Round, 5–1 on aggregate score.

11 August 1985	Japan	3–0	Hong Kong	Kobe, Japan
	Hara 9' (pen.); Kimura 11'; Mizunuma 53'			Referee: Gurkan (Philippines)

22 September 1985	Hong Kong	1–2	Japan	Hong Kong
	Wan Chi Keung 80'		Kimura 45'; Hara 89'	Referee: Lee Kok Leong (Singapore)

For China, the result represented another frustrating setback in their quest to qualify for their first World Cup finals.

In the qualifying tournament for the 1982 edition, they had lost to New Zealand by the same score in a winner-take-all match to qualify for the World Cup Finals. It would not be until 2002 that China would finally qualify for their first FIFA World Cup.

=== Hooliganism incident ===
This match also led to "the first incident of football hooliganism in the history of the People's Republic of China".

While Hong Kong's team received a hero's welcome upon their return, disgruntled mainlanders rioted in and around Workers' Stadium after the match. The People's Armed Police were called to restore order, leading to 127 arrests.

Zeng Xuelin, manager of the Chinese national team, and Li Fenglou, chairman of the Chinese Football Association, both resigned.
