= Subang Football League =

Malaysia regional level football league

- Founded: 2018; 8 years ago
- Country: Malaysia
- Confederation: AFC
- Number of clubs: 10
- Level on pyramid: 4
- Promotion to: Malaysia A2 Amateur League
- Domestic cup: Malaysia FA Cup

Subang Football League is a state-level football league held in Subang, Selangor, Malaysia. The League is at level 4 of the Malaysian football league system. The league is managed by the Football Association of Selangor (FAS).

== History ==
Starting from 2018, clubs had promotion to the fourth-tier league called Malaysia M4 League. Langkawi Glory United become the first team to get promoted.

== Champions ==
=== League ===
- 2018: Langkawi Glory United
- 2019: MPKJ FC

=== SFL Cup ===
- 2019: MPKJ FC
