= Philip Reis =

Philip Reis may refer to:

- Philip Reis (footballer), Hong Kong international footballer in 19 May incident
- Johann Philipp Reis, also known as Philip Reis, German scientist and inventor
