= Lu Jianren =

Chinese footballer and coach

Lu Jianren 路建人
Personal information
- Full name: Lu Jianren
- Date of birth: 14 January 1959 (age 67)
- Place of birth: Beijing, China
- Height: 1.80 m (5 ft 11 in)
- Position: Goalkeeper

Senior career*
Years	Team	Apps	(Gls)
1979–1987	Beijing team		

International career
1984–1986	China	13	(0)

Managerial career
- 1997: Shenzhen Ping'an
- 1999–2000: Guangzhou Songri
- 2009: Shenzhen Asia Travel (assistant)
Medal record
Representing China
Men's football
AFC Asian Cup
Silver medal – second place	1984 Singapore	Team
- * Club domestic league appearances and goals

Lu Jianren (Chinese: 路建人; Chinese: 路建人; pinyin: Lù Jiànrén) is a Chinese football coach and a former international goalkeeper who played for Beijing team and China in the 1984 Asian Cup.

== Playing career ==
Lu Jianren played for his local football club Beijing FC's youth team before gaining promotion to the senior team in the 1979 league season. At Beijing, he was part of the team that won the 1982 league title, which led to him receiving a call-up to the Chinese national team. He then played understudy to Yang Ning as China's second choice goalkeeper in the 1984 AFC Asian Cup, however as the tournament progressed the manager Zeng Xuelin, who Lu previously worked with at Beijing, decided to promote him to the team's first choice goalkeeper halfway through the campaign. The move worked and China reached the final, however China lost to Saudi Arabia 2-0 and finished runners-up. Despite the defeat Lu was China's first choice goalkeeper until 19 May 1985 when during the 19 May incident saw China play a vital FIFA World Cup qualifier against Hong Kong at home and while China were overwhelming favourites they lost 2–1, which was met with intense rioting by the Chinese fans and effectively ended Lu's international career soon afterwards.

== Career statistics ==
=== International statistics ===
Competition	Year	Apps	Goal
Friendly	1984-1986	3	0
Asian Cup	1984	4	0
World Cup Qualifier	1985	6	0
Total		13	0

== Honours ==
=== Player ===
Beijing FC

- Chinese Jia-A League: 1982
