= Yu Kwok Sum =

Footballer

Sammy Yu Kwok Sum (Chinese: 余國森; Jyutping: jyu^{4} gwok^{3} sam^{1}; born 1954 in Hong Kong) is a retired professional footballer for Bulova SA, South China and Hong Kong national football team. He was a member of the Hong Kong team for the 19 May incident.

== Career ==
Yu Kwok Sum played as left back. His emergence at Yuen Long allowed teammate Chan Fat Chi to move to his favourite defensive midfield position. When Bulova was formed in the early eighties, both Yu and Chan moved to the new club. He won two doubles of Hong Kong FA Cup and Hong Kong Viceroy Cup with Bulova in the 1981-82 and 1982-83 seasons.

At the end of the 1984 season, Bulova decided to pull out. Yu and Chan Fat Chi met the owners of Seiko and South China at a restaurant on Prince Edward Road to discuss their future, Chan decided to join Wu Kwok Hung at Seiko while Yu joined South China.

Yu has played for Sing Tao, Yuen Long, Eastern, Bulova, South China, Lai Sun and Kuitan.

== Post-playing career ==
Yu now operates a marble business. He had expected to retire after playing for Lai Sun, but when his company bid for Kuitan's marble contract, Kuitan's owner asked him to play and teach football at his club in return for granting him their business. He agreed, then played and taught at Kuitan for two years. He has since started his own marble business and mainly work with Sun Hung Kai Properties.

== Personal life ==
Yu earned HK$20,000 plus per month at Bulova FC, later his salary rose to HK$35,000. He used his salary to buy a flat at City One in Shatin. He paid if off in just a few years. He currently resides in Cheung Sha Wan. Yu married at the age of 24 and has two sons.

== Honours ==
Bulova SA

- Hong Kong FA Cup: 1981-82, 1982-83.
- Hong Kong Viceroy Cup: 1981-82, 1982-83
