= Wang Dongning =

Chinese footballer

Wang Dongning 王东宁
Personal information
- Date of birth: April 13, 1961 (age 65)
- Place of birth: Weihai, Shandong, China
- Height: 1.82 m (6 ft 0 in)
- Positions: Defender; midfielder

Youth career
- 1976–1981: Shandong team

Senior career*
Years	Team	Apps	(Gls)
1982–1993	Shandong team		
1993	Happy Valley		
1994	Shandong Taishan		
1995	Shenzhen FC		
1996	Shanghai Yuyuan		
1997–1998	Qingdao Hainiu		

International career^{‡}
1984–1994	China	8	(0)
Medal record
Men's football
Representing China
AFC Asian Cup
Silver medal – second place	1984 Singapore	Team
Asian Games
Silver medal – second place	1994 Hiroshima	Football
University Games
Bronze medal – third place	1985 Kobe	Football
- * Club domestic league appearances and goals as of January 1, 2012 ‡ National team caps and goals as of January 1, 2012

Wang Dongning (simplified Chinese: 王东宁; traditional Chinese: 王東寧; pinyin: Wáng Dōngníng; born April 13, 1961) is a former Chinese international footballer who represented Shandong team where he played as a defender or midfielder before having short stints at Happy Valley, Shenzhen FC and Qingdao Hainiu. While internationally he represented China in the 1984 Asian Cup and the 1994 Asian Games where he aided the team to a runners-up spot.

== Playing career ==
Wang Dongning started his football career with the Shandong youth team before graduating into their senior team in 1982 where he helped guide the club to a runners-up spot at the end of the league season. He was soon called up to the Chinese national team and was part of the squad that took part in the 1984 Asian Cup where China were beaten in the final to Saudi Arabia. For the next several years he was a loyal player to Shandong, however he was part of the team that saw successive relegation hit the team in 1989 and the 1990 league seasons. Despite this Wang stayed to help the club win promotion back into the second tier before he decided to leave the club and join Hong Kong First Division League team Happy Valley. His stay in Hong Kong was brief and Wang moved back to his old club Shandong in 1994 after they had renamed themselves Shandong Taishan and had returned to the top tier to become a fully professional team. With his return he was also able to gain his way back into the national team and was part of the team that went to the Football at the 1994 Asian Games and helped guide China to a runners-up spot to Uzbekistan. Nearing the end of his career Wang joined second-tier football club Shenzhen FC 1995 for a season, where he actually won the division title with them before leaving to join another second-tier club in Shanghai Yuyuan before ending his career with Qingdao Hainiu.

== Career statistics ==
=== International ===
Year	Competition	Apps	Goal
1985	Friendly	3	0
1994	Asian Games	5	0
Total		8	0

== Honours ==
Shandong team

- Chinese Jia-C League: 1991

Shenzhen FC

- Chinese Jia-B League: 1995
