= Bank Melli F.C. =

Iranian football club

Bank Melli
- Full name: Bank Melli Football Club
- Founded: 1948
- Dissolved: Mid 2000s
- Ground: Bank Melli Stadium, South Tehran; Bank Melli Club, Ajudanieh
Home colours

Bank Melli F.C. (Persian: باشگاه فوتبال بانک ملی) was an Iranian football club based in Tehran as the Sports subordinate of Bank Melli Iran. The club was famous for having one of the best youth academy's in Iran. The club was dissolved in the mid-2000s.

== Managers ==
- (Iran) Rajab Faramarzi
- (Iran) Nayeb Ruiendel
- (Iran) Rahim Mirakhori
- (Iran) Ali Doustimehr
