= 2019 Subang Football League =

Subang Football League
- Season: 2019
- Champions: MPKJ FC
- Matches: 45
- Goals: 168 (3.73 per match)
- Top goalscorer: Ayaikhaire Daniel (11 goals)

The 2019 Subang League was the second season of the Subang Football League, the fourth-tier football league in Malaysia competition featuring semi-professional and amateur clubs. It is a part of Malaysia M4 League. The season started on 6 July 2019.

== Teams ==
A total of 10 teams competed in the league. The Subang Football League was played from July to September, in single round-robin format.

== League table ==
| Pos | Team | Pld | W | D | L | GF | GA | GD | Pts | Qualification or relegation |
|---|---|---|---|---|---|---|---|---|---|---|
| 1 | MPKJ (C, Q) | 9 | 7 | 2 | 0 | 33 | 5 | +28 | 23 | Qualification for Selangor Champion League |
| 2 | KRU II | 9 | 6 | 2 | 1 | 28 | 5 | +23 | 20 | |
| 3 | Palitus (Q) | 9 | 6 | 1 | 2 | 23 | 10 | +13 | 19 | Qualification for M3 League play-offs |
| 4 | X-Star | 9 | 5 | 0 | 4 | 15 | 10 | +5 | 15 | |
| 5 | KXSLiquid USTT | 9 | 4 | 2 | 3 | 11 | 9 | +2 | 14 | |
| 6 | PJH FC | 9 | 3 | 3 | 3 | 14 | 14 | 0 | 12 | |
| 7 | Ingress United | 9 | 3 | 2 | 4 | 15 | 9 | +6 | 11 | |
| 8 | KL Cityboys | 9 | 2 | 1 | 6 | 13 | 24 | −11 | 7 | |
| 9 | Level Up Gators | 9 | 2 | 1 | 6 | 12 | 24 | −12 | 7 | |
| 10 | Wild Bear | 9 | 0 | 0 | 9 | 4 | 59 | −55 | 0 | |

Source: SFL
Rules for classification: 1) Points; 2) Goal difference; 3) Number of goals scored.
(C) Champions; (Q) Qualified for the phase indicated

== Season statistics ==
=== Top scorers ===
As of matches played on 15 September 2019.

Players sorted first by goals, then by last name.

| Rank | Player | Club | Goals |
|---|---|---|---|
| 1 | (Nigeria) Ayaikhaire Daniel | MPKJ | 11 |
| 2 | (Malaysia) Syazwan Nordin | Ingress United | 7 |
| 3 | (Malaysia) Mohamad Shahril | Palitus | 6 |
| 4 | (Malaysia) Mohammad Rijal Fikry | MPKJ | 5 |
| 4 | (Malaysia) Darshen Ganesan | MPKJ | 5 |
| 4 | (Malaysia) Ashraff Ashar | KRU II | 5 |
| 4 | (Malaysia) Syafiq Zahari | KL Cityboys | 5 |
