= Faizal Hamid =

Singaporean footballer

Personal information
- Full name: Faizal Hamid
- Date of birth: September 8, 1981 (age 45)
- Place of birth: Singapore
- Height: 1.75 m (5 ft 9 in)
- Position: Defender

Team information
- Current team: Gombak United FC
- Number: 2

Senior career*
Years	Team	Apps	(Gls)
2000–2005	Geylang United FC	12	(2)
2006	Home United FC	3	(0)
2007	SAFFC	15	(0)
2008–	Gombak United FC	19	(1)

International career^{‡}
2004–	Singapore	7	(0)
- * Club domestic league appearances and goals as of January 1, 2008 ‡ National team caps and goals as of January 1, 2008

Faizal Hamid is a Singaporean footballer, born on September 9, 1981, and plays for current S-League club, Gombak United and also the Singapore national football team as a defender. He usually plays at right-back

Faizal came from a football powerhouse in the secondary school set-up, Siglap Secondary School. He then started his footballing career with Geylang United's academy team with the likes of Syed Fadhil and Lionel Lewis. However, it was Home United who offered him a professional contract and was soon a regular in the team.

Faizal's promising exploits as a youngster with Home United caught national team coach, Radojko Avramovic's eyes and he was soon handed a debut against Indonesia in 2004. Unfortunately, only 19 minutes into his first ever international game, he suffered an injury and had to go off.

It was only 3 years later did he played for his country again. Having moved to S-League champions, SAFFC. He displaced national team defender, Hafiz Osman off his regular place. And so a friendly against UAE it was and he was soon back in the national team set-up.

Aside from football, Faizal Hamid holds a diploma in Electrical Engineering from Ngee Ann Polytechnic.

Faizal initially considered quitting football for a year to concentrate on his career in the Singapore Prison Service, but decided to put his plans on hold to play for the National Team in the 2010 FIFA World Cup Qualifiers.

He has since signed for Gombak United FC.
