= Sultan of Selangor's Cup =

Exhibition game

- Founded: 2001; 25 years ago
- Region: Malaysia; Singapore
- Teams: 2
- Current champions: Selangor Selection (12th title)
- Most championships: Selangor Selection (12 titles)
- Broadcaster: Sukan RTM

The Sultan of Selangor's Cup is an annual friendly football competition organized by the Football Association of Selangor, contested between two rival teams, Selangor FA and Singapore FA. The competition's official name was originally the Regent of Selangor's Cup, but it was renamed the Sultan of Selangor's Cup in 2003. The competition usually features two matches: Selangor Veterans versus Singapore Veterans and Selangor Selection versus Singapore Selection.

== History ==
The Sultan of Selangor Cup is founded by the current Sultan of Selangor, His Royal Highness Sultan Sharafuddin Idris Shah in 2001 to strengthen the ties between two rival teams, Selangor FA and Singapore FA and to rekindle their rivalry after Singapore pulled out of the Malaysian League in 1994. The rivalry between two teams are very intense because of their status as the two most successful teams in Malaysian football history and matches between the two sides has even been dubbed as the Malayan El'Clasico. Singapore FA squad consists of players from their own league.

The Sultan of Selangor’s Cup made its return in 2024 at the historic Merdeka Stadium after a seven-year hiatus due to the COVID-19 pandemic. Now, the next edition is set to take place on 27 September 2025, once again aiming to revive the traditional rivalry and introduce the younger generation to the fiery clashes between Selangor and Singapore.

== Past tournaments ==
List of Sultan of Selangor's Cup matches
| Year | Date | Winners | Score | Runners-up | Venue | Attendance | Ref. |
|---|---|---|---|---|---|---|---|
| 2001 | 4 August | Selangor Selection | 0–0 (4–2p) | Singapore Selection | Shah Alam Stadium | | |
| 2003 | 29 March | Selangor Selection | 4–1 | Singapore Selection | Shah Alam Stadium | | |
| 2004 | 16 May | Selangor Selection^{a} Singapore Selection | 2–2^{†} | — | Singapore National Stadium | 40,000 | |
| 2005 | 24 May | Selangor Selection | 3–1 | Singapore Selection | Shah Alam Stadium | | |
| 2006 | 10 May | Singapore Selection | 3–0 | Selangor Selection^{a} | Singapore National Stadium | 22,560 | |
| 2007 | 11 August | Singapore Selection | 3–1 | Selangor Selection | Shah Alam Stadium | | |
| 2008 | 6 July | Selangor Selection | 2–2 (3–2p) | Singapore Selection | Shah Alam Stadium | | |
| 2009 | 4 October | Singapore Selection | 3–0 | Selangor Selection | Jalan Besar Stadium | | |
| 2010 | 16 October | Singapore Selection | 6–0 | Selangor Selection | Shah Alam Stadium | | |
| 2011 | 1 October | Singapore Selection | 1–0 | Selangor Selection | Shah Alam Stadium | | |
| 2012 | 29 September | Selangor Selection | 3–1 | Singapore Selection | Shah Alam Stadium | | |
| 2013 | 28 September | Selangor Selection | 3–2 | Singapore Selection | Shah Alam Stadium | | |
| 2014 | 27 September | Selangor Selection | 2–1 | Singapore Selection | Shah Alam Stadium | | |
| 2015 | | Cancelled due to 2015 Southeast Asian haze | | | | | |
| 2016 | 8 May | Singapore Selection | 1–1 (4–3p) | Selangor Selection | Shah Alam Stadium | 75,000 | |
| 2017 | 6 May | Singapore Selection | 3–2 | Selangor Selection^{b} | Singapore National Stadium | | |
| 2018 | 25 August | Selangor Selection | 1–1 (5–3p) | Singapore Selection | Shah Alam Stadium | | |
| 2019 | 24 August | Selangor Selection | 1–0 | Singapore Selection | Shah Alam Stadium | 60,000 | |
| 2020–2023 | | Cancelled due to COVID-19 pandemic in Malaysia | | | | | |
| 2024 | 17 August | Selangor Selection | 2–1 | Singapore Selection | Stadium Merdeka | 20,000 | |
| 2025 | 27 September | Selangor Selection | 2–1 | Singapore Selection | Stadium Merdeka | | |

Notes:

^† Both teams are announced as joint winners in 2004
^aOn 2004 and 2006, Selangor was represented by MPPJ FC.
^bOn 2017, Selangor was represented by PKNS FC

== Performances ==
=== By team ===
| Team | Winners | Runners-up | Years won | Years runner-up |
|---|---|---|---|---|
| Selangor Selection | 12 | 8 | 2001, 2003, 2004, 2005, 2008, 2012, 2013, 2014, 2018, 2019, 2024, 2025 | 2006, 2007, 2009, 2010, 2011, 2016, 2017 |
| Singapore Selection | 8 | 12 | 2004, 2006, 2007, 2009, 2010, 2011, 2016, 2017 | 2001, 2003, 2005, 2008, 2012, 2013, 2014, 2018, 2019, 2024, 2025 |

== See also ==
- Malayan El'Clasico
- Malaysia Cup
- Malaysia FA Cup
- Piala Sumbangsih
- History of Malaysian football
