= China–Hong Kong football rivalry =

International football rivalry

Hong Kong football rivalry
- Location: Asia (AFC); East Asia (EAFF)
- Teams: China; Hong Kong
- First meeting: 7 February 1978; Friendly; Hong Kong 1–4 China
- Latest meeting: 15 July 2025; EAFF E-1 Football Championship; China 1–0 Hong Kong

Statistics
- Total meetings: 24
- Most wins: China (16)
- All-time series: China: 16; Draw: 5 Hong Kong: 3
- Largest victory: China 7–0 Hong Kong; FIFA World Cup qualification (17 November 2004)

The China–Hong Kong football rivalry is a sports rivalry between the national association football teams of the People's Republic of China (mainland) and Hong Kong. The rivalry has been exacerbated by Hong Kong's status as a Special Administrative Region of China, with major political and ideological differences than on the mainland, a legacy of having been under British colonial rule until the transfer of sovereignty in 1997.

== Historical overview ==
China and Hong Kong have been playing each other in football matches since a friendly in Hong Kong in 1978. In the past, Hong Kong players tended to play under the Republic of China team. In 1985, Hong Kong, then a British dependent territory, played China in the AFC first round 1986 FIFA World Cup qualification group. The final match at Workers’ Stadium, Beijing meant China only needed to avoid defeat to progress and Hong Kong had to win. Despite this, Hong Kong won 2–1. In response, Chinese fans blocked the Hong Kong team from leaving and started rioting in China's first known case of football hooliganism.

In 1997, Hong Kong was handed over from the United Kingdom to China but was permitted to continue to field a separate national football team under the terms of the Sino-British Joint Declaration despite its new status as a Special Administrative Region of China under the One Country, Two Systems policy. In 2003, when China and Hong Kong were drawn together during the AFC 2006 FIFA World Cup qualification, former China national football team manager, Bora Milutinovic stated: "This is incredible. How can China play Hong Kong? Hong Kong is China. They are the same country." During this campaign, China won both matches: winning 1–0 in Hong Kong and 7–0 in China.

In 2015, Hong Kong was drawn into the same group with China again for the third time. This time, Hong Kong held China to a goalless draw for both legs. Despite this, China still advanced to the next round.

In 2019, Hong Kong was defeated 2–0 by China in the EAFF E-1 Football Championship.

On 1 January 2024, Hong Kong defeated China 2–1 in an international friendly. This win marked the first triumph in 39 years for Hong Kong over China. Both of Hong Kong's goals were scored by Poon Pui Hin. South China Morning Post also reported that two Chinese players and a coach were red carded during the game.

== The "19 May Incident" ==
In 1985, Hong Kong, then a British dependent territory, played China in the AFC first round 1986 FIFA World Cup qualification group. The final match at Workers’ Stadium, Beijing meant China only needed to avoid defeat to progress and Hong Kong had to win. However, Cheung Chi Tak gave Hong Kong the lead in the 19th minute. Li Hui equalised 12 minutes later, but Ku Kam Fai's goal at 60 minutes gave Hong Kong the win. Chinese fans were deeply unsatisfied with the final result, and they blocked the Hong Kong team from leaving and started rioting in China's first known case of football hooliganism. It wasn't until 2002 that China finally qualified for the World Cup for the first time.

== 2006 World Cup qualification ==
In 2003, China and Hong Kong were once again drawn into the same group (Group 4). The first match in Hong Kong resulted in a 0–1 loss for Hong Kong via a goal scored by Hao Haidong.

However, Kuwait later defeated China 1–0. China would have to defeat Hong Kong by a margin of 8 goals in order to advance. However, the final result was 7–0, 1 goal away from qualifying. Hong Kong goalkeeper Fan Chun Yip made many crucial saves in the tournament, including saving a penalty by Zheng Zhi, which "indirectly" prevented China from advancing. Fan was named by Mainland newspapers as "The Bane of China". Most Hong Kong fans honoured him as a hero. Oddly, Oriental Daily News mocked that Fan was "flaunting his superiority".

== 2018 World Cup qualification ==
During the 2018 FIFA World Cup qualification, China and Hong Kong were drawn in the same group for the second round. The political situation between the two countries had been made tenser by the Umbrella Movement in Hong Kong in 2014.

The first fixture was at Bao'an Stadium, Shenzhen. The match ended in a 0–0 draw. China had significantly more possession as well as chances, but all of their attempts either hit the woodwork, were saved by Hong Kong's goalkeeper Yapp Hung-fai, or were cleared off the line by Hong Kong's defenders. In contrast, the Hong Kong team only had one close chance, as an attempt to directly score from a corner kick by Lam Ka Wai was punched away by the goalkeeper. In injury time, a header by Zhang Linpeng was blocked by Chan Siu Ki's outstretched arm. However, the referee did not award a penalty despite protests by the China national team.

The second match in Mongkok Stadium ended in a goalless draw too. Just like the first match, China had a lot of chances that either hit the woodwork or were saved by Yapp. The Hong Kong national team had several header chances in this match too, but Jaimes McKee's header hit the crossbar and Sandro's header hit the top of the net. There were several controversial refereeing decisions in this match, as a goal by Festus Baise from Hong Kong was not awarded due to Paulinho fouling the Chinese goalkeeper, while the referee did not award Yu Dabao's attempt a goal as well despite the Chinese team's claims that the ball had completely crossed the line before Yapp pushed it back into play. The Chinese Football Association sacked manager Alain Perrin, something which the Hong Kong Football Association chairman, Brian Leung attributed to China's draws with Hong Kong.

=== Racism and national anthem controversy ===
Prior to the first match in China, the Chinese Football Association released a poster calling the Hong Kong national football team "Hong Kong, China" and stating "This team has players with black skin, yellow skin and white skin. Best to be on guard against such a multi-layered team!" in reference to the multi-racial Hong Kong national team. This was criticised as racist in Hong Kong. In response Hong Kong fans in following matches started booing the Chinese national anthem "March of the Volunteers", played as Hong Kong's anthem since 1997 when it replaced "God Save the Queen". As a result of the booing, FIFA fined the Hong Kong Football Association HK$ 40,000.

Hong Kong fans were warned not to insult the Chinese flag or anthem to "endanger national security" at the risk of being arrested. The match ended 0–0, where the People's Armed Police attended armed with riot control equipment. On the day of the return match between Hong Kong and China at Mong Kok Stadium in Hong Kong, the 500 Chinese away fans were escorted from the border crossing at Shenzhen to the stadium and entering in a separate entrance while being abused by Hong Kong fans. The Hong Kong Police Force had 1,300 officers, approximately one for every five spectators, on duty for the match. Inside, the Chinese fans waved red flags, a symbol of communism which is not practiced in Hong Kong, and sung Chinese Communist songs. Hong Kong fans responded by chanting "We are Hong Kong" and held up banners saying "Hong Kong is not China" in English. When "March of the Volunteers" was played, Hong Kong fans booed it while also turning their backs and holding up signs with "boo" written on them. Because of the booing of the Chinese national anthem, FIFA fined the Hong Kong Football Association HK$78,000 for a repeat offense. In 2016 at Hong Kong's first home match for a year against the Cambodia national football team at Mong Kok Stadium, the Hong Kong fans continued to boo the Chinese national anthem. Hong Kong fans have also booed the Chinese national anthem in matches against Bhutan and Maldives, and also on other occasions.

Hong Kong football fans have booed the Chinese national anthem on different occasions in 2017 as well, for example in a 2–0 win against Malaysia and a 0–2 loss against Bahrain. This caused the PRC to pass a law that people who disrespect the national anthem can be penalised or sent to prison.

== Dai Wai Tsun national team controversy ==
Dai Wai Tsun, a Hong Kong professional footballer, is the second Hong Kong player to appear in an English professional match and has played for Bury, Oxford United and the Wolverhampton Wanderers. He holds both a Hong Kong and British passport and therefore is eligible to play for either Hong Kong, China, or England.

In September 2018, Dai was called up to the preliminary squad of the Hong Kong national team. Although it was initially reported that he had declined a Hong Kong call up due to injury, he later accepted a call up during the same window to a China under-21 training camp led by Guus Hiddink in Amsterdam. Two weeks after the camp, Dai was once again named in Hong Kong's preliminary squad for the 2019 EAFF E-1 Football Championship qualifiers.

Many Hong Kong fans were angry about Dai joining the Chinese training camp, with many labeling him a "traitor" on social media and asking him to never return to the city. Hong Kong coach at that time Gary White said that he would continue keeping Dai on his radar and try to put the best people on the field for Hong Kong, but if someone doesn't want to come, "they don't want to come".

Dai claimed that it was "too sensitive" for him to say whether he would play for China or not.

In 2019, Dai sparked controversy again during the 2019–20 Hong Kong protests. Dai posted a picture of Hong Kong police on Facebook, expressing his support for them. Many Hong Kong netizens criticized Dai for supporting the police. Dai deleted the post after the backlash.

In September 2020, he admitted in an interview that "if I had the opportunity to represent the Chinese team, I would be very honoured. My application is being processed and the club is helping me."

On 27 January 2022, Dai made his international debut for the Chinese senior team against Japan in the 2022 World Cup qualifier as a substitute at the 64th minute. Dai started against Hong Kong on 27 June 2022 in the 2022 EAFF E-1 Football Championship Finals and played 57 minutes in an eventual 1–0 win. Dai was given the derogatory nickname "Judai" (猶戴) by Hong Kong netizens as a result of his perceived betrayal and was frequently the subject of abuse on his Instagram account.

== 2019 EAFF E-1 Football Championship ==
Hong Kong played China once again in the 2019 EAFF E-1 Football Championship Finals in South Korea, during the ongoing anti-government protests in Hong Kong. Prior the match, mainland media reported that the "bottom line" for Chinese caretaker coach Li Tie is to beat Hong Kong and avoid finish bottom of the group. Both teams did not select full strength squads as this was not a major tournament.

During the match, there was an increased amount of police presence to counter fears of trouble from either set of fans. Security screening checked banners containing political slogans on their way to into the stadium, but some still made their way into the stadium, including a black flag bearing the protest slogan "Liberate Hong Kong, revolution of our times" and a British colonial flag. There were also reports of a confrontation between Hong Kong supporters and security guards. There were around 20 fans from China and nearly 200 fans from Hong Kong during the match, who loudly booed the Chinese national anthem once again before the match. However, footage of supporters booing the anthem was cut out by both CCTV in the mainland and HK Open TV in Hong Kong.

China scored an early goal in the 8th minute, as Hong Kong's lone striker Giovane was unable to clear a corner and the ball fell to Ji Xiang, who scored from close range. Giovane had multiple close attempts after his mistake before halftime that were saved by Chinese goalkeeper Liu Dianzuo, with one of them being tipped onto the crossbar.

In the second half, a deep free kick by Hong Kong found Tan Chun Lok but Chinese captain Yu Dabao was able to block the shot. Chinese player Li Ang also came close with 2 free kicks, but they were both saved by Yapp Hung-fai. Hong Kong defender Helio brought down Dong Xuesheng in the 71st minute, and Zhang Xizhe scored the resulting penalty. Despite Hong Kong's late push, China went on to win the game 2–0. China dominated possession in the game, with 70% of the ball, although the amount of chances were more equal compared to their prior meeting, both teams having 9 shots.

== Club football ==
Chinese clubs had previously set up satellite teams to compete in Hong Kong's football leagues. Starting with Dongguan Lanwa, who were then replaced after two years by Chinese Super League team Chengdu Blades' reserve team, Sheffield United. In 2016, Guangzhou R&F F.C., after receiving approval from the Hong Kong Football Association, created R&F F.C. for their youth team to compete in the Hong Kong Premier League. There was an arrangement that the players would reside in Guangzhou but play their home matches in Hong Kong and that they had to field Hong Kong eligible players. There were opposition to R&F's participation in Hong Kong football, with the perception that the Chinese team were being given preferential treatment to compete in the Hong Kong Premier League ahead of local Hong Kong clubs. In 2015, the Chinese Football Association changed their policy in that Hong Kong players in the Chinese Super League would from 2016 be registered as foreign players rather than as "local players". Such change is partially viewed among Hong Kong players as being done because Hong Kong players were able to earn more in deeper-pocketed Chinese clubs due to the players' "local player" statuses, despite the Hong Kong Football Association's independence. After 4 years in the HKPL, R&F officially announced that they would withdraw from the league on 14 October 2020.

At the club level, Hong Kong and Chinese teams rarely play each other, since the league structure in Hong Kong is smaller than that of China's. In the 2017 AFC Champions League, Hong Kong club Eastern SC and Chinese club Guangzhou Evergrande were drawn together into Group G. The teams played each other on 22 February in Guangzhou and 25 April in Hong Kong. On 22 February, Hong Kong club Eastern lost 7–0 to Guangzhou in match played in Tianhe Stadium. They lost the return fixture 6–0 in Mong Kok Stadium, Hong Kong. For the 2018 AFC Champions League, Chinese club Tianjin Quanjian and Hong Kong club Kitchee were drawn in the same group. On 13 February 2018, Tianjin Quanjian defeated Kitchee 3–0 in China. On 4 April 2018, Kitchee lost to Tianjin Quanjian again at home, this time 0–1.

In the 2021 AFC Champions League, Kitchee was drawn into the same group as Guangzhou F.C. As Chinese teams were unable to send their strongest squads to the tournament due to COVID-19 restrictions, Kitchee won 1–0 on both encounters. Both teams ultimately failed to qualify for the knockout phase.

=== Yapp Hung Fai transfer controversy ===
During the summer of 2013, Yapp had agreed to a 4.5-year contract with Guizhou Renhe. However, his registration was denied by the Chinese Football Association on the grounds that Yapp did not qualify as a domestic player and as such, would violate the Chinese Super League stipulations which require all keepers to be domestic players.

Yapp protested the ruling by displaying a banner saying "I am Chinese, not a foreign player." Yapp was mocked and given the nickname "China Fai" by Hong Kong netizens. However, 2 years later before Hong Kong played China for the 2018 World Cup qualifiers, Yapp claimed that he "does not feel any relationship with China", and stated his desire to stop China from qualifying even if Hong Kong would be eliminated. He claimed he was instructed by Guizhou Renhe to display the banner and would not do it again.
