= Merzagua Abderrazak =

Moroccan footballer

Personal information
- Date of birth: 1967
- Place of birth: Morocco
- Position: Striker

Senior career*
Years	Team	Apps	(Gls)
1995-1996	Penang FA		
1998	Penang FA	4	(0)
2001	Gombak United FC		

Managerial career
- 2012–2013: Penang FA
- 2014–2015: Sungai Ara F.C.
- * Club domestic league appearances and goals

Merzagua Abderrazak (born 1967 in Morocco) is a Moroccan former professional footballer and head coach.

On 4 August 2001, he played in 2001 Sultan of Selangor Cup as a guest player.

== Playing career ==
=== Penang ===
Brought in as a foreign player to Malaysian side Penang in the early 1990s. He joined Penang FA in 1995 and left the team in the next year. In 1998, he came back to Penang FA and helped the team won championships in 1998 after he scored the winning goal against Selangor FA at Shah Alam in the last minutes and that was the last league game. Called the 'Great Merz' by besotted fans, he has been described as one of the greatest foreign footballers to have ever played in Malaysia and Southeast Asia.

=== Gombak United ===
Moving to Gombak United of Singapore in 2001, Abderrazak reunited with his former Penang coach Moey Yoke Ham and Guinean Ballamodou Conde wearing the number 9. However, the forward was unable to concentrate on football due to his family business in Morocco failing. In the end, he left the club to support his family's business, apologizing to mentor Moey Yoke Ham along the way.

== Coaching career ==
=== Penang ===
Announced as Penang head coach in late 2012, Abderrazak's aim was to lift the club out of the third-tier Malaysia FAM League. Of the first three friendlies the team played through the preseason, they recorded two losses but won once against Perak of the Malaysia Super League thanks to the home fans. Leading the club to the 2013 FAM League championship and promotion to the 2014 Malaysia Premier League, Abderrazak was disallowed from being their coach for the upcoming season in the second tier as he did not have the coaching badges that the league entailed. Three years later, the Moroccan earned his licenses and a number of sources close to Penang stated that he could return to helm the state team which never happened.

Abderrazak was disappointed with Penang's performance in the 2017 Malaysia Super League as his former club were at the bottom of the league table. Ever since his departure, he has been appraising the Panthers performances in competitions.

=== Sungai Ara FC ===
Picked to take the reins of Penang-based outfit Sungai Ara on a one-year contract in late 2014, the former striker was greeted by supporters, players and officials upon arrival to the Malaysian state. Improving the fitness level and morale of the players ahead of the season with six months of preparation and 30 friendlies played, his target was to gain promotion to the Malaysia Premier League by 2016, expressing gratefulness to the board.

=== Penang FC ===
In 2024, Merzagua was appointed as a Technical Director at Penang F.C.

== Honours ==
=== As player ===
Penang

- Malaysia Premier 1 League (2): 1998, 2001

=== As coach ===
Penang

- Malaysia FAM League: 2013
