= Khaled Al-Shemmari =

Kuwaiti footballer

Personal information
- Full name: Khaled Khader Mubarak Al-Shemmari
- Date of birth: 1965 (age 60–61)
- Place of birth: Kuwait
- Height: 1.84 m (6 ft 0 in)
- Position: Goalkeeper

Senior career*
Years	Team	Apps	(Gls)
1980–1996	Kazma SC		

International career
1984–1992	Kuwait		
- * Club domestic league appearances and goals

Khaled Al-Shemmari is a Kuwaiti football goalkeeper who played for Kuwait in the 1984 Asian Cup.

== Honours ==
- Asian Cup:

Third Place : 1984
