= Latif Rahman =

Singaporean footballer

Personal information
- Place of birth: Singapore
- Position: Midfielder

International career
Years	Team	Apps	(Gls)
- Singapore

Latif Rahman is a Singaporean football midfielder who played for Singapore in the 1984 Asian Cup.

Latif played for the Singapore Armed Forces Sports Association.

In 1984, Latif first represented Singapore in the 1984 Asian Cup.

In 1985, Latif was part of the Singapore national football team which played in the Asian zone qualification rounds for the 1986 FIFA World Cup.
