= Yang Ning =

Chinese footballer

Yang Ning 杨宁
Personal information
- Date of birth: April 10, 1962 (age 64)
- Place of birth: Meizhou, Guangdong, China
- Height: 1.83 m (6 ft 0 in)
- Position: Goalkeeper

Senior career*
Years	Team	Apps	(Gls)
1978–1988	Guangdong team		

International career
1980–1986	China	15	(0)
Medal record
Men's football
Representing China
AFC Asian Cup
Silver medal – second place	1984 Singapore	Team
- * Club domestic league appearances and goals

Yang Ning (Chinese 杨宁 born in 1962) is a Chinese former football goalkeeper who played for Guangdong team and the Chinese national team who he represented in the 1984 Asian Cup.

== Career ==
Yang Ning grew up into a football family and quickly rose through the ranks before he graduated into the senior team of Guangdong team within the 1978 Chinese league season. The following season he went on to be part of the team that went on to win the 1979 Chinese league title. This soon saw him called up to the Chinese national team in 1980, which made him the youngest goalkeeper ever to be included in the national team. He was then included in the squad that played within the 1982 Asian Games before being the first-choice goalkeeper that came runners-up within the 1984 AFC Asian Cup. After playing in the 1986 Asian Games he retired several years later and moved to San Francisco.

== Career statistics ==
=== International statistics ===
Year	Competition	Apps	Goal
1983–1984	Friendly	7	0
1984	Great Wall Cup	2	0
1984	Asian Cup Qualification	4	0
1984	Asian Cup	2	0
Total		15	0

== Honours ==
- Chinese Jia-A League: 1979
