= Abdullah Al-Edan =

Qatari footballer

Personal information
- Place of birth: Qatar
- Position: Defender

International career
Years	Team	Apps	(Gls)
- Qatar

Abdullah Al-Edan is a Qatar football defender who played for Qatar in the 1984 Asian Cup.
