= George Khouri (footballer) =

Syrian footballer (born 1962)

Personal information
- Date of birth: 1962 (age 63–64)
- Place of birth: Damascus, Syria
- Position: Midfielder

Senior career*
Years	Team	Apps	(Gls)
- Al-Jaish
- Tishreen

International career
1981–1989	Syria	74	(8)
- * Club domestic league appearances and goals

George Khouri (Arabic: جورج خوري) is a retired Syrian footballer who played for the Syria national football team during the 1980s.

== Career ==
Khouri spent most of his career in Al-Jaish, then played for Tishreen, and in Oman.

He played for Syria in different tournaments such as: 1984 AFC Asian Cup, 1986 FIFA World Cup qualification (AFC), 1988 Arab Nations Cup, 1988 AFC Asian Cup and 1987 Mediterranean Games in which he managed to win a penalty for Syria to beat France B 2–1 in the final.
