= Lü Hongxiang =

Chinese footballer

Lü Hongxiang (吕洪祥)
Personal information
- Full name: 吕洪祥
- Date of birth: March 27, 1960 (age 66)
- Place of birth: Tianjin, China
- Height: 1.79 m (5 ft 10 in)
- Positions: Left midfielder; wingback; striker

Senior career*
Years	Team	Apps	(Gls)
1979–1987	Tianjin team		
1987–1990	Fujitsu FC		
1991	Tokyo Gas		

International career
1983–1986	China	40	(0)
Medal record
Representing China
Men's football
AFC Asian Cup
Silver medal – second place	1984 Singapore	Team
- * Club domestic league appearances and goals

Lü Hongxiang (Chinese: 吕洪祥; born March 27, 1960) is a former Chinese international footballer who represented Tianjin before moving to Japan where he had spells at Fujitsu FC and Tokyo Gas, while internationally he represented China in the 1984 Asian Cup.

== Biography ==
Lu Hongxiang started his career in the 1979 Chinese league season with Tianjin team, where he showed he was capable of playing as a left midfielder, wingback or striker. The following season, he quickly established himself as one of the most skillful players in China and was part of the team that won the 1980 league title. This then saw him called up to the Chinese national team, where he was included in the squads that took part in the 1982 Asian Games and 1984 AFC Asian Cup where China came runners-up. By 1987 he had the chance to move abroad with Japanese side Fujitsu FC before ending his career with Tokyo Gas.

== Career statistics ==
=== International statistics ===
Competition	Year	Apps	Goal
Asian Games	1982–1986	8	0
Friendly	1983–1986	20	0
Asian Cup Qualifier	1984	4	0
Asian Cup	1984	3	0
World Cup Qualifier	1985	5	0
Total		40	0

== Honours ==
Tianjin team

- Chinese Jia-A League: 1980
