= Salman Al-Dosari =

Saudi Arabian footballer

Personal information
- Full name: Salman Ghassan Al-Namshan Al-Dosari
- Date of birth: 10 November 1963 (age 62)
- Place of birth: Saudi Arabia
- Position: Defender

Senior career*
Years	Team	Apps	(Gls)
- Al-Ettifaq Club

International career
1984	Saudi Arabia	7	(0)
- * Club domestic league appearances and goals

Salman Al-Dosari is a Saudi football defender who played for Saudi Arabia in the 1984 Asian Cup.
