= Abdulqadir Hassan =

Emirati footballer (born 1962)

Personal information
- Full name: Abdulqadir Hassan Mohamed
- Date of birth: 15 April 1962 (age 64)
- Place of birth: Trucial States
- Position: Goalkeeper

Senior career*
| Years | Team | Apps | (Gls) |
- Al Shabab

International career
| 1984–1992 | UAE | 22 | (0) |
- * Club domestic league appearances and goals

Abdulqadir Hassan Mohamed (Arabic: عَبْد الْقَادِر حَسَن مُحَمَّد) (born 15 April 1962) is an Emirati footballer. He played as a goalkeeper for the UAE national football team as well as Al-Shabab Club in Dubai.

Hassan was a member of the UAE squad at the 1990 FIFA World Cup finals. However, he did not play in any matches.
