= Abdul Majeed Kakroo =

Indian footballer

Personal information
- Place of birth: Jammu and Kashmir, India
- Position: Striker

Senior career*
Years	Team	Apps	(Gls)
1977–1988	Road Transport Corporation (RTC)	??	(??)
1988–1989	Mohun Bagan	??	(??)
- East Bengal Club

International career
1983–1988	India	12	(0)
Medal record
Men's football
Representing India
South Asian Games
Gold medal – first place	1987 Calcutta	Team
- * Club domestic league appearances and goals

Abdul Majeed Kakroo is a retired Indian footballer from Kashmir who played as a striker and he represented India at the 1984 Asian Cup. He became the first player from Kashmir to captain India when he captained the team during the 1987 Nehru Cup. He played for both Mohun Bagan and East Bengal during his club career. One of the stands at the TRC Turf Ground has been named after him by Real Kashmir FC.

== Club career ==
He signed his first professional contract in 1977 with Road Transport Cooperation (RTC). He was paid a salary of Rs.180 per month. He helped RTC reach the quarterfinals of the Durand Cup where they lost to JCT. He also represented Jammu and Kashmir in the Santosh Trophy tournament. He later went on to play for East Bengal and Mohun Bagan and became one of the highest paid footballers in the country. Kakroo had to cut short his football career in Kolkata after he received threats from militants to return home.

== International career ==
After impressing in the Durand Cup in 1979–80, he was called up to the National Team camp. He wasn't selected for the final team and was told to improve his game with the left foot. He later went on to play for the national team for 8 years. He was a part of the Indian squad that played in the 1984 Asian Cup. Later, he captained the national team in the 1987 Nehru Cup. He scored goals against China and Malaysia in the 1983 President's Cup. He played a total of 12 official matches with the National team.

== Honours ==
India

- South Asian Games Gold medal: 1987
