= S. Ramu =

Singaporean footballer

S.Ramu
Personal information
- Place of birth: Singapore
- Position: Forward

International career
Years	Team	Apps	(Gls)
- Singapore

S. Ramu is a Singaporean football forward who played for Singapore in the 1984 Asian Cup.
