= Salem Naseeb =

Emirati footballer

Personal information
- Place of birth: United Arab Emirates

International career
Years	Team	Apps	(Gls)
- United Arab Emirates

Salem Naseeb (Arabic: سَالِم نَصِيب) is a football player from the United Arab Emirates who played for United Arab Emirates in the 1984 Asian Cup.
