= Mohammad Reza Shakourzadeh =

Iranian footballer

Personal information
- Place of birth: Iran
- Position: Defender

Senior career*
Years	Team	Apps	(Gls)
1984–1986	Shahin F.C.		
1986–1991	Esteghlal FC		

International career
1984	Iran	3	(0)
- * Club domestic league appearances and goals

Mohammad Reza Shakourzadeh is an Iranian football defender who played for Iran in the 1984 Asian Cup. He also played for Shahin F.C.

== International Records ==
Year	Apps	Goal
1984	2	0
Total	2	0

== Honours ==
- Asian Cup:

Fourth Place : 1984
