= Leung Sui Wing =

Hong Kong footballer

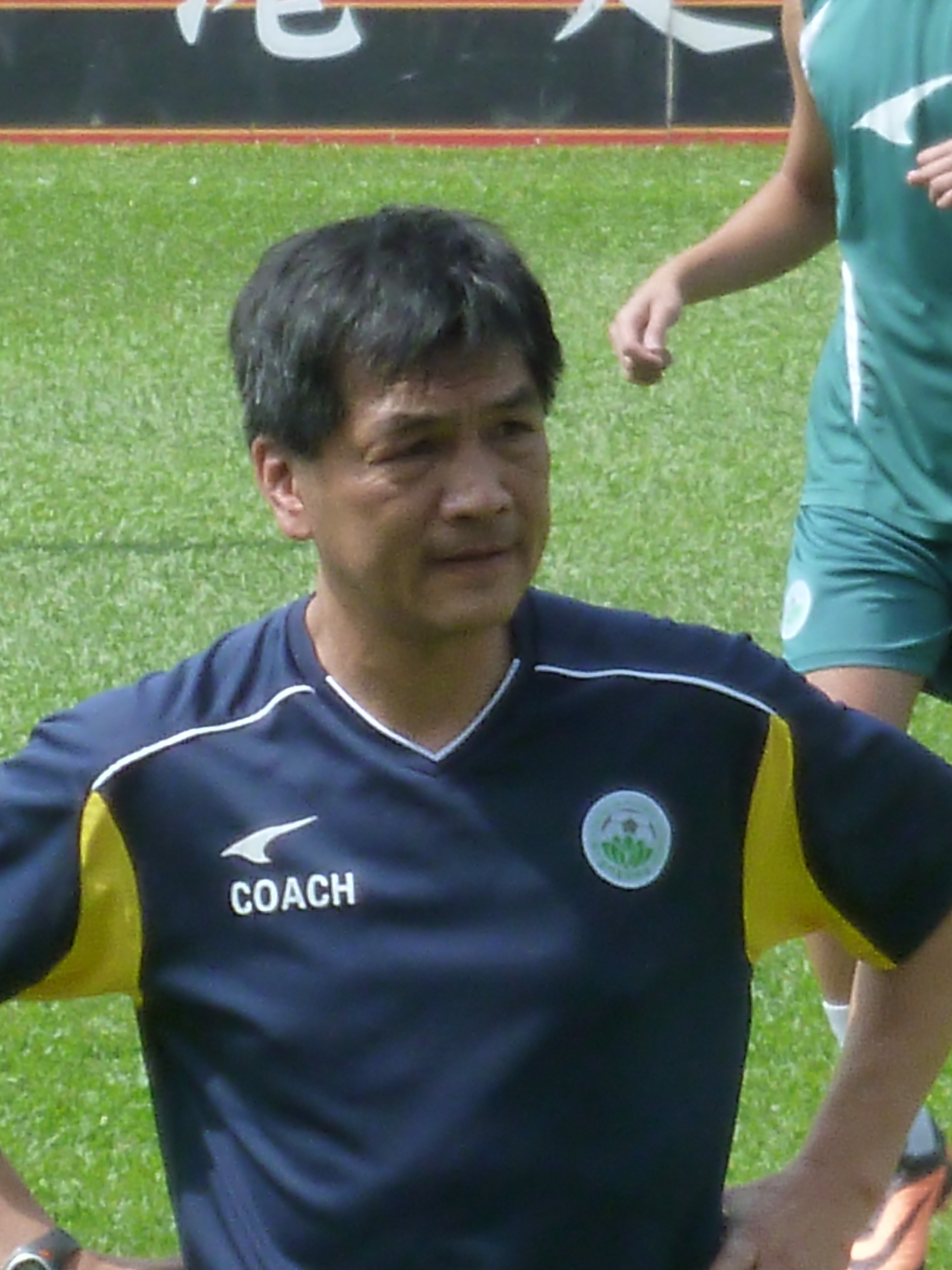

Personal information
- Full name: Leung Sui Wing
- Date of birth: 22 May 1958 (age 68)
- Place of birth: Hong Kong
- Position: Sweeper

Senior career*
Years	Team	Apps	(Gls)
1976–1997	Happy Valley		

International career^{‡}
1980–1989	Hong Kong	46	(1)

Managerial career
- 2008–2015: Macau
- * Club domestic league appearances and goals as of 30 June 2009 ‡ National team caps and goals as of 30 June 2009

Leung Sui Wing
- Chinese: 梁帥榮
Transcriptions
Standard Mandarin
- Hanyu Pinyin: Liáng Shuàiróng
- Wade–Giles: Ling Shuai-jung
- Yale Romanization: Lyáng Shwàirúng
- IPA: [ljǎŋ ʂwâɪɻʊ̌ŋ]
Yue: Cantonese
- Jyutping: Loeng4 Seoi3 Wing4
- IPA: [lœ̏ːŋ sɵ̄y wȉːŋ]

Leung Sui Wing (Chinese: 梁帥榮; born 22 May 1958) is a former Hong Kong professional football player who played as a sweeper.

== Club career ==
He spent his entire career with Happy Valley. He was the Hong Kong Footballer of the Year in 1983 and 1986.

== International career ==
Leung was the captain of Hong Kong when Hong Kong beat China on 19 May 1985 in a FIFA World Cup qualifying match that eliminated China.

Sporting positions
Preceded by Wu Kwok Hung	Hong Kong national football team Captain; 1982–1989	Succeeded by Cheung Chi Tak
