= Choi Gwang-ji =

South Korean footballer

Choi Gwang-Ji
Personal information
- Full name: 5 June 1963 (age 63)
- Place of birth: South Korea
- Position: Forward

Senior career*
Years	Team	Apps	(Gls)
1984–1985	Kwangwoon University		

International career
1984–1985	South Korea	5	(0)
- * Club domestic league appearances and goals

Choi Gwang-Ji is a Korean football forward who played for South Korea in the 1984 Asian Cup. He also played for Kwangwoon University

== International Records ==
Year	Apps	Goal
1984	3	0
1985	2	0
Total	5	0
