= Musaed Ibrahim =

Saudi Arabian footballer

Personal information
- Full name: Musaed Ibrahim Al-Suwailem
- Date of birth: November 18, 1965
- Place of birth: Saudi Arabia
- Position: Forward

Senior career*
| Years | Team | Apps | (Gls) |
- Al Shabab

International career
| 1984–1985 | Saudi Arabia | 5 | (0) |
- * Club domestic league appearances and goals

Musaed Ibrahim Al-Suwailem is a Saudi football midfielder who played for Saudi Arabia.

== Record at FIFA Tournaments ==
| Year | Competition | Apps | Goal |
|---|---|---|---|
| 1985 | FIFA U-20 World Cup | 3 | 0 |
| 1984 | FIFA World Cup qualification | 1 | 0 |
| Total | | 4 | 0 |
