= Kumar Krishnan =

Singaporean footballer

Personal information
- Place of birth: Singapore
- Position: Goalkeeper

Senior career*
Years	Team	Apps	(Gls)
1981	Tampines Rovers FC		
1982–????	SAFSA		

International career
1981–????	Singapore		
- * Club domestic league appearances and goals

Kumar Krishnan is a Singaporean football goalkeeper who played for Singapore in the 1984 Asian Cup.

== Club career ==
Kumar first signed for Tampines Rovers FC in 1981.

He then signed for Singapore Armed Forces Sports Association (SAFSA) in 1982.

== International career ==
Kumar was called up to the national team in 1981.

== Coaching career ==
After retirement from competitive football, Kumar became a goalkeeper coach.
