= Abdul Nafee Hamwieh =

Syrian footballer

Personal information
- Place of birth: Syria
- Position: Defender

International career
Years	Team	Apps	(Gls)
- Syria

Abdul Nafee Hamwieh (Arabic: عبد النافع حموية) is a Syrian football defender who played for Syria in the 1984 Asian Cup.
