= Mohammed Al-Husain =

Saudi Arabian footballer

Personal information
- Full name: Mohammed Al-Mutlaq Al-Hussain
- Date of birth: 10 April 1960 (age 66)
- Place of birth: Saudi Arabia
- Position: Goalkeeper

International career
Years	Team	Apps	(Gls)
1984	Saudi Arabia	4	(0)

Mohammed Al-Husain is a Saudi football goalkeeper who played for Saudi Arabia in the 1984 Asian Cup.
