= Hafez Tahouni =

Iranian footballer

Personal information
- Place of birth: Iran
- Position: Goalkeeper

International career
Years	Team	Apps	(Gls)
1984–1985	Iran	4	(0)

Hafez Tahouni is an Iranian retired football goalkeeper who played for Iran in the 1984 Asian Cup.

== International Records ==
Year	Apps	Goal
1984	2	0
1985	2	0
Total	4	0

== Honours ==
- Asian Cup:

Fourth Place : 1984
