= Majid Maayouf =

Qatari footballer (born 1961)

Personal information
- Date of birth: October 4, 1961
- Place of birth: Qatar
- Position: Defender

International career
Years	Team	Apps	(Gls)
1981–1982	Qatar	10	(0)

Majid Maayouf is a Qatari football defender who played for Qatar in the 1984 Asian Cup.

== Record at FIFA Tournaments ==
Year	Competition	Apps	Goal
1981	FIFA U-20 World Cup	6	0
1982	FIFA World Cup qualification	4	0
Total		10	0
