= Hussein Aljunied =

Singaporean footballer and manager

Personal information
- Birth name: Hussein bin Aljunied
- Date of birth: 1943
- Place of birth: Singapore
- Date of death: 5 March 2016 (aged 73)
- Place of death: Singapore General Hospital, Singapore
- Positions: Forward; midfielder

Senior career*
Years	Team	Apps	(Gls)
- Warriors FC

International career
1970s	Singapore	1+	

Managerial career
- 1976–1977: Singapore (assistant)
- 1984–1986: Singapore
- 1983–1988: Warriors
- 1990–1993: Brunei
- 1994–1996: Tampines Rovers
- * Club domestic league appearances and goals

Hussein bin Aljunied (1943 – 5 March 2016), also called Habib, was a Singaporean football player and manager. He was high respected as the national head coach of both Singapore and Brunei throughout the 1980s and 90s.

== Managerial career ==
In charge of the Singapore national team from 1984 to 1986. He guided the team to both the Southeast Asian (SEA) Games Final and the Malaysia League championship in 1985. In the 1985 Merlion Cup, he also guided Singapore to a joint championship victory with Yugoslavia. After his management in his home country, he had a managerial stint with the Brunei national team from 1990 until 1993. Only two international matches were completed during his time in Brunei, each ending in a draw and defeat against the Philippines in 1991. The majority of his work was with the Brunei representative team playing in the Malaysian Liga Semi-Pro second division.

== International career ==
Habib was the national team's captain in 1971.

== Personal life and death ==
Habib was fans of both Manchester United and Manchester City. He had previously served with the Singapore Army as a warrant officer.

Habib had reportedly been warded at the Singapore General Hospital while suffering from a severe lung illness due to pneumonia, kidney failure and a weak heart. The former head coach died on 5 March 2016, leaving behind his wife, son, three daughters, and ten grandkids. Prayers were held at Sultan Mosque, where several football figures attended. President of the Asian Football Confederation (AFC), Salman bin Ibrahim Al Khalifa, sent his condolences.

== Honours ==
- Liga Malaysia: 1985
