= Norhalis Shafik =

Singaporean footballer

Norhalis Shafik (born 1962) is a Singaporean football Defender who played for Singapore in the 1984 Asian Cup. He also played for Terengganu and Geylang International.
