= Amer Al-Amer =

Kuwaiti footballer

Personal information
- Place of birth: Kuwait
- Position: Forward

International career
Years	Team	Apps	(Gls)
- Kuwait

Amer Al-Amer is a Kuwaiti football forward who played for Kuwait in the 1984 Asian Cup.

== Honours ==
- Asian Cup:

Third Place : 1984
