= Hazali Nasiron =

Singaporean footballer

Personal information
- Place of birth: Singapore
- Position: Defender

International career
Years	Team	Apps	(Gls)
- Singapore

Hazali Nasiron is a Singaporean football defender who played for Singapore in the 1984 Asian Cup.
