= Zahid Ahmad (footballer) =

Singaporean footballer

Personal information
- Date of birth: 11 March 1978 (age 48)
- Place of birth: Singapore
- Position: Defender

Senior career*
Years	Team	Apps	(Gls)
1997	Tanjong Pagar United FC		
1998-1999	Geylang International FC		
2000-2001	Warriors FC		
2001-2005	Geylang International FC		
2006	Home United Football Club		
2007-2008	Woodlands Wellington FC		
2009	Hougang United FC	18	(0)
2010-2011	Tampines Rovers FC	28	(0)
2012-2014	Tanjong Pagar United FC	46	(0)
- * Club domestic league appearances and goals

Zahid Ahmad (born 11 March 1978 in Singapore) is a Singaporean retired footballer.

== Career ==
In 2014, Ahmad was forced to retire after the Singaporean S.League ruled that clubs cannot have more than 5 outfield players over the age of 30.

== Personal life ==
Ahmad has 2 children.
