= Lim Chan Yew =

Malaysian footballer

Personal information
- Date of birth: 14 October 1978 (age 48)
- Place of birth: Kuala Lumpur, Malaysia
- Position: Defender

Senior career*
Years	Team	Apps	(Gls)
1999-2002	Selangor FA		
2003	Negeri Sembilan FA		
2004	Public Bank F.C.		
2005-2006	MPPJ Selangor F.C.		
2006-2007	Selangor FA		

International career
2000-2005	Malaysia	6	(0)
- * Club domestic league appearances and goals

Lim Chan Yew (Chinese: 林灿耀; born 14 October 1978 in Malaysia) is a Malaysian retired footballer.

On 4 August 2001, he played in 2001 Sultan of Selangor Cup.

He also the former member of Malaysia national team.

== Honours ==
Selangor

- Malaysia Cup: 2002

Negeri Sembilan

- Malaysia FA Cup: 2003
