= Salah Rashid Mohamed =

Emirati footballer

Salah Rashed
Personal information
- Full name: Salah Rashed Mohammed Al-Ansari
- Place of birth: Dubai, United Arab Emirates
- Position: Midfielder

Senior career*
Years	Team	Apps	(Gls)
	Al-Ahli Dubai		(7)

International career
- 1 United Arab Emirates
- * Club domestic league appearances and goals

Salah Rashed Mohammed Al-Ansari (Arabic: صَلَاح رَاشِد مُحَمَّد الْأَنْصَارِيّ) is a football player from the United Arab Emirates

== Player Profile ==
Position: Midfielder.

Number: 7.

Favorite Leg: Left Leg.

Known as: Freekick Shooter. (Attributed due to scoring precise goals from free kicks.)

Played for:

- Al-Ahli Club, Dubai, UAE.
- United Arab Emiratesin in the 1984 Asian Cup.
