= Malek Shakuhi =

Syrian footballer (born 1960)

Personal information
- Date of birth: 5 April 1960 (age 66)
- Place of birth: Syria
- Position: Goalkeeper

Youth career
- 1970–1978: Hutteen

Senior career*
Years	Team	Apps	(Gls)
1978–1979	Hutteen		
1979–1987	Al-Jaish		
1987–1994	Jableh		
1994–1995	Tishreen		
1995–2001	Jableh		
2001	Qardaha		

International career
1978–1995	Syria		
- * Club domestic league appearances and goals

Malek Shakuhi (Arabic: مالك شكوحي; born 5 April 1960) is a Syrian football goalkeeper who played for Syria at the 1984 Asian Cup and 1988 Asian Cup finals.
