= Lim Tang Boon =

Singaporean footballer

Personal information
- Place of birth: Singapore
- Position: Midfielder

International career
Years	Team	Apps	(Gls)
- Singapore

Lim Tang Boon is a Singaporean football midfielder who played for Singapore in the 1984 Asian Cup.

In 1980, Lim was voted player of the year.

On 26 December 1980, in a group match against North Korea during Singapore's 1982 FIFA World Cup qualification campaign, Fandi Ahmad earned a penalty against North Korea. Lim took the penalty kick which the North Korean goalkeeper saved. Singapore lost the match 1-0 and fail to quality beyond the group stage.

== Personal life ==
Lim worked at Hongkong and Shanghai Banking Corp from 1976 to 1992

In 1997, Lim was sentenced to two-year jail for taking $360,000 from an account at Hongkong and Shanghai Banking Corp in 1991 where he worked at.
