= Bandar Al-Nakhli =

Saudi Arabian footballer

Personal information
- Full name: Bandar Ibrahim Jarallah Al-Nakhli
- Place of birth: Saudi Arabia
- Position: Midfielder

Senior career*
Years	Team	Apps	(Gls)
- Al-Ahli

International career
1984–1985	Saudi Arabia	8	(0)
- * Club domestic league appearances and goals

Bandar Al-Nakhli is a Saudi Arabian footballer who played for the Saudi Arabia national football team in the 1984 Asian Cup.
