= Rahim Mirakhori =

Iranian footballer

Personal information
- Date of birth: 30 April 1956 (age 70)
- Place of birth: Iran
- Position: Defender

International career
Years	Team	Apps	(Gls)
1984–1985	Iran	10	(0)

Rahim Mirakhori (30 April 1956) is an Iranian football defender who played for Iran in the 1984 Asian Cup.

== International Records ==
Year	Apps	Goal
1984	6	0
1985	4	0
Total	10	0

== Honours ==
- Asian Cup:

Fourth Place : 1984
