= Nasser Al-Meaweed =

Saudi Arabian footballer

Nasser Al-Mansoor
Personal information
- Full name: Nasser Fahad Adbdullah Al-Mansoor
- Place of birth: Saudi Arabia
- Position: Defender

Senior career*
Years	Team	Apps	(Gls)
- Al-Nahda

International career
1984–1986	Saudi Arabia	30	(0)
- * Club domestic league appearances and goals

, Nasser Fahad Adbdullah Al-Mansoor Al-Meaweed, known as Nasser Al-Mansoor, is a Saudi football defender who played for Saudi Arabia in the 1984 Asian Cup.
