= Cheung Chi Tak =

Hong Kong footballer

Personal information
- Full name: Cheung Chi Tak
- Date of birth: 15 September 1958 (age 68)
- Place of birth: British Hong Kong
- Position: Wing-back

Senior career*
Years	Team	Apps	(Gls)
1977–1978	HK Rangers		
1978–1981	Caroline Hill		
1981–1984	Eastern		
1984–1988	South China		
1988–1989	Lai Sun D'Flower		
1989–1991	Lai Sun		
1991–1997	Double Flower		

International career
1981–1997	Hong Kong	48	(1)
1992	Hong Kong (futsal)	3	(0)

Managerial career
- 1997–1999: HK Rangers
- * Club domestic league appearances and goals

Cheung Chi Tak (Chinese: 張志德; Cantonese Yale: Jēung Jidāk; born 15 September 1958), nicknamed Little Devil (Chinese: 細鬼; Cantonese Yale: Saigwái) in his playing days, is a former Hong Kong professional footballer who played as a wing-back.

== Early career ==
Cheung made his professional debut in 1977 with Hong Kong Rangers. When Rangers relegated to the Hong Kong Second Division League in 1978, he moved to Caroline Hill.

== Club career ==
In 1981, Cheung moved to Eastern and then to South China in 1984. In 1987, he moved to Lai Sun and then to Instant-Dict FC in 1991. He retired from playing in 1997.

== International career ==
Cheung scored an impressive 30-yard free kick in the infamous 1986 World Cup qualifying match against China PR, when Hong Kong produced an upset 2–1 win.

He competed for Hong Kong at the 1992 FIFA Futsal World Cup on home soil, along with Au Wai Lun and Leslie Santos.

== Retirement ==
After retirement, he became a sports commentator on Cable TV.

Sporting positions
Preceded by Leung Sui Wing	Hong Kong national football team captain 1990–1992	Succeeded by Ku Kam Fai
