= Chan Fat Chi =

Hong Kong footballer

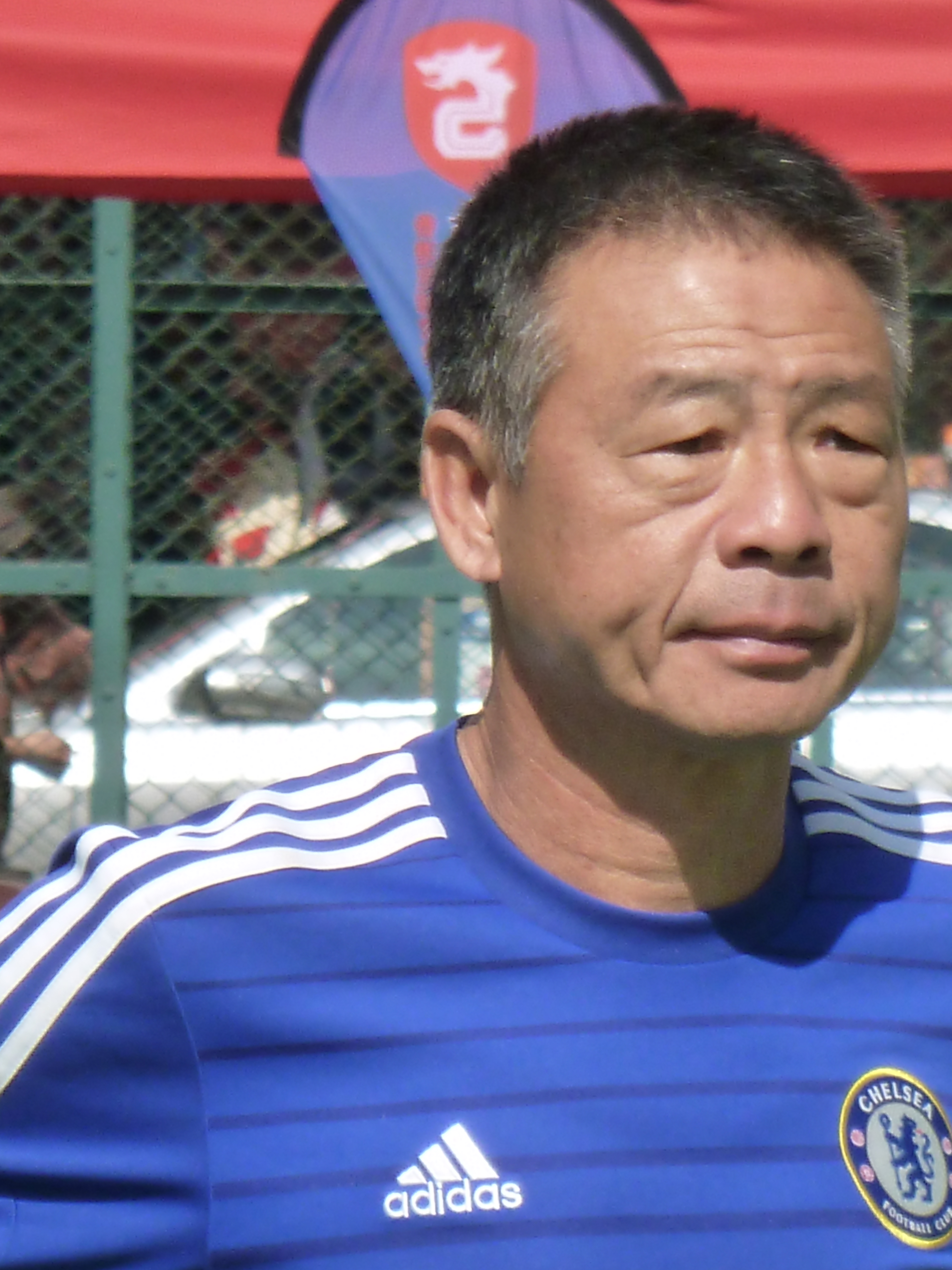
- Chan Fat Chi

Personal information
- Full name: Chinese: 陳發枝; Jyutping: can^{4} faat^{3} zi^{1}
- Date of birth: 10 February 1957 (age 69)
- Place of birth: Hong Kong
- Position: Defender

Senior career*
| Years | Team | Apps | (Gls) |
| 1975–1980 | Yuen Long | | |
| 1980–1984 | Bulova | | |
| 1984–1986 | Seiko | | |
| 1986–1991 | South China | | |
| 1991–1996 | Insta-Dict | | |

International career
| 1977–1989 | Hong Kong | 50 | (7) |

Managerial career
- 2013–?: Sun Hei SC
- * Club domestic league appearances and goals

Chan Fat Chi (Chinese: 陳發枝; Jyutping: can^{4} faat^{3} zi^{1}, born 10 January 1957) is a former Hong Kong professional footballer who played as a forward.

== Career ==
He played for Bulova, Seiko, South China and Instant-Dict. He was the Hong Kong Footballer of the Year in 1988 and 1989. He played in the famous Hong Kong victory over China on 19 May 1985.
