= Rezal Hassan =

Singaporean footballer

Personal information
- Full name: Mohamed Rezal Bin Hassan
- Date of birth: 14 February 1975 (age 51)
- Place of birth: Singapore
- Height: 1.83 m (6 ft 0 in)
- Position: Goalkeeper

Team information
- Current team: Geylang International (Goalkeeper Coach)

Senior career*
Years	Team	Apps	(Gls)
1996–2004	Singapore Armed Forces FC	216	(0)
2004–2009	Tampines Rovers	144	(0)
2009–2010	Woodlands Wellington	24	(0)
2010–2013	Singapore Armed Forces FC	96	(0)
Total		480	(0)

International career
1997–2003	Singapore	60	(0)

Managerial career
- 2013: Hougang United (goalkeeper coach)
- 2023–: Geylang International (goalkeeper coach)
- * Club domestic league appearances and goals

Mohamed Rezal bin Hassan (born 14 February 1975) is a retired Singaporean football goalkeeper. He played for the Singapore national team in the late-1990s and early-2000s, and was part of the Singapore team which won the regional AFF Championship in 1998. He is currently the goalkeeper coach for Singapore Premier League club Geylang International.

== Playing career ==
Rezal was a member of the Tampines Rovers teams which won the S.League title in 2004 and 2005, and the Singapore Cup in 2002, 2004 and 2006.

Rezal played in the Singapore national team's exhibition matches against Liverpool (2–0 defeat) and Manchester United (8–1 defeat) in 2001.

Rezal is the all-time top highest appearances for SAFFC with 312.

== Honours ==
=== Club ===
==== SAFFC ====
- S.League (4): 1997, 1998, 2000, 2002,
- Singapore Cup (1): 1997, 2012
- Singapore FA Cup (1): 1997

==== Tampines Rovers ====
- S.League (2): 2004, 2005
- Singapore Cup (2): 2004, 2006

=== International ===
==== Singapore ====
- AFF Championship: 1998
