= Zeng Xuelin =

Chinese footballer (1929–2016)

Zeng Xuelin 曾雪麟
Personal information
- Date of birth: 2 December 1929
- Place of birth: Siam
- Date of death: 11 February 2016 (aged 86)
- Place of death: Shenzhen, Guangdong, China
- Position: Goalkeeper

Senior career*
Years	Team	Apps	(Gls)
1949–1950	Guangzhou		
1951–1953	Southwest Military Region		
1954–1955	Bayi Football Team		
1955–1957	China PR White		
1957–1959	Tianjin		

International career
1955–1957	China PR White		

Managerial career
- 1959–1972: Tianjin
- 1972: Beijing Youth
- 1973–1982: Beijing
- 1983–1985: China PR
- 1998: Shenzhen Ping'an (caretaker)
Medal record
Men's football
Representing China (as manager)
AFC Asian Cup
Runner-up	1984
- * Club domestic league appearances and goals

Zeng Xuelin (Chinese: 曾雪麟; 2 December 1929 – 11 February 2016) was a Chinese football manager and player.

As a player he represented Guangzhou, Southwest Military Region, Bayi Football Team and Tianjin while internationally he played for what is now known as the China under-23 football team. After retiring as a player he moved into coaching where he had successful reigns at Tianjin and Beijing where he won several league titles before managing the China national team. After leaving the China national team he would mainly move away from management except for a brief spell when he joined Shenzhen Ping'an on a caretaker bases.

== Playing career ==
While Zeng Xuelin was born in Siam (now Thailand), he moved back with his family to China and settled in Meixian in the Guangdong Province at the age of seven. After finishing high school, he joined the Chinese People's Liberation Army and played for the Guangzhou Army team where he played amateur football in the regional leagues before going to university where he played for the Southwest Military Region football team while he was studying. As part of the Liberation Army he was selected for their top football club Bayi Football Team and studied football in Hungary. When his time ended with Bayi, he was selected to be a part of the China national white team (as Chinese B national team), which was allowed to participate in the league game during that time. In 1957, the White Team had moved to Tianjin, and eventually became Tianjin F.C.; he was the team captain for two seasons, and helped the team to win second place of the first Chinese National Games in 1959 before he officially retired.

== Managerial career ==
Before Xuelin retired from Tianjin he became the player-coach in February 1959, and officially became the team manager in 1960, where he achieved considerable success early within his reign when he won the 1960 Chinese Jia-A League league title and Chinese FA Cup in the same year. The club were constant title contenders throughout his reign despite seeing the Cultural Revolution severely stunting the team's development. Nevertheless, despite there not being any major tournaments held within China the club held on to Zeng when they also made him a consultant within the club. This lasted until 1972 when Beijing football club offered him the youth coach position before he would soon take over the senior side. Once again Zeng was quick to achieve success when he won the 1973 league title in his first season. He continued to make Beijing constant title contenders throughout his reign, which lasted close to ten years and despite not adding more silverware towards the club he would make sure his reign at the club would end on a high when the club won the 1982 league title before taking the China national football team management position. With the national team the team easily qualified for the 1984 AFC Asian Cup where he led the team to a runner-up position within the tournament. After a successful campaign the Chinese public were expecting more from the national team and after a good start in qualification for the 1986 FIFA World Cup the Chinese team were unexpected knocked out from qualification when they lost to Hong Kong who beat them 2-1 on 19 March 1985 in a game that would see Zeng fired.

== Death ==
On 11 February 2016, Zeng died at his home in Shenzhen, aged 86.

== Honours ==
=== Manager ===
Tianjin

- Chinese Jia-A League: 1960

Beijing

- Chinese Jia-A League: 1973, 1982
