= Mirko Grabovac =

Singaporean footballer

Personal information
- Full name: Mirko Grabovac
- Date of birth: 19 September 1971 (age 55)
- Place of birth: Stobreč, SR Croatia, Yugoslavia
- Height: 1.83 m (6 ft 0 in)
- Position: Striker

Senior career*
Years	Team	Apps	(Gls)
1993–1995	Primorac	53	(9)
1995–1996	Cibalia	20	(1)
1996–1997	Zadarkomerc	11	(1)
1997–1999	Primorac	33	(10)
1999–2003	Singapore Armed Forces	137	(143)
2004–2007	Tampines Rovers	100	(83)
2008	Sengkang Punggol	2	(0)

International career^{‡}
2001–2008	Singapore	12	(0)

Managerial career
- 2008: Sengkang Punggol (caretaker)
- 2009: Mosor
- 2009–2013: Imotski
- 2013–2015: Mosor
- 2015-2016: Omiš
- 2017: Junak Sinj
- 2018: Warriors
- * Club domestic league appearances and goals as of 24 May 2009 ‡ National team caps and goals as of 24 May 2009

Mirko Grabovac (born 19 September 1971) is a professional football coach and former player. Born in Croatia, he played for the Singapore national team.

== Playing career ==
=== Club ===
Grabovac was the top scorer in Singapore's S.League in 1999, 2000, 2001 and 2002 while playing for the Singapore Armed Forces, and again in 2005 playing for Tampines Rovers. He was named the S.League's Player of the Year in 2000.

With SAFFC, he scored a total of 150 S.League goals in five seasons along with seven goals in Asian competitions.

In 2007, he scored his 240th S.League goal in the Singapore Cup semi-final against Bangkok University to overtake Egmar Goncalves as the all-time S.League top goalscorer.

A year later, Grabovac was hired by Sengkang Punggol as a player-coach under head coach Saswadimata Dasuki. He served as caretaker coach for the Dolphins for a short period, starting with a 1–0 win over Gombak United which was Sengkang's second victory of the season. Grabovac stepped down two months later as Swandi Ahmad was put in charge of the squad.

He decided to leave Singapore on 5 October 2008 to rejoin his family in his native Croatia, renouncing his citizenship as well.

== Managerial career ==
Grabovac started coaching in his native Croatia in 2009, taking charge of Mosor, replacing Davor Mladina. He then joined Imotski in the same year, and coached them for three years. He then returned to Mosor and coached them for a further four years. He was named manager of Omiš in June 2015 and was sacked in October 2016.

He succeeded Dragutin Ćelić at Junak Sinj in March 2017, but was dismissed as manager of Junak in January 2018

In early 2018, Grabovac was announced as the new head coach of his former club Warriors, marking his return to his former adopted nation in a footballing capacity since he renounced his Singaporean citizenship. The appointment was met with disapproval by Singaporean footballing fans and communities because of his citizenship issue. He received his permit to coach Warriors from the authorities in March 2018. His time with Warriors was a disappointing one, finishing in fifth in the 2019 Singapore Premier League. His contract was not renewed beyond the season.

== Honours ==
=== Club ===
==== Singapore Armed Forces ====
- S.League: 2000, 2002
- Singapore Cup: 1999

==== Tampines Rovers ====
- S.League: 2004, 2005
- Singapore Cup: 2004, 2006
- ASEAN Club Championship: 2005

=== Individual ===
- S.League Player of the Year: 2000
- S.League Top Scorer: 1999, 2000, 2001, 2002, 2005
- S.League Player of Decade
- 244 S.League Goals
