= D. Surendran =

Malaysian footballer (born 1980)

Davaghan Surendran
Personal information
- Full name: Surendran a/l Davaghan
- Date of birth: 16 April 1980 (age 46)
- Place of birth: Petaling Jaya, Selangor, Malaysia
- Height: 1.78 m (5 ft 10 in)
- Positions: Defender; midfielder

Youth career
- 1996–1998: Selangor FA President Cup

Senior career*
Years	Team	Apps	(Gls)
1999–2011	Selangor FA	91	(17)

International career^{‡}
2004–2005	Malaysia	5	(0)
- * Club domestic league appearances and goals as of 24 July 2011 ‡ National team caps and goals as of 24 July 2011

Davaghan Surendran (born 16 April 1980 in Selangor, Malaysia) is a former Malaysian footballer.

== Career ==
He has spent his entire career with Selangor FA since breaking into the senior team in 1999. Surendran can play as a defender and midfielder, at the right area.

Among the best moment of his career is scoring the golden goal in extra time to win the 2001 Malaysia FA Cup final for Selangor against Sarawak FA. He was also part of Selangor team that won the domestic double in 2005 and domestic treble in 2009.

He left Selangor when his contract was not renewed beyond 2011.

== National team ==
Surendran represented Malaysia in international tournaments. He played at the 2004 Tiger Cup, as well as some 2006 FIFA World Cup qualification matches.
