= Lionel Lewis =

Singaporean footballer

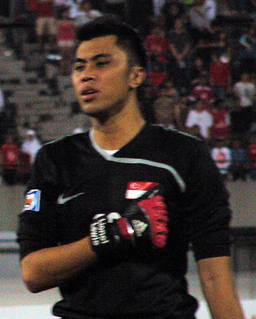

Personal information
- Date of birth: 16 December 1982 (age 43)
- Place of birth: Singapore
- Height: 1.88 m (6 ft 2 in)
- Position: Goalkeeper

Youth career
- National Football Academy

Senior career*
Years	Team	Apps	(Gls)
2001–2002	Geylang United	60	(0)
2003–2005	Young Lions	45	(0)
2005–2012	Home United	104	(0)
Total		209	(0)

International career
2002–2011	Singapore	73	(0)
- * Club domestic league appearances and goals

Lionel Lewis (born 16 December 1982) is a Singaporean former footballer who last played for Singapore national football team as a goalkeeper. He played for Home United from 2004 to 2012, having played for Geylang United and the Young Lions in his earlier years. Lewis made his international debut in 2002 and made 73 appearances for the Singapore national football team. He was named the 2004 Tiger Cup MVP, and was nominated for the 2006 Asian Footballer of the Year award. After his retirement from professional football he has worked for Nanyang Polytechnic managing student sports.

== Club career ==
Lewis first played for Geylang United, and is recognised as one of an outstanding trio of keepers – the other two being Shahril Jantan and Hassan Sunny – that have turned out for the club. After a brief career at Geylang, where he made a total of 60 appearances, he joined the Young Lions to become part of the first Young Lions side to play in the S.League in 2003. In August 2004, the police regular joined Home United (which is affiliated to the Singapore Police Force) on a short-term contract and played for the Protectors in their AFC Cup campaign, before returning to the Young Lions. He made a return to Home United in 2005, where he has remained until the end of his career.

Lewis has been cited as the difference between Home United and the other teams. Balestier Khalsa coach, Abdul Karim Razzak, described him as "a goalkeeper that can win 20 points for his team in a season".

In December 2007, Lewis trained with Premier League club Manchester City. One week later, on 28 December 2007, Sven-Göran Eriksson decided not to sign Lewis due to difficulties getting a work permit for him. On 13 January 2008, he underwent a one-week trial at Swiss Super League club Grasshopper Club Zürich and was offered a contract. On 22 January, Lewis confirmed with S-League that he would not be signing a contract with Grasshopper.

Lionel retired from professional football at the end of 2012 season, at the age of 29.

== International career ==
A teenage Lionel Lewis was touted by former Singapore coach Vincent Subramaniam as a future international, and the lanky keeper fulfilled those expectations with his progression into the senior squad. Lewis, who has a huge following, made his senior debut for the Singapore national team in a 2–0 friendly win over the Maldives on 9 April 2002. However, he only managed to grab the "No. 18" jersey from fellow keeper Hassan Sunny in 2004 and since then, he has regularly kept goal for the country in international tournaments.

He represented the Singapore national team in the Tiger Cup, South-east Asia's premier football tournament. He made his name in Tiger Cup 2004, when his impeccable performances between the sticks helped Singapore to a memorable triumph. He was subsequently named the tournament's MVP for his performance during the Cup. Lewis has played in three SEA Games, in 2001, 2003 and 2005. Lewis was nominated for the prestigious 2006 Asian Footballer of the Year award, making him the only ASEAN player and only goalkeeper among the nominees and the first Singapore nominee in the award's history.

While playing for Singapore in the 2006 King's Cup against Thailand, he was knocked unconscious after a clash with Thai forward, Kiatisuk Senamuang. A post-match medical report indicated that the injury was not serious.

== Personal life ==
A graduate of Nanyang Polytechnic, Lewis later studied at Novation Business School in 2005. He graduated with an advanced diploma certificate in Sports and Leisure Management. In 2008, Lewis completed his degree in Sports Management from University of Wolverhampton. Lewis currently works at the Nanyang Polytechnic Student Affair Office.

Lewis is married to Jenny Lam, a former flight stewardess. Together they have a daughter and a son.

== Endorsements ==
In 2010, Lionel signed a contract with Puma, after previously being sponsored by Adidas.

Lionel's partnership with YEO’S blossomed over the years and soon he became the ambassador of H-TWO-O and has been actively involved in their advertising campaigns. He is the first S.League player to be featured in a TV commercial which was produced outside of Singapore.

Lionel is also one of the brand ambassadors of Europe's leading sports nutrition company, Maximuscle, here in Singapore.

== Honours ==
=== Club ===
Geylang United

- S.League: 2001

Home United

- Singapore Cup: 2005, 2011

=== International ===
Singapore

- ASEAN Football Championship: 2004, 2007

=== Individual ===
- Tiger Cup MVP: 2004
