= Football Association of Selangor =

Professional football club based in Shah Alam, Selangor, Malaysia

Football Association of Selangor Persatuan Bola Sepak Selangor ڤرساتوان بولا سيڤق سلاڠور 雪兰莪足协 சிலாங்கூர் கால்பந்து சங்கம்
- Founded: 6 May 1906; 120 years ago (unofficial) as Selangor Association Football League; 22 February 1936; 90 years ago, as Football Association of Selangor
- Headquarters: SUK Sports Complex, Persiaran Raja Muda, Seksyen 5, Shah Alam, 40000
- Location: Shah Alam, Selangor, Malaysia
- President: Tengku Amir Shah
- Website: Official website

The Football Association of Selangor (Malay: Persatuan Bola Sepak Selangor), also known as FAS, is the governing body of football for the state of Selangor, Malaysia.

== History ==
The FAS was formed by the amalgamation in 1936 between the Selangor Football Association and the Selangor Association Football League.

== Administration ==
The FAS mission is governing grassroots, community, social, amateur, and semi-pro football across a broad spectrum of players, officials, parents, and supporters.

== Executive committee ==
Position	Name
President	(Malaysia) Tengku Amir Shah
Deputy president	(Malaysia) Shahril Mokhtar
Vice president	(Malaysia) Abdul Rauf Ahmad
Vice president	(Malaysia) Palanisamy Karuppan
Vice president	(Malaysia) Mohd Izhar Moslim
Vice president	(Malaysia) Johan Kamal Hamidon
General secretary	(Malaysia) Izrin Nabil
Assistant secretary	(Malaysia) Amir Shariffuddin Samat
Assistant secretary II	(Malaysia) Abdul Afiq Abdul Halim
Treasurer	(Malaysia) Sivasundaram Sithamparam Pillai
Assistant tresurer	(Malaysia) Ariffin Abdul Hamid
Members	(Malaysia) Sivasundaram Sithamparam Pillai
Members	(Malaysia) Razak Abdul Karim
Members	(Malaysia) Sathanaraju Kolandasamy
Members	(Malaysia) Shahrizal Sahri
Members	(Malaysia) Sekar Chandran Ramachandran
Members	(Malaysia) Mustaza Ahmad
Members	(Malaysia) Omar Ali
Members	(Malaysia) Ariffin Abd Hamid
Members	(Malaysia) Sugumaran Parthasaraty
Members	(Malaysia) Simon Lim Swee Teck
Members	(Malaysia) Md Yunus Iskandar Noor
Members	(Malaysia) Nazzab Hidzan
Members	(Malaysia) Sanbagamaran Kalasigaram

== Former presidents ==
Name	Period
(United Kingdom) CP Rawson	1949–50
(Malaysia) Tunku Abdul Rahman	1951
(Malaysia) SCE Singam	1952–53
(Malaysia) K Sundram	1954–60
(Malaysia) Harun Idris	1961–83
(Malaysia) Ahmad Razali Mohd Ali	1984–89
(Malaysia) Muhammad Muhammad Taib	1990–95
(Malaysia) Mohd Aini Taib	1996–00
(Malaysia) Sharafuddin Idris Shah	2000
(Malaysia) Tengku Ahmad Shah	2001–04
(Malaysia) Khir Toyo	2005–07
(Malaysia) Khalid Ibrahim	2008–14
(Malaysia) Azmin Ali	2015–17
(Malaysia) Subahan Kamal	2017–2018
(Malaysia) Tengku Amir Shah	2018–present

== Competitions ==
The Football Association of Selangor has organized the following club competitions:

- FAS Super League
- FAS Premier League
- FAS Division 1 League
- FAS Division 2 League
- Selangor Champions League
- FAS FA Cup
- FAS Charity Cup
- FAS Women's Super League
- FAS U-20 Youth League
- FAS U-19 Youth League
- FAS U-17 Junior League
- FAS U-16 Junior League
- FAS U-15 Junior League
- FAS U-14 Junior League
- FAS U-12 Junior League
- FAS U-10 Junior League
- FAS U-8 Junior League
- FAS Foundation League

== District Football Associations ==
There are 9 football associations affiliated to the FAS.

- Gombak FA
- Klang FA
- Sepang FA
- Petaling FA
- Kuala Selangor FA
- Hulu Selangor FA
- Kuala Langat FA
- Hulu Langat FA
- Sabak Bernam FA

=== Leagues ===
Men's

- Klang Valley League Shah Alam
- Klang Valley League UM Park
- Klang Valley League Cyberjaya
- Klang Valley League City Centre
- Klang Valley League Gombak
- Kota Damansara Premier League
- Puchong Community League
- Setia Alam Football League
- Selangor Social Premier League
- DACS Social League
- The District Social League
- Frenzz League
- Futbola Social League
- Klang League
- Isma Community League
- Shah Alam Social League
- RF Social League
- Ryders Super League
- Selangor Varsity Social League
- South Selangor League
- Sportster Premier League
- Sunarize Social League
- Sungai Buloh Community League
- The Pit League
- Prestige Cup
- Setia Alam Cup

Ladies and girls

- FAS Women's Super League

Youth

- FAS U-20 Youth League
- FAS U-19 Youth League
- FAS U-17 Junior League
- FAS U-16 Junior League
- FAS U-15 Junior League
- FAS U-14 Junior League
- FAS U-12 Junior League
- FAS U-10 Junior League
- FAS U-8 Junior League

Special league

- FAS Foundation League

== See also ==
- Malaysia Super League
- Malaysia Cup
- Malaysia FA Cup
- Sultan of Selangor Cup
- History of Malaysian football
