= Guangdong–Hong Kong Cup =

Hong Kong–Guangdong Cup
- Organiser(s): Hong Kong Football Association
- Founded: January 1979; 47 years ago
- Region: International
- Teams: 2
- Most championships: Guangdong (27 wins)
- 44th Guangdong–Hong Kong Cup

The Guangdong–Hong Kong Cup (simplified Chinese: 省港杯; traditional Chinese: 省港盃) is a football competition between two teams representing Hong Kong and Guangdong Province of China respectively. It was established in 1979.

== History ==
In April 1977, the Guangdong team visited Hong Kong for the first time and played two friendly matches. Within its staying period, the officials of Guangdong and Hong Kong football started a discussion on the possibility of establishing an annual competition between them.

In June 1978, the Hong Kong national football team visited China and finished its trip with a match against the Guangdong team. HKFA chairman Hui Chun Fui and the official in Guangdong then reached a basic agreement of having a competition between the teams again next year.

On 7 December 1978, the contract of establishing Guangdong–Hong Kong Cup was signed. The first competition started on 21 January 1979.

== Milestones ==
- 1979 (1st) – The first Guangdong–Hong Kong Cup concluded with the Guangdong team winning 4–1.
- 1982 (4th) – The first time Hong Kong's team included foreign players. Extra time was the first used to decide the winner.
- 1983 (5th) – The first time the result was decided by penalty shootout.
- 1989 (11th) – The Hong Kong team came back from a 3-goal deficit win 4–3 and ended six consecutive wins for Guangdong.
- 1990 (12th) – The first Hong Kong consecutive victory.
- 1993 (15th) – Ross Greer's goal at 1:48 was the quickest goal in the competition's history.
- 1994 (16th) – The Chinese Jia A League was established. For the first time, Guangdong team included players from outside Guangdong (Xu Hong, Fan Zhiyi and Su Maozhen). Fan Zhiyi was sent off during extra time of the second match. He was the first player to be sent off in the competition's history.
- 1995 (17th) – The rule of "registering a maximum of 4 foreign players, a maximum of 3 players used" was established.
- 1999 (21st) – No maximum limit of foreign players to be used in the competition was established.
- 2003 (25th) – Each team was allowed to register a maximum of 5 foreign players, among which only 3 could be played in the match at the same time.
- 2007 (29th) – The Guangdong match was played in Panyu Fo Ying Dong Stadium in remembrance of the death of Henry Fok, who established the Cup in 1979; Panyu is the home town of Fok.

== Format ==
The competition is played every year. It is a two-leg competition where each team plays a home match once. The champion is decided by combining the results of both games.

== Past winners ==
Edition	Date	Home team	Score	Away team	Venue	Attendance
1	21 January 1979	Guangdong	1–0	Hong Kong	Yuexiushan Stadium, Guangzhou	
1	28 January 1979	Hong Kong	1–3	Guangdong	Government Stadium, Hong Kong	15,000
1	Guangdong won by an aggregate 4–1					
2	30 December 1979	Hong Kong	1–0	Guangdong	Government Stadium, Hong Kong	
2	13 January 1980	Guangdong	0–0	Hong Kong	Yuexiushan Stadium, Guangzhou	
2	Hong Kong won by an aggregate 1–0.					
3	18 January 1981	Guangdong	0–0	Hong Kong	Guangzhou, Guangdong	
3	22 January 1981	Hong Kong	0–1	Guangdong	Government Stadium, Hong Kong	
3	Guangdong won by an aggregate 1–0.					
4	3 January 1982	Hong Kong	1–1	Guangdong	Government Stadium, Hong Kong	
4	12 January 1982	Guangdong	1–2 (a.e.t.)	Hong Kong	Guangdong People's Stadium, Guangzhou	
4	Hong Kong won by an aggregate 3–2 after extra time.					
5	25 January 1983	Guangdong	1–1	Hong Kong	Guangdong People's Stadium, Guangzhou	
5	30 January 1983	Hong Kong	0–0 (a.e.t.); 3–4 (pen.)	Guangdong	Government Stadium, Hong Kong	
5	Guangdong won 5–4 on penalty shootout. (aggregate 1–1).					
6	1 January 1984	Guangdong	1–0	Hong Kong	Guangdong People's Stadium, Guangzhou	
6	5 January 1984	Hong Kong	0–0	Guangdong	Government Stadium, Hong Kong	
6	Guangdong won by an aggregate 1–0.					
7	3 January 1985	Guangdong	2–1	Hong Kong	Guangdong People's Stadium, Guangzhou	
7	January 1985	Hong Kong	0–1	Guangdong	Government Stadium, Hong Kong	
7	Guangdong won by an aggregate 3–1.					
8	5 January 1986	Guangdong	2–1	Hong Kong	Guangdong People's Stadium, Guangzhou	
8	9 January 1986	Hong Kong	0–1	Guangdong	Government Stadium, Hong Kong	
8	Guangdong won by an aggregate 3–1.					
9	31 December 1986	Guangdong	1–0	Hong Kong	Guangdong People's Stadium, Guangzhou	
9	4 January 1987	Hong Kong	0–1 (a.e.t.); 3–4 (pen.)	Guangdong	Government Stadium, Hong Kong	
9	Guangdong won 5–4 on penalty shootout. (aggregate 1–1).					
10	3 January 1988	Guangdong	0–0	Hong Kong	Guangdong People's Stadium, Guangzhou	
10	9 January 1988	Hong Kong	0–3	Guangdong	Government Stadium, Hong Kong	
10	Guangdong won by an aggregate 3–0.					
11	24 December 1988	Guangdong	1–0	Hong Kong	Guangdong People's Stadium, Guangzhou	
11	1 January 1989	Hong Kong	4–2	Guangdong	Government Stadium, Hong Kong	
11	Hong Kong won by an aggregate 4–3.					
12	6 January 1990	Hong Kong	0–1	Guangdong	Government Stadium, Hong Kong	
12	13 January 1990	Guangdong	0–2	Hong Kong	Guangdong People's Stadium, Guangzhou	
12	Hong Kong won by an aggregate 2–1					
13	19 January 1991	Guangdong	4–0	Hong Kong	Guangdong People's Stadium, Guangzhou	
13	26 January 1991	Hong Kong	1–2	Guangdong	Government Stadium, Hong Kong	
13	Guangdong won by an aggregate 6–1.					
14	9 January 1992	Guangdong	1–0	Hong Kong	Guangdong People's Stadium, Guangzhou	
14	18 January 1992	Hong Kong	1–2	Guangdong	Government Stadium, Hong Kong	
14	Guangdong won by an aggregate 3–1.					
15	3 January 1993	Hong Kong	1–1	Guangdong	Mong Kok Stadium, Hong Kong	
15	10 January 1993	Guangdong	0–2	Hong Kong	Guangdong People's Stadium, Guangzhou	
15	Hong Kong won by an aggregate 2–1.					
16	9 January 1994	Hong Kong	2–0	Guangdong	Mong Kok Stadium, Hong Kong	
16	January 1994	Guangdong	3–1 (a.e.t.); 5–4 (pen.)	Hong Kong	Guangdong People's Stadium, Guangzhou	
16	Guangdong won by 5–4 on penalty shootout. (aggregate 3–3).					
17	1 January 1995	Guangdong	2–0	Hong Kong	Guangdong People's Stadium, Guangzhou	
17	8 January 1995	Hong Kong	0–2	Guangdong	Hong Kong Stadium, Hong Kong	
17	Guangdong won by an aggregate 4–0.					
18	31 December 1995	Guangdong	4–1	Hong Kong	Guangdong People's Stadium, Guangzhou	
18	4 January 1996	Hong Kong	0–4	Guangdong	Hong Kong Stadium, Hong Kong	
18	Guangdong won by an aggregate 8–1.					
19	29 December 1996	Guangdong	3–0	Hong Kong	Guangdong People's Stadium, Guangzhou	
19	5 January 1997	Hong Kong	2–1	Guangdong	Hong Kong Stadium, Hong Kong	
19	Guangdong won by an aggregate 4–2.					
20	11 January 1998	Guangdong	1–0	Hong Kong	Guangdong People's Stadium, Guangzhou	
20	17 January 1998	Hong Kong	1–1	Guangdong	Hong Kong Stadium, Hong Kong	
20	Guangdong won by an aggregate 2–1.					
21	3 January 1999	Guangdong	1–0	Hong Kong	Guangdong People's Stadium, Guangzhou	
21	10 January 1999	Hong Kong	1–1	Guangdong	Hong Kong Stadium, Hong Kong	
21	Guangdong won by an aggregate 2–1.					
22	2 January 2000	Guangdong	0–1	Hong Kong	Guangdong People's Stadium, Guangzhou	
22	9 January 2000	Hong Kong	1–1	Guangdong	Hong Kong Stadium, Hong Kong	
22	Hong Kong won by an aggregate 2–1.					
23	7 January 2001	Guangdong	2–2	Hong Kong	Guangdong People's Stadium, Guangzhou	
23	13 January 2001	Hong Kong	1–0	Guangdong	Hong Kong Stadium, Hong Kong	
23	Hong Kong won by an aggregate 3–2.					
24	30 December 2001	Hong Kong	3–1	Guangdong	Hong Kong Stadium, Hong Kong	
24	6 January 2002	Guangdong	1–0	Hong Kong	Guangdong People's Stadium, Guangzhou	
24	Hong Kong won by an aggregate 3–2.					
25	29 December 2002	Guangdong	2–0	Hong Kong	Guangdong People's Stadium, Guangzhou	
25	5 January 2003	Hong Kong	1–2	Guangdong	Hong Kong Stadium, Hong Kong	2,761
25	Guangdong won by an aggregate 4–1.					
26	28 December 2003	Hong Kong	2–1	Guangdong	Hong Kong Stadium, Hong Kong	
26	5 January 2004	Guangdong	0–0	Hong Kong	Guangdong People's Stadium, Guangzhou	
26	Hong Kong won by an aggregate 2–1.					
27	2 January 2005	Guangdong	0–2	Hong Kong	Guangdong People's Stadium, Guangzhou	
27	9 January 2005	Hong Kong	2–2	Guangdong	Hong Kong Stadium, Hong Kong	16,006
27	Hong Kong won by an aggregate 4–2.					
28	31 December 2005	Hong Kong	1–0	Guangdong	Mong Kok Stadium, Hong Kong	2,611
28	8 January 2006	Guangdong	2–0	Hong Kong	Guangdong People's Stadium, Guangzhou	
28	Guangdong won by an aggregate 2–1.					
29	30 December 2006	Guangdong	1–0	Hong Kong	Yingdong Stadium, Guangzhou	
29	7 January 2007	Hong Kong	4–2 (a.e.t.)	Guangdong	Hong Kong Stadium, Hong Kong	2,488
29	Hong Kong won by an aggregate 4–3 after extra time.					
30	30 December 2007	Hong Kong	3–0	Guangdong	Hong Kong Stadium, Hong Kong	3,516
30	7 January 2008	Guangdong	0–1	Hong Kong	Century Lotus Stadium, Foshan	
30	Hong Kong won by an aggregate 4–0.					
31	1 January 2009	Guangdong	3–1	Hong Kong	Yuexiushan Stadium, Guangzhou	18,000
31	4 January 2009	Hong Kong	4–1 (a.e.t.)	Guangdong	Mong Kok Stadium, Hong Kong	3,395
31	Hong Kong won by an aggregate 5–4 after extra time.					
32	29 December 2009	Hong Kong	2–1	Guangdong	Siu Sai Wan Sports Ground, Hong Kong	1,603
32	2 January 2010	Guangdong	2–0	Hong Kong	Zhaoqing Sports Center, Zhaoqing	2,000
32	Guangdong won by an aggregate 3–2.					
33	1 January 2011	Guangdong	3–1	Hong Kong	Guangdong People's Stadium, Guangzhou	8,000
33	4 January 2011	Hong Kong	1–1	Guangdong	Hong Kong Stadium, Hong Kong	3,175
33	Guangdong won by an aggregate 4–2.					
34	28 December 2011	Hong Kong	2–2	Guangdong	Hong Kong Stadium, Hong Kong	4,165
34	1 January 2012	Guangdong	0–0 (a.e.t.); 4–5 (pen.)	Hong Kong	Huizhou Olympic Stadium, Huizhou	30,000
34	Hong Kong won 5–4 on penalty shootout. (aggregate 2–2).					
35	29 December 2012	Guangdong	1–0	Hong Kong	Huizhou Olympic Stadium, Huizhou	
35	1 January 2013	Hong Kong	2–1 (a.e.t.); 9–8 (pen.)	Guangdong	Mong Kok Stadium, Hong Kong	4,587
35	Hong Kong won 9–8 on penalty shootout. (aggregate 2–2).					
36	29 December 2013	Hong Kong	2–3	Guangdong	Mong Kok Stadium, Hong Kong	3,502
36	1 January 2014	Guangdong	3–2	Hong Kong	Huizhou Olympic Stadium, Huizhou	40,000
36	Guangdong won by an aggregate 6–4.					
37	31 December 2014	Guangdong	1–0	Hong Kong	Huizhou Olympic Stadium, Huizhou	
37	4 January 2015	Hong Kong	0–0	Guangdong	Mong Kok Stadium, Hong Kong	3,779
37	Guangdong won by an aggregate 1–0.					
38	31 December 2015	Hong Kong	1–1	Guangdong	Mong Kok Stadium, Hong Kong	4,273
38	3 January 2016	Guangdong	4–3	Hong Kong	Guangdong Provincial People's Stadium, Guangzhou	
38	Guangdong won by an aggregate 5–4.					
39	1 January 2017	Guangdong	3–2	Hong Kong	Guangdong Provincial People's Stadium, Guangzhou	
39	4 January 2017	Hong Kong	1–1	Guangdong	Hong Kong Stadium, Hong Kong	4,272
39	Guangdong won by an aggregate 4–3.					
40	4 January 2018	Hong Kong	2–0	Guangdong	Hong Kong Stadium, Hong Kong	5,341
40	7 January 2018	Guangdong	2–0 (a.e.t.); 2–4 (pen.)	Hong Kong	Guangdong Provincial People's Stadium, Guangzhou	
40	Hong Kong won 4–2 on penalty shootout. (aggregate 2–2).					
41	6 January 2019	Guangdong	2–1	Hong Kong	Guangdong Provincial People's Stadium, Guangzhou	
41	9 January 2019	Hong Kong	4–0	Guangdong	Hong Kong Stadium, Hong Kong	4,096
41	Hong Kong won by an aggregate 5–2.					
42	31 January 2024	Hong Kong	2–0	Guangdong	Mong Kok Stadium, Hong Kong	5,067
42	7 February 2024	Guangdong	3–1	Hong Kong	Yuexiushan Stadium, Guangzhou	7,288
42	Guangdong won 4–2 on penalty shootout. (aggregate 3–3).					
43	15 January 2025	Guangdong	1–1	Hong Kong	Yuexiushan Stadium, Guangzhou	
43	22 January 2025	Hong Kong	1–2	Guangdong	Hong Kong Stadium, Hong Kong	8,278
43	Guangdong won by an aggregate 3–2.					
44	28 December 2025	Hong Kong	2–2	Guangdong	Hong Kong Stadium, Hong Kong	7,703
44	3 January 2026	Guangdong	2–2	Hong Kong	Greater Bay Area Sports Center, Guangzhou	
44	Guangdong won 4–3 on penalty shootout. (aggregate 4–4).					

== Winners table ==
Rank	Team	Winners
1st	Guangdong	27
2nd	Hong Kong	17
