= 2005 Lunar New Year Cup =

Tournament details
- Host country: Hong Kong
- Dates: 25 January
- Teams: 2
- Venue: 1 (in 1 host city)

Final positions
- Champions: Brazil (1st title)

Tournament statistics
- Matches played: 1
- Goals scored: 8 (8 per match)
- Top scorer: (Brazil) Ricardo Oliveira (2 goals)

The 2005 Lunar New Year Cup (also known as Carlsberg Cup for sponsorship reasons) was a football tournament held in Hong Kong on 25 January 2005, the first day of the Chinese New Year 2005.

== Participating teams ==
- Brazil (first appearance)
- Hong Kong (host)

== Squads ==
=== Brazil ===
Head coach: Carlos Alberto Parreira

No.	Pos.	Player	Date of birth (age)	Caps	Club
1	GK	Júlio César	3 September 1979 (aged 25)		(Italy) Chievo
2	DF	Cafu	7 June 1970 (aged 34)		(Italy) Milan
3	DF	Lúcio	8 May 1978 (aged 26)		(Germany) Bayern Munich
4	DF	Juan	1 February 1979 (aged 26)		(Germany) Bayer Leverkusen
5	MF	Emerson	4 April 1976 (aged 28)		(Italy) Juventus
6	DF	Roberto Carlos	10 April 1973 (aged 31)		(Spain) Real Madrid
7	FW	Robinho	25 January 1984 (aged 21)		(Brazil) Santos
8	MF	Juninho	30 January 1975 (aged 30)		(France) Lyon
9	FW	Ricardo Oliveira	6 May 1980 (aged 24)		(Spain) Real Betis
10	FW	Ronaldinho	21 March 1980 (aged 24)		(Spain) Barcelona
11	MF	Zé Roberto	6 July 1974 (aged 30)		(Germany) Bayern Munich
13	DF	Juliano Belletti	20 June 1976 (aged 28)		(Spain) Barcelona
16	DF	Gilberto	25 April 1976 (aged 28)		(Germany) Hertha BSC
17	DF	Elano	14 June 1981 (aged 23)		(Brazil) Santos
18	MF	Júlio Baptista	1 October 1981 (aged 23)		(Spain) Sevilla
19	MF	Renato	15 May 1979 (aged 25)		(Spain) Sevilla
21	MF	Alex	14 September 1977 (aged 27)		(Turkey) Fenerbahçe
22	GK	Heurelho Gomes	15 February 1981 (aged 23)		(Netherlands) PSV
23	DF	Luisão	13 February 1981 (aged 23)		(Portugal) Benfica
24	DF	Anderson	27 April 1980 (aged 24)		(Brazil) Corinthians
25	MF	Diego	28 February 1984 (aged 20)		(Portugal) Porto

=== Hong Kong ===
Head coach: Lai Sun Cheung

No.	Pos.	Player	Date of birth (age)	Caps	Club
1	GK	Xiao Guoji	3 November 1978 (aged 26)		(Hong Kong) Kitchee
3	DF	Man Pei Tak	16 February 1982 (aged 22)		(Hong Kong) Buler Rangers
4	DF	Ng Wai Chiu	22 October 1981 (aged 23)		(China) Shanghai Zobon
6	MF	Lau Chi Keung	7 January 1977 (aged 28)		(Hong Kong) Sun Hei
7	FW	Au Wai Lun	14 August 1971 (aged 33)		(Hong Kong) South China
8	MF	Cheung Sai Ho	27 August 1975 (aged 29)		(Hong Kong) Happy Valley
9	FW	Chan Siu Ki	14 July 1985 (aged 19)		(Hong Kong) Kitchee
10	MF	Lee Sze Ming	5 February 1979 (aged 26)		(Hong Kong) Happy Valley
11	FW	Law Chun Bong	25 January 1981 (aged 24)		(Hong Kong) South China
12	MF	Wong Chun Yue	28 January 1978 (aged 27)		(Hong Kong) Sun Hei
13	MF	Szeto Man Chun	5 June 1975 (aged 29)		(Hong Kong) Kitchee
16	DF	Luk Koon Pong	1 August 1978 (aged 26)		(Hong Kong) South China
18	DF	Lee Wai Man	18 August 1973 (aged 31)		(Hong Kong) Happy Valley
19	GK	Fan Chun Yip	1 May 1976 (aged 28)		(Hong Kong) Happy Valley
20	DF	Poon Yiu Cheuk	19 September 1977 (aged 27)		(Hong Kong) Happy Valley
23	MF	Chu Siu Kei	11 January 1980 (aged 25)		(Hong Kong) Sun Hei
25	DF	Feng Jizhi	11 November 1976 (aged 28)		(Hong Kong) South China
30	MF	Poon Man Tik	24 February 1975 (aged 29)		(Hong Kong) Sun Hei
32	MF	Li Chun Yip	18 September 1981 (aged 23)		(Hong Kong) Happy Valley
37	FW	Sham Kwok Keung	10 September 1985 (aged 19)		(Hong Kong) Happy Valley
43	MF	Lam Ka Wai	5 June 1985 (aged 19)		(Hong Kong) Buler Rangers
44	FW	Chan Ho Man	14 May 1980 (aged 24)		(Hong Kong) Sun Hei

== Results ==
All times given in Hong Kong Time (UTC+8).

2005-01-25
17:00

Hong Kong	1–7	Brazil
Lee Sze Ming 86'		Lúcio 21'; Roberto Carlos 30'; Ricardo Oliveira 45', 58'; Ronaldinho 50'; Robinho 78'; Alex 79' (pen.)

Hong Kong Stadium, Hong Kong
Attendance: 23,425
Referee: Zhou Weixin (China)

Hong Kong	Brazil

2005 Carlsberg Cup champions

Brazil
First title

== Top scorers ==
2 goals

- (Brazil) Ricardo Oliveira

1 goal

- (Brazil) Alex
- (Brazil) Lúcio
- (Brazil) Roberto Carlos
- (Brazil) Robinho
- (Brazil) Ronaldinho
- (Hong Kong) Lee Sze Ming

== See also ==
- Hong Kong Football Association
- Hong Kong First Division League
