= 2006–07 Hong Kong League Cup =

Football league season

The Hong Kong League Cup 2006–07 is the 7th staging of the Hong Kong League Cup.

The competition started on 11 January 2007 with 10 Hong Kong First Division clubs and was concluded on 18 March 2007 with the final.

Kitchee regained their second consecutive League Cup champion by winning 2-1 against Happy Valley in the final. They also won a HKD$80,000 championship prize.

== Teams ==
- Citizen
- Happy Valley
- HKFC
- Hong Kong 08
- Rangers
- Kitchee
- Lanwa Redbull
- South China
- Wofoo Tai Po
- Xiangxue Sun Hei

== Details ==
- The 10 teams in Hong Kong First Division League is divided into groups A and B. Each team plays one match with other teams in the group once. The top 2 teams of the groups qualify for semi-finals.
- The teams are allocated in the groups according to their league positions after half season. Group A consists of Kitchee (1st), Lanwa Redbull (4th), Xiangxue Sun Hei (5th), Wofoo Tai Po (8th) and Hong Kong 08 (10th). Group B consists of South China (2nd), Rangers (3rd), Happy Valley (6th), Citizen (7th) and HKFC (9th).

== Group stage ==
=== Group A ===
Team	Pts	Pld	W	D	L	GF	GA	GD
Kitchee	10	4	3	1	0	7	3	4
Xiangxue Sun Hei	8	4	2	2	0	8	2	6
Wofoo Tai Po	4	4	1	1	2	4	4	0
Lanwa Redbull	3	4	1	0	3	3	7	-4
Hong Kong 08	3	4	1	0	3	1	7	-6

11 January 2007
18:00

Kitchee	2-0	Hong Kong 08
Julius Akosah 45', 51'	(in Chinese)	Wong Shun Him (yellow card) 53'

Mong Kok Stadium
Attendance: 350
Referee: Liu Kwok Man

11 January 2007
20:00

Lanwa Redbull	0-2	Wofoo Tai Po
Liu Zhiming (yellow card) 32'; You Ling (yellow card) 84'; Shi Meng (yellow card) 84'; Aldo Villalba (yellow card) 90'	(in Chinese)	Chiu Chun Kit 12'; Chiu Chun Kit (yellow card) 39'; Edgar Aldrighi Junior (yellow card) 55'; Lui Chi Hing 60'; Kwok Wing Sun (yellow card) 63'; Christian Kwesi Annan (yellow card) 89'

Mong Kok Stadium
Attendance: 350
Referee: Lui Siu Cheun

25 January 2007
18:00

Hong Kong 08	0-2	Lanwa Redbull
Chan Ming Kong (yellow card) 45'; Ho Min Tong (yellow card) 74'; Chau Chun Wing (yellow card) 90'	(in Chinese)	Aldo Villalba 2', 75'; Liu Jie (yellow card) 20'; Zhu Xuyu (yellow card) 44'; Luo Jing (yellow card) 60'

Mong Kok Stadium
Attendance: 400
Referee: Lam Sing Yan

25 January 2007
20:00

Wofoo Tai Po	1-1	Xiangxue Sun Hei
Christian Kwesi Annan 23'; Chiu Chun Kit (yellow card) 90'	(in Chinese)	Lee Wai Lun (yellow card) 14'; Colly Barnes Ezeh (yellow card) 30'; Chu Siu Kei (yellow card) 31'; Victor Eromosele Inegbenoise 67'; Tse Man Wing (yellow card) 69'; Lau Chi Keung (red card) 85'

Mong Kok Stadium
Attendance: 400
Referee: Ng Chiu Kwok

28 January 2007
14:00

Xiangxue Sun Hei	3-0	Hong Kong 08
Lico 1', 90'; Chan Yiu Lun 32'	(in Chinese)	Lo Chun Kit (yellow card) 45'

Mong Kok Stadium
Attendance: 627
Referee: Fung Ka Yu

28 January 2007
16:00

Lanwa Redbull	1-2	Kitchee
Lin Zhong 33'; Aldo Villalba (yellow card) 49'; Luo Jing (yellow card) 54'; Geng Xin (yellow card) 90'	(in Chinese)	Szeto Man Chun (yellow card) 45'; Wilfed Bamnjo (yellow card) 74'; Wilfed Bamnjo 89'; Ivan Jević 90'

Mong Kok Stadium
Attendance: 627
Referee: Wong Chi Tan

3 February 2007
14:00

Hong Kong 08	1-0	Wofoo Tai Po
Ho Min Tong (yellow card) 40'; Au Yeung Yiu Chung 70'; Chau Chun Wing (yellow card) 58' (yellow-red card) 89'	(in Chinese)	So Loi Kwung (yellow card) 48'; Edgar Aldrighi Junior (yellow card) 56'; Li Hon Ho (yellow card) 68'; Leung Kam Fai (yellow card) 82'; Chan Sze Wing (yellow card) 86'; Chiu Chun Kit (yellow card) 90'

Mong Kok Stadium
Attendance: 1,291
Referee: Wong Po On

3 February 2007
16:00

Kitchee	1-1	Xiangxue Sun Hei
Liu Quankun 81'; Gao Wen (yellow card) 83'; Ivan Jević (yellow card) 86'	(in Chinese)	Lico 5'; Da Silva Joao Miguel Pinto (yellow card) 29'; Barnes Colly Ezeh (yellow card) 34' (yellow-red card) 72'

Mong Kok Stadium
Attendance: 1,291
Referee: Ching Oi Cho

10 February 2007
14:00

Xiangxue Sun Hei	3-0	Lanwa Redbull
Victor Eromosele Inegbenoise 24', 61', 76'; Cristiano Cordeiro (yellow card) 81'	(in Chinese)	Fan Qi (yellow card) 40'; Wang Gang (yellow card) 77'; Lin Zhong (yellow card) 80'

Mong Kok Stadium
Attendance: 796
Referee: Fong Yau Fat

10 February 2007
16:00

Wofoo Tai Po	1-2	Kitchee
Edgar Aldrighi Junior 27'; Edgar Aldrighi Junior (yellow card) 33'; Chan Yuk Chi (yellow card) 34'; So Hong Shing (yellow card) 41'; Kwok Wing Sun (yellow card) 90'; Joel Bertoti Padilha (red card) 90'	(in Chinese)	Luk Koon Pong 29'; Liu Quankun (red card) 45'; Gao Wen (yellow card) 53'; Cheung Kin Fung (yellow card) 70'; Keith Gumbs 90'

Mong Kok Stadium
Attendance: 796
Referee: Ng Kai Lam

=== Group B ===
Team	Pts	Pld	W	D	L	GF	GA	GD
Happy Valley	7	4	2	1	1	8	5	3
South China	7	4	2	1	1	5	2	3
Citizen	6	4	1	3	0	5	3	2
Rangers	5	4	1	2	1	5	6	-1
HKFC	1	4	0	1	3	4	11	-7

18 January 2007
18:00

Rangers	2-2	Citizen
Lo Kwan Yee (yellow card) 38'; Fan Weijun (yellow card) 51'; Fan Weijun 62'; Lo Kwan Yee 85'; Alex Xavier (yellow card) 83'; Ghislain Bell Bell (yellow card) 87'; Godfred Karikari (yellow card) 87'	(in Chinese)	Leung Chun Pong 13'; Anthony Dela Nyatepe (yellow card) 16'; Chao Pengfei 36'; Li Chun Yip (yellow card) 83'; Moses Mensah (yellow card) 90'

Mong Kok Stadium
Attendance: 831
Referee: Chan Siu Hung

18 January 2007
20:00

South China	2-0	HKFC
Detinho 35' (pen.), 70'; Wong Chun Yue (yellow card) 90'	(in Chinese)	Chan Man Chun (yellow card) 16'; Cheng Lai Hin (yellow card) 34'; Lai Chun Kit (yellow card) 43'; Torin William Didenko (yellow card) 61'

Mong Kok Stadium
Attendance: 831
Referee: Ching Oi Jo

27 January 2007
14:00

HKFC	1-1	Rangers
Chan Man Chun (yellow card) 14'; Li Hang Wui (yellow card) 19'; Lai Chun Kit (yellow card) 29'; Chan Hon Hing (yellow card) 39'; Ho Kwok Chuen (red card) 45'; Wong Yiu Fu 90'	(in Chinese)	Alex Xavier 43'

Mong Kok Stadium
Attendance: 692
Referee: Bao Sai Yin

27 January 2007
16:00

Citizen	0-0	Happy Valley
Wang Zhengchuang (yellow card) 28'; Jorginho (yellow card) 76'	(in Chinese)	Poon Yiu Cheuk (yellow card) 27' (yellow-red card) 37'; Gerard Ambassa Guy (yellow card) 59'; Feng Jizhi (yellow card) 77'

Mong Kok Stadium
Attendance: 692
Referee: Ng Kai Lam

1 February 2007
18:00

Happy Valley	5-2	HKFC
Fábio Lopes 6', 17'; Gerard Ambassa Guy 21'; Feng Jizhi (yellow card) 41'; Evanor 65'; Law Chun Bong 89'	(in Chinese)	Michael John Challoner 27'; Wong Yiu Fu (yellow card) 84'; Jaimes Mckee 90'

Mong Kok Stadium
Attendance: 937
Referee: Fung Ka Yu

1 February 2007
20:00

Rangers	0-2	South China
Lo Kwan Yee (yellow card) 28'; Fung Ka Ki (yellow card) 39'; Ayock Louis Berty (yellow card) 53'; Godfred Karikari (yellow card) 63'	(in Chinese)	Zhang Chunhui (yellow card) 19'; Lee Chi Ho (yellow card) 35'; Cristiano Alves Pereira 57'; Tales Schutz 72'; Li Haiqiang (yellow card) 89'; Bai He (yellow card) 90'

Mong Kok Stadium
Attendance: 937
Referee: Lam Shing Yan

4 February 2007
14:00

HKFC	1-3	Citizen
Cheng Lai Hin 11'; Wong Yiu Fu (yellow card) 31'; Lo Yiu Hung (yellow card) 32'; Li Hang Wui (yellow card) 59'	(in Chinese)	Li Chun Yip (yellow card) 22'; Xu Deshuai (yellow card) 31'; Jorginho 40', 84'; Festus Baise (yellow card) 65'; Chao Pengfei 78'

Mong Kok Stadium
Attendance: 2,232
Referee: Liu Kwok Man

4 February 2007
16:00

South China	1-2	Happy Valley
Cheng Siu Wai (yellow card) 31'; Cheng Siu Wai 45'; Man Pei Tak (yellow card) 75'; Detinho (yellow card) 90'; Au Wai Lun (yellow card) 90'	(in Chinese)	Law Chun Bong 1'; Gerard Ambassa Guy (yellow card) 17'; Gerard Ambassa Guy 45'; Etoga Romaric (yellow card) 27' (yellow-red card) 47'; Vandré (yellow card) 51'; Fábio Lopes (yellow card) 71' (yellow-red card) 90'

Mong Kok Stadium
Attendance: 2,232
Referee: Chan Siu Hung

11 February 2007
14:00

Happy Valley	1-2	Rangers
Cheung Sai Ho 52'; Lee Wai Man (yellow card) 77'; Li Ming (yellow card) 80'	(in Chinese)	Yu Yang (yellow card) 16'; Godfred Karikari 27', 72'; Xiao Guoji (red card) 38'; Chan Wai Ho (yellow card) 45'; Fung Ka Ki (yellow card) 59'; Lo Kwan Yee (yellow card) 90'

Mong Kok Stadium
Attendance: 2,292
Referee: Ching Oi Jo

11 February 2007
16:00

Citizen	0-0	South China
Lai Ka Fai (yellow card) 68'; Chao Pengfei (yellow card) 90'	(in Chinese)	Chan Chi Hong (yellow card) 43'; Kwok Kin Pong (yellow card) 48'; Li Haiqiang (yellow card) 81'; Cheng Siu Wai (yellow card) 82'; Cristiano Alves Pereira (yellow card) 90'

Mong Kok Stadium
Attendance: 2,292
Referee: Cheung Yim Yau

== Knockout stage ==
All times are Hong Kong Time (UTC+8).

=== Bracket ===
Semifinals
A1	Kitchee (AET)	1 (2)
B2	South China	1 (1)
A2	Xiangxue Sun Hei	2 (2)
B1	Happy Valley (PSO)	2 (4)

Finals
A1	Kitchee	2
B1	Happy Valley	1

Hong Kong League Cup 2006–07 Winner

Kitchee
Second Title

=== Semi-finals ===
10 March 2007
14:00

Xiangxue Sun Hei	2-2 2-2 (AET) 2-4 (PSO)	Happy Valley
Cordeiro 15'; Barnes Colly Ezeh 78'; Chan Yiu Lun (yellow card) 81'; Lee Wai Lun (yellow card) 105'; Cordeiro (yellow card) 109'; Lau Chi Keung (yellow card) 63' (yellow-red card) 111'; Chan Ho Man (yellow card) 114'	(in Chinese)	Poon Yiu Cheuk 26' (pen.); Fabio Lopes Alcantara 40'; Evanor (yellow card) 42'; Tong Kin Man (yellow card) 59'; Poon Man Tik (yellow card) 72'
Penalties
Chu Siu Kei: scored Lee Wai Lun: scored Chan Yiu Lun: saved Joao Miguel Pinto Da Silva: saved	2:4	Poon Yiu Cheuk: scored Vandre Sagrillo Monteiro: scored Lee Sze Ming: scored Evanor: scored

Hong Kong Stadium
Attendance: 3,234
Referee: Fung Ka Yu

10 March 2007
16:00

Kitchee	1-1 2-1(AET)	South China
Liu Quankun (yellow card) 5'; Ivan Jević 45'; Julius Akosah (yellow card) 79'; Luk Koon Pong (yellow card) 84'; Wilfed Bamnjo 98' (pen.); Keith Gumbs (yellow card) 105'	(in Chinese)	Deng Jinghuang (yellow card) 23'; Tales Schutz (yellow card) 36'; Li Haiqiang 49'; Lee Chi Ho (yellow card) 56'; Man Pei Tak (yellow card) 97'; Au Wai Lun (yellow card) 105'; Zhang Jianzhong (red card) 118'

Hong Kong Stadium
Attendance: 3,234
Referee: Ng Kai Lam

=== Final ===
18 March 2007
15:00

Happy Valley	1-2	Kitchee
Cheung Sai Ho (yellow card) 28'; Lee Wai Man (yellow card) 48'; Poon Yiu Cheuk 56' (pen.); Poon Man Tik (yellow card) 58'; Gerard Ambassa Guy (yellow card) 70'	(in Chinese)	Liu Quankun (yellow card) 18'; Julius Akosah (yellow card) 50'; Chan Siu Ki (yellow card) 67'; Darko Rakočević 72', 76'; Tam Siu Wai (yellow card) 90'

Mong Kok Stadium
Attendance: 1,355
Referee: Wong Chi Tang

== Scorers ==
4 goals

- (Nigeria) Victor Eromosele Inegbenoise of Xiangxue Sun Hei

3 goals

- (Brazil) Fábio Lopes of Happy Valley
- (Brazil) Lico of Xiangxue Sun Hei

2 goals

- (China) Chao Pengfei of Citizen
- (Brazil) Jorginho of Citizen
- (Hong Kong) Gerard Ambassa Guy of Happy Valley
- (Hong Kong) Law Chun Bong of Happy Valley
- (Hong Kong) Poon Yiu Cheuk of Happy Valley
- (Serbia) Darko Rakočević of Kitchee
- (Serbia) Ivan Jević of Kitchee
- (Cameroon) Julius Akosah of Kitchee
- (Cameroon) Wilfed Bamnjo of Kitchee
- (Paraguay) Aldo Villalba of Lanwa Redbull
- (Ghana) Godfred Karikari of Rangers
- (Brazil) Detinho of South China

1 goal

- (Hong Kong) Leung Chun Pong of Citizen
- (Hong Kong) Cheung Sai Ho of Happy Valley
- (Brazil) Evanor of Happy Valley
- (Hong Kong) Cheng Lai Hin of HKFC
- (Hong Kong) Jaimes Mckee of HKFC
- (Hong Kong) Michael John Challoner of HKFC
- (Hong Kong) Wong Yiu Fu of HKFC
- Au Yeung Yiu Chung of Hong Kong 08
- (Saint Kitts and Nevis) Keith Gumbs of Kitchee
- (Hong Kong) Liu Quankun of Kitchee
- (Hong Kong) Luk Koon Pong of Kitchee
- (China) Lin Zhong of Lanwa Redbull
- (Brazil) Alex Xavier of Rangers
- (China) Fan Weijun of Rangers
- (Hong Kong) Lo Kwan Yee of Rangers
- (Hong Kong) Cheng Siu Wai of South China
- (Togo) (Brazil) Cristiano Alves Pereira of South China
- Li Haiqiang of South China
- (Brazil) Tales Schutz of South China
- (Hong Kong) Chiu Chun Kit of Wofoo Tai Po
- (Ghana) Christian Kwesi Annan of Wofoo Tai Po
- (Brazil) Edgar Aldrighi Junior of Wofoo Tai Po
- (Hong Kong) Lui Chi Hing of Wofoo Tai Po
- (Hong Kong) Barnes Colly Ezeh of Xiangxue Sun Hei
- (Hong Kong) Chan Yiu Lun of Xiangxue Sun Hei
- (Hong Kong) Cordeiro of Xiangxue Sun Hei

== Individual prizes ==
- Best Defensive Player Award: Darko Rakočević of Kitchee
- Top Goalscorer: Victor Eromosele Inegbenoise of Xiangxue Sun Hei

== Trivia ==
- Happy Valley has lost in the League Cup for the 5th consecutive season.
- Happy Valley suffers their 7th consecutive losses in the final of local competitions.
- All three goals in the final were from free kicks. The goal of Happy Valley was from a Penalty kick while the two goals of Kitchee were from a Direct free kick and Indirect free kick respectively.
- The semi-finals were originally scheduled to play in Mong Kok Stadium. However, the 4 teams in the semi-finals suggested HKFA to move the matches to Hong Kong Stadium. However, after the matches, many football fans expressed their opinions that this is a main cause for the low attendance on that day.

== See also ==
- Hong Kong League Cup
- The Hong Kong Football Association
- 2006–07 in Hong Kong football
- Hong Kong FA Cup 2006-07
- Hong Kong First Division League 2006-07
- Hong Kong Senior Shield 2006-07
