= 25th Guangdong–Hong Kong Cup =

Guangdong-Hong Kong Cup 2002–03 is the 25th staging of this two-leg competition between Hong Kong and Guangdong.

The first leg was played in Guangzhou while the second leg was played in Hong Kong.

Guangzhou captured the champion by winning an aggregate 4–1 against Hong Kong.

== Rules ==
- Each team was allowed to register a maximum of 5 foreign players, among which only 3 of them could be played in the match at the same time.

== Squads ==
=== Hong Kong ===
- (Hong Kong) Fan Chun Yip
- (Hong Kong) Chung Ho Yin
- (Hong Kong) Cheung Yiu Lun
- (Hong Kong) Leung Chi Wing
- (Hong Kong) Chan Wai Ho
- (Brazil) Cristiano Cordeiro
- (Hong Kong) Ng Wai Chiu
- (Hong Kong) Poon Yiu Cheuk
- (Hong Kong) Cheung Sai Ho
- (South Korea) Kim Pan-Gon
- (Hong Kong) Lo Chi Kwan
- (Hong Kong) Lee Wai Man
- (Hong Kong) Man Pei Tak
- (Hong Kong) Lee Kin Wo
- (Nigeria) Cornelius Udebuluzor
- (Hong Kong) Chan Ho Man
- (Hong Kong) Au Wai Lun
- (Indonesia) Rochy Putiray
- (Hong Kong) Chan Chi Hong
- (Saint Kitts and Nevis) Keith Gumbs
- (Hong Kong) Szeto Man Chun
- (Cameroon) Gerard Ambassa Guy
- (Brazil) Márcio Gabriel Anacleto

=== Guangdong ===
The team was formed mainly by players from Jia A 2002 1st runner-up Shenzhen Kejian Pingan. It also invited 4 players from Jia A champion team Dalian Shide. Some of the players in the squad include:

- (China) Chen Yongqiang
- (China) Ji Mingyi (from Dalian)
- (China) Li Fei
- (China) Li Jianhua
- (China) Li Ming (from Dalian)
- (China) Li Yi (captain)
- (China) Liu Jian
- (China) Sun Gang
- (China) Wang Hongwei
- (China) Wang Peng (from Dalian)
- (China) Wen Guanghui
- (China) Yang Guang
- (China) Yuan Lin
- (China) Zhang Xinxin
- (China) Zheng Zhi
- (China) Zheng Bin
- (China) Zou Jie (from Dalian)

== Results ==
First Leg

29 December 2002
20:00 UTC+8

Guangdong	2 – 0	Hong Kong
Wang Peng 15'; Zou Jie 25'; Zou Jie (red card) 90'		Gerard (red card) 90'

Guangdong Provincial People's Stadium, Guangzhou

Second Leg

5 January 2003
15:00 UTC+8

Hong Kong	1 – 2	Guangdong
Kim Pan-Gon 64'	Report	Li Yi 22', 35'; Li Yi (yellow card) 56' (yellow-red card) 69'

Hong Kong Stadium
Attendance: 2,761

== Trivia ==
- Dalian Shide players Wang Peng and Zou Jie were top scorers in AFC Youth Championship 2002.
- Zheng Zhi only played for the second match. He was the Jia A 2002 Player of the Year.
