= 29th Guangdong–Hong Kong Cup =

Guangdong-Hong Kong Cup 2006–07 is the 29th staging of this two-leg competition between Hong Kong and Guangdong.

The first leg was played in Panyu on 30 December 2006 and the second leg was played in Hong Kong Stadium on 7 January 2007.

The Guangdong match was played in Panyu Fo Ying Dong Stadium in remembrance of the death of Henry Fok, HKFA's Life Honorary President, for Panyu is the home town of Mr. Fok.

Hong Kong captured the champion by winning an aggregate 4–3 after against Guangdong extra time.

== Squads ==
=== Hong Kong ===
The first leg's squad consists of 18 players where 15 of them are from Hong Kong and three are mainland Chinese players who are now playing in Hong Kong First Division League.
The second leg's squad also consists of 18 players which was selected from a 20-people training squad.
Team Manager:
Pui Kwan Kay
Lawrence Kam Kei Yu
Coach:
Lai Sun Cheung
Tsang Wai Chung
Goalkeeper coach:
Chu Kwok Kuen
Physiotherapist:
Cousin Yat Hong Lui
Team Assistant:
Kwan Kon Sang

No.	Pos.	Player	Date of birth (age)	Caps	Club
22	GK	(Hong Kong) Ng Yat Hoi *	6 November 1986 (age 20)		Hong Kong 08
17	GK	(China) Li Jian	19 September 1985 (age 21)		(Hong Kong) Kitchee
19	GK	(Hong Kong) Li Hon Ho #	14 July 1986 (age 20)		(Hong Kong) Wofoo Tai Po
3	DF	(China) Wu Haopeng	14 February 1985 (age 21)		(Hong Kong) Citizen
2	DF	(Hong Kong) Lin Junsheng	18 January 1985 (age 21)		(Hong Kong) Kitchee
6	DF	(Hong Kong) Tong Kin Man	10 January 1985 (age 21)		(Hong Kong) Happy Valley
4	DF	(Hong Kong) Li Hang Wui	15 February 1985 (age 21)		(Hong Kong) HKFC
5	DF	(Hong Kong) Leung Kam Fai	17 July 1986 (age 20)		(Hong Kong) Wofoo Tai Po
19	DF	(Hong Kong) Chan Siu Yuen #	2 November 1987 (age 19)		(Hong Kong) Rangers
14	MF	(Hong Kong) Chan Ming Kong	1 July 1985 (age 21)		Hong Kong 08
15	MF	(Hong Kong) Chan Man Fai	19 June 1988 (age 18)		Hong Kong 08
12	MF	(Hong Kong) Wong Shun Him	12 June 1985 (age 21)		Hong Kong 08
16	MF	(Hong Kong) Leung Chun Pong	1 October 1986 (age 20)		(Hong Kong) Citizen
10	MF	(Hong Kong) Lam Ka Wai	5 June 1985 (age 21)		(Hong Kong) Rangers
11	MF	(Hong Kong) Yip Chi Ho	21 October 1985 (age 21)		(Hong Kong) Rangers
7	MF	(Hong Kong) Leung Tsz Chun	19 May 1985 (age 21)		(Hong Kong) Rangers
13	MF	(Hong Kong) Sham Kwok Keung	10 September 1985 (age 21)		(Hong Kong) Happy Valley
20	MF	(Hong Kong) Kwok Kin Pong #	30 March 1987 (age 19)		(Hong Kong) South China
8	FW	(China) Yuan Yang	12 December 1985 (age 21)		(Hong Kong) Citizen
18	FW	(Hong Kong) Chan Siu Ki	14 July 1985 (age 21)		(Hong Kong) Kitchee
9	FW	(Hong Kong) Cheng Lai Hin	31 March 1986 (age 20)		(Hong Kong) HKFC

(*) Included in first leg's squad only
(#) Included in second leg's squad only

=== Guangdong ===
Team Manager:
Shen Xiangfu 沈祥福
Head coach:
Gu Guangming 古廣明

No.	Pos.	Player	Date of birth (age)	Caps	Club
1	GK	Zhi Xinhua 支鑫華			(China) Guangzhou Pharm. 广州医药
2	DF	Li Zhihai 李志海			(China) Guangzhou Pharm. 广州医药
3	MF	Li Yan 李岩			(China) Guangzhou Pharm. 广州医药
4	DF	Zhou Lin 周麟 #			(China) Guangzhou Pharm. 广州医药
5	MF	Jia Wenpeng 賈文鵬 #			(China) Guangzhou Pharm. 广州医药
6	DF	Huang Zhiyi 黄志毅			(China) Guangzhou Pharm. 广州医药
7	MF	Feng Junyan 冯俊彦			(China) Guangzhou Pharm. 广州医药
9	MF	Cao Zhijie 曹志杰			(China) Guangzhou Pharm. 广州医药
12	FW	Li Zhixing 黎志星			(China) Guangzhou Pharm. 广州医药
15	MF	Ren Dazhong 任达重			(China) Guangzhou Pharm. 广州医药
17	MF	Luo Yong 罗勇			(China) Guangzhou Pharm. 广州医药
18	MF	Gao Ming 高明 #			(China) Guangzhou Pharm. 广州医药
19	DF	Yang Xichang 杨熙昌			(China) Guangzhou Pharm. 广州医药
21	GK	Zhang Yuntao 张云涛			(China) Guangzhou Pharm. 广州医药
23	MF	Lu Lin 卢琳			(China) Guangzhou Pharm. 广州医药
24	DF	He Wenyao 何文耀 *			(China) Guangzhou Pharm. 广州医药
29	DF	Tang Dechao 唐德超			(China) Guangzhou Pharm. 广州医药
36	FW	Xu Deen 徐德恩			(China) Guangzhou Pharm. 广州医药
39	MF	Yang Pengfeng 杨朋锋			(China) Guangzhou Pharm. 广州医药
		Chen Qian 陳謙 *			(China) Guangzhou Pharm. 广州医药
		Chen Liming 陳立明 *			(China) Guangzhou Pharm. 广州医药
		Huang Baocheng 黃保成 *			(China) Guangzhou Pharm. 广州医药
	MF	Cai Yaohui 蔡堯輝 *			(China) Guangzhou Pharm. 广州医药

 * Included in 1st leg's squad only
 # Included in 2nd leg's squad only

== Fixtures ==
First Leg

30 December 2006
15:00

Guangdong	1-0	Hong Kong
Lu Lin (yellow card) 2'; Yang Pengfeng (yellow card) 84'; Feng Junyan 90'	(in Chinese)	Leung Tsz Chun (yellow card) 28'; Wu Haopeng (yellow card) 63'

Yingdong Stadium

Second Leg

7 January 2007
15:30

Hong Kong	3-2 4-2(AET)	Guangdong
Sham Kwok Keung 23' (pen.); Li Hang Wui (yellow card) 25'; Chan Siu Ki 28', 108'; Feng Junyan 44' (o.g.)	(in Chinese)	Li Zhihai 14'; Li Zhixing 36'; Li Zhixing (yellow card) 40'; Lu Lin (yellow card) 51'; Li Zhihai (yellow card) 83'

Hong Kong Stadium
Attendance: 2,488

== See also ==
- Guangdong-Hong Kong Cup
- 2006-07 in Hong Kong football
- Hong Kong First Division League 2006-07
- Hong Kong Senior Shield 2006-07
- Hong Kong League Cup 2006-07
- Hong Kong FA Cup 2006-07
