= 16th Guangdong–Hong Kong Cup =

Guangdong-Hong Kong Cup 1993–94 is the 16th staging of this two-leg competition between Hong Kong and Guangdong.

The first leg was played in Mong Kok Stadium on 9 January 1994 while the second leg was played in Guangzhou on 16 January 1994.

Guangdong regained the champion by winning an aggregate 8–7 after penalty shootout against Hong Kong.

== Squads ==
=== Hong Kong ===
Some of the players in the squad include:

- (Hong Kong) Chan Sau Yin 陳秀賢
- (Hong Kong) Chiu Chun Ming 趙俊明
- (Hong Kong) Chan Chi Keung 陳志強
- (Hong Kong) Yan Lik Kin 甄力健
- (Hong Kong) Chan Wai Chiu 陳偉超
- (Hong Kong) Lee Kin Wo 李健和
- (Hong Kong) Chiu Chung Man 招重文
- (Hong Kong) Sham Kwok Pui 岑國培
- (Republic of Ireland) Tim O'Shea 奧沙
- (Australia) Ross Greer 基亞
- (England) Dale Tempest 譚拔士
- (Hong Kong) Lee Wai Man 李偉文
- (Hong Kong) Ng Chun Chong 吳圳聰

=== Guangdong ===
Some of the players in the squad includes:

- (China) Xie Yuxin 谢育新
- (China) Kong Guoxian 孔国贤
- (China) Mai Chao 麦超
- (China) Li Yong 李勇
- (China) Lü Jianjun 吕建军
- (China) Ling Xiaojun 凌小君
- (China) Yao Debiao 姚德彪
- (China) Zhang Bing 张兵
- (China) Yu Weiteng 余伟腾
- (China) Ou Chuliang 区楚良
- (China) Peng Weiguo 彭伟国
- (China) Chi Minghua 池明华
- (China) Fan Zhiyi 范志毅 (guest player)
- (China) Xu Hong 徐弘 (guest player)
- (China) Su Maozhen 宿茂臻 (guest player)

== Trivia ==
- Fan Zhiyi's sent off in extra time made him the first player to be sent off in this competition.
- Yan Lik Kin is the only player who missed in the penalty shootout.

== Results ==
First Leg

9 January 1994

Hong Kong	2-0	Guangdong
Lee Kin Wo 6'; Ross Greer 17'

Mong Kok Stadium

Second Leg

16 January 1994

Guangdong	3-1 3-1 (AET) 5-4 (PSO)	Hong Kong
Mai Chao 38'; Fan Zhiyi 40'; Xu Hong 89'; Fan Zhiyi (red card) 101'		Chan Chi Keung 33'

Guangdong Provincial People's Stadium, Guangzhou
