= 15th Guangdong–Hong Kong Cup =

Guangdong-Hong Kong Cup 1992–93 is the 15th staging of this two-leg football competition between Hong Kong and Guangdong.

The first leg was played in Mong Kok Stadium on 3 January 1993 while the second leg was played in Guangzhou on 10 January 1993.

Hong Kong captured champion by winning an aggregate 2–1 against Guangdong.

== Squads ==
=== Hong Kong ===
The Hong Kong team consists mainly of players from Eastern and the team has 3 non-Hong Kong players.
Some of the players in the squad include:

- (England) Iain Hesford 希福特
- (Hong Kong) Yau Kin Wai 丘建威
- (Hong Kong) Wong Wai Tak 黃偉德
- (Hong Kong) Chiu Chun Ming 趙俊明
- (Hong Kong) Lee Wai Man 李偉文
- (Hong Kong) Lee Kin Wo 李健和
- (Hong Kong) Chan Chi Keung 陳志強
- (Hong Kong) Lo Kai Wah 羅繼華
- (Australia) Ross Greer 基亞
- (Hong Kong) Tam Siu Wai 譚兆偉
- (England) Dale Tempest 譚拔士
- (Hong Kong) Chung Ho Yin 鍾皓賢
- (England) Trevor Quow 確路
- (Hong Kong) Au Wai Lun 歐偉倫

=== Guangdong ===
Some of the players in the squad includes:

- Peng Changying 彭昌穎
- Wu Qunli 吳群立
- Li Yong 李勇
- Ou Chuliang 區楚良

== Trivia ==
- Ross Greer's goal at 1 min 48 s in the first leg is the fastest goal in the competition history.

== Results ==
First Leg

3 January 1983

Hong Kong	1-1	Guangdong
Ross Greer 2'		Li Yong 54'

Mong Kok Stadium

Second Leg

10 January 1983

Guangdong	0-1	Hong Kong
		Tam Siu Wai ?'

Guangdong Provincial People's Stadium, Guangzhou
