= 4th Guangdong–Hong Kong Cup =

Guangdong-Hong Kong Cup 1981–82 is the fourth staging of this two-leg competition between Hong Kong and Guangdong.

The first leg was played in Hong Kong Stadium on 3 January 1982 while the second leg was played in Guangzhou on 12 January 1982.

Hong Kong won the Cup by winning 3–2 after extra time.

== Squads ==
=== Hong Kong ===
General Manager： (Hong Kong) Cheung Chi Wai 張志威、 (Hong Kong) Wong Chong San 黃創山
Manager： (Hong Kong) Chan Fai Hung 陳輝洪
Assistant Manager： (Hong Kong) Leung Tak Shing 梁德成
Physio： (Hong Kong) Leung Chung Wai 梁仲偉
Some of the players in the squad:

- (Hong Kong) Leung Shui Wing 梁帥榮
- (Hong Kong) Choi York Yee 蔡育瑜
- (Hong Kong) Chi Yat Bo 池一坡
- (Hong Kong) Chan Sai Kau 陳世九
- (Hong Kong) Wu Kwok Hung 胡國雄
- (Hong Kong) Lai Wing Cheung 黎永昌
- (Hong Kong) Lai Sun Cheung 黎新祥
- (Hong Kong) Tsui Kwok On 徐國安
- (Hong Kong) Leung Chun-kuen 梁振權
- (Netherlands) Theo de Jong 迪莊 (playing for Seiko)
- (Netherlands) Jan Verheijen 華希恩 (playing for Seiko)
- (Netherlands) 加納 (playing for Seiko)
- (Netherlands) Johannes Gerardes Wildbret 韋伯 (playing for Seiko)
- (Netherlands) 哥倫布 (playing for Seiko)
- (Netherlands) Cees Storm 史唐 (playing for Seiko)
- (Germany) Dieter Schwemmle 舒力拿 (playing for Bulova)
- (Malaysia) Chow Chee Keong 仇志強 (playing for Bulova)
- (Germany) Werner Reich 烈治 (playing for Bulova)
- (Australia) Peter Sharne 沙尼 (playing for Eastern)

=== Guangdong ===
General Manager： (China) Zhang Riyang 張日揚
Manager: (China) Xian Dixiong 冼迪雄
Physio： (China) Ye Wang 葉旺
Some of the players in the squad:

- (China) Wang Huiliang 王惠良
- (China) Huang Junwei 黃軍偉
- (China) Huang Debao 黃德保
- (China) Liu Quan 劉全
- (China) Lu Sheng 盧勝
- (China) Wei Xiaole 魏小樂
- (China) Wu Yaqi 吳亞七
- (China) Wu Yuhua 吳育華
- (China) Xie Zhixiong 謝志雄
- (China) Ye Xiquan 葉細權
- (China) Zhong Xiaojian 鐘小健
- (China) Cao Yang 曹陽
- (China) Chen Jiming 陳繼銘
- (China) Chen Yuliang 陳玉良
- (China) Chi Minghua 池明華
- (China) He Jinlun 何錦倫
- (China) Li Chaoyang 李朝陽

== Trivia ==
- This was the first time to include non-Chinese players on the Hong Kong team.
- This was the first time to have a match go into extra time.

== Results ==
First Leg

3 January 1982

Hong Kong	1-1	Guangdong
Reach Werner 3'		Wang Weiliang 30'

Government Stadium, Hong Kong

Second Leg

12 January 1982

Guangdong	1-1 (1-2 AET)	Hong Kong
Wu Yuhua 20'		Theo de Jong 37'; Reach Werner 111'

Guangdong Provincial People's Stadium, Guangzhou
