= 27th Guangdong–Hong Kong Cup =

Guangdong-Hong Kong Cup 2004–05 is the 27th staging of this two-leg competition between Hong Kong and Guangdong.

The first leg was played in Guangzhou while the second leg was played in Hong Kong.

Hong Kong captured champion by winning an aggregate 4–2 against Guangdong.

== Squads ==
=== Hong Kong ===
Some of the players in the squad include:

- (Hong Kong) Cheung Sai Ho 蔣世豪
- (Hong Kong) Law Chun Bong 羅振邦
- (Hong Kong) Au Wai Lun 歐偉倫
- (Hong Kong) Xiao Guoji 蕭國基
- (Hong Kong) Chan Siu Ki 陳肇麒
- (Hong Kong) Lau Chi Keung 劉志强
- (Hong Kong) Fan Chun Yip 范俊業

=== Guangdong ===
Guangdong sent the football team which represented the province for 2005 National Games of China. The average age of the team was younger than 20 years old. Some of the players in the squad include:

- Players of 20 years old or below:
  - (China) Huang Fengtao 黃鳳濤
  - (China) Lu Lin 盧琳
  - (China) Zhao Le 趙樂
- Players older than 20 years old:
  - (China) Yang Zhi 楊智 (Guangdong Kejian)
  - (China) Wu Weian 吳偉安
  - (China) Wu Pingfeng 吳坪楓
  - (China) Dai Xianrong 戴憲榮 (Guangzhou Sunray Cave)
- Coach:
  - (China) Chen Yuliang 陳玉良

== Results ==
First Leg

2 January 2005

| Guangdong | 0-2 | Hong Kong |
|---|---|---|
| | | Au Wai Lun 17'; Law Chun Bong 21'; Chan Siu Ki (yellow card) ?' (yellow-red card) 62' |

Guangdong Provincial People's Stadium, Guangzhou

Second Leg

9 January 2005

| Hong Kong | 2-2 | Guangdong |
|---|---|---|
| Cheung Sai Ho 45'; Au Wai Lun 82' | | Huang Fengtao 40'; Lu Lin 60' |

Hong Kong Stadium, Hong Kong

== Trivia ==
- After 2004 Indian Ocean earthquake, the HKFA announced that the second leg of this Guangdong-Hong Kong Cup would be for charity fund raising for the incident. All profits from the match went to the fund organized by AFC. More than 16,000 tickets were sold for the match and a fund of more than 2.8 million HK dollars was raised.
- Hong Kong lifted the trophy for the 10th time in history.
