= 24th Guangdong–Hong Kong Cup =

Guangdong-Hong Kong Cup 2001–02 is the 24th staging of this two-leg competition between Hong Kong and Guangdong.

The first leg was played in Hong Kong while the second leg was played in Guangzhou.

Hong Kong captured champion again by winning an aggregate 3–2 against Guangdong.

== Squads ==
=== Hong Kong ===
Some of the players in the squad include:

- (Hong Kong) Cheng Siu Chung Ricky 鄭兆聰
- (Hong Kong) Chan Ka Ki 陳家麒
- (Hong Kong) Yau Kin Wai 丘建威
- (Hong Kong) Lau Chi Keung 劉志強
- (Hong Kong) Lo Kai Wah 羅繼華
- (Hong Kong) Au Wai Lun 歐偉倫
- (Hong Kong) Cheung Sai Ho 蔣世豪
- (Cameroon) Gerard Ambassa Guy 卓卓
- (England) Gary McKeown 麥基昂
- (Brazil) Cristiano Preigchadt Cordeiro 高尼路
- (Brazil) Hartwig Carlo Andre Bieleman 安德烈
- (Niger) Cornelius Udebuluzor 哥連斯
- (Saint Kitts and Nevis) Keith Gumbs 基夫
- (Brazil) Finho 仙奴

== Results ==
First Leg

30 December 2001

Hong Kong XI	3-1	Guangdong
Cordeiro 6', 58'; Finho 11'		Li Yi 53'

Hong Kong Stadium, Hong Kong

Second Leg

6 January 2002

Guangdong	1-0	Hong Kong XI
Ye Zhibin 90' (pen.)

Guangdong Provincial People's Stadium, Guangzhou
