= 38th Guangdong–Hong Kong Cup =

- Event: Guangdong–Hong Kong Cup
Hong Kong	Guangdong
4	5

First leg
Hong Kong	Guangdong
1	1
- Date: 31 December 2015
- Venue: Mong Kok Stadium, Kowloon, Hong Kong
- Referee: Chan Ming Siu
- Attendance: 4,273

Second leg
Guangdong	Hong Kong
4	3
- Date: 3 January 2016
- Venue: Guangdong Provincial People's Stadium, Guangzhou, Guangdong
- Referee: Tan Hai

The 38th Guangdong–Hong Kong Cup was held on 31 December 2015 and 3 January 2016. Guangdong won their 23rd title after winning 5–4 on aggregate.

== Squads ==
=== Guangdong ===
- Head Coach: (China) Chen Yuliang
- Team Leader: (China) Ou Chuliang
- Assistant coach: (China) Li Zhihai, (China) Wu Yaqi, (China) Chen Daying, (China) Yao Debiao

No.	Pos.	Player	Date of birth (age)	Caps	Club
1	GK	Luo Zuqing	27 April 1993 (aged 22)		(China) Henan Jianye
2	DF	Lin Juyuan	18 March 1993 (aged 22)		(China) Meizhou Kejia
3	DF	Guan Haojin	26 August 1995 (aged 20)		(China) Guangzhou R&F
6	MF	Shi Hongjun	4 October 1991 (aged 24)		(China) Meizhou Kejia
7	DF	Zeng Chao	23 January 1993 (aged 22)		(China) Guangzhou R&F
8	MF	Chen Zhizhao	14 March 1988 (aged 27)		(China) Guangzhou R&F
10	MF	Ye Chugui	8 September 1994 (aged 21)		(China) Guangzhou R&F
12	DF	Huang Jiaqiang	14 March 1990 (aged 25)		(China) Jiangxi Liansheng
13	GK	Pan Weiming	27 December 1978 (aged 37)		(China) Meixian Hakka
14	DF	Li Jianhua	12 February 1982 (aged 33)		(China) Guangzhou R&F
17	MF	Li Zhilang	22 August 1991 (aged 24)		(China) Meizhou Kejia
18	MF	Yu Jianfeng	29 January 1989 (aged 26)		(China) Meizhou Kejia
21	FW	Cai Jingyuan	1 January 1987 (aged 28)		(China) Shenzhen F.C.
22	GK	Hou Yu	20 December 1990 (aged 25)		(China) Meizhou Kejia
23	MF	Lu Lin	3 February 1985 (aged 30)		(China) Guangzhou R&F
26	DF	Chen Jianlong	14 May 1989 (aged 26)		(China) Meizhou Kejia
27	MF	Peng Shaoxiong	27 May 1989 (aged 26)		(China) Meizhou Kejia
29	DF	Tang Dechao	9 February 1985 (aged 30)		(China) Meizhou Kejia
33	MF	Hu Weiwei	3 March 1993 (aged 22)		(China) Qingdao Jonoon
36	FW	Ni Bo	4 May 1989 (aged 26)		(China) Guangzhou Evergrande Taobao
38	DF	Tian Junjie	3 February 1993 (aged 22)		(China) Meixian Hakka
55	DF	Tu Dongxu	13 November 1991 (aged 24)		(China) Meizhou Kejia

=== Hong Kong ===
The final 21-man squad of Hong Kong was announced on 28 December 2015.

- Head Coach: (Hong Kong) Liu Chun Fai

No.	Pos.	Player	Date of birth (age)	Caps	Club
1	GK	Tsang Man Fai	2 August 1991 (aged 24)		(Hong Kong) GS Wong Tai Sin
2	DF	Tsang Kam To	21 June 1989 (aged 26)		(Hong Kong) Eastern
3	DF	Chan Hin Kwong	27 February 1988 (aged 27)		(Hong Kong) Yuen Long
4	DF	Cheung Chi Yung	30 June 1989 (aged 26)		(Hong Kong) South China
5	DF	Leung Kwun Chung	1 April 1992 (aged 23)		(Hong Kong) HK Pegasus
6	MF	Tan Chun Lok	15 January 1996 (aged 19)		(Hong Kong) HK Pegasus
7	FW	Hui Ka Lok	5 January 1994 (aged 21)		(Hong Kong) BC Rangers
8	MF	Lee Ka Yiu	10 April 1992 (aged 23)		(Hong Kong) HK Pegasus
9	FW	Lo Kong Wai	19 June 1992 (aged 23)		(Hong Kong) HK Pegasus
10	MF	Itaparica	8 July 1980 (aged 35)		(China) Xinjiang Tianshan Leopard
11	FW	Lam Hok Hei	18 September 1991 (aged 24)		(Hong Kong) South China
12	DF	Leung Nok Hang	14 November 1994 (aged 21)		(Hong Kong) HK Pegasus
13	MF	Tam Lok Hin	19 January 1991 (aged 24)		(Hong Kong) Yuen Long
14	DF	Fong Pak Lun	14 April 1993 (aged 22)		(Hong Kong) HK Pegasus
15	FW	Hui Wang Fung	4 February 1994 (aged 21)		(Hong Kong) BC Rangers
16	MF	Chan Siu Kwan	1 August 1992 (aged 23)		(Hong Kong) South China
17	DF	Wong Chun Ho	31 May 1990 (aged 25)		(Hong Kong) HK Pegasus
18	GK	Yuen Ho Chun	19 July 1995 (aged 20)		(Hong Kong) HK Pegasus
19	GK	Chiu Yu Ming	9 November 1991 (aged 24)		(Hong Kong) Yuen Long
20	MF	Lau Ho Lam	22 January 1993 (aged 22)		(Hong Kong) Dreams Metro Gallery
21	DF	Lau Hok Ming	19 October 1995 (aged 20)		(Hong Kong) Dreams Metro Gallery

== Match details ==
=== First leg ===
31 December 2015
20:00 UTC+8

Hong Kong	1–1	Guangdong
Tan Chun Lok 39'	Report	Cai Jingyuan 25'

Mong Kok Stadium, Mong Kok, Hong Kong
Attendance: 4,273
Referee: Chan Ming Siu

=== Second leg ===
3 January 2016
15:30 UTC+8

Guangdong	4–3	Hong Kong
Lu Lin 37' (pen.), 85'; Ye Chugui 54'; Tu Dongxu 56'	Report	Cheung Chi Yung 21'; Tam Lok Hin 33'; Itaparica 48' (pen.)

Guangdong Provincial People's Stadium, Guangzhou, Guangdong
Referee: Tan Hai

Guangdong won 5–4 on aggregate.
