= 36th Guangdong–Hong Kong Cup =

36th Guangdong-Hong Kong Cup
- Event: Guangdong-Hong Kong Cup
Hong Kong	Guangdong
4	6

First leg
Hong Kong	Guangdong
2	3
- Date: 29 December 2013
- Venue: Mong Kok Stadium, Mong Kok
- Referee: Ho Wai Sing (Hong Kong)
- Attendance: 3,502
- Weather: Sunny; 13 °C (55 °F); 72% humidity

Second leg
Guangdong	Hong Kong
3	2
- Sunny; 20 °C (68 °F); 23% humidity
- Date: 1 January 2014
- Venue: Huizhou Olympic Stadium, Huizhou, Guangdong
- Referee: Li Haixin (China PR)

The 36th Guangdong-Hong Kong Cup will be held on 29 December 2013 and 1 January 2014. The first leg will be played at Mong Kok Stadium with the second leg to take place at Huizhou Olympic Stadium.

== Squads ==
=== Guangdong ===
- Head coach: (China) Ou Chuliang
- Assistant coach: (China) Feng Feng, (China) Tian Ye

No.	Pos.	Player	Date of birth (age)	Caps	Club
1	GK	Liang Hua	2 March 1993 (aged 20)		(China) Guangdong Youth
3	DF	Liu Sheng	8 September 1989 (aged 24)		(China) Guangdong Sunray Cave
4	DF	Guo Zichao	25 January 1989 (aged 24)		(China) Guangdong Sunray Cave
5	DF	Cui Ning	23 January 1993 (aged 20)		(China) Guangdong Youth
6	DF	Hu Yongfa	20 September 1993 (aged 20)		(China) Shenzhen Fengpeng
7	MF	Huang Haoxuan	15 January 1994 (aged 19)		(China) Guangdong Youth
8	MF	Wang Qiang	3 October 1987 (aged 26)		(China) Guangdong Sunray Cave
9	FW	Wei Jingxing	18 March 1993 (aged 20)		(China) Guangdong Youth
10	MF	Lu Lin	3 February 1985 (aged 28)		(China) Guangzhou R&F
11	MF	Yang Bin	3 October 1991 (aged 22)		(China) Guangdong Sunray Cave
12	GK	Pan Weiming	27 December 1978 (aged 35)		(China) Guangdong Sunray Cave
16	MF	Li Jian	1 March 1989 (aged 24)		(China) Guangdong Sunray Cave
17	MF	Yu Jianfeng	29 January 1989 (aged 24)		(China) Guangdong Sunray Cave
18	MF	Zhang Yong	20 April 1989 (aged 24)		(China) Guangdong Sunray Cave
20	DF	Zhu Cong	8 February 1985 (aged 28)		(China) Guangdong Sunray Cave
22	FW	Ye Weichao	18 February 1989 (aged 24)		(China) Guangzhou Evergrande
23	MF	Feng Zhuoyi	18 June 1989 (aged 24)		(China) Guangzhou R&F
25	MF	Yang Jian	4 October 1988 (aged 25)		(China) Guangdong Sunray Cave
26	MF	Liu Tao	22 January 1985 (aged 28)		(China) Guangdong Sunray Cave
29	MF	Chang Feiya	3 February 1993 (aged 20)		(China) Guangzhou R&F
33	FW	Cai Jingyuan	1 January 1987 (aged 26)		(China) Guangdong Sunray Cave

=== Hong Kong ===
- Head coach: (South Korea) Kim Pan-Gon

No.	Pos.	Player	Date of birth (age)	Caps	Club
1	GK	Yapp Hung Fai	21 March 1990 (aged 23)	27	(Hong Kong) South China
2	DF	Lee Chi Ho	16 November 1982 (aged 31)	51	(Hong Kong) South China
3	DF	Che Runqiu	23 October 1990 (aged 23)	0	(Hong Kong) Southern
4	MF	Bai He	19 November 1983 (aged 30)	23	(Hong Kong) Sun Pegasus
5	DF	Tsang Chi Hau	12 January 1990 (aged 23)	3	(Hong Kong) Kitchee
6	MF	Michael Luk	August 22, 1986 (aged 27)	4	(Hong Kong) South China
7	FW	Chan Siu Ki	July 14, 1985 (aged 28)	51	(China) Guangdong Sunray Cave
8	MF	Lee Hong Lim	September 29, 1983 (aged 30)	26	(Hong Kong) South China
10	MF	Lam Ka Wai	June 5, 1985 (aged 28)	23	(Hong Kong) Kitchee
13	DF	Cheung Kin Fung	1 January 1984 (aged 29)	23	(Hong Kong) Kitchee
14	FW	Sham Kwok Keung	June 5, 1985 (aged 28)	21	(Hong Kong) Citizen
15	MF	Ip Chung Long	November 16, 1989 (aged 24)	1	(Hong Kong) Southern
16	MF	Leung Chun Pong	1 October 1986 (aged 27)	36	(China) Guangdong Sunray Cave
17	DF	Cheung Chi Yung	10 June 1989 (aged 24)	0	(Hong Kong) Yuen Long
18	GK	Leung Hing Kit	22 October 1989 (aged 24)	1	(Hong Kong) Biu Chun Rangers
19	GK	Tse Tak Him	10 February 1985 (aged 28)	9	(Hong Kong) Citizen
20	FW	Chan Man Fai	June 19, 1988 (aged 25)	10	(Hong Kong) Kitchee
21	DF	Kwok Kin Pong	30 March 1987 (aged 26)	25	(Hong Kong) South China
22	FW	Jaimes McKee	April 14, 1987 (aged 26)	12	(Hong Kong) Sun Pegasus
23	MF	Ju Yingzhi	July 24, 1987 (aged 26)	8	(Hong Kong) Sun Pegasus
24	DF	Fong Pak Lun	14 April 1993 (aged 20)	1	Yokohama FC Hong Kong

== Match details ==
=== First leg ===
29 December 2013	Hong Kong	2 – 3	Guangdong	Mong Kok, Kowloon
15:00(GMT+8)	Chan Siu Ki 39'; Ju Yingzhi 45+1'	Report	4' Cui Ning; 9' Huang Haoxuan; 89' Lu Lin	Stadium: Mong Kok Stadium (Capacity:6,680); Attendance: 3,502; Referee: Ho Wai Sing (Hong Kong)

Hong Kong	Guangdong

HOME TEAM:
GK	1	(Hong Kong) Yapp Hung Fai (c)
RB	21	(Hong Kong) Kwok Kin Pong		(substituted off) 69'
CB	2	(Hong Kong) Lee Chi Ho		(substituted off) 69'
CB	5	(Hong Kong) Tsang Chi Hau	(yellow card) 79'
LB	24	(Hong Kong) Fong Pak Lun
DM	16	(Hong Kong) Leung Chun Pong		(substituted off) 73'
CM	22	(Hong Kong) Ju Yingzhi
AM	10	(Hong Kong) Lam Ka Wai		(substituted off) 86'
RW	20	(Hong Kong) Chan Man Fai		(substituted off) 60'
LW	8	(Hong Kong) Lee Hong Lim		(substituted off) 82'
ST	7	(Hong Kong) Chan Siu Ki	(yellow card) 27'
Substitutes:
GK	18	(Hong Kong) Leung Hing Kit
DF	3	(Hong Kong) Che Runqiu		(substituted on) 69'
MF	4	(Hong Kong) Bai He
MF	6	(Hong Kong) Michael Luk		(substituted on) 86'
DF	13	(Hong Kong) Cheung Kin Fung
FW	14	(Hong Kong) Sham Kwok Keung		(substituted on) 60'
MF	15	(Hong Kong) Ip Chung Long		(substituted on) 82'
DF	17	(Hong Kong) Cheung Chi Yung		(substituted on) 69'
FW	22	(Hong Kong) Jaimes McKee		(substituted on) 73'
Coach:
(South Korea) Kim Pan-Gon

AWAY TEAM:
GK	12	(China) Pan Weiming
RB	23	(China) Feng Zhuoyi
CB	3	(China) Liu Sheng (c)
CB	5	(China) Cui Ning	(yellow card) 1'
LB	20	(China) Zhu Cong		(substituted off) 87'
RM	16	(China) Li Jian		(substituted off) 66'
CM	18	(China) Zhang Yong		(substituted off) 90+5'
CM	17	(China) Yu Jianfeng		(substituted off) 15'
CM	25	(China) Yang Jian
LM	7	(China) Huang Haoxuan
ST	9	(China) Wei Jingxing		(substituted off) 37'
Substitutes:
GK	1	(China) Liang Hua
DF	4	(China) Guo Zichao
MF	8	(China) Wang Qiang
MF	10	(China) Lu Lin		(substituted on) 37'
MF	11	(China) Yang Bin		(substituted on) 87'
FW	22	(China) Ye Weichao		(substituted on) 15' (substituted off) 77'
MF	26	(China) Liu Tao		(substituted on) 90+5'
MF	29	(China) Chang Feiya		(substituted on) 66'
FW	33	(China) Cai Jingyuan		(substituted on) 77'
Coach:
(China) Ou Chuliang

MATCH OFFICIALS

- Assistant referees:
  - Chan Shui Hung (Hong Kong)
  - Lam Chi Ho (Hong Kong)
- Fourth official:
  - Tong Kui Sum (Hong Kong)

MATCH RULES

- 90 minutes. (1st Half Added Time: mins, 2nd Half Added Time: mins)
- Unlimited named substitutes
- Maximum of 6 substitutions.

=== Second leg ===
1 January 2014	Guangdong	3 – 2	Hong Kong	Huizhou, Guangdong
15:00(GMT+8)	Yang Jian 39'; Lu Lin 77' (pen.), 78'	Report	9' McKee; 48' Chan Man Fai	Stadium: Huizhou Olympic Stadium (Capacity:40,000); Referee: Li Haixin (China PR)

Guangdong	Hong Kong

HOME TEAM:
GK	12	(China) Pan Weiming
RB	6	(China) Hu Yongfa		(substituted off) 52'
CB	3	(China) Liu Sheng
CB	5	(China) Cui Ning
LB	20	(China) Zhu Cong
RM	16	(China) Li Jian
CM	18	(China) Zhang Yong	(yellow card) 41'
CM	23	(China) Feng Zhuoyi
CM	25	(China) Yang Jian
LM	7	(China) Huang Haoxuan		(substituted off) 68'
ST	9	(China) Wei Jingxing		(substituted off) 58'
Substitutes:
GK	1	(China) Liang Hua
DF	4	(China) Guo Zichao
MF	8	(China) Wang Qiang
MF	10	(China) Lu Lin		(substituted on) 52'
MF	11	(China) Yang Bin
FW	22	(China) Ye Weichao	(yellow card) 90'	(substituted on) 58'
MF	26	(China) Liu Tao
MF	29	(China) Chang Feiya		(substituted on) 68'
FW	33	(China) Cai Jingyuan
Coach:
(China) Ou Chuliang

AWAY TEAM:
GK	1	(Hong Kong) Yapp Hung Fai
RB	21	(Hong Kong) Kwok Kin Pong		(substituted off) 89'
CB	17	(Hong Kong) Cheung Chi Yung
CB	5	(Hong Kong) Tsang Chi Hau
LB	24	(Hong Kong) Fong Pak Lun		(substituted off) 68'
DM	13	(Hong Kong) Cheung Kin Fung	(yellow card) 21'	(substituted off) 46'
CM	12	(Hong Kong) Ngan Lok Fung		(substituted off) 81'
AM	10	(Hong Kong) Lam Ka Wai
RM	20	(Hong Kong) Chan Man Fai		(substituted off) 72'
LM	22	(Hong Kong) Jaimes McKee
ST	14	(Hong Kong) Sham Kwok Keung		(substituted off) 46'
Substitutes:
GK	18	(Hong Kong) Leung Hing Kit
DF	2	(Hong Kong) Lee Chi Ho	(red card) 76'	(substituted on) 68'
DF	3	(Hong Kong) Che Runqiu
MF	6	(Hong Kong) Michael Luk		(substituted on) 89'
FW	7	(Hong Kong) Chan Siu Ki		(substituted on) 46'
MF	8	(Hong Kong) Lee Hong Lim		(substituted on) 46'
MF	15	(Hong Kong) Ip Chung Long
MF	16	(Hong Kong) Leung Chun Pong		(substituted on) 81'
MF	23	(Hong Kong) Ju Yingzhi	(yellow card) 73'	(substituted on) 72'
Coach:
(South Korea) Kim Pan-Gon

MATCH OFFICIALS

- Assistant referees:
  - Liang Songshang (China PR)
  - Xie Weijian (China PR)
- Fourth official: Zhan Jiajun (China PR)

MATCH RULES

- 90 minutes. (1st Half Added Time: mins, 2nd Half Added Time: mins)
- 30 minutes of extra-time if necessary.
- Penalty shoot-out if scores still level.
- Unlimited named substitutes
- Maximum of 5 substitutions.
