= 11th Guangdong–Hong Kong Cup =

Guangdong-Hong Kong Cup 1988–89 is the 11th staging of this two-leg competition between Hong Kong and Guangdong.

The first leg was played in Guangzhou while the second leg was played in Hong Kong on 1 January 1989.

Hong Kong regained the championship by winning an aggregate 4–3 against Guangdong.

== Squads ==
=== Hong Kong ===
Some of players in the squads include:

- Chan Shu Ming 陳樹明
- Cheung Chi Tak 張志德
- Lai Lo Kau 賴羅球
- Leung Sui Wing 梁帥榮
- Yu Kwok Sum 余國森
- Lee Kin Wo 李健和
- Leslie George Santos 山度士
- Ku Kam Fai 顧錦輝
- Lai Wing Cheung 黎永昌
- Sze Wai Shan 施維山
- Chan Fat Chi 陳發枝
- Chan Ping On 陳炳安
- Yue Kin Tak 茹健德
- Chan Wai Chiu 陳偉超
- Tim Bredbury 巴貝利
- Law Wai Chi 羅偉志

=== Guangdong ===
Guangdong team consists of 17 players.

- Guo Yijun 郭亿军
- Liang Haoxian 梁浩先
- Kong Guoxian 孔国贤
- Mai Chao 麦超
- Ou Chuliang 区楚良
- Xie Yuxin 谢育新
- Wu Qunli 吴群立
- Wu Wenbing 伍文兵
- Zhang Xiaowen 张小文

== Trivia ==
- Hong Kong recaptured the championship after Guangdong won six consecutive times between 1982 and 1988.

== Results ==
First Leg

25 December 1988

Guangdong	1-0	Hong Kong
Guo Yijun 77'

Guangdong Provincial People's Stadium

Second Leg

1 January 1989

Hong Kong	4-2	Guangdong
Law Wai Chi 48'; Chan Fat Chi 67'; Cheung Chi Tak 70' (pen.); Tim Bredbury 82'		Wu Qunli 44'; Mai Chao 87' (pen.)

Hong Kong Stadium
