= 2nd Guangdong–Hong Kong Cup =

Guangdong-Hong Kong Cup 1979–80 is the 2nd staging of this two-leg competition between Hong Kong and Guangdong.

The first leg was played in Hong Kong Stadium on 30 December 1979 while the second leg was played in Guangzhou on 13 January 1980.

Hong Kong captured the champion for their first time by winning an aggregate 1–0.

== Squads ==
=== Hong Kong ===
The team consists of 19 players. Some of the players include:

- Ma Bit Hung 馬必雄
- Leung Sui Wing 梁帥榮
- Lai Sun Cheung 黎新祥
- Choi York Yee 蔡育瑜
- Ma Tin Hung 馬天雄
- Chan Fat Chi 陳發枝
- Wu Kwok Hung 胡國雄
- Tsang Ting Fai 曾廷輝
- Cheung Ka Ping 張家平
- Chung Chor Wai 鍾楚維
- Lau Wing Yip 劉榮業
- Sze Wai Shan 施維山
- Li Kwai Hung 李桂雄
- Lo Fuk Hing 盧福興
- Wong Kwok On 黃國安
- Chui Kwok On 徐國安

=== Guangdong ===
Some of the players in the squad:

- Cai Jinbiao 蔡錦標
- Chen Xirong 陳熙榮
- Rong Zhixing 容志行
- Ou Weiting 歐偉庭
- Yang Ning 楊寧

== Results ==
First Leg

30 December 1979

Hong Kong	1–0	Guangdong
Lau Wing Yip 19'

Government Stadium, Hong Kong

Second Leg

13 January 1980

Guangdong	0–0	Hong Kong

Yuexiushan Stadium, Guangzhou
