= 12th Guangdong–Hong Kong Cup =

Guangdong-Hong Kong Cup 1989–90 is the 12th staging of this two-leg competition between Hong Kong and Guangdong.

The first leg was played in Hong Kong Stadium on 6 January 1990 while the second leg was played in Guangzhou on 13 January 1990.

Hong Kong gained the champion by winning an aggregate 2–1 against Guangdong.

== Squads ==
=== Hong Kong ===
Some of players in the squad include:

- Lau Tong Ping 劉棟平
- Cheung Chi Tak 張志德
- Chan Ping On 陳炳安
- Wong Kwok On 黃國安
- Chan Wai Chiu 陳偉超
- Law Wai Chi 羅偉志
- Leslie George Santos 山度士
- Ku Kam Fai 顧錦輝
- Lai Wing Cheong 黎永昌
- Tim Bredbury 巴貝利
- Chow Chi Shing 周志成
- Ng Kam Hung 吳鑑鴻
- Chu Yu Tai 朱雨大

=== Guangdong ===
Some of players in the squads include:

- Guo Yijun 郭億軍
- Li Chaoyang 李朝陽

== Trivia ==
- It is the first time for Hong Kong to win the champion in consecutive time.

== Results ==
First Leg

6 January 1990

Hong Kong	0-1	Guangdong
		Guo Yijun 75'

Hong Kong Stadium

Second Leg

13 January 1990

Guangdong	0-2	Hong Kong
		Tim Bredbury 20'; Li Chaoyang ?' (O.G.)

Guangzhou
