= Li Zhixing =

Chinese footballer (born 1985)

Li Zhixing 黎志星
Personal information
- Date of birth: 8 November 1985 (age 40)
- Place of birth: Guangzhou, Guangdong, China
- Height: 1.87 m (6 ft 2 in)
- Position: Striker

Senior career*
Years	Team	Apps	(Gls)
2002–2009	Guangzhou GPC	28	(7)
2003–2004	→ Xiangxue Pharmaceutical	8	(2)
2007–2008	→ Shenzhen Xiangxue Eisiti (loan)	7	(1)
2009–2010	TSW Pegasus	9	(3)
2010–2011	Persibo Bojonegoro	11	(4)
- * Club domestic league appearances and goals as of 28 March 2009

Li Zhixing (Chinese: 黎志星; born 8 November 1985) is a former Chinese footballer. He was released by Guangzhou Pharmaceutical at the end of season 2008. He previously plays for Hong Kong First Division League club TSW Pegasus. The last he played as a striker for Indonesia Super League club Persibo Bojonegoro before release after one match.

== Career Statistics in Hong Kong ==
As of 11 September 2009

Club	Season	League		Senior Shield		League Cup		FA Cup		AFC Cup		Total	
Club	Season	Apps	Goals	Apps	Goals	Apps	Goals	Apps	Goals	Apps	Goals	Apps	Goals
TSW Pegasus	2009-10	2 (0)	0	0 (0)	0	0 (0)	0	0 (0)	0	N/A	N/A	2 (0)	0
TSW Pegasus	All	2 (0)	0	0 (0)	0	0 (0)	0	0 (0)	0	N/A	N/A	2 (0)	0
