= Jorginho (footballer, born October 1975) =

Brazilian football coach and former player

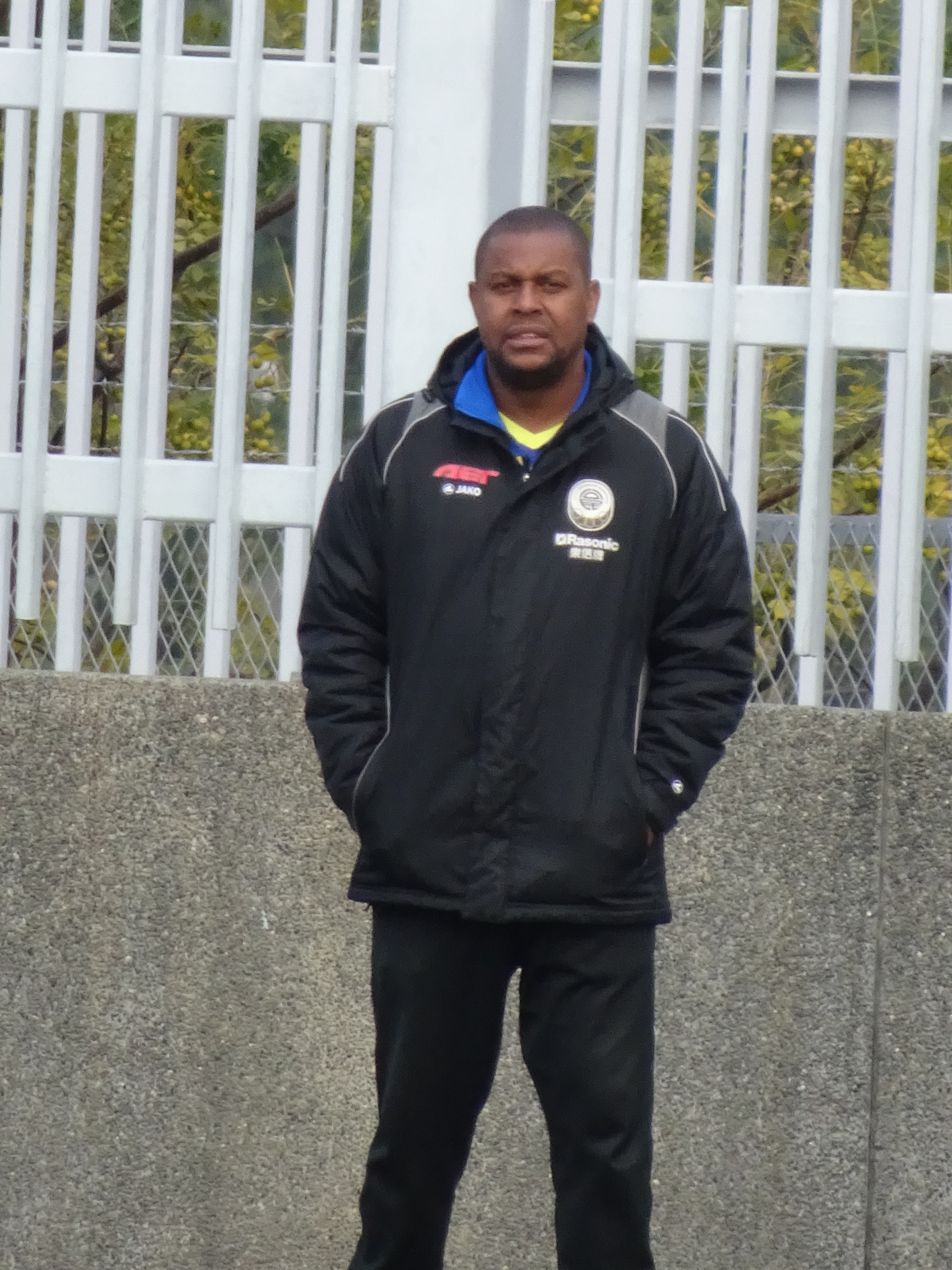

Personal information
- Full name: Jorge Claudio Conceiçao Rodriguez
- Date of birth: 1 October 1975 (age 51)
- Place of birth: São Paulo, Brazil
- Height: 1.73 m (5 ft 8 in)
- Position: Midfielder

Youth career
- Corinthians

Senior career*
Years	Team	Apps	(Gls)
1994	Corinthians Alagoano	3	(0)
1995–1996	Corinthians	31	(4)
1997	Goiás	11	(1)
1998–1999	Arsenal Tula	43	(8)
1999	→ Krylia Sovetov Samara (loan)	5	(0)
2000–2001	Comercial		
2002	Pohang Steelers	3	(0)
2004	Närpes Kraft	0	(0)
2004–2005	Maccabi Petah Tikva	0	(0)
2005–2006	Sun Hei	5	(2)
2007	Citizen	5	(0)

Managerial career
- 2008–2014: Citizen
- 2014–2022: Citizen (assistant coach)
- * Club domestic league appearances and goals

Jorge Claudio Conceiçao Rodriguez (born 1 October 1975), or simply Jorginho, is a Brazilian football coach and a former professional footballer.

== Personal life ==
His son, Gabriel Sloane-Rodrigues, is a professional footballer for the Wellington Phoenix. Born in Hong Kong, Sloane-Rodrigues represents New Zealand at youth international level.
