= 5th Guangdong–Hong Kong Cup =

Guangdong-Hong Kong Cup 1982–83 is the 5th staging of this two-leg competition between Hong Kong and Guangdong.

Guangdong captured the champion by winning an aggregate 5–4 after penalty shootout.

== Trivia ==
- Away goal system is not used yet. It is the first time for the result to be decided by penalty shootout in this competition.

== Results ==
First Leg

?

Guangdong	1-1	Hong Kong
? ?'		? ?'

Guangzhou

Second Leg

?

Hong Kong	0-0 0-0 (AET) 3-4 (PSO)	Guangdong

Hong Kong Stadium
