= Wu Yuhua =

Chinese footballer

Wu Yuhua 吴育华
Personal information
- Full name: Wu Yuhua
- Date of birth: 1 December 1960 (age 65)
- Place of birth: Guangzhou, Guangdong, China
- Height: 1.85 m (6 ft 1 in)
- Position: Midfielder

Senior career*
Years	Team	Apps	(Gls)
- Guangdong team

International career
1982–1984	China	7	(0)
Medal record
Men's football
Representing China
AFC Asian Cup
Silver medal – second place	1984 Singapore	Team
- * Club domestic league appearances and goals

Wu Yuhua is a Chinese football midfielder who played for China in the 1984 Asian Cup. He also played for Guangdong team .

== Career statistics ==
=== International statistics ===
Year	Competition	Apps	Goal
1982	FIFA World Cup qualification	1	0
1984	Friendly	1	0
1984	Asian Cup	5	0
Total		7	0
