= Wei Jingxing =

Chinese association football player

Personal information
- Date of birth: 18 March 1993 (age 33)
- Place of birth: Meizhou, Guangdong, China
- Height: 1.85 m (6 ft 1 in)
- Position: Forward

Youth career
- –2013: Guangdong FA

Senior career*
Years	Team	Apps	(Gls)
2014	Shaanxi Wuzhou	0	(0)
2015–2017	Shenzhen FC	0	(0)
2017	→ Shanghai Sunfun (loan)	6	(0)
2018–2021	Jiangxi Beidamen	80	(26)
2023	Guangxi Lanhang	17	(2)
- * Club domestic league appearances and goals as of 14:01, 24 August 2021 (UTC)

Wei Jingxing (Chinese: 魏景星; born 18 March 1993) is a Chinese footballer who plays as a forward.

== Career statistics ==
=== Club ===
As of 24 August 2021.

Club	Season	League			Cup		Other		Total	
Club	Season	Division	Apps	Goals	Apps	Goals	Apps	Goals	Apps	Goals
Shaanxi Wuzhou	2014	China League One	0	0	0	0	0	0	0	0
Shenzhen FC	2015	China League One	0	0	0	0	0	0	0	0
Shenzhen FC	2016	China League One	0	0	0	0	0	0	0	0
Shenzhen FC	2017	China League One	0	0	0	0	0	0	0	0
Shenzhen FC	Total		0	0	0	0	0	0	0	0
Shanghai Sunfun (loan)	2017	China League Two	6	0	1 (Note: Appearances in the Chinese FA Cup)	1	0	0	7	1
Jiangxi Beidamen	2018	China League Two	24	9	0	0	2 (Note: Appearances in the China League Two playoffs)	0	26	9
Jiangxi Beidamen	2019	China League Two	30	16	2	0	4	1	36	17
Jiangxi Beidamen	2020	China League One	11	0	0	0	1 (Note: Appearances in the China League One relegation playoffs)	0	12	0
Jiangxi Beidamen	2021	China League One	15	1	0	0	0	0	15	1
Jiangxi Beidamen	Total		80	26	2	0	7	1	89	27
Career total			86	26	3	1	7	1	96	28
