= Huizhou Olympic Stadium =

Sports venue in Huizhou, China

Coordinates: 23.0333°N 114.4465°E

Huizhou Olympic Stadium 惠州奥林匹克体育场
- Interactive map of Huizhou Olympic Stadium 惠州奥林匹克体育场
- Full name: Huizhou Olympic Stadium
- Former names: Huizhou Central Stadium
- Location: Huizhou, Guangdong, China
- Capacity: 40,000
- Surface: Grass

Construction
- Groundbreaking: July 6, 2007
- Opened: February 5, 2010
- Cost: ¥ 900 million
- Architect: China Construction Design International (CCDI)

Huizhou Olympic Stadium (Chinese: 惠州奥林匹克体育场) is a multi-purpose stadium in Huizhou, Guangdong, China, that opened in 2010.

The stadium holds 40,000 spectators. It is currently used mostly for football matches. It served as the home stadium for Shenzhen Ruby of the Chinese Super League during the 2011 season. It also served as the home stadium for the Guangdong football team in the 2012, 2013, 2014 and 2015 Guangdong–Hong Kong Cup.
