= Guo Yijun =

Chinese footballer and coach

Personal information
- Date of birth: 23 September 1963 (age 63)
- Place of birth: Xingning, Guangdong, China
- Height: 1.80 m (5 ft 11 in)
- Positions: Defender; midfielder

Senior career*
| Years | Team | Apps | (Gls) |
| 1981–1993 | Guangdong team | | |

International career
| 1986–1992 | China | 42 | (1) |
| 1988 | China Olympic | 3 | (0) |

Managerial career
- 1994: Guangdong Winnerway (assistant)
- 1997: Guangdong Winnerway
- 2009: Guangdong U-16
- 2018–2019: Hainan Boying (caretaker)
- 2024: Guangdong Mingtu
Medal record
Men's football
Representing China
AFC Youth Championship
| Silver medal – second place | 1982 Bangkok | Team |
University Games
| Bronze medal – third place | 1985 Kobe | Football |
- * Club domestic league appearances and goals

Guo Yijun (Chinese: 郭亿军; born 23 September 1963) is a Chinese football manager and former player. In his playing career, he played as a defender or midfielder and represented his country with the senior national team, and with the national 1988 Summer Olympics selection.

== Management career ==
After retiring from playing, Guo would soon move into management and joined his former club, Guangdong as their Assistant coach in the 1994 Chinese league season. He would go on to then become their Head coach in the 1997 league season. His tenure at the club was not a success, the team were relegated from the top tier and he left the club. Guo would move into youth coaching where he worked with the local Guangdong government, coaching the Guangdong U-16 team for the 2009 National Games of China.
