= Chi Minghua =

Chinese footballer and coach

Chi Minghua 池明华
Personal information
- Full name: Chi Minghua
- Date of birth: March 6, 1962 (age 64)
- Place of birth: Meixian, Guangdong, China
- Height: 1.77 m (5 ft 9 1/2 in)
- Position: Defender

Senior career*
Years	Team	Apps	(Gls)
1979–1997	Guangdong Winnerway		
1998	Yunnan Hongta		

International career
1982–1992	China	15	(0)

Managerial career
- 2009: Guangdong Women's
Medal record
Men's football
Representing China
AFC Asian Cup
Silver medal – second place	1984 Singapore	Team
University Games
Bronze medal – third place	1985 Kobe	Football
- * Club domestic league appearances and goals

Chi Minghua (Chinese: 池明华; born March 6, 1962) is a Chinese football coach and former international football player. As a player, he spent the majority of his career playing as a defender for Guangdong football team while internationally he represented China in the 1984 Asian Cup.

After retiring Chi would eventually return to football when he joined Chinese football club playing in the 2005–06 Hong Kong First Division League Dongguan Dongcheng where he was their General Manager for a brief period. Chi would then go into management when he had the chance to manage Guangdong Women's and Guangdong Women's youth team in 2009.

== Playing career ==
Chi Minghua started his career playing for the Guangdong football team where he started his career in the 1979 Chinese league season and saw his club win the league title. His performances for Guangdong would soon see him included into the Chinese national team where he would take part in the 1984 AFC Asian Cup and aided China to a runners-up spot to Saudi Arabia in a 2-0 defeat. When he returned to Guangdong he would win the 1983 Southern Group title with Guangdong and go on captain the side for the next several seasons. By 1994 the Chinese league became completely professional and despite nearing the end of career he carried on playing for the club until the 1997 league season before he moved to second tier club Yunnan Hongta F.C. where he ended his career.

== Career statistics ==
=== International statistics ===
Year	Competition	Apps	Goal
1982	Great Wall Cup	1	0
1982	Asian Games	4	0
1983–1992	Friendly	2	0
1984	Asian Cup	4	0
1985	FIFA World Cup qualification	1	0
1992	Asian Cup Qualification	3	0
Total		15	0

== Honours ==
=== Player ===
- Chinese Jia-A League: 1979
- Chinese Jia-A League: 1983 (Southern Group)
