= Lu Lin (footballer) =

Chinese footballer (born 1985)

Lu Lin[卢琳]
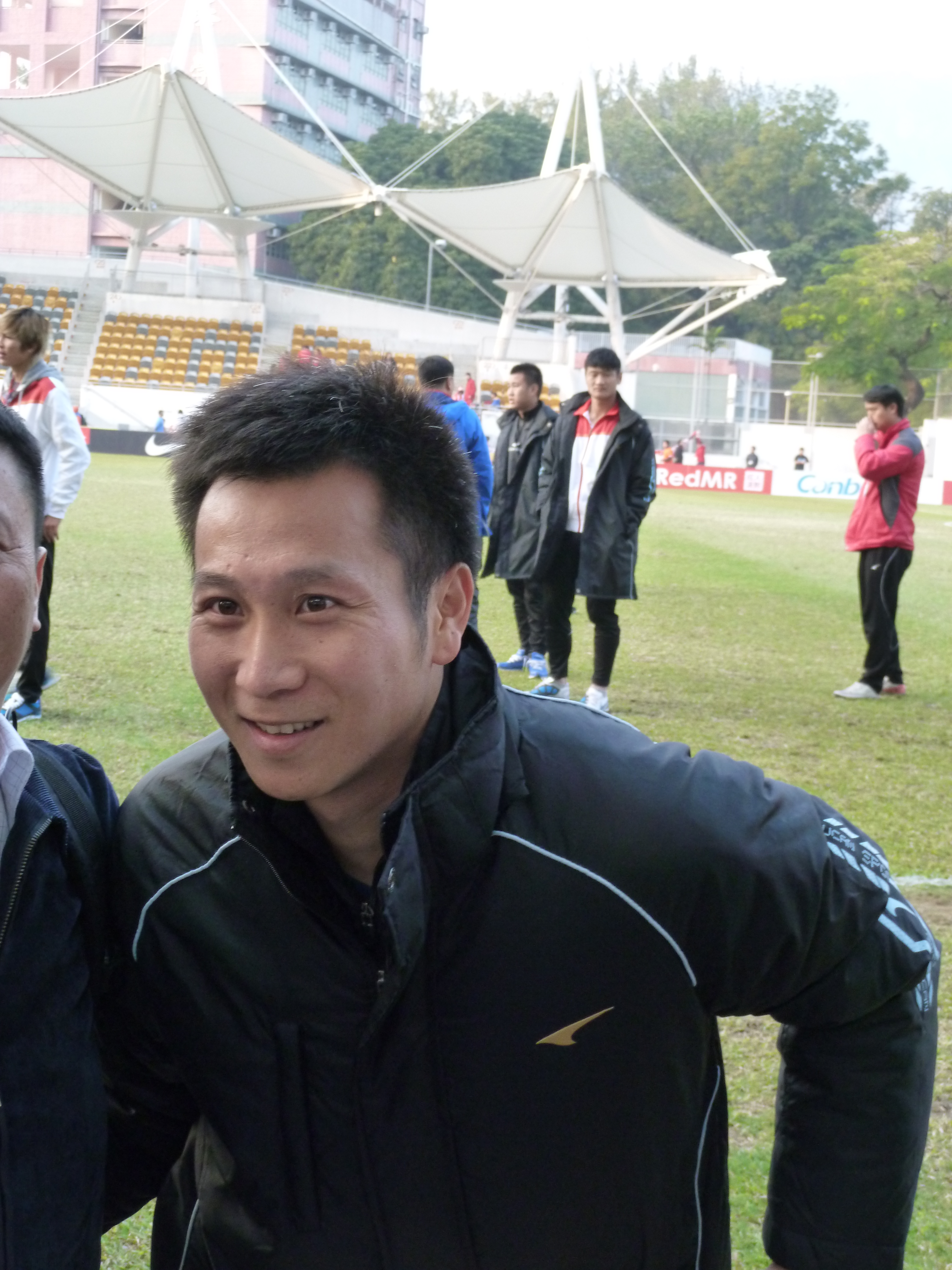

Personal information
- Date of birth: 3 February 1985 (age 41)
- Place of birth: Guangzhou, Guangdong, China
- Height: 1.68 m (5 ft 6 in)
- Position: Left winger

Youth career
- 2000–2002: Guangzhou FC

Senior career*
Years	Team	Apps	(Gls)
2002–2003	Xiangxue Pharmaceutical	?	(?)
2003–2010	Guangzhou Evergrande	148	(23)
2011	Guangdong Sunray Cave	24	(9)
2012–2021	Guangzhou R&F	207	(18)
2021–2022	Meizhou Hakka	24	(2)

International career
2005	China U-20	4	(1)
Medal record
Men's football
Representing China
East Asian Games
Gold medal – first place	2001 Macau	Football
- * Club domestic league appearances and goals as of 16 December 2022

Lu Lin
- Simplified Chinese: 卢琳
- Traditional Chinese: 盧琳
Transcriptions
Standard Mandarin
- Hanyu Pinyin: Lú Lín
- IPA: [lǔ lǐn]
Yue: Cantonese
- Jyutping: Lou4 Lam4
- IPA: [lɔw˩ lɐm˩]

Lu Lin (Chinese: 卢琳; pinyin: Lú Lín; Jyutping: Lou4 Lam4; born 3 February 1985) is a Chinese former football player who played as a left winger.

== Club career ==
Lu Lin was the product of the Guangzhou Pharmaceutical youth team and would soon be sent off to their satellite youth team Xiangxue Pharmaceutical to play within the 2002–03 Hong Kong First Division League before he broke into the Guangzhou senior team during the 2003 Chinese league season. With his good technical ability and awareness he would also break into the Chinese U-20 football team and play in the 2005 FIFA World Youth Championship. Upon his return he would go on to establish himself as a regular with Guangzhou and was part of the team that won the 2007 China League One division and promotion to the 2008 Chinese Super League.

Within the top tier Lu would help establish Guangzhou as mid-table regulars until the club was found guilty of match-fixing in 2006 and were punished with relegation at the end of the 2009 Chinese Super League season. Despite this Lu would remain faithful towards the club and was part of the team that went on to immediately win promotion back into the top tier at the end of the 2010 league season. Lu would, however decide to move to second tier club Guangdong Sunray Cave on a free transfer in February 2011 to gain more playing time. On 13 July, Lu Lin scored Guangdong's second goal in a friendly against Liverpool in a 4–3 loss.

Lu signed a three-year contract with Guangzhou R&F in December 2011 and would go on to represent them on more than 100 occasions. Lu is from Guangzhou and during his long career has only played professional football for Guangzhou-based teams which, combined with his displays on the pitch, makes him a favourite of the fans. This was confirmed on 8 May 2016 when Lu played his 300th competitive game for a professional team based in Guangzhou. He extended his contract with the club until the end of 2018 on 7 November 2016. On 26 April 2018, he extended his contract for another two years until the end of 2020 season.

On 4 February 2021, Lu joined second tier club Meizhou Hakka on a free transfer. He would go on to make his debut for the team in a league game on 25 April 2021 against Xinjiang Tianshan Leopard in a 2–1 victory. He would go on to establish himself as a vital member of the team that gained promotion to the top tier after coming second within the division at the end of the 2021 China League One campaign.

== International career ==
He would rise to prominence when he was called up to the Chinese U-20 football team in the 2005 FIFA World Youth Championship in the Netherlands and scoring a free kick in the 4-1 win over Panama in the group stage.

Lu Lin has also represented Guangdong Province in the annual Guangdong-Hong Kong Cup, including in 2014 when his two goals helped Guangdong to victory.

== Career statistics ==
Statistics accurate as of match played 16 December 2022.

Appearances and goals by club, season and competition
Club	Season	League			National Cup		Continental		Other		Total	
Club	Season	Division	Apps	Goals	Apps	Goals	Apps	Goals	Apps	Goals	Apps	Goals
Guangzhou FC	2003	Chinese Jia-B League	8	0	0	0	-		-		8	0
Guangzhou FC	2004	China League One	32	8	0	0	-		-		32	8
Guangzhou FC	2005	China League One	16	5	0	0	-		-		16	5
Guangzhou FC	2006	China League One	21	4	1	0	-		-		22	4
Guangzhou FC	2007	China League One	20	4	-		-		-		20	4
Guangzhou FC	2008	Chinese Super League	29	2	-		-		-		29	2
Guangzhou FC	2009	Chinese Super League	15	0	-		-		-		15	0
Guangzhou FC	2010	China League One	7	0	-		-		-		7	0
Guangzhou FC	Total		148	23	1	0	0	0	0	0	149	23
Guangdong Sunray Cave	2011	China League One	24	9	2	0	-		-		26	9
Guangzhou R&F	2012	Chinese Super League	28	1	1	1	-		-		29	2
Guangzhou R&F	2013	Chinese Super League	26	2	2	2	-		-		28	4
Guangzhou R&F	2014	Chinese Super League	25	6	1	0	-		-		26	6
Guangzhou R&F	2015	Chinese Super League	26	3	2	0	7	1	-		35	4
Guangzhou R&F	2016	Chinese Super League	24	3	6	1	-		-		30	4
Guangzhou R&F	2017	Chinese Super League	29	1	4	0	-		-		32	1
Guangzhou R&F	2018	Chinese Super League	26	2	5	3	-		-		31	5
Guangzhou R&F	2019	Chinese Super League	19	0	1	0	-		-		20	0
Guangzhou R&F	2020	Chinese Super League	4	0	2	0	-		-		6	0
Guangzhou R&F	Total		207	18	24	7	7	1	0	0	238	26
Meizhou Hakka	2021	China League One	24	2	0	0	-		-		24	2
Career total			403	52	27	7	7	1	0	0	437	60

== Honours ==
=== Club ===
Guangzhou F.C.

- China League One: 2007, 2010

=== Individual ===
- Guangdong's 'Mr Football': 2016, 2017, 2018
