= Szeto Man Chun =

Hong Kong footballer (born 1975)

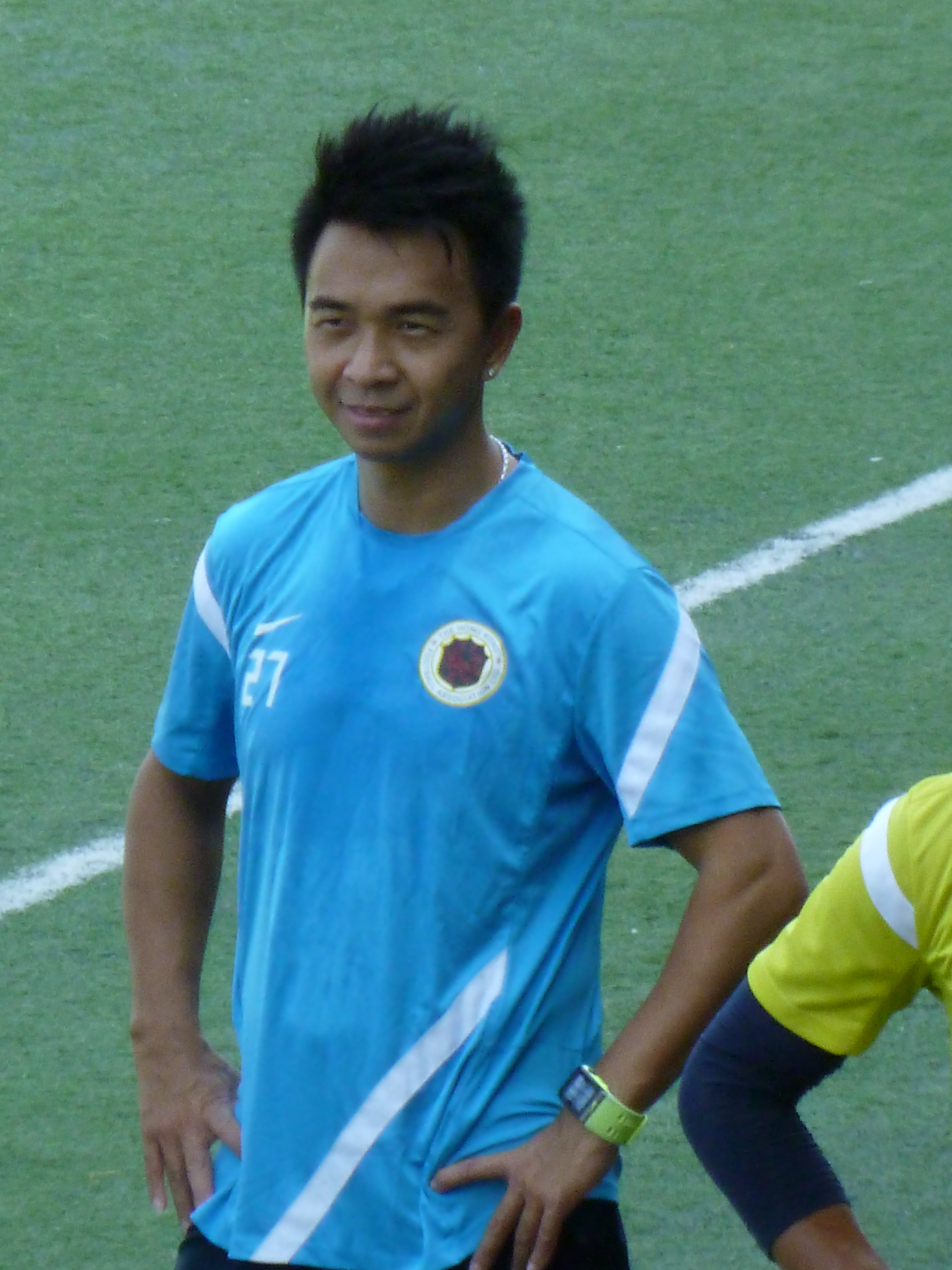

Personal information
- Full name: Szeto Man Chun
- Date of birth: 5 June 1975 (age 51)
- Place of birth: Hong Kong
- Height: 1.75 m (5 ft 9 in)
- Position: Defensive midfielder

Team information
- Current team: Rangers (head coach)

Senior career*
Years	Team	Apps	(Gls)
1993–1994	Voicelink		
1994–1998	Happy Valley		
1998–1999	Sai Kung Friends		
1999–2000	Sai Kung		
2000–2001	Orient & Yee Hope Union		
2001–2004	South China	26	(2)
2004–2008	Kitchee	34	(3)
2008–2009	Eastern	20	(2)
2011	Hoi Fan		

International career
2000–2007	Hong Kong	45	(1)

Managerial career
- 2013–2016: Hong Kong (team manager)
- 2016–2017: Eastern (assistant coach)
- 2017–2018: Eastern
- 2018: Eastern (team manager)
- 2018–2019: Eastern (deputy director)
- 2020–2021: Wigan Athletic (director)
- 2022–2024: HK U23
- 2023–2024: Hong Kong U-23
- 2024–2025: Lee Man (assistant coach)
- 2026–: Rangers (HKG)
- * Club domestic league appearances and goals

Szeto Man Chun (Chinese: 司徒文俊; Jyutping: si^{1} tou^{4} man^{4} zeon^{3}; born 5 June 1975) is a Hong Kong football coach and a former professional footballer who played as a defensive midfielder. He is the current head coach of Hong Kong Premier League club Rangers.

== International career ==
Szeto has played for the Hong Kong national football team for more than 8 years. In his football career, he played a lot of games against various national teams around the world, such as Denmark, Sweden, Brazil, Japan, South Korea and so on. He also played invitation matches with Liverpool and Real Madrid, etc.

Szeto retired from professional football after the 2008–09 season.

== Managerial career ==
Szeto started his coaching career during his professional career. Since 2007, he was one of the coaches of the Hong Kong national youth team.

On 27 May 2017, Eastern chairman announced Szeto as Chan Yuen Ting's successor as their head coach. He resigned less than a year later on 19 January 2018 due to poor results.

On 2 August 2022, it was reported that Szeto had become the head coach of HK U23.

In March 2023, Szeto was also appointed as the head coach of Hong Kong U-23.

On 17 July 2024, Szeto was appointed as the assistant coach of Lee Man.

On 4 July 2026, Szeto was appointed as the head coach of Rangers.

== Executive career ==
On 4 June 2020, Wigan Athletic announced that the takeover of the club by Next Leader Fund L.P. had been completed. Szeto, who was a friend of Next Leader Fund's General Partner, Au Yeung Wai Kay, was named as a director of the club as part of the takeover. Less than a month later, he voted them into administration.

== Commentator career ==
Szeto began his commentator career in January 2007 for Hong Kong Cable TV.

== Honours ==
Kitchee

- Hong Kong League Cup: 2005–06, 2006–07
- Hong Kong Senior Shield: 2005–06
