= Luk Koon Pong =

Hong Kong footballer (born 1978)

Luk Koon Pong 陸冠邦
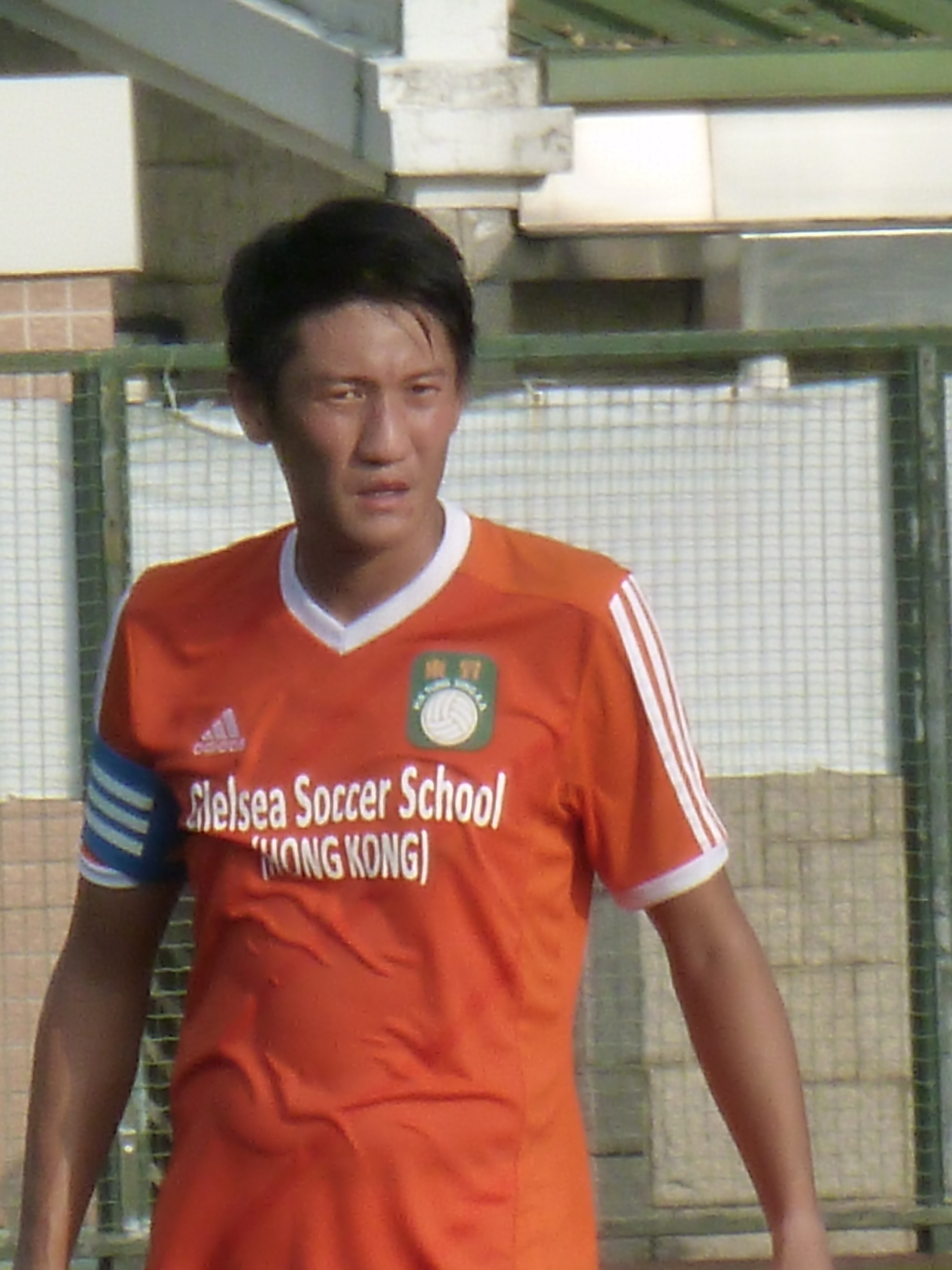
- LUk in 2015

Personal information
- Date of birth: 1 August 1978 (age 48)
- Place of birth: Hong Kong
- Height: 1.80 m (5 ft 11 in)
- Position: Wing-back

Youth career
- 1991–1993: Eastern
- 1993–1996: Rangers (HKG)

Senior career*
Years	Team	Apps	(Gls)
1996–1999	Rangers (HKG)		
1999–2001	Orient & Yee Hope Union		
2001–2006	South China	42	(1)
2006–2008	Kitchee	26	(0)
2008–2012	Pegasus	43	(2)
2016–2018	Happy Valley	46	(17)
2020–2021	CFCSSHK		
2022–2024	CFCSSHK		

International career
1997–1999	Hong Kong U23		
1998–2007	Hong Kong	22	(1)

Managerial career
- 2018–2021: Happy Valley (assistant coach)
- * Club domestic league appearances and goals

Luk Koon Pong (Chinese: 陸冠邦; Jyutping: luk^{6} gun^{3} bong^{1}; born 1 August 1978 in Hong Kong) is a Hong Kong former professional footballer who played as a wing-back.

== Honours ==
Orient & Yee Hope Union

- Hong Kong Senior Shield: 2000–01

South China

- Hong Kong Senior Shield: 2001–02, 2002–03
- Hong Kong League Cup: 2001–02

Kitchee

- Hong Kong League Cup: 2006–07
