= Ross Greer (footballer) =

Australian-born Hong Kong footballer (born 1967)

Personal information
- Date of birth: 23 September 1965 (age 61)
- Place of birth: Perth, Australia
- Position: Midfielder

Youth career
- East Fremantle Tricolore 1981 East Fremantle tricolore 1985 Spearwood dalmatinac

Senior career*
Years	Team	Apps	(Gls)
1988	Floreat Athena		
1989–90	Chester City	2	(0)
1990	Floreat Athena		
1991	South China		
1992–1993	Selangor		
1993–1995	Eastern		
1995–1997	Instant-Dict		
1997	Sorrento		
1997–1998	Melbourne Knights	2	(0)
1998–2001	Sorrento		
2002	Leeming Strikers		

International career
1995	Hong Kong	3	(0)
- * Club domestic league appearances and goals

Ross Greer (born 23 September 1967) is a former professional footballer. He played for Floreat Athena, Chester City, South China, Selangor, Eastern, Instant-Dict, Sorrento, Melbourne Knights and Leeming Strikers before retiring. Born in Australia, he played for the Hong Kong national football team.

== Career ==
Greer's spell playing in The Football League in England in late 1989 with Chester was short-lived. In four first–team games (two in cup football) he failed to find the net for Chester and scored an own–goal in a 2–0 defeat to Shrewsbury Town. He was not awarded a long–term contract.

In 1995, Greer was capped three times for the Hong Kong national football team. He also played briefly for the Hong Kong national cricket team, representing Hong Kong in matches against Singapore and Thailand at the 1993 Tuanku Ja'afar Cup. He had earlier played that sport at under-19 level for Western Australia.
