= Lai Sun Cheung =

Hong Kong footballer and coach

Personal information
- Full name: Lai Sun Cheung
- Date of birth: 1 September 1950
- Place of birth: Hong Kong
- Date of death: 20 June 2010 (aged 59)
- Place of death: Hong Kong
- Position: Defender

Senior career*
Years	Team	Apps	(Gls)
- Hong Kong Rangers
- Happy Valley
- Tung Sing

International career
- Hong Kong

Managerial career
- 1989–2007: Hong Kong U-23
- 2002–2006: Hong Kong
- 2004–2007: Hong Kong 08
- 2007: Hong Kong
- 2007–2008: Hong Kong 09
- * Club domestic league appearances and goals

Lai Sun Cheung (Chinese: 黎新祥; Jyutping: lai^{4} san^{1} coeng^{4}, 1 September 1950 – 20 June 2010) was a Hong Kong football coach and a former professional football player. He was the former head coach of Hong Kong national football team, Hong Kong 08 and the Hong Kong under-23 football team.

Lai joined Rangers when he was Secondary 4. In 1969 & 1970, he joined the Hong Kong Youth Team and participated in youth tournaments in Japan. Then he represented Hong Kong.

From 2002 to 2006, then again in 2007, Lai coached the Hong Kong national football team.

On 20 June 2010, Lai died of lung cancer in Hong Kong, aged 59, after a one-year-battle with the disease.
