= Cheung Sai Ho =

Hong Kong footballer (1975–2011)

Personal information
- Date of birth: 27 August 1975
- Place of birth: British Hong Kong
- Date of death: 22 April 2011 (aged 35)
- Place of death: Tin Shui Wai, New Territories, Hong Kong
- Position: Attacking midfielder

Senior career*
Years	Team	Apps	(Gls)
1994–1995	South China		
1995–1996	Frankwell		
1996–2008	Happy Valley	65	(5)
2008–2010	Wing Yee	33	(3)
2010–2011	Lam Pak	11	(0)

International career
1993–1995	Hong Kong U23		
1995–2007	Hong Kong	56	(8)
- * Club domestic league appearances and goals

Cheung Sai Ho

Chinese name
- Traditional Chinese: 蔣世豪
- Simplified Chinese: 蒋世豪
Transcriptions
Standard Mandarin
- Hanyu Pinyin: Jiǎng Shìháo

Vietnamese name
- Vietnamese: Tưởng Thế Hào

Cheung Sai Ho (Chinese: 蔣世豪; 27 August 1975 – 22 April 2011) was a Hong Kong professional footballer who played as an attacking midfielder.

== Club career ==
In July 2008, Cheung officially announced his retirement from professional football.

== International career ==
In the 1993 Gothia Cup, at the age of 18, Cheung scored the then fastest ever goal on record (2.8 seconds).

On 28 October 2007, Cheung played his last game for Hong Kong during the 2010 FIFA World Cup qualification, where he helped Hong Kong to defeat East Timor 3–2 away and 8–1 at home to advance to the next round.

== Death ==
On 22 April 2011, Cheung committed suicide at the age of 35 by jumping from his home in Tin Heng Estate. The police reported that he was having a dispute with his wife over money and love before the incident.

== Career statistics ==
Scores and results list Hong Kong's goal tally first, score column indicates score after each Cheung goal.

List of international goals scored by Cheung Sai Ho
No.	Date	Venue	Opponent	Score	Result	Competition
1	28 February 2003	Hong Kong Stadium, Hong Kong	Mongolia	4–0	10–0	2003 East Asian Football Championship
2	28 February 2003	Hong Kong Stadium, Hong Kong	Mongolia	5–0	10–0	2003 East Asian Football Championship
3	28 February 2003	Hong Kong Stadium, Hong Kong	Mongolia	10–0	10–0	2003 East Asian Football Championship
4	10 November 2003	Tashkent, Uzbekistan	Thailand	1–0	2–1	2004 AFC Asian Cup qualification
5	11 March 2005	Zhongshan Soccer Stadium, Taipei, Taiwan	Chinese Taipei	5–0	5–0	2005 East Asian Football Championship
6	28 October 2007	Hong Kong Stadium, Hong Kong	Timor-Leste	3–0	8–1	2010 FIFA World Cup qualification
