= Lee Wai Man =

Hong Kong footballer (born 1973)

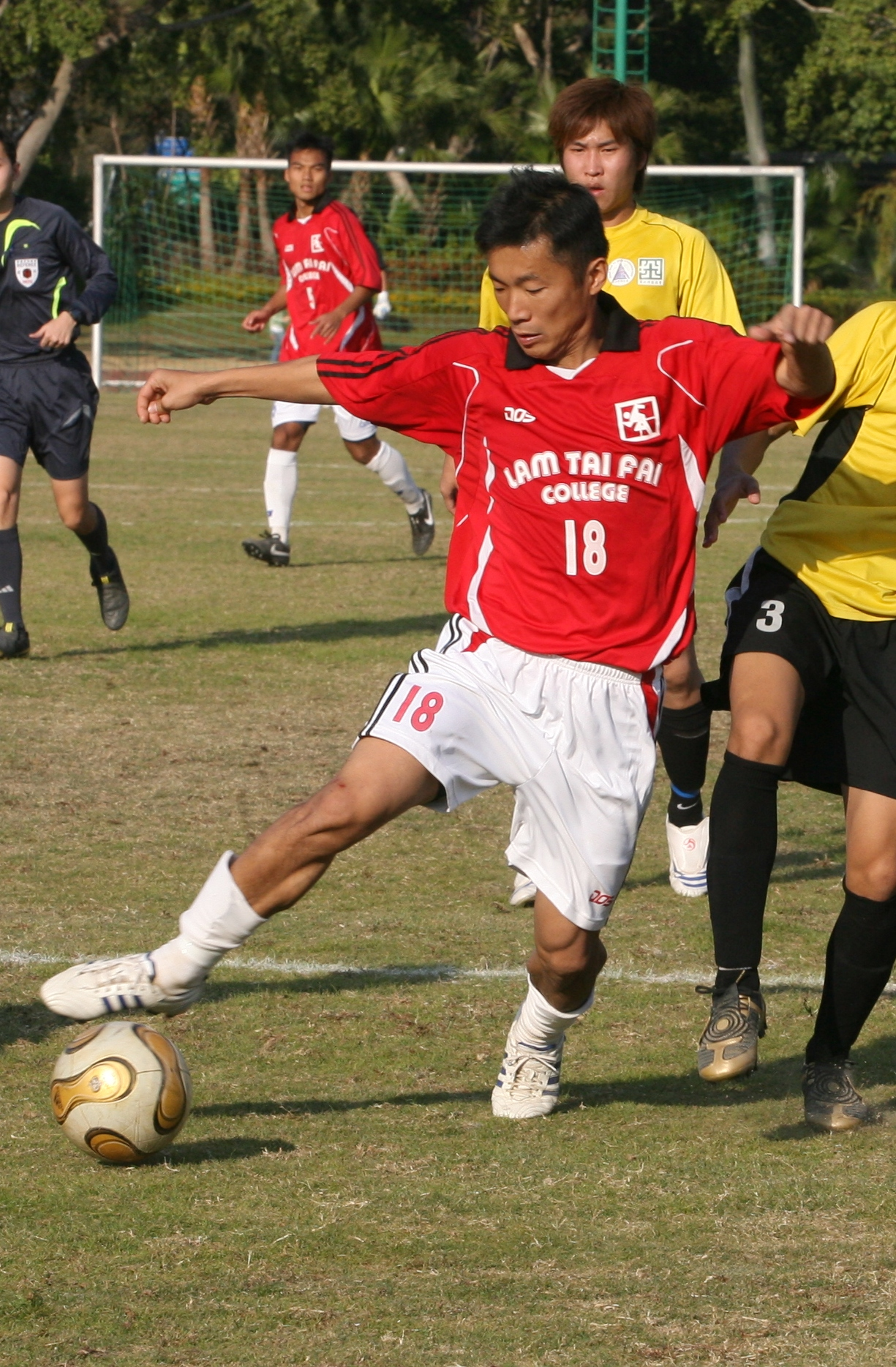

Personal information
- Full name: Lee Wai Man
- Date of birth: 18 August 1973 (age 53)
- Place of birth: British Hong Kong
- Height: 1.78 m (5 ft 10 in)
- Position: Centre back

Team information
- Current team: Sha Tin (caretaker)

Senior career*
Years	Team	Apps	(Gls)
1991–1994	Eastern		
1994–1996	Rangers (HKG)		
1996–1997	Sing Tao		
1997–2007	Happy Valley		
2007–2010	Shatin	22	(3)
2010–2011	Pontic	18	(0)
2012–2021	Shatin	55	(9)
2022–2023	Wing Go	3	(1)

International career
1991	Hong Kong U-23	1	(0)
1993–2006	Hong Kong	68	(2)

Managerial career
- 2007–2009: Shatin
- 2010–2011: Pontic
- 2012–2026: Sha Tin
- 2026: Sha Tin (technical director)
- 2026: Sha Tin (caretaker)
- 2026–: Sha Tin (technical director)
- * Club domestic league appearances and goals

Lee Wai Man (Chinese: 李偉文; Jyutping: lei^{5} wai^{5} man^{4}; born 18 August 1973) is a Hong Kong football coach and former professional footballer who played as a centre back. He is currently the technical director of Hong Kong Premier League club Sha Tin.

== Club career ==
Lee mainly played as a centre back. He has also played in other positions on the field, including goalkeeper, when he moved on to this position urgently after his teammate Leung Cheuk Cheung was dismissed in a match. He announced his retirement from professional football at the end of the 2006–07 season.

== International career ==
Lee achieved the Coca-Cola Outstanding Youth Athlete Award when he was 18, the same year as the Hong Kong cyclist Wong Kam Po. After an impressive performance in his club Eastern, Lee, aged 20, was selected into the final squad for Hong Kong to play in the 1994 World Cup qualifiers. He made his international debut on 23 April 1994 versus Kuwait in a friendly match held in Singapore. Later that year, Lee played all the World Cup qualifier matches (a total of 10 matches) for Hong Kong as a left back.

Although Lee had dropped out of Hong Kong between 1998 and 2000, he returned to play in the first East Asian Football Championship preliminary round for the team as a sweeper. He became the captain of Hong Kong from late 2003 to 2006.

Having 68 international caps in total, Lee is one of the most capped players in the Hong Kong national football team.

== Managerial career ==
On 16 September 2026, Lee was appointed as the caretaker of Sha Tin follownig the departure of Kwok Kar Lok.

== Current status ==
After retirement, Lee became a part-time commentator for TVB. He usually participated in commenting on local football matches and foreign football tournaments, like the highlights of Euro 2008, the Olympic Games Men's Football in 2008 as well as the East Asian Games Men's Football Final in 2009. He was also the head coach of Pontic in the 2010–11 season. Many youth players appreciated his coaching, as he is patient and friendly due to the smaller age gap between him and the youth players.
