= Au Wai Lun =

Hong Kong footballer (born 1971)

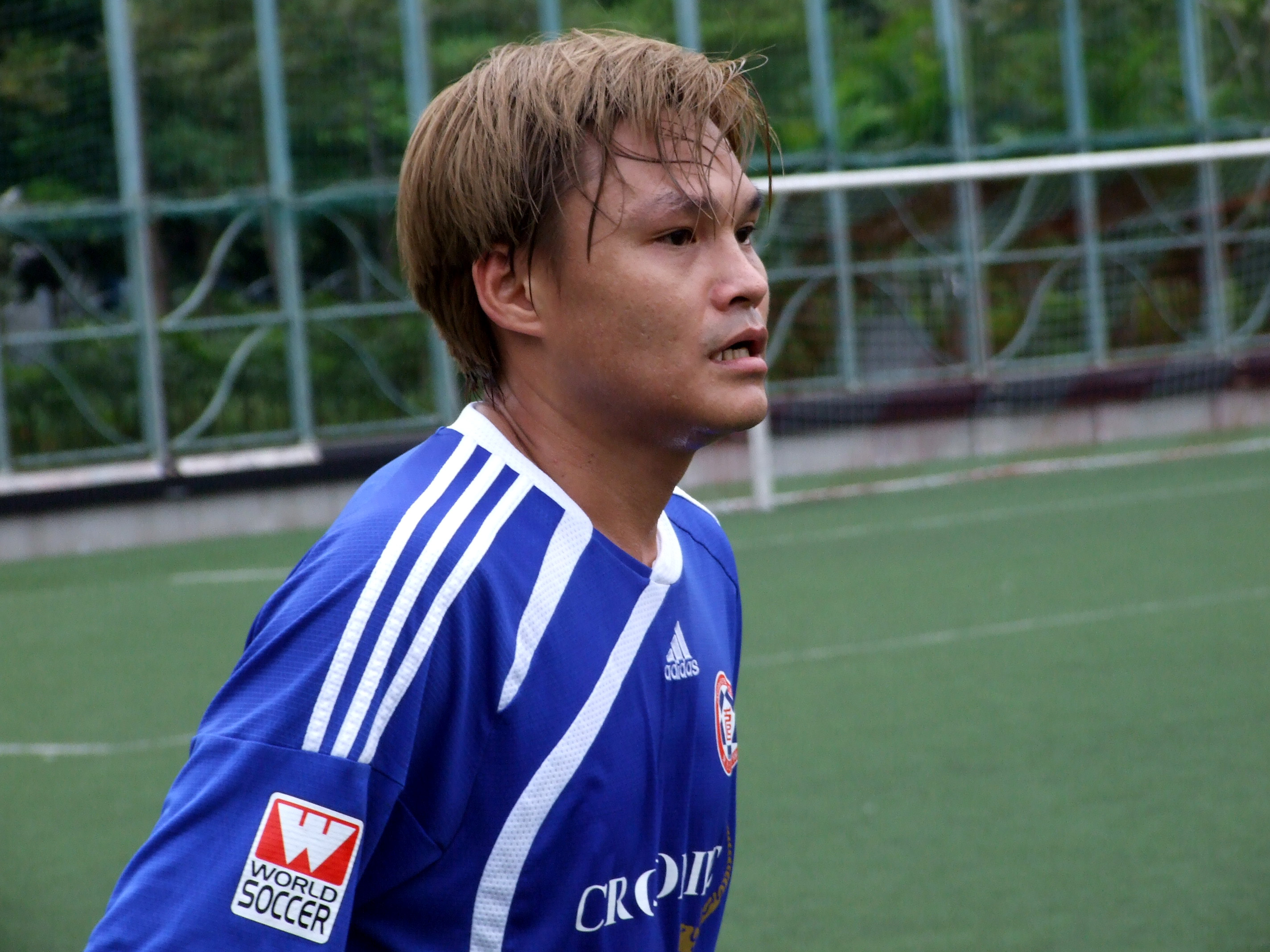

Personal information
- Date of birth: 14 August 1971 (age 55)
- Place of birth: Hong Kong
- Height: 1.81 m (5 ft 11 in)
- Position: Forward

Senior career*
Years	Team	Apps	(Gls)
1988–1989	Tin Tin		(0)
1989–1990	Eastern		(3)
1990–1993	Ernest Borel		(13)
1993–1999	South China		(52)
1999	Rangers (HKG)	0	(0)
1999–2007	South China	114	(80)
2009–2013	Eastern	47	(26)

International career
1989–2005	Hong Kong	50	(26)
1992	Hong Kong (futsal)	3	(3)

Managerial career
- 2017–2019: Dreams FC (technical director)
- * Club domestic league appearances and goals

Au Wai Lun
- Traditional Chinese: 歐偉倫
Transcriptions
Yue: Cantonese
- Yale Romanization: Āu Wáih-lèuhn
- Jyutping: Au^{1} Wai^{5}-leon^{4}

Au Wai Lun (Chinese: 歐偉倫; born 14 August 1971) is a Hong Kong former professional footballer who played as a forward.

== Club career ==
Au made his debut in the Hong Kong First Division League for Tin Tin on 20 December 1988 against Happy Valley. He was 17 years old, and the match ended in a 2–0 defeat.

On the pitch, Au was easily recognised by his hairstyle, often sporting peroxide-blond streaks. He wore the number 7 shirt for South China and captained the team.

A veteran striker, Au was valued for his international experience and strong aerial ability. Standing 1.81 m tall, he was regarded as one of the best headers in the league during his career.

In the 2005–06 season, Au scored 8 league goals. Despite his performances, South China finished 7th, two points above the relegation zone.

In the summer of 2007, after being offered a new contract with a salary reduction, Au decided to retire. He later returned to football as an amateur player for Eastern.

== International career ==
Au was one of the top goal scorers for the Hong Kong national football team. He retired from international football after an exhibition match against Manchester United on 23 July 2005.

He is also remembered for a famous moment in the 2002 Carlsberg Cup final against Honduras, when he passed instead of shooting during a one-on-one opportunity.

== Personal life ==
After announcing his retirement, Au worked with Star Publishing and a professional writer to publish his biography titled Lun · Football Biography (倫．球傳).

== Career statistics ==
=== Club ===
Club	Season	League Apps	League Goals	Total Apps	Total Goals
South China	2005–06	14	8	19	10
South China	2006–07	11	2	17	3

=== International goals ===
No.	Date	Venue	Opponent	Score	Result	Competition
1	7 May 1993	Beirut, Lebanon	Bahrain	2–1	2–1	1994 FIFA World Cup qualification
2	5 June 1993	Seoul, South Korea	South Korea	1–1	1–4	1994 FIFA World Cup qualification
3	1 February 1996	Kowloon, Hong Kong	Macau	1–0	4–1	1996 AFC Asian Cup qualification

== Honours ==
Ernest Borel

- Hong Kong FA Cup: 1991–92
- Viceroy Cup: 1991–92

South China

- Hong Kong First Division League: 1996–97, 1999–2000, 2006–07
- Hong Kong Senior Shield: 1995–96, 1996–97, 1998–99, 1999–2000, 2001–02, 2002–03, 2006–07
- Hong Kong FA Cup: 1995–96, 1998–99, 2001–02, 2006–07
- Hong Kong League Cup: 2001–02

Eastern

- Hong Kong Third Division League: 2010–11, 2011–12

Individual

- Hong Kong Footballer of the Year: 1997, 2006
