= Guangdong Provincial People's Stadium =

Sports venue in Guangzhou, China

Coordinates: 23°07′38″N 113°16′43″E

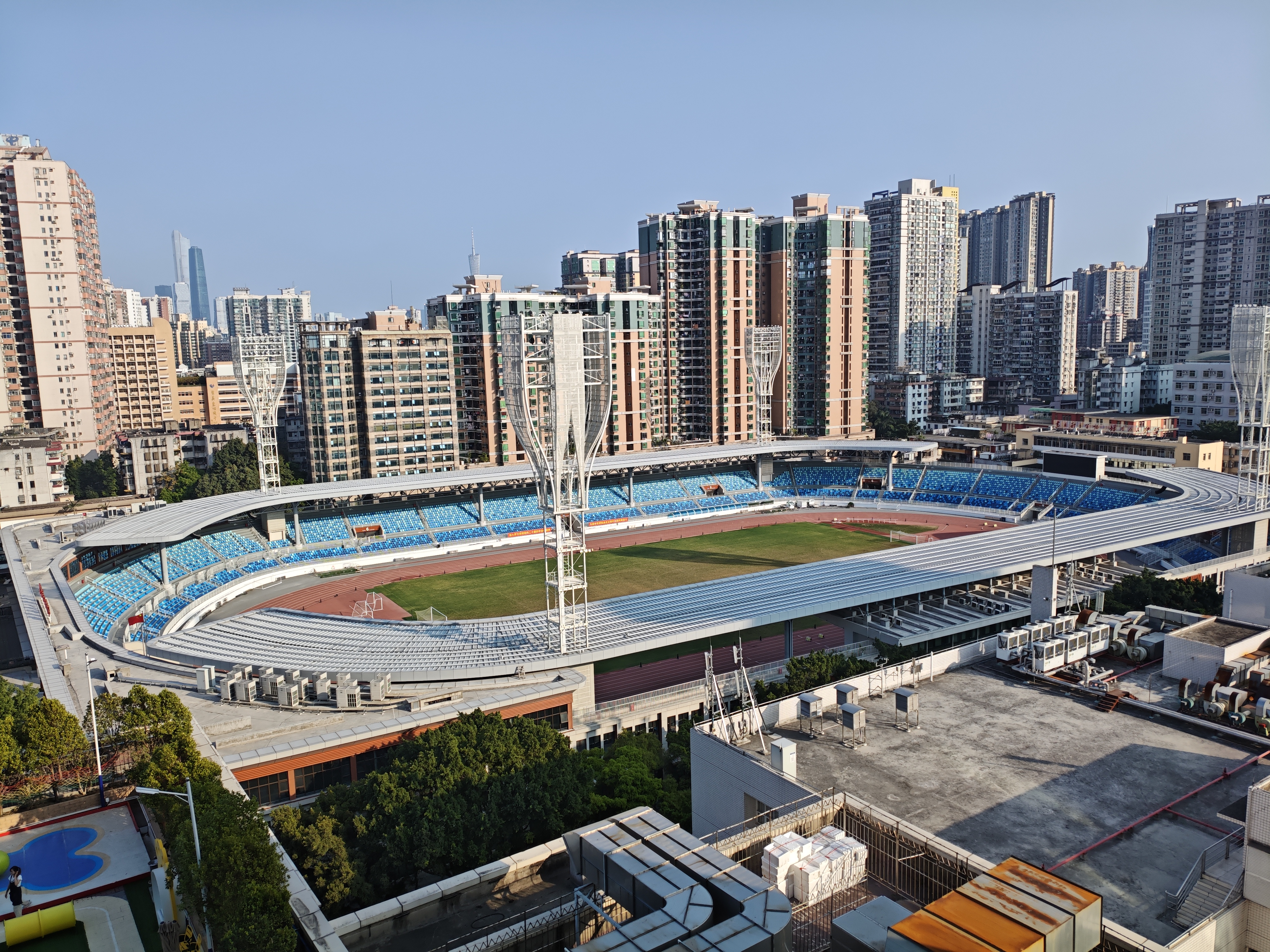
- Interactive map of Guangdong Provincial People's Stadium
- Former names: Guangzhou Public Stadium
- Location: Guangzhou, China
- Owner: Guangzhou Government
- Capacity: 15,000
- Surface: Grass
- Public transit: Martyrs' Park 1

Construction
- Opened: 1932
- Renovated: 1946; 1950s–60s 1990

Tenants
- Guangdong Sunray Cave (2010–2014); Guangzhou Apollo (1998–2000)

The Guangdong Provincial People's Stadium (Chinese: 广东省人民体育场) is a multi-purpose stadium in Guangzhou, China. It is currently used mostly for football matches. The stadium holds 15,000 people. The stadium is best reached by taking Guangzhou Metro Line 1 to Martyrs' Park Station.

== History ==
Formerly known as the 東較場 (Cantonese: dung1gaau3coeng2; English: "Eastern Parade Ground"), the site was first used as a sporting venue in 1906 when it hosted Guangdong's (and China's) first provincial-level athletics competition. Sun Yat-sen ordered the construction of a stadium on the site in 1922; however, it wasn't finished until 1932.

It was used as a Japanese transport and supplies depot during the occupation of Guangzhou and was bombed when Guangzhou was liberated.

The construction of Yuexiushan meant that the People's Stadium didn't hold many high-profile sporting or civic events from the mid-1950s onwards; however, it did host many games in the Guangdong-Hong Kong Cup as well as games in the inaugural Women's World Cup.

=== 1991 FIFA Women's World Cup matches ===
Date	Competition	Team	Res	Team	Crowd
19 November 1991	Group A	Norway	4–0	New Zealand	12,000
19 November 1991	Group A	China	2–2	Denmark	27,000
27 November 1991	Semi-finals	Germany	2–5	United States	15,000
29 November 1991	Third place	Sweden	4–0	Germany	20,000

== Recent use ==
For the 2017 Chinese Super League, Guangzhou R&F used the stadium as their temporary home for their first two matches whilst Yuexiushan was being refurbished.
