= 1978 FIFA World Cup qualification (AFC and OFC) =

Tournament details
- Teams: 21 (from 2 confederations)

Tournament statistics
- Top scorer: (New Zealand) Keith Nelson (7 goals)

The Asian and Oceanian (AFC and OFC) qualification rounds for the 1978 FIFA World Cup took place between 12 November 1976 and 4 December 1977. In total, 21 teams – 19 from Asia and two from Oceania – entered the competition for one place at the finals in Argentina.

Following two rounds of qualifying, Iran qualified for the FIFA World Cup for the first time after finishing first in the final round.

== Background ==
Teams from Asia first took part in qualification for the FIFA World Cup in 1934 when Mandatory Palestine entered. In 1938, the Dutch East Indies became the first team from Asia to qualify after their opponents Japan and the United States both withdrew. Asian teams had limited experience at the World Cup after only the Dutch East Indies in 1938, India in 1950, (Note: India qualified without playing a match but withdrew from the 1950 FIFA World Cup.) South Korea in 1954, North Korea in 1966 and Israel in 1970 had qualified for the finals.

Australia became the first team from Oceania to enter qualification for the FIFA World Cup in 1966. They became the first team from Oceania to qualify for the FIFA World Cup after defeating South Korea in the final round of qualification for the 1974 FIFA World Cup.

In 1974, the Israel Football Association was expelled from the Asian Football Confederation (AFC). For qualification to the 1978 FIFA World Cup, FIFA placed Israel in the Asia and Oceania section.

== Format ==
In the first round, the 21 teams were drawn into five round robin groups of varying sizes. Group 1 was a single round robin group of six teams. Unlike the other groups, the winners and runners-up of Group 1 would play-off for a place in the final round. Groups 2, 3 and 4 were double round robin groups of four teams. Group 5 was a double round robin group of three teams. The winners of Groups 2, 3, 4 and 5 would advance to the final round.

The final round was played as a double round robin. The winner would qualify for the finals.

=== Participants ===
Asia

- Bahrain
- Hong Kong
- Indonesia
- Iran
- Iraq
- Israel
- Japan
- Kuwait
- Malaysia
- North Korea
- Qatar
- Saudi Arabia
- Singapore
- South Korea
- Sri Lanka
- Syria
- Taiwan
- Thailand
- United Arab Emirates

Oceania

- Australia
- New Zealand

== First round ==
=== Group 1 ===
Sri Lanka withdrew prior to the tournament. All matches were played in Singapore. Hong Kong and Singapore advanced to the Group 1 play-off.

==== Table ====
Pos	Team	Pld	W	D	L	GF	GA	GD	Pts	Qualification
1	Hong Kong	4	2	2	0	9	5	+4	6	Advance to Group 1 play-off
2	Singapore	4	2	1	1	5	6	−1	5	Advance to Group 1 play-off
3	Malaysia	4	1	2	1	7	6	+1	4	
4	Indonesia	4	1	1	2	7	7	0	3	
5	Thailand	4	1	0	3	8	12	−4	2	
6	Sri Lanka	0	0	0	0	0	0	0	0	Withdrew

==== Matches ====
27 February 1977

Singapore	2–0	Thailand
Quah Kim Song 48'; Rajagopal 70'

National Stadium, Singapore
Attendance: 55,000
Referee: Tony Boskovic (Australia)
28 February 1977

Hong Kong	4–1	Indonesia
Chung Chor Wai 61' (pen.); Wun Chee Keung 67'; Kwok Ka Ming 71'; Lau Wing Yip 83'		Waskito 12'

National Stadium, Singapore
Referee: Jafar Namdar (Iran)

1 March 1977

Malaysia	6–4	Thailand
James 15', 38', 51', 60'; Isa Bakar 17', 19'		Jesdaporn 24', 67'; Witthaya 86'; Niwat 88'

National Stadium, Singapore
Referee: Vaz (India)
2 March 1977

Singapore	2–2	Hong Kong
Quah Kim Song 37'; Dollah Kassim 70'		Wun Chee Keung 19', 51'

National Stadium, Singapore
Referee: Harries (New Zealand)

3 March 1977

Indonesia	0–0	Malaysia

National Stadium, Singapore
Referee: Asami (Japan)
5 March 1977

Hong Kong	2–1	Thailand
Kwok Ka Ming 49'; Chung Chor Wai 81'		Witthaya 55'

National Stadium, Singapore
Referee: Kim Joo-won (Korea Republic)

6 March 1977

Singapore	1–0	Malaysia
Mohammad Noh Hussein 31' (pen.)

National Stadium, Singapore
Referee: Asami (Japan)
7 March 1977

Thailand	3–2	Indonesia
Cherdsak 27'; Jesdaporn 30' (pen.); Niwat 36'		Risdianto 44'; Junaedi Abdillah 70'

National Stadium, Singapore
Referee: Alex Vaz (India)

8 March 1977

Malaysia	1–1	Hong Kong
Bakri Ibni 78'		Fung Chi Ming 15'

National Stadium, Singapore
Referee: Harries (New Zealand)
9 March 1977

Singapore	0–4	Indonesia
		Ronny Pattinasarany 4'; Anjas Asmara 13'; Andi Lala 26'; Iswadi Idris 48'

National Stadium, Singapore
Referee: Kim Joo-won (Korea Republic)

==== Play-off ====
Lau Wing Yip scored the only goal of the play-off as Hong Kong defeated Singapore and advanced to the final round.

12 March 1977

Singapore	0–1	Hong Kong
		Lau Wing Yip 33'

National Stadium, Singapore
Referee: Tony Boskovic (Australia)

=== Group 2 ===
North Korea withdrew in protest of Israel's participation. South Korea advanced to the final round.

==== Table ====
Pos	Team	Pld	W	D	L	GF	GA	GD	Pts	Qualification
1	South Korea	4	2	2	0	4	1	+3	6	Advance to final round
2	Israel	4	2	1	1	5	3	+2	5	
3	Japan	4	0	1	3	0	5	−5	1	
4	North Korea	0	0	0	0	0	0	0	0	Withdrew

==== Matches ====
27 February 1977

Israel	0–0	South Korea

Ramat Gan Stadium, Ramat Gan
Referee: Brian McGinlay (Scotland)

6 March 1977

Israel	2–0	Japan
Machnes 43'; Bar 57'

Ramat Gan Stadium, Ramat Gan
Referee: Michel Kitabdjian (France)

10 March 1977

Japan	0–2	Israel
		Machnes 41'; Peretz 54'

Ramat Gan Stadium, Ramat Gan
Referee: Verbeke (France)

20 March 1977

South Korea	3–1	Israel
Cha Bum-kun 23'; Park Sang-in 86'; Choi Jong-duk 88'		Malmilian 76'

Dongdaemun Stadium, Seoul

26 March 1977

Japan	0–0	South Korea

National Stadium, Tokyo
Referee: Kathiravalc (Malaysia)

3 April 1977

South Korea	1–0	Japan
Cha Bum-kun 84' (pen.)

Dongdaemun Stadium, Seoul
Referee: Zainal Abidin (Malaysia)

=== Group 3 ===
Iraq withdrew prior to the tournament. Syria withdrew after playing three of their four matches. Their final match, away to Iran, was awarded as a 2–0 defeat. Iran advanced to the final round.

==== Table ====
Pos	Team	Pld	W	D	L	GF	GA	GD	Pts	Qualification
1	Iran	4	4	0	0	8	0	+8	8	Advance to final round
2	Saudi Arabia	4	1	0	3	3	7	−4	2	
3	Syria	4	1	0	3	2	6	−4	2	
4	Iraq	0	0	0	0	0	0	0	0	Withdrew

==== Matches ====
12 November 1976

Saudi Arabia	2–0	Syria
Al Fahad 22'; Bo Saeed 54'

Prince Abdullah al-Faisal Stadium, Jeddah
Referee: Dörflinger (Switzerland)

26 November 1976

Syria	2–1	Saudi Arabia
Al Katbi 36'; Khouri 82'		Ghani 44'

Abbasiyyin Stadium, Damascus
Referee: Doğan Babacan (Turkey)

7 January 1977

Saudi Arabia	0–3	Iran
		Mazloumi 16', 78'; Roshan 62'

Youth Welfare Stadium in Al-Malaz, Riyadh
Referee: Erich Linemayr (Austria)

28 January 1977

Syria	0–1	Iran
		Parvin 36'

Abbasiyyin Stadium, Damascus
Attendance: 22,000
Referee: Robert Fratz (France)

6 April 1977

Iran	2–0 (w/o)	Syria

Tajgozari Stadium, Shiraz

22 April 1977

Iran	2–0	Saudi Arabia
Yousefi 10'; Sharifi 84'

Tajgozari Stadium, Shiraz
Referee: Dörflinger (Switzerland)

=== Group 4 ===
The United Arab Emirates withdrew prior to the tournament. All matches were played in Doha, Qatar. Kuwait advanced to the final round.

==== Table ====
Pos	Team	Pld	W	D	L	GF	GA	GD	Pts	Qualification
1	Kuwait	4	4	0	0	10	2	+8	8	Advance to final round
2	Bahrain	4	1	0	3	4	6	−2	2	
3	Qatar	4	1	0	3	3	9	−6	2	
4	United Arab Emirates	0	0	0	0	0	0	0	0	Withdrew

==== Matches ====
11 March 1977

Bahrain	0–2	Kuwait
		Kameel 5'; Yaqoub 21'

Khalifa International Stadium, Doha
Referee: Pat Partridge (England)

13 March 1977

Qatar	2–0	Bahrain
Muftah 40'; Matter 62'

Khalifa International Stadium, Doha
Referee: Hungerbühler (Switzerland)

15 March 1977

Qatar	0–2	Kuwait
		Yaqoub 28'; Al-Anberi 68'

Khalifa International Stadium, Doha
Referee: Ohmsen (West Germany)

17 March 1977

Bahrain	1–2	Kuwait
Bushager 73'		Al-Anberi 33'; Al Duraihem 56' (pen.)

Khalifa International Stadium, Doha
Referee: Riccardo Lattanzi (Italy)

19 March 1977

Qatar	0–3	Bahrain
		Bushager 32'; Zowayed 57'; Al Farhan 73' (pen.)

Khalifa International Stadium, Doha
Referee: Pat Partridge (England)

21 March 1977

Qatar	1–4	Kuwait
Abubakr 82' (pen.)		Yaqoub 10'; Ma'yoof 16'; Al Saleh 24'; Bo Hamad 60'

Khalifa International Stadium, Doha
Referee: Riccardo Lattanzi (Italy)

=== Group 5 ===
Both matches between Australia and Taiwan were played on neutral territory in Fiji. Taiwan also played their home match against New Zealand in New Zealand. Australia advanced to the final round.

==== Table ====
Pos	Team	Pld	W	D	L	GF	GA	GD	Pts	Qualification
1	Australia	4	3	1	0	9	3	+6	7	Advance to final round
2	New Zealand	4	2	1	1	14	4	+10	5	
3	Taiwan	4	0	0	4	1	17	−16	0	

==== Matches ====
13 March 1977

Australia	3–0	Taiwan
Rooney 8', 46'; Abonyi 16'

Govind Park , Ba, Fiji
Referee: Promakash (Thailand)

16 March 1977

Taiwan	1–2	Australia
Chang Kuo Chi 29'		Kosmina 35'; Abonyi 58'

Govind Park , Ba, Fiji
Referee: Getkaew (Thailand)

20 March 1977

New Zealand	6–0	Taiwan
Nelson 4', 6', 60'; Campbell 16'; Taylor 42'; Weymouth 74'

Mount Smart Stadium , Auckland
Referee: Suppiah (Singapore)

23 March 1977

Taiwan	0–6	New Zealand
		Nelson 10', 74'; Sumner 15', 51', 55'; Lo Chih Tsong 71' (o.g.)

Mount Smart Stadium , Auckland, New Zealand
Referee: Dhillon (Singapore)

27 March 1977

Australia	3–1	New Zealand
Ollerton 60', 80'; Kosmina 72'		Nelson 4'

Sydney Cricket Ground , Sydney
Referee: Chan Tam Sun (Hong Kong)

30 March 1977

New Zealand	1–1	Australia
Nelson 34'		Ollerton 18'

Newmarket Ground , Auckland
Referee: Cheung Kwok Kui (Hong Kong)

== Final round ==
Iran qualified for the 1978 FIFA World Cup.

=== Table ===
Pos	Team	Pld	W	D	L	GF	GA	GD	Pts	Qualification		South Korea	Kuwait	Australia	Hong Kong 1959
1	Iran	8	6	2	0	12	3	+9	14	Qualification for the 1978 FIFA World Cup	—	2–2	1–0	1–0	3–0
2	South Korea	8	3	4	1	12	8	+4	10		0–0	—	1–0	0–0	5–2
3	Kuwait	8	4	1	3	13	8	+5	9		1–2	2–2	—	1–0	4–0
4	Australia	8	3	1	4	11	8	+3	7		0–1	2–1	1–2	—	3–0
5	Hong Kong	8	0	0	8	5	26	−21	0		0–2	0–1	1–3	2–5	—

=== Matches ===
19 June 1977

Hong Kong	0–2	Iran
		Kazerani 22'; Jahani 77', Hong Kong

Government Stadium
Referee: Cesare Gussoni (Italy)

26 June 1977

Hong Kong	0–1	South Korea
		Cha Bum-kun 81' , Hong Kong

Government Stadium
Referee: Ferdinand Biwersi (West Germany)

3 July 1977

South Korea	0–0	Iran , Busan

Busan Gudeok Stadium
Referee: Fute (Scotland)

10 July 1977

Australia	3–0	Hong Kong
Kosmina 28', 84'; Barnes 46', Adelaide

Hindmarsh Stadium
Referee: Hungerbühler (Switzerland)

14 August 1977

Australia	0–1	Iran
		Roshan 70' , Melbourne

Olympic Park Stadium
Referee: Franz Wöhrer (Austria)

27 August 1977

Australia	2–1	South Korea
Kosmina 63', 75'		Cha Bum-kun 23' , Sydney

Sydney Sports Ground
Referee: Jan Keizer (Netherlands)

2 October 1977

Hong Kong	1–3	Kuwait
Chung Chor Wai 9'		Al-Dakhil 35'; Yaqoub 52'; Bo Hamad 72', Hong Kong

Government Stadium
Referee: Martínez (Spain)

9 October 1977

South Korea	1–0	Kuwait
Park Sang-in 59' , Seoul

Dongdaemun Stadium
Referee: Ciacci (Italy)

16 October 1977

Australia	1–2	Kuwait
Rooney 83'		Kameel 42'; Al-Anberi 49', Sydney

Sydney Sports Ground
Referee: Michel Vautrot (France)

23 October 1977

South Korea	0–0	Australia , Seoul

Dongdaemun Stadium
Referee: Ulf Eriksson (Sweden)

28 October 1977

Iran	1–0	Kuwait
Jahani 48' , Tehran

Aryamehr Stadium
Referee: Clive Thomas (Wales)
30 October 1977

Hong Kong	2–5	Australia
Tang Hung Cheong 65'; Chung Chor Wai 80'		Ollerton 19', 31', 65'; Abonyi 39' (pen.); Bennett 85', Hong Kong

Government Stadium
Referee: Ponnet (Belgium)

5 November 1977

Kuwait	2–2	South Korea
Al-Dakhil 47'; Bo Abbas 76'		Cha Bum-kun 18'; Choi Jong-duk 82', Kuwait City

Al Kuwait Sports Club Stadium
Referee: Dubach (Switzerland)

11 November 1977

Iran	2–2	South Korea
Roshan 52', 68'		Lee Young-moo 28', 88' , Tehran

Aryamehr Stadium
Referee: Pat Partridge (England)
12 November 1977

Kuwait	4–0	Hong Kong
Al-Dakhil 3', 17'; Al-Anberi 45'; Kameel 80', Kuwait City

Al Kuwait Sports Club Stadium
Referee: Victor (Luxembourg)

18 November 1977

Iran	3–0	Hong Kong
Jahani 3', 35'; Kazerani 19', Tehran

Aryamehr Stadium
Referee: Raus (Yugoslavia)
19 November 1977

Kuwait	1–0	Australia
Al-Dakhil 52' , Kuwait City

Al Kuwait Sports Club Stadium
Referee: Bucek (Austria)

25 November 1977

Iran	1–0	Australia
Jahani 44' , Tehran

Aryamehr Stadium
Referee: Michel Kitabdjian (France)

3 December 1977

Kuwait	1–2	Iran
Al-Dakhil 14'		Fariba 48'; Khabiri 59', Kuwait City

Al Kuwait Sports Club Stadium
Referee: Malcolm Hall Wright (Northern Ireland)
4 December 1977

South Korea	5–2	Hong Kong
Kim Ho-kon 22'; Huh Jung-moo 43'; Kim Jae-han 76', 81'; Park Sang-in 89'		Kwok Ka Ming 49'; Chan Fat Chi 79', Busan

Busan Gudeok Stadium
Referee: Heinz Aldinger (West Germany)

== Qualified teams ==
Iran qualified for the first time.

Team	Qualified as	Qualified on	Previous appearances in FIFA World Cup
Iran	Final round winners	25 November 1977	0 (debut)

== Goalscorers ==
There were 153 goals scored in 55 matches, for an average of 2.78 goals per match.

7 goals

- (New Zealand) Keith Nelson

6 goals

- (Australia) John Kosmina
- (Australia) Peter Ollerton
- (Kuwait) Faisal Al-Dakhil

5 goals

- (Iran) Ghafour Jahani
- (South Korea) Cha Bum-kun

4 goals

- (Hong Kong) Chung Chor Wai
- (Iran) Hassan Roshan
- (Kuwait) Abdulaziz Al-Anberi
- (Kuwait) Jasem Yaqoub
- (Malaysia) James Wong

3 goals

- (Australia) Attila Abonyi
- (Australia) Jimmy Rooney
- (Hong Kong) Kwok Ka Ming
- (Hong Kong) Wun Chee Keung
- (Kuwait) Fat'hi Kameel Fayaz Matar Marzouq
- (New Zealand) Steve Sumner
- (South Korea) Park Sang-in
- (Thailand) Jesdaporn Naphatalung

2 goals

- (Bahrain) Fuad Abou Shaqr
- (Hong Kong) Lau Wing Yip
- (Iran) Hossein Kazerani
- (Iran) Gholam Hossein Mazloumi
- (Israel) Oded Machnes
- (Kuwait) Hamad Khalid Bo Hamad
- (Malaysia) Isa Bakar
- (Singapore) Quah Kim Song
- (South Korea) Choi Jong-duk
- (South Korea) Kim Jae-han
- (South Korea) Lee Young-moo
- (Thailand) Vidthaya Laohakul
- (Thailand) Niwat Srisawat

1 goal

- (Australia) Murray Barnes
- (Australia) Colin Bennett
- (Bahrain) Ibrahim Al Farhan
- (Bahrain) Ebrahim Zowayed
- (Hong Kong) Chan Fat Chi
- (Hong Kong) Fung Chi Ming
- (Hong Kong) Tang Hung Cheong
- (Indonesia) Junaedi Abdillah
- (Indonesia) Anjas Asmara
- (Indonesia) Iswadi Idris
- (Indonesia) Andi Lala
- (Indonesia) Ronny Pattinasarany
- (Indonesia) Risdianto
- (Indonesia) Waskito
- (Iran) Behtash Fariba
- (Iran) Habib Khabiri
- (Iran) Ali Parvin
- (Iran) Habib Shareefi
- (Iran) Mohsin Yousifi
- (Israel) Haim Bar
- (Israel) Uri Malmilian
- (Israel) Itzhak Peretz
- (Kuwait) Ibrahim Mohammed Al Duraihem
- (Kuwait) Farouk Ibrahim Al Awadi Al Saleh
- (Kuwait) Badr Abdul Hameed Bo Abbas
- (Kuwait) Abdullah Yousuf Ma'yoof
- (Malaysia) Bakri Ibni
- (New Zealand) Clive Campbell
- (New Zealand) Dave Taylor
- (New Zealand) Kevin Weymouth
- (Qatar) Anbar Bashir Abubakr
- (Qatar) Hassan Myuter Saied Al Suwaidi
- (Qatar) Mansour Muftah Faraj Bekhit
- (Saudi Arabia) Samir Sultan Al Fahad
- (Saudi Arabia) Saoud Al Gassem Mohammed Bo Saeed
- (Saudi Arabia) Mohammed Abdul Ghani
- (Singapore) Mohammed Noh Hussein
- (Singapore) Dollah Kassim
- (Singapore) Suriamurthy Rajagopal
- (South Korea) Huh Jung-moo
- (South Korea) Kim Ho-kon
- (Syria) Abdul Hamid Al Katbi
- (Syria) Marwan Khalifa Khouri
- (Taiwan) Chang Kuo Chi
- (Thailand) Cherdsak Chaiyabutr

1 own goal

- (Taiwan) Lo Chih Tsong (playing against New Zealand)

== See also ==
- 1978 FIFA World Cup qualification
- 1978 FIFA World Cup qualification (UEFA)
- 1978 FIFA World Cup qualification (CONMEBOL)
- 1978 FIFA World Cup qualification (CONCACAF)
- 1978 FIFA World Cup qualification (CAF)
