= Football at the 1978 Asian Games – Men's team squads =

Squads for the Football at the 1978 Asian Games played in Bangkok, Thailand.

== Group A ==
=== China ===
Head coach: (China) Nian Weisi

No.	Pos.	Player	Date of birth (age)	Caps	Goals	Club
1	GK	Li Fusheng				
14		He Jia				
4		Lin Lefeng				
3		Liu Zhicai				
2		Xiang Hengqing				
17		Yang Anli				
16		Wang Feng				
6	MF	Chi Shangbin				
11	FW	Rong Zhixing				
18		Li Fubao				
7		Yang Yumin				
15		Shen Xiangfu				
		Liu Jinshan				
		Liu Lifu				
		Wang Changtai				

=== Iraq ===
Head coach: (Iraq) Ammo Baba

No.	Pos.	Player	Date of birth (age)	Caps	Goals	Club
	GK	Raad Hammoudi	1 May 1953 (aged 25)			(Iraq Football Association) Al-Shorta
	GK	Fatah Nsaief	2 February 1951 (aged 27)			(Iraq Football Association) Al Jaish
	DF	Ibrahim Ali	1 July 1950 (aged 28)			(Iraq Football Association) Al-Zawraa
	DF	Hassan Farhan	29 June 1953 (aged 25)			(Iraq Football Association) Al Jaish
	DF	Wathiq Aswad	1 July 1957 (aged 21)			(Iraq Football Association) Al-Talaba
	DF	Nadhim Shaker	18 December 1958 (aged 19)			(Iraq Football Association) Al Tayaran
	DF	Adnan Dirjal	26 January 1960 (aged 18)			(Iraq Football Association) Al-Zawraa
	DF	Abdul-Karim Farhan	26 November 1956 (aged 22)			(Iraq Football Association) Al-Talaba
	DF	Adnan Jafar	29 December 1949 (aged 28)			(Iraq Football Association) Al-Shorta
	MF	Alaa Ahmad	1 January 1952 (aged 26)			(Iraq Football Association) Al-Minaa
	MF	Hadi Ahmed	1 January 1951 (aged 27)			(Iraq Football Association) Al-Minaa
	MF	Dhurgham Mahdi	1 July 1951 (aged 27)			(Iraq Football Association) Al-Sinaa SC
	MF	Hesham Mustafa	1 July 1952 (aged 26)			(Iraq Football Association) Al-Tayaran
	MF	Hussein Ali Thajil	1 July 1958 (aged 20)			(Iraq Football Association) Al Tayaran
	FW	Ali Hussein Mahmoud	1 January 1953 (aged 25)			(Iraq Football Association) Al-Shorta
	FW	Ali Kadhim	1 January 1949 (aged 29)			(Iraq Football Association) Al-Zawraa
	FW	Hussein Saeed	21 January 1958 (aged 20)			(Iraq Football Association) Al-Talaba
	FW	Ahmed Subhi	1 January 1952 (aged 26)			(Iraq Football Association) Al-Amana
	FW	Mahdi Abdul-Sahib	28 July 1956 (aged 22)			(Iraq Football Association) Al-Talaba
	FW	Ara Hamparsum	7 July 1952 (aged 26)			(Iraq Football Association) Al-Amana

=== Qatar ===
Head coach: (Qatar)

No.	Pos.	Player	Date of birth (age)	Caps	Goals	Club
	GK	Mohammad Sami Wafa				
	DF	Mubarak Anbar Al-Ali				
	DF					
	MF					
	DF					
	MF					
	FW					
	FW					
	FW					
	FW					
	FW					

=== Saudi Arabia ===
Head coach: (England) David Woodfield

No.	Pos.	Player	Date of birth (age)	Caps	Goals	Club
1	GK	Salem Marwan				
2	DF	Jasim al-Qartas				
3	DF	Saleh Al-Nu'eimeh				
4	MF	Issa Khalifa Al-Dosari				
5	DF	Tawfiq al-Moghren				
7	MF	Yousef Khames				
8	MF	Saleh Khalifa Al-Dosari				
9	FW	Majed Abdullah				
11	MF	Ahmad al-Saqeer				
12	DF	Ibrahim Tahseen				
13	MF	Fahad al-Habshi				
14	FW	Issa Hamdan				
15	DF	Ahmad al-Nifawi				
18	FW	Sultan bin Naseeb				
19	GK	Ibrahim al-Yousef				
20	GK	Taiseer al-Saqabi				
	FW	Abdullah Abdraboh				
	DF	Saad Breek				
	MF	Issa al-Dosari				
	FW	Saud Jassim				
	MF	Issa Khawaji				
	DF	Wajdi Mubarak				

== Group B ==
=== Burma ===
Head coach: (Myanmar)

No.	Pos.	Player	Date of birth (age)	Caps	Goals	Club
	GK					
	DF					
	DF					
	MF					
	DF					
	MF					
	FW					
	FW					
	FW					
	FW					
	FW					

=== North Korea ===
Head coach: (North Korea) Pak Du-Sok

No.	Pos.	Player	Date of birth (age)	Caps	Goals	Club
1	GK	Kim Gang-Il				
2		Kim In-Chan				
3		Kim Mu-Gil				
4		Cha Jong-Sok				
5		Kim Jong-Min				
6		An Chang-Nam				
7		Hong Song-Nam				
8		Kim Bok-Nam				
9		An Se-Uk				
10		Pak Jong-Hon				
11		Ri Chang-Ha				
17		Kim Mun-Chol				

=== Thailand ===
Head coach: (West Germany) Peter Schnittger

No.	Pos.	Player	Date of birth (age)	Caps	Goals	Club
1	GK	Vasin Masapong				
2		Manus Ratanatisol				
3		Jirasak Chareonchand				
16		Prapan Premsri				
14		Witoon Trikuna				
12		Chamreon Kamnil				
10	FW	Niwat Srisawat				
9		Pichai Kongsri				
13	FW	Boonlert Aeochareon				
18		Vitheechai Sornlak				
11		Somcit Chuayeoomchoom				
15		Kition Laokeukoonpong				
8		Thawiwat Acklasala				

== Group C ==
=== Bangladesh ===
Head coach: (Germany) Werner Bickelhaupt

No.	Pos.	Player	Date of birth (age)	Caps	Goals	Club
	GK	Shahidur Rahman Shantoo (c)	17 November 1947 (aged 31)			(Bangladesh Football Federation) Mohammedan SC
	GK	Moinul Karim Moin				(Bangladesh Football Federation) Sadharan Bima CSC
	DF	Sawpan Kumar Das	10 November 1958 (aged 20)			(Bangladesh Football Federation) Wari Club Dhaka
	DF	Shamsul Alam Manju	14 March 1955 (aged 23)			(Bangladesh Football Federation) Mohammedan SC
	DF	Abul Hossain	2 July 1957 (aged 21)			(Bangladesh Football Federation) Azad Sporting Club
	DF	Mohammad Abu Yusuf	11 September 1957 (aged 21)			(Bangladesh Football Federation) Rahmatganj MFS
	DF	Mostafa Hossain Mukul	12 November 1957 (aged 21)			(Bangladesh Football Federation) Team BJMC
	DF	Zakir Hossain Badal				(Bangladesh Football Federation) Mohammedan SC
	MF	Ashish Bhadra	14 March 1960 (aged 18)			(Bangladesh Football Federation) Rahmatganj MFS
	MF	Kowsar Ali	20 November 1958 (aged 20)			(Bangladesh Football Federation) Team BJMC
	MF	Pranab Kumar Dey Banu				(Bangladesh Football Federation) Mohammedan SC
	MF	Hasanuzzaman Khan Bablu	5 May 1955 (aged 23)			(Bangladesh Football Federation) Brothers Union
	FW	Syed Nazmul Hassan Lovan	20 September 1958 (aged 20)			(Bangladesh Football Federation) Wari Club Dhaka
	FW	Milon Karmakar Basu				(Bangladesh Football Federation) Team BJMC
	FW	Yusuf Buli				(Bangladesh Football Federation) Rahmatganj MFS
	FW	Hassan Ahmedul Haque	2 January 1958 (aged 20)			(Bangladesh Football Federation) Team BJMC
	FW	Mohammed Mohsin	3 April 1963 (aged 15)			(Bangladesh Football Federation) Brothers Union
	FW	Sheikh Mohammad Aslam	1 March 1958 (aged 20)			(Bangladesh Football Federation) Victoria SC
	FW	Enayetur Rahman Khan	28 February 1951 (aged 27)			(Bangladesh Football Federation) Mohammedan SC

=== India ===
Head coach: (India) Arun Ghosh

No.	Pos.	Player	Date of birth (age)	Caps	Goals	Club
	GK	Bhaskar Ganguly				(All India Football Federation) East Bengal
	GK	Bhaskar Maity				(All India Football Federation) Bengal
	GK	Surjit Singh				
	DF	Gurdev Singh Gill (c)	20 April 1950 (aged 24)			(All India Football Federation) East Bengal
	DF	Chinmoy Chatterjee				(All India Football Federation) East Bengal
	DF	Shyamal Banerjee				(All India Football Federation) Bengal
	DF	Compton Dutta				(All India Football Federation) Bengal
	DF	Subrata Bhattacharya	3 March 1953 (aged 21)			(All India Football Federation) Mohun Bagan
	DF	Nicholas Pereira				
	DF	D. Sekaran				
	DF	Gurcharan Singh Parmar				
	MF	Prasun Banerjee	6 April 1955 (aged 19)			(All India Football Federation) East Bengal
	MF	Pushparaj Kumar				(All India Football Federation) Karnataka
	MF	A. Devraj Doraiswamy				(All India Football Federation) Karnataka
	MF	M.M. Jacob				
	MF	Thomas Fernandes				
	FW	Xavier Pius				
	FW	Francis D'Souza				
	FW	Mohammed Akbar				
	FW	Harjinder Singh				(All India Football Federation) JCT Mills
	FW	Surajit Sengupta	30 August 1951 (aged 23)			(All India Football Federation) East Bengal
	FW	Bidesh Ranjan Bose	15 November 1953 (aged 21)			(All India Football Federation) Bengal

=== Malaysia ===
Head coach: (Malaysia) Chow Kwai Lam

No.	Pos.	Player	Date of birth (age)	Caps	Goals	Club
1	GK	R. Arumugam				
22		Jamal Rashid				
4		Yahya Jusoh				
6	MF	Shukor Salleh				
3	DF	Soh Chin Aun				
5	DF	Santokh Singh				
19		Khor Sek Leng				
10	FW	Mokhtar Dahari				
9	FW	Isa Bakar				
12		Bakri Ibni				
11		Ali Abdullah				

== Group D ==
=== Bahrain ===
Head coach: (England) Jack Mansell

No.	Pos.	Player	Date of birth (age)	Caps	Goals	Club
1	GK	Hamood Sultan				
2		Youssef Sharida				
15		Rashid Jamber				
5		Nazir Al-Dirzali				
4		Faisal Sanad				
14		Hamed Mohammed				
10		Ibrahim Suwayed				
9		Khalil Shwayer				
7		Karim Al-Mulla				
11		Mohammed Fahad				

=== Japan ===
Head coach: (Japan) Hiroshi Ninomiya

No.	Pos.	Player	Date of birth (age)	Caps	Goals	Club
1	GK	Mitsuhisa Taguchi	14 February 1955 (aged 23)			(Japan Football Association) Mitsubishi Motors
	DF	Masatoshi Matsunaga	22 December 1950 (aged 27)			(Japan Football Association) Mitsubishi Motors
3	DF	Hiroshi Ochiai	28 February 1946 (aged 32)			(Japan Football Association) Mitsubishi Motors
4	DF	Keizo Imai	19 November 1950 (aged 28)			(Japan Football Association) Fujita Industrial
5	DF	Kazuo Saito	27 July 1951 (aged 27)			(Japan Football Association) Mitsubishi Motors
6	MF	Nobuo Fujishima	8 April 1950 (aged 28)			(Japan Football Association) Nippon Kokan
7	FW	Haruhisa Hasegawa	14 April 1957 (aged 21)			(Japan Football Association) Osaka University of Commerce
8	MF	Mitsunori Fujiguchi	17 August 1949 (aged 29)			(Japan Football Association) Mitsubishi Motors
9	FW	Hiroyuki Usui	4 August 1953 (aged 25)			(Japan Football Association) Hitachi
10	MF	Nobutoshi Kaneda	16 February 1958 (aged 20)			(Japan Football Association) Chuo University
11	FW	Yoshikazu Nagai	16 April 1952 (aged 26)			(Japan Football Association) Furukawa Electric
12	DF	Atsuyoshi Furuta	27 October 1952 (aged 26)			(Japan Football Association) Toyo Industries
	DF	Tsutomu Sonobe	29 March 1958 (aged 20)			(Japan Football Association) Fujita Industrial
14	MF	Hideki Maeda	13 May 1954 (aged 24)			(Japan Football Association) Furukawa Electric
15	MF	Hisashi Kato	24 April 1956 (aged 22)			(Japan Football Association) Waseda University
16	FW	Hiromi Hara	19 October 1958 (aged 20)			(Japan Football Association) Waseda University
17	FW	Masaru Kawaguchi	19 December 1956 (aged 21)			(Japan Football Association) Osaka University of Commerce
	GK	Tatsuhiko Seta	8 January 1952 (aged 26)			(Japan Football Association) Hitachi

=== South Korea ===
Head coach: (South Korea) Ham Heung-chul

No.	Pos.	Player	Date of birth (age)	Caps	Goals	Club
1	GK	Kim Hwang-ho	15 August 1954 (aged 24)			(Korea Football Association) ROK Navy FC
2	DF	Hong Sung-ho	20 December 1954 (aged 23)			(Korea Football Association) POSCO FC
3	DF	Kim Ho-gon	26 March 1950 (aged 28)			(Korea Football Association) Seoul Trust Bank FC
4	DF	Cho Kwang-rae	19 March 1954 (aged 24)			(Korea Football Association) POSCO FC
5	DF	Hwang Jae-man	24 January 1953 (aged 25)			(Korea Football Association) ROK Air Force FC
6	DF	Park Sung-hwa	7 May 1955 (aged 23)			(Korea Football Association) POSCO FC
7	MF	Shin Hyun-ho	21 September 1953 (aged 25)			(Korea Football Association) POSCO FC
8	MF	Cho Young-jeung	18 August 1954 (aged 24)			(Korea Football Association) ROK Navy FC
9	MF	Lee Young-moo	26 July 1953 (aged 25)			(Korea Football Association) POSCO FC
10	FW	Lee Kang-Jo	27 October 1954 (aged 24)			(Korea Football Association) Korea Auto Insurance FC
11	FW	Cha Bum-Kun	22 May 1953 (aged 25)			(Korea Football Association) ROK Air Force FC
12	DF	Choi Jong-Duk	24 June 1954 (aged 24)			(Korea Football Association) POSCO FC
15	MF	Huh Jung-Moo	13 January 1955 (aged 23)			(Korea Football Association) ROK Navy FC
17	MF	Park Sang-in	16 November 1952 (aged 26)			(Korea Football Association) Commercial Bank of Korea FC
18	MF	Kim Sung-nam	19 July 1954 (aged 24)			(Korea Football Association) ROK Navy FC
19	MF	Kim Kang-nam	19 July 1954 (aged 24)			(Korea Football Association) ROK Navy FC
20	FW	Oh Seok-jae	13 October 1958 (aged 20)			(Korea Football Association) Konkuk University
21	GK	Kim Hee-chun	19 October 1955 (aged 23)			(Korea Football Association) ROK Air Force FC
22	DF	Kim Hee-tae	10 July 1953 (aged 25)			(Korea Football Association) ROK Air Force FC
23	GK	Cho Byung-deuk	26 May 1958 (aged 20)			(Korea Football Association) POSCO FC

=== Kuwait ===
Head coach: (Brazil) Mario Zagallo

No.	Pos.	Player	Date of birth (age)	Caps	Goals	Club
1	GK	Ahmed Al-Tarabulsi				
20	GK	Jasem Bahman				
2	DF	Mohammad Abbas				
5	DF	Ibrahim Al-Duraihim				
13	DF	Redha Maarafi				
17	DF	Hussein Al-Jaser				
3	DF	Mahboub Juma'a				
14	DF	Abdullah Mayoof				
11	MF	Hamad Bouhamad				
15	MF	Saud Bouhamad				
6	MF	Saad Al-Houti				
18	MF	Saleh Al-Asfoor				
8	MF	Farouk Ibrahim				
4	MF	Abdullah Al-Buloushi				
12	FW	Badir Bu Abbas				
19	FW	Mohammed Shuaeb				
16	FW	Faisal Al-Dakhil				
9	FW	Jasem Yaqoub				
7	FW	Fathi Kameel				
10	FW	Abdulaziz Al-Anberi				
