= Zhang Hanying =

Chinese women's activist (1872–1915)

Zhang Hanying (Chinese: 張漢英; 1872–1915) was a significant activist in China's women's movement in the early Republican period. Born to a prominent family, she was able to access an education, and she promoted women's suffrage in China, working with the Seventh Conference of All Nation's Women's Suffrage in 1913 and the Women's Suffrage Alliance.

== Early life ==
Zhang Hanying was born in 1872 to a prestigious Hunanese family who were natives of Liling at the Lu River. She and her father had a close relationship, and he encouraged her to advance her intellectual pursuits and seek an education that was rare for girls at that time.

Scholars write that Zhang was a precocious child who often questioned unfamiliar ideas, made strong arguments, and had an "unyielding personality".

== Education ==
Zhang Hanying was among the select few Chinese women who learned public and political engagement skills at the Practical Women's School in Japan in 1905. This school fostered the minds of young radicals of all genders and backgrounds. The school curriculum developed the students' confidence in how they could congregate and express themselves.

Zhang Hanying was one of the first students to participate in this new age of overseas education for Chinese women in Japan. In the late 1800s to early 1900s, there was a strong trend of Japanese schools accepting overseas students. Due to this influx, a male overseas student named Fan Yuanlian convinced Utako Shimoda, the founder of the Practical Women's School, to accept twenty Hunanese Chinese female overseas students to conform with other Japanese schools. Fan also requested for Shimoda to open a branch that would cater to the acceptance of primarily Chinese overseas students, hoping to spread the prospect of education to other provinces in China. Shimoda approved of this initiative in 1905 and accepted the twenty Hunanese students during July of the same year. Zhang Hanying was one of the accepted. The acceptance of this initiative sparked other Chinese provinces such as Liaoning, Jiangxi, and Jiangsu, to send students of their own to Japan.

== Movements ==
After her years at Shimoda's school and during China's political revolution in 1911, Zhang Hanying started to engage in women's rights activism. Other women with whom she collaborated were Lin Zongsu, Tang Qunying, and Wang Changguo.

China's political revolution in 1911 saw Zhang Hanying, among others, seek to add suffrage and phrasing of equality of men and women in the new China Republic constitution. Like Tang Qunying, Zhang believed that journalism was an essential tool for women suffragists to express their political and feminist opinions. She noticed that previous women's journals lacked depth and aimed to create a new newspaper. She set high expectations for her publication, hoping to use it to present the strongest arguments based on the noblest ideals, present accurate news stories, and pay attention to current events both in China and abroad. Zhang hoped her newspaper would adhere to three principles: to limit the power of the government, to supervise the congress, and to maintain a nonpartisan view of all parties, praising those with good policies and criticizing those with bad ones. She believed that the key to women's equality was education, and she sought to establish schools. Zhang also argued for the importance of women's solidarity. "If we each argue in our own languages and accuse each other, how can women have a bright day of our own?"

The chair of the Seventh Conference of All Nation's Women's Suffrage in Budapest in 1913, Nüjie Gonghe Xiejishe (女界共和協濟社), wanted Chinese women to send representatives to the conference to show China's desire to be a part of an international women's movement. The conference assigned Tang Qunying's women's alliance to send and recruit representatives. Qunying had difficulty funding the travel expenses and was almost unable to send women to the conference. Zhang Hanying and Guo Jiangren collaborated with the Chinese Women's Cooperation on the matter and were approved to have half of the travel expenses paid for. In doing so, Zhang had helped bring more Chinese women into the international feminist sphere, thus fostering a national communication network and unified organizations in China.

Radical suffragists like Zhang Hanying also put their wealth and attention to women's handicraft industries. In September 1912, Zhang and others formed the Women's Central Handicraft Factory in Nanjing. The factory produced women's crafts like knitted products and straw hats. Many wanted to use these factories as places to support poor women, a way to create more employment opportunities for women.

== Women's Suffrage Alliance ==
During the 1911 Revolution in China, many women struggled to get their message of equal rights to the masses. Zhang Hanying along with Tang Qunying and Wang Changguo, formed the Shenzhou Canzheng Tongmenghui (Shenzhou Women's Suffrage Alliance) in 1912, which was formerly known as The Women's Northern Expedition Teams and founded in 1911.

Zhang Hanying, Tang Qunying, and Wang Changguo shifted from their Women's Northern Expedition Team into a new group called Shenzhou Women's Suffrage Alliance on February 12, 1912, in Nanjing. Their goals were to promote equal political rights for men and women, equality in marriage and the family, and women's education, and to prohibit concubines. The group initially had more than two hundred followers; many were from the old Revolutionary Alliance with some experience in suffrage. They had branches of the group in other provinces outside of their headquarters in Nanjing.

Within this Alliance, she along with a committee heard from Chinese women about the abusive behavior they faced from their husbands. Then, acting as female judges, they would give rulings to ease these women's minds. This, along with other actions, aimed to not only assist women in distress but to bring domestic abuse into the spotlight.

On February 27, 1912, women representatives Zhang Hanying, Cai Hui (蔡蕙), Ge Wenyuan, Chen Biyin, Tang Qunying, Zhang Mojun, Wang Changguo, Zhang Jiarong, Tong Wenxu, Xu Qing, Cheng Ying, Zhou Yingshui, Wu Zhiying, Yue Yu, Qiu Guixian, Zhang Qunying, Zhou Wenjie, Shi Ruixian, Chen Hongbi (陳鴻璧), and Shen Peizhen (沈佩貞) submitted a letter to the Assembly to add a law that men and women were equal and that women should have the right to vote in the provisional constitution. They argued that after a political revolution, they must guarantee societal equality to avoid a social revolution. They believed that an equal society required women's equal rights and suffrage at its foundation. In the same letter, they rejected that women were not qualified enough to vote and turned that argument around, voicing what makes men qualified for suffrage. This letter emphasized that they sought women's suffrage in China through legal routes, instead of through violent protest.

== Death ==
Zhang died in 1915 in unknown circumstances.
