= 1st Guangdong–Hong Kong Cup =

1979 football competition

Guangdong-Hong Kong Cup 1978–79 is the 1st staging of this two-leg competition between Hong Kong and Guangdong.

The first leg was played in Guangzhou on 21 January 1979 while the second leg was played in Hong Kong Stadium on 28 January 1979.

Guangdong captured the first champion of this competitive by winning an aggregate 4–1 against Hong Kong.

== Squads ==
=== Hong Kong ===
- Coach: (Hong Kong) Lo Tak Kuen (盧德權)

No.	Pos.	Player	Date of birth (age)	Caps	Club
1	GK	(Hong Kong) Chan Wan Ngok (陳雲岳)			(Hong Kong)
2	DF	(Hong Kong) Chan Sai Kau (陳世九) (vice-captain)	26 August 1952 (aged 26)		(Hong Kong) Happy Valley
3	MF	(Hong Kong) Leung Sui Wing (梁帥榮)	22 May 1958 (aged 20)		(Hong Kong) Happy Valley
4	DF	(Hong Kong) Lok Tak Fai (駱德輝)			(Hong Kong)
5	DF	(Hong Kong) Ma Tin Hung (馬天雄)			(Hong Kong)
6	DF	(Hong Kong) Choi York Yee (蔡育瑜)	11 May 1953 (aged 25)		(Hong Kong) Happy Valley
7	DF	(Hong Kong) Poon Cheung Wong (潘長旺)			(Hong Kong)
8	DF	(Hong Kong) Leung Wut Mo (梁活武)			(Hong Kong)
9	MF	(Hong Kong) Li Kwai Hung (李桂雄)	17 May 1953 (aged 25)		(Hong Kong)
10	MF	(Hong Kong) Leung Nang Yan (梁能仁)	2 February 1954 (aged 24)		(Hong Kong)
11	MF	(Hong Kong) Lai Yik Shu (賴翊樞)			(Hong Kong)
12	MF	(Hong Kong) Chan Fat Chi (陳發枝)	10 January 1957 (aged 22)		(Hong Kong)
13	FW	(Hong Kong) Kwok Ka Ming (郭家明) (captain)	30 October 1949 (aged 29)		(Hong Kong) Rangers
14	FW	(Hong Kong) Fung Chi Ming (馮志明)	13 May 1951 (aged 27)		(Hong Kong) Happy Valley
15	FW	(Hong Kong) Wan Chi Keung (尹志強)	1 May 1956 (aged 22)		(Hong Kong) South China
16	FW	(Hong Kong) Sze Kin Hei (施建熙)	26 December 1951 (aged 27)		(Hong Kong)
17	FW	(Hong Kong) Lau Wing Yip (劉榮業)	18 August 1953 (aged 25)		(Hong Kong)
18	GK	(Hong Kong) Ma Pit Hung (馬必雄)			(Hong Kong)
	MF	(Hong Kong) Cheung Ka Ping (張家平)			(Hong Kong)

=== Guangdong ===
Guangdong team consists of 17 players.

- Cai Jinbiao 蔡錦標
- Wu Zhiying 吳志英
- He Jia 何佳
- Chen Xirong 陳熙榮
- Ou Weiting 歐偉庭
- Gu Guangming 古廣明
- Rong Zhixing 容志行
- Yang Fusheng 楊福生
- Ye Xiquan 葉細權
- Du Qing'en 杜慶恩
- He Jinlun 何錦倫
- Xie Zhiguang 謝志光

== Trivia ==
- Ou Weiting of Guangdong team scored after 4 minutes and this is the first goal of the competition.
- Second leg was played on the first day of Chinese New Year.

== Results ==
First Leg

1979-01-21

Guangdong	1 – 0	Hong Kong
Ou Weiting 4'

Yuexiushan Stadium, Guangzhou

Second Leg

1979-01-28
15:15

Hong Kong	1 – 3	Guangdong
Leung Nang Yan 79' (pen.)		He Jia 35'; Gu Guangming 60'; Ou Weiting 73'

Government Stadium, Hong Kong
Attendance: 15,000

== See also ==
- 1979 Lunar New Year Cup
