= Ou Weiting =

Chinese footballer (born 1957)

Ou Weiting 欧伟庭
Personal information
- Full name: Ou Weiting
- Date of birth: 1957 (age 68–69)
- Place of birth: Guangzhou, Guangdong, China
- Position: Left winger

Youth career
- Huanshi West Road
- 1971–1972: Guangdong

Senior career*
Years	Team	Apps	(Gls)
1972–1981	Guangdong		
1984	Guangzhou Baiyun		

International career
1976–1978	China		
- * Club domestic league appearances and goals

Ou Weiting
- Simplified Chinese: 欧伟庭
- Traditional Chinese: 歐偉庭
Transcriptions
Standard Mandarin
- Hanyu Pinyin: Ōu wěitíng
- Wade–Giles: Ōu^{1} wěi^{1}tíng^{2}

Ou Weiting (Chinese: 欧伟庭; pinyin: Ōu wěitíng; born 1957) is a retired Chinese footballer. He played for Guangdong throughout the 1970s, winning many titles for the club. He also represented China internationally for the 1978 Asian Games.

== Club career ==
Ou attended the Huanshi West Road Primary School in Guangzhou throughout his youth career. Despite initially training to become a sprinter, he caught the attention of Guangdong manager Chen Yuliang who would later accept him under the club's youth sector in 1971. By the end of 1972, Ou was promoted to the senior roster alongside Guan Zhirui, Xuan Jieqiu and Chen Xirong as a part of a project by new manager Su Yongshun as a majority of the Guangdong roster were either playing for China internationally full-time or were too old with Su wanting to help develop their younger players. Ou himself began to put more effort into training to where he was able to be a part of the club's Starting XI by 1975. That same year also saw the club take part in the 1975 National Games of China and make the final after a difficult group stage and defeating Bayi on penalties. However, the team ultimately shared the title with Liaoning due to the closing ceremony of the tournament approaching. Ou later participated in the 1st International Football Friendship Invitational Tournament as a member of the China Youth XI due to the team being one of three Chinese delegations for the tournament alongside a first delegation composed of players from Liaoning and a second delegation composed of players from Beijing with the China Youth XI gaining a shock victory in the tournament.

His next major tournament occurred in the 1st Guangdong–Hong Kong Cup after Hong Kong president Henry Fok had wanted to train up the team. During the first home leg of the match held at the Yuexiushan Stadium, at three minutes, after his teammate Rong Zhixing would successfully avoid the defenders, passed the ball to Ou who was already waiting within the penalty zone. Without any hesitation, Ou shot a volley straight into the farthest area in the post at just four minutes with the goal ultimately being the winning goal of the match. The second legged match at the Government Stadium saw Ou score the third goal in a 1–3 victory, securing the title. He also took part in the 1979 National Games of China where he took part in eliminating Shanghai in the quarterfinals through penalties. Despite losing 2–1 against Shandong after a goal by Liu Chengde, the team would achieve third place after defeating Hebei 2–0. Guangdong ultimately got their revenge against Shandong at the 1979 National Football Jia League, defeating the team 3–0 and later achieving their first national title. He also played in a friendly against German club Hamburger SV, scoring a goal in a 3–3 draw. Ou remained in Guangdong until his retirement in August 1981 but briefly returned three years later for the 1984 Chinese FA Cup to represent Guangzhou Baiyun.

== International career ==
Ou was called up to first represent China for the upcoming 1976 AFC Asian Cup. Despite being named in the preliminary rosters however, he was ultimately left out of the final roster for the tournament as China went on to achieve third place in the tournament. His international career didn't end after that however as China manager Nian Weisi would include him in the roster that went on an international tour to play a series of friendlies against North Korea, United States. Jamaica and Mexico. He had a far greater role in the 1978 Asian Games as he made the final roster for the tournament. Despite that however, he was ultimately used as a substitute player for Shen Xiangfu.

== Later life ==
Ou chose to remain active in football, becoming a coach at the Liwan District Amateur Sports School. During the 2010 Asian Games torch relay, Ou was chosen as the first sprinter to run 1.6 km across his home district of Liwan. He also remains active in the Guangdong–Hong Kong Cup, attending the 42nd Guangdong–Hong Kong Cup alongside various other Guangdong footballers of his generation following a five year hiatus.
