= Xuan Jieqiu =

Chinese footballer (born 1954)

Xuan Jieqiu 禤洁球
Personal information
- Full name: Xuan Jieqiu
- Date of birth: 1954 (age 71–72)
- Place of birth: Guangzhou, Guangdong, China
- Positions: Midfielder; inside forward

Youth career
- 1971–1972: Guangdong

Senior career*
Years	Team	Apps	(Gls)
1972–1980	Guangdong		

International career
1975	China U20	4	(0)
- * Club domestic league appearances and goals

Xuan Jieqiu
- Simplified Chinese: 禤洁球
- Traditional Chinese: 禤潔球
Transcriptions
Standard Mandarin
- Hanyu Pinyin: Xuān jiéqiú
- Wade–Giles: Xuān ^{1} jié^{1}qiú^{2}

Xuan Jieqiu (Chinese: 禤洁球; pinyin: Xuān jiéqiú; born 1954) is a retired Chinese footballer. Nicknamed "Qiuzai", he played as a midfielder and inside forward for Guangdong throughout the 1970s. He also represented China internationally for the 1975 AFC Youth Championship.

== Club career ==
Xuan was born in 1954 as the son of Xuan Huiquan who was a footballer within Guangzhou throughout the 1950s and helped develop his son's skills. After being accepted into the youth ranks of Guangdong, he was promoted by manager Chen Hanlin in late 1972 alongside He Jia, Chen Xirong, Guan Zhirui and Ou Weiting. Due to having relatives in Hong Kong, Xuan had access to Western football magazines which were a rarity in the rest of China at the time which led to new Guangdong manager Su Yongshun to borrow them to integrate them into Guangdong's tactical and technical composition. Thus, upon the revived 1973 National Football League, Guangdong initially did extremely well though after a critical underestimating of Xinjiang in the 6th round resulted in a shock loss. However, the following match against Anhui saw Xuan save the team from defeat after scoring two successive goals within the last 10 minutes of the match. Throughout his career, Xuan was part of the winning squads for the 1975 National Games of China, the 1979 National Football Jia League and achieved third place at the 1979 National Games of China before moving to Macau in 1980.

== International career ==
Xuan was called up by manager Zhang Honggen to represent China U20 at the 1975 AFC Youth Championship. The Dragons went on to make it to the second round but lost to North Korea in the second round by 0–1.
