= Women's Suffrage Alliance =

Chinese women's rights organisation

The Women's Suffrage Alliance (simplified Chinese: 女子参政同盟会; traditional Chinese: 女子參政同盟會; pinyin: Nǚzǐ cānzhèng tóngménghuì) was a Chinese women's rights organisation, founded 20 February 1912. Its purpose was to work for the introduction of women's rights and women suffrage. It was the first national women's suffrage organisation in China, and the start of the first organised suffrage movement in China.

== Foundation ==
It was founded by Tang Qunying (founder of the Women's Support Association) in Nanjing 20 February 1912. At the time, the Chinese Empire had been abolished and the Constitution of the new Republic of China was due to be written. Women activists were concerned that women's equal rights and suffrage be included in the constitution of the new republic. When there were signs that this was not the case, women organized under Tang Qunying to lobby their cause to the Parliament. It was an umbrella organisation comprising the women's associations Nüzi canzheng tongzhi hui, 女子尚武會; Nüzi shang wu hui, Nüzi houyuan hui, Hunan nüguomin hui and 女子同盟會; Nüzi tongmenghui; 'Women's League', and among its founding members were Zhang Hanying, Lin Zongsu (chair of the Shanghai Women's Political Consultative Conference), Wang Changguo (promoter of Hunan Changsha Women's National Association), Shen Peizhen (沈佩貞; chair of the Shanghai Women's Shangwu Association), Chen Hongbi (陳鴻璧; chair of the Shanghai Aihua Company), Wu Mulan (吳木蘭; chair of the Shanghai Women's League), Zhang "Sophie" Zhaohan, He Xiangning and Cai Hui (蔡蕙), with Tang Qunying as its president.

== Activity ==
When the new constitution was presented to the parliament 11 March 1912 and did not include women suffrage, the suffragists left their seats in the gallery and stormed the parliamentary sets in demonstration. The next day, they were barred from entering and organised a demonstration to protest. In April 1912, they organised a congress and printed a manifesto of suffrage which was distributed across China. When male suffrage was passed in parliament 10 August 1912, sixty suffragists stormed the parliament in protest.

President Sun Yat-sen supported the demands of the organisation, but informed Tang Qunying that despite his personal support, it was impossible to get her demands through parliament because the majority was against them, and advised her to view women suffrage a long-term goal which had to be postponed, and instead focus on making women ready for suffrage at a later date by making better education available for them. President Yuan Shikai proved to be much more hostile to women's rights: in March 1913, he banned the Women's Suffrage Alliance and issued an arrest warrant for Tang Qunying, which was to be the end of the first wave of women suffrage activism in China.

== Goals and reforms ==
The Women’s Suffrage Alliance's regulations identified equality between women and men and women's participation in politics as its main goals. In order to achieve these long-term goals, the Alliance began preparation to establish Nanyang Women’s Political and Legal University in Beijing in November 1912.

In its Nanjing conference on 8 April 1912, the Alliance put forward a manifesto with eleven reforms. Women and men should have equal rights, women should be educated universally, and family traditions should be changed. The manifesto required that slave and servant girl trading should be stopped, monogamy should be supported and divorce without good reason should be prohibited, and women should have more freedom to choose their husbands gradually. Women should be allowed to work in various professions and charitable institutions should be developed. The manifesto promoted the abolition of foot binding, reform of customs related to women’s clothing, and prohibition of prostitution.

The Alliance considered education of women, professions for women, family life, women’s physical health, and their status in society. According to Edwards, by opposing foot binding, restrictive clothing customs, and prostitution, women’s physical and moral well-being was considered. In addition, Edwards states that the suffragists stressed their moral decency in order to differentiate themselves from prostitutes and still relied on the traditional notion of female virginity.

== Political opposition and dissolution ==
In August 1912, when the Revolutionary Alliance united with four other political parties to form the Nationalist Party, the Women's Suffrage Alliance faced opposition. During this process, the new party removed the principle of gender equality from its manifesto. Tang Qunying and Shen Peizhen decided to oppose this decision. At a meeting on August 14, they questioned why gender equality was no longer included in the manifesto. They argued that women participated in the 1911 Revolution and should not be excluded from political rights.

On August 27, 1912, Tang Qunying and other women again demanded that the Nationalist Party include gender equality in its manifesto, but only a small number of members supported this proposal. In September, Tang Qunying and Shen Peizhen met with Sun Yat-sen to discuss the issue. Sun later explained in a letter to Tang that the decision to remove gender equality from the party's manifesto was a majority's decision. He suggested that she focus on women's education so that women could better prepare for the struggle for the right to vote.

The Women's Suffrage Alliance continued to face difficulties under Yuan Shikai's government. In November 1913, the Yuan Shikai government dissolved the alliance and placed Tang Qunying on the wanted list. During this period, many progressive women's magazines also disappeared. In March 1914, new police regulations restricted women's participation in political organizations and public meetings. Women‘s law and political schools were also closed. These measures further restricted women's political activities after the alliance's dissolution.

== Aftermath ==
During the presidency of Yuan Shikai and the following years of fragmentation in China, no national women's movement was possible. In some parts of China, however, local women's movements organised after the foundation of Nujie lianhe hui (UWA) in 1919, and managed to introduce women suffrage in the local constitutions of Hunan and Guangdong (1921) and Sichuan (1923), were women were elected to the local parliaments. When China was unified under the Kuomintang Government in Nanjing in 1928, a national women's movement could organise again for the first time since the closure of the Women's Suffrage Alliance in 1913, and women's suffrage was finally included in the new Constitution of 1936, although the constitution was not implemented until 1947.
