= Yang Fusheng =

Chinese footballer (born 1954)

Yang Fusheng 杨福生
Personal information
- Full name: Yang Fusheng
- Date of birth: 1955 (age 70–71)
- Place of birth: Guangzhou, Guangdong, China
- Position: Goalkeeper

Youth career
- ???–1973: Beijing Sport University

Senior career*
Years	Team	Apps	(Gls)
1973–1980	Guangdong		

International career
1975	China U20	1	(0)
- * Club domestic league appearances and goals

Yang Fusheng
- Simplified Chinese: 杨福生
- Traditional Chinese: 楊福生
Transcriptions
Standard Mandarin
- Hanyu Pinyin: Yáng fúshēng
- Wade–Giles: Yáng^{1}fú^{1}shēng^{2}

Yang Fusheng (Chinese: 杨福生; pinyin: Yáng fúshēng; born 1955) is a retired Chinese footballer. He played as the main goalkeeper for Guangdong throughout the 1970s, winning many titles for the club. He also represented the China U20 team internationally in 1975.

== Club career ==
Unlike many other Chinese footballers of the 1970s, Yang caught the attention of the Beijing Sport University as he was admitted into the school. In 1973, Chinese domestic football commenced play once again but due to league restrictions at the time, there was a limited registration quota per club with Guangdong's goalkeepers for the 1973 National Football League being Xu Huafu and Ma Weibin. However, both goalkeepers were unable to register for the second quota of the season, causing Chen Wende to be the only remaining goalkeeper for the club. This in turn, caused Guangdong manager Su Yongshun to immediately sign Yang for the senior team despite his young age. Yang's first taste of success was seen at the 1975 National Games of China where he served as the starting goalkeeper and during the final, after a long match against Liaoning that ended in 1–1 draw, both teams ultimately shared the title. He also played in the following 1979 National Games of China where the club earned third place and was part of the winning squad for the 1979 National Football Jia League. 1980 saw younger goalkeepers such as Yang Ning and Wei Xiaole appear in the Guangdong roster and despite only being 25, Yang chose to retire as he turned his focus towards the Yuexiu Mountain Amateur Sports School where he served as a coach specializing in defensive plays in goalkeeping to promote future generations of goalkeepers in China.

== International career ==
1975 saw the German U20 team visit China in a series of friendlies. Throughout the tour, they had beaten Shanghai 5–0 and drew the senior China national football team 1–1. Thus, the match against the China U20 saw Yang as a substitute goalkeeper to Xu Huafu with the match going in favor to the Dragons after a goal by He Jia. However, after Xu saved a goal, he was kicked severely by the opposing forward to the point of having to be rushed to the hospital. This resulted in Yang being called up despite only being 18 at the time and defended the lead, blocking many attempted goals through either vicious attacks and commanding the defense in defecting corner kicks with the final score remaining 1–0. Despite the upset victory, Yang was not called up for the national team again.

== Later life ==
In 2000, Yang emigrated to the United States and in 2005, played with Yang Ning to win that year's North American Chinese Games with many Chinese Americans often visiting Yang due to his status as Guangdong's goalkeeper of the 1970s. He currently teaches football and opened a new school in the United States, teaching children in both Mandarin and Cantonese.
