= 2010 Asian Games torch relay =

- Host city: Guangzhou, China
- Distance: 2228.3 km
- Torch bearers: 2,307
- Start date: 12 October 2010
- End date: 12 November 2010

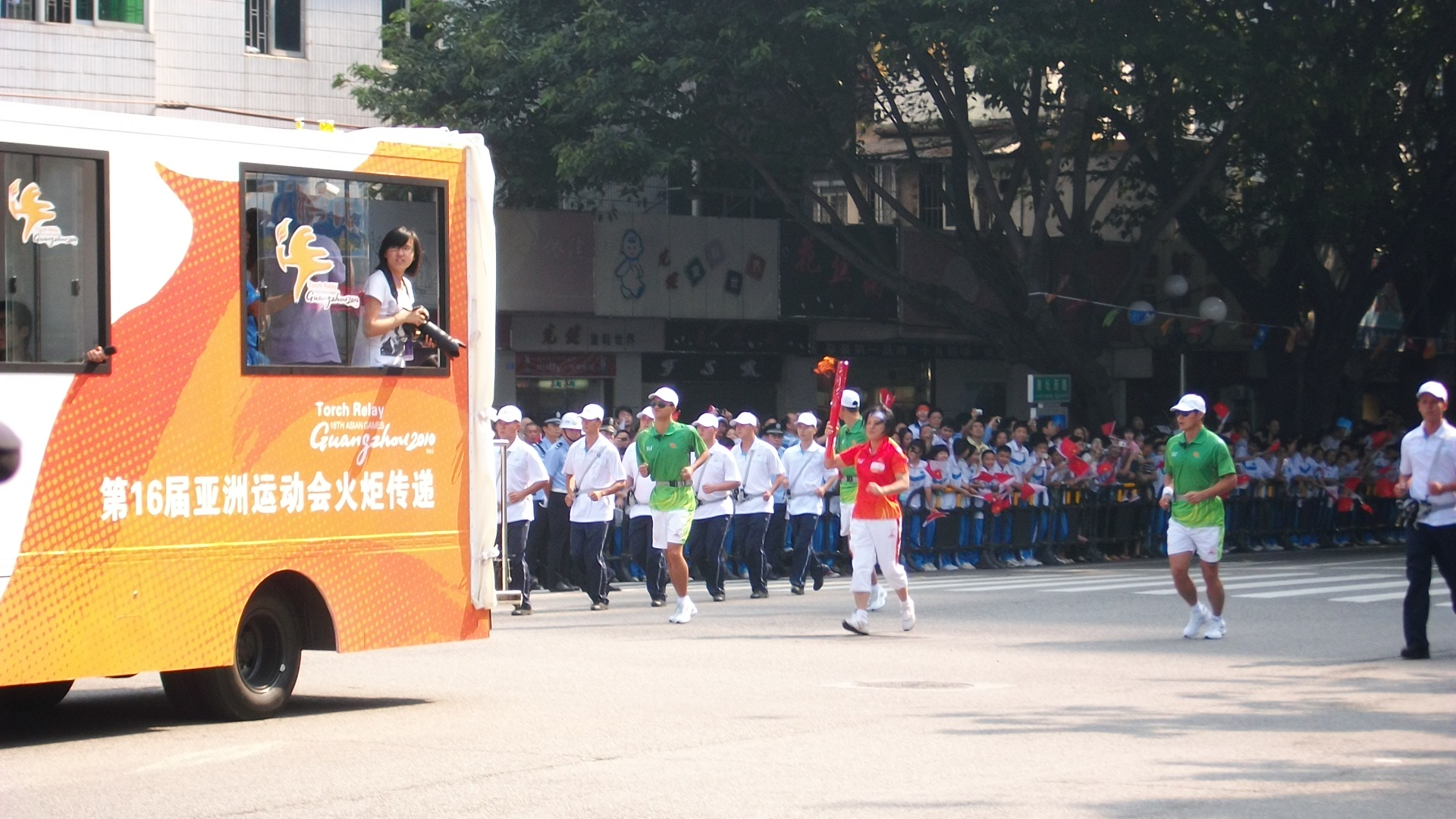
2010 relay scene at Huizhou

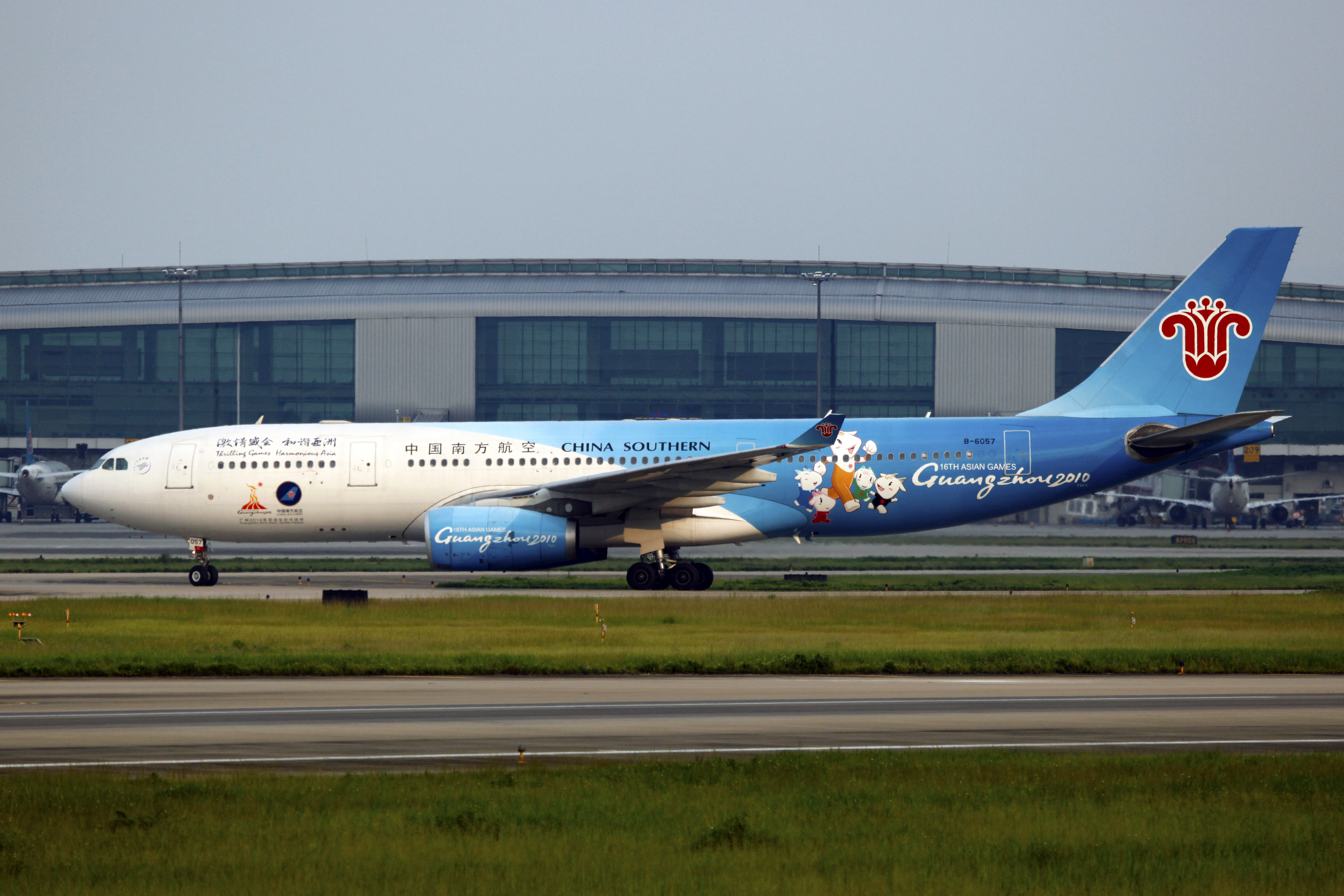
"Flight Guangzhou 2010" torch relay jet (Registration B-6057)

The 2010 Asian Games torch relay was held from October 12, 2010 through 21 cities in Guangdong province and 2 cities outside the province before the opening ceremony on November 12, 2010. Prior to the relay, a lighting ceremony was held back on October 9, 2010. Some 2,068 torchbearers were expected to carry the torch. The relay leg in Harbin was held in a minor scale due the climatic conditions, as the leg was held inside the main venue of the 1996 Asian Winter Games complex, the Harbin Ice Hockey Rink, while the relay on October 15, 2010 was affected by Typhoon Megi as it was held under the rain. The leg held from November 6–8 acted as a test relay. The flame travelled across China aboard a China Southern Airlines Airbus A330-200 named "Flight Guangzhou 2010" (Registration B-6057), with the airline company being the official partner of the games.

== Torch ==
Two torch designs were short-listed in September 2009 for the 2010 Asian Games. "The Tide" (Chinese: 潮流; pinyin: Cháoliú) was chosen by the organisers as the torch of the Games, defeating the "Exploit" design. The Tide weighs 98 g and is 70 cm long, and is tall and straight in shape, while dynamic in terms of image. The secondary official mark of the torch relay was unveiled on July 15, 2010, featuring a silhouette of a running goat holding a torch.

== Lighting ceremony ==
On October 9, 2010, the flame lighting ceremony was held at the Juyongguan pass at the Great Wall of China near Beijing. A 22-year-old Yunnan Arts University student Kang Chen-chen (Chinese: 康辰晨; pinyin: Kāngchénchén) was chosen to light the torch. The condition at the time of the lighting was foggy, while she tried to light the torch with a solar mirror with little sunlight. Therefore, it took upwards of 2 minutes before the torch flame could come up. Kang received quite a bit of media attention afterwards. Most of it praised the way she handled the situation. The ceremonial cauldron was then lit-up by president Hu Jintao.

== Route ==
Torch relay stops outside of Guangdong 2010 Asian Games torch relay route within Guangdong
Date	City	Length	Notable torchbearers	Number of torchbearers
October 12	Beijing Temple of Heaven		Zhang Lin (张琳) – Olympic silver medalist swimmer Li Ning (李宁) – Olympic gold medalist gymnast Xu Haifeng (许海峰), Yang Ling (杨凌) – Olympic gold medalist shooter Xian Dongmei (冼东妹) – Olympic gold medalist judo Zhang Yimou (张艺谋) – film director	36
October 13	Zhongshan	11.2 km	Yang Wei (杨维) – Olympic gold medalist badminton player Feng Kun (冯坤) – Olympic gold medalist volleyball player Zhou Bichang (周笔畅), Leo Ku (古巨基) – singer Liang Wen-Chong – golfer Jiang Jialiang – table tennis player Sun Bisheng (孙必胜) – great grandnephew of Sun Yat-sen	80
October 14	Harbin, Heilongjiang	–	Jin Fengling (金凤玲) – ice hockey player Wang Fei (王霏) – speed skater Huang Xintong (黄欣彤), Zheng Xun (郑汛), Yu Xiaoyang (于小洋), Wang Chen (王晨) – figure skater Zhang Dan (张丹), Zhang Hao (张昊) – Olympic gold medalist figure skater	21
October 15	Changchun, Jilin	1.2 km	–	16
October 15	Haiyang, Shandong	2.012 km	Xing Aowei (邢傲伟) – Olympic gold medalist gymnast	16
October 16	Zhuhai	8.9 km	Zeng Qiliang (曾启亮) – Asian Games gold medalist swimmer Li Yongbo (李永波) – badminton coach He Zhuoqiang (何灼强) – gold medalist weightlifter	80
October 17	Dongguan	8 km	Du Feng (杜锋), Chen Jianghua (陈江华), Zhu Fangyu (朱芳雨), Wang Shipeng (王仕鹏) – basketball player Zhang Guoying (张国英) – swimmer	80
October 18	Shenzhen	8 km	Liu Gang (刘刚) – shooter	80
October 19	Huizhou	9.4 km	Wang Zhizhi (王治郅) – basketball player Gu Li (古力) – Go champion Li Shasha (刘莎莎) – pool player	80
October 20	Shanwei	8.4 km	–	80
October 21	Shantou	8 km	Liu Xiaosheng (刘孝生) – sprinter	80
October 22	Chaozhou	7 km	–	80
October 23	Jieyang	7.3 km	Sun Shuwei (孙淑伟) – Olympic gold medalist diver Xu Yinchuan (许银川) – chess champion	80
October 24	Meizhou	8 km	Chen Qiuqi (陈秋琦) – Olympic silver medalist field hockey player Zeng Xuelin (曾雪麟) – football manager	80
October 25	Heyuan	9.6 km	Ye Qiaobo (叶乔波) – Olympic silver medalist speed skater	80
October 26	Rest day			
October 27	Shaoguan	10.8 km	Yang Jinghui (杨景辉) – Olympic gold medalist diver	80
October 28	Qingyuan	8 km	Xie Xingfang (谢杏芳) – Olympic silver medalist badminton player	80
October 29	Zhaoqing	8.8 km	Liu Haitao (刘海涛) – canoer	80
October 30	Yunfu	8 km	Zou Shiming (邹市明) – Olympic gold medalist boxer	80
October 31	Maoming	7.6 km	–	78
November 1	Zhanjiang	10 km	Lao Lishi (劳丽诗), Hu Jia (胡佳) – Olympic gold medalist diver	80
November 2	Yangjiang	8 km	–	80
November 3	Jiangmen	7.1 km	Li Shanshan (李珊珊) – Olympic gold medalist gymnast	80
November 4	Foshan	8 km	Huang Liping (黄力平) – Olympic silver medalist gymnast Zhang Jiewen (张洁雯) – Olympic gold medalist badminton player Sha Baoliang (沙宝亮) – singer	80
November 5	Square of Guangzhou municipal gate	Flame division ceremony		
November 6	Yuexiu	1.2 km	–	16
November 6	Panyu	–	–	16
November 6	Tianhe	1 km	Wei Wei (魏伟) – basketball player	16
November 6	Nansha	2.5 km	–	16
November 7	Luogang	1.5 km	–	16
November 7	Huadu	2 km	–	16
November 7	Zengcheng	2 km	Liu Xiuhua (刘秀华) – weightlifting champion	16
November 7	Conghua	0.5 km	–	16
November 8	Liwan	1.8 km	Ou Weiting (欧伟庭) – ex-footballer	16
November 8	Baiyun	1.1 km	Dong Wenfeng (董文峰) – sailing champion	16
November 8	Haizhu	–	Wu Lingmei (伍岭梅) – triple jump champion Kong Guoxian (孔国贤) – ex-footballer	16
November 8	Huangpu	–	–	16
November 9	Downtown Guangzhou	18 km	Yang Yilin (杨伊琳) – Olympic gold medalist gymnast Yu Zaiqing (于再清) – Vice President of International Olympic Committee (IOC); Lin Musheng (林木声) – vice mayor of Guangzhou; Yang Naijun (杨迺军) – Director General of the Administration of Sports of Guangdong Province; Li Ziliu (黎子流) – mayor of Guangzhou; Zhou Jiawei (周嘉威) – swimmer Su Wanwen – fencer Timothy Fok (霍震霆) – Vice President of Olympic Council of Asia (OCA); Song Zuying (宋祖英) – singer Wang Yifu (王义夫) – Olympic gold medalist shooter Zhou Yangjing (周杨静) – Paralympic gold medalist rower Wu Xiaoli (吳小莉) – news presenter Wu Jinglian (吴敬琏) – economist	208
November 10	Dafushan, Panyu	5 km	Wu Jingyu (吴静钰) – Olympic gold medalist taekwondo Zolkples Embong – Head of Mission for Malaysia at the 2010 Asian Games; Cheung King Wai, Azizulhasni Awang – cyclist Kim Moon-soo – badminton Akram Abdul Gani – footballer Rebecca Chiu (趙詠賢) – squash player Hem Bunting – marathoner Nader al-Masri, Abdullah Al-Thuwaini, Kareem Ennab – swimmer Hoang Thi Tuat, Fehaid Al Deehani – shooter Chov Sotheara – wrestler Noriyuki Ichihara – handball player Khor Poh Chin, Jia Rui, Faustina Woo Wai Sii – wushu Alireza Nadi – volleyball player Yuliya Borzova – canoer Han Hye-Song – table tennis player Husam Hamada, Kamal Adhikari, Hidilyn Diaz, Sinta Darmariani – weightlifter Khalifa Al Jabri – beach volleyball player John Baylon – judo Samaresh Jung – Commonwealth Games gold medalist shooter Md Dulal Hossain – golfer Zeeshan Ashraf, Rehan Butt – field hockey player Hyun Jung-Hwa (玄静和) – table tennis champion	83
November 11	Guangzhou Higher Education Mega Center	15.2 km	Yang Yang (杨扬) – Olympic gold medalist speed skater Chen Weiya (陈维亚) – film director Guan Weizhen (关渭贞) – Olympic silver medalist badminton player Eric Tsang (曾志偉), Alan Tam (谭咏麟), Zhang Ziyi (章子怡), Kangta (安七炫), Zhang Tielin (张铁林), Qin Lan (秦岚), Hins Cheung (张敬轩), Charlene Choi (蔡卓妍) – actor/actress/singer Liu Shiwen (刘诗雯), Sun Tiantian (孙甜甜) – table tennis player Zou Zhenxian (邹振先) – triple jumper Lang Lang (郎朗) – pianist	130
November 12	Haixinsha Island (Part of opening ceremony)	–	Chen Yibing (陈一冰) – Olympic gold medalist gymnast Rong Zhihang (容志行) – ex-footballer Deng Yaping (邓亚萍) – Olympic gold medalist table tennis player He Chong (何冲) – Olympic gold medalist diver	5

== See also ==
- 2008 Summer Olympics torch relay route
- 2010 Asian Para Games torch relay
- 2009 East Asian Games torch relay
- 2022 Asian Games torch relay
