= Wu Zhiying =

Chinese footballer (born 1950)

Wu Zhiying 吴志英
Personal information
- Full name: Wu Zhiying
- Date of birth: 1950 (age 75–76)
- Place of birth: Guangzhou, Guangdong, China
- Position: Centre-back

Youth career
- Guangzhou No.5

Senior career*
Years	Team	Apps	(Gls)
1971–1979	Guangdong		
- Caroline Hill
- Sea Bee
- Eastern

International career
1973–1974	China B	2	(0)
- * Club domestic league appearances and goals

Wu Zhiying
- Simplified Chinese: 吴志英
- Traditional Chinese: 吳志英
Transcriptions
Standard Mandarin
- Hanyu Pinyin: Wú zhìyīng
- Wade–Giles: Wú^{1} zhì^{1}yīng^{2}

Wu Zhiying (Chinese: 吴志英; pinyin: Wú zhìyīng; born 1950) is a retired Chinese footballer. Nicknamed "Hen Ying" (鸡乸英) in Hong Kong, he played for Guangdong throughout the 1970s and for various clubs in Hong Kong across the 1980s. He is also the father of Hong Kong footballer Ng Wai Chiu.

== Club career ==
Wu began his career within Zhushouxiang Primary School in elementary school and Guangzhou No. 5 Middle School with both schools specializing in football. Following the reconstruction of Guangdong's football club following the Cultural Revolution in 1969, Wu was convinced by Guangdong manager Chen Hanlin to make his senior debut for the 1971 National Football Championship. The following year, Wu took part in an international tour across Africa to play in a series of friendlies against Cameroon, Equatorial Guinea and Congo-Brazzaville. He notably played alongside Liang Decheng during the 1975 National Games of China, defending fiercely against the football finals against Liaoning that led to both teams sharing the title by the time of closing ceremony. Wu was later part of the squads that won third place in the 1979 National Games of China as well as the inaugural 1st Guangdong–Hong Kong Cup, playing with He Jia in the latter. Following his move to Hong Kong in 1979, Wu played for various Hong Kong clubs throughout the 1980s such as Caroline Hill, Sea Bee and Eastern before his retirement.

== International career ==
Wu was first called to represent China B team for two separate tours to play against Albania in 1973 and 1974 respectively.

== Personal life ==
Wu's oldest brother, Wu Zhixiong worked in the bicycle factory industry before becoming a businessman in Guangdong. His second brother, Wu Zhihao, worked in the Guangzhou First Cotton Mill as he took up football within the amateur ranks of Guangdong. His youngest brother, Wu Zhijie, also became a footballer and played in Macau in the 1980s.

Wu later moved to Hong Kong as his wife who was of Indonesian Chinese descent had already lived there. His son Wu Weichao later continued in his father's footsteps, becoming a Hong Kong international as well as becoming the first Hong Kong player to play in China. Wu notably helped train his son throughout his youth career and helped him improve his accuracy and passing.
