= Chan Sai Kau =

Hong Kong footballer

Personal information
- Full name: Chan Sai Kau
- Date of birth: August 26, 1952 (age 74)
- Position: Defender

Senior career*
| Years | Team | Apps | (Gls) |
| 1967–68 | HKFC | ? | (?) |
| 1968–78 | South China | ? | (?) |
| 1978–86 | Happy Valley | ? | (?) |
| 1986–88 | Sing Tao | ? | (?) |

International career
| ? – ? | Hong Kong | ? | (?) |
- * Club domestic league appearances and goals

Chan Sai Kau (Chinese: 陳世九; Cantonese Yale: Chàn Saigáu, born 26 August 1952) is a retired Hong Kong professional football player. He played for South China for many years. He then transferred to Happy Valley with teammates Choi York Yee and Fung Chi Ming in 1978-79 season by signing a contract of HKD$5,500 per month. This was a big contract value at the time.

In 1977-78 season, he helped South China to create the record of unbeaten in Hong Kong First Division League for the season. It was the first time ever that a team achieved this record.

He represented Hong Kong to compete in the first Guangdong-Hong Kong Cup in 1978-79.

Chan was selected in the Hong Kong First Division League Best Squad for 6 times. (1978, 79, 81, 83, 83, 86)

He immigrated to Britain after finishing his career but has now moved back to Hong Kong.
