= 1979 Lunar New Year Cup =

1979 Lunar New Year Cup was a Hong Kong football tournament, played on the first few days of Chinese New Year.

== Participating teams ==
- Hong Kong League XI
- (China) Guangdong
- (Sweden) Öster

== Match results ==
1979-01-30
15:15 GMT+8

Guangdong (China)	0–0	(Sweden) Öster

Government Stadium, Hong Kong
Attendance: 14,617
1979-02-02
20:00 GMT+8

Hong Kong League XI	1–1	(Sweden) Öster
(賓尼) 60'		(伊域臣) 17'

Government Stadium, Hong Kong
Attendance: 12,492

== See also ==
- 1979 Guangdong–Hong Kong Cup
