= Abdul-Karim Farhan =

Iraqi association football player

Personal information
- Full name: Abdul-Karim Farhan Khalaf Al-Rubaie
- Date of birth: 26 November 1956 (age 69)
- Place of birth: Iraq
- Position: Defender

Senior career*
Years	Team	Apps	(Gls)
- Al-Talaba SC

International career
1976–1979	Iraq		

Managerial career
- Iraq U23 (Managing Director)
- * Club domestic league appearances and goals

Abdul-Karim Farhan (born 26 November 1956) is a former Iraqi footballer who played for Iraq in the 1978 Asian Games. He played for the national team between 1976 and 1979. and is currently assistant coach of the Olympic team.
