= Cherdsak Chaiyabutr =

Thai footballer

Cherdsak Chaiyabutr (Thai: เชิดศักดิ์ ชัยบุตร, also spelled Cherdsakdi Chaibutr) is a former football player who played for Thailand in the 1970s. He is famous for scoring a Hat-trick against India at the 1977 President Cup in a 4–0 win.
