= Fung Chi Ming =

Hong Kong footballer

Personal information
- Full name: Fung Chi Ming
- Date of birth: 13 January 1951 (age 75)
- Position: Forward

Senior career*
| Years | Team | Apps | (Gls) |
| 1972–1978 | South China | | |
| 1978–1980 | Happy Valley | | |
| 1980–1984 | South China | | |
| 1985–1986 | Sea Bee | | |
| 1987–1988 | Po Chai | | |
| 1988–1989 | Tin Tin | | |
| 1989–1990 | Sea Bee | | |
| 1990–1991 | Martini | | |

International career
- Hong Kong
- * Club domestic league appearances and goals

Fung Chi Ming (Chinese: 馮志明; Jyutping: fung^{4} zi^{3} ming^{4}, born 13 January 1951) is a Hong Kong former football player. He played the position of a striker or right winger and won the Hong Kong First Division League Best Scorer Award twice in 1976-77 and 77–78.

Nicknamed "Fung Little" (馮細), he was called the 3A's of Hong Kong national football team together with Wan Chi Keung and Sze Kin Hei.

He got famous when he played in South China. In 1978–79, together with his teammates Choi York Yee and Chan Sai Kau, they moved to Happy Valley by each signing a big contract of HKD$5,500 per month. However, Fung could not maintain his form and moved back to South China after two seasons.
