= Tang Qunying =

Chinese political activist (1871–1937)

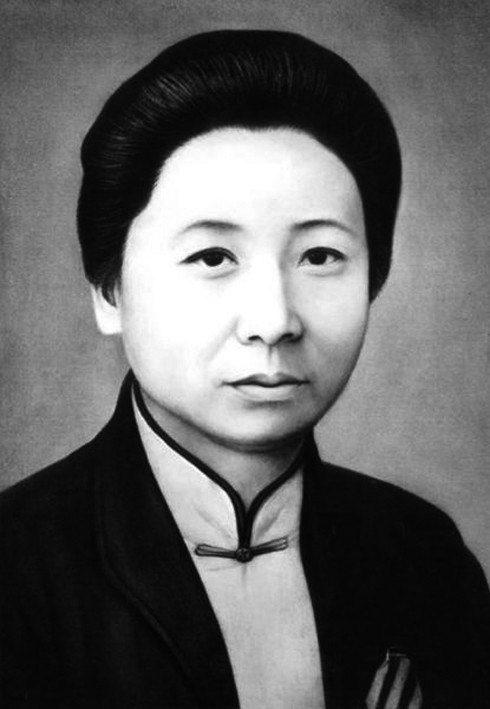
- Born: Tang Gongyi; 8 December 1871; Hengshan County, Hunan
- Died: 3 June 1937 (aged 65); Hunan
- Years active: 1903–1920s
- Spouse: Zeng Zhuangang (1891 – c.1897)
- Children: 1
- Parent: General Tang (father)

Tang Qunying (Chinese: 唐群英; 8 December 1871 – 3 June 1937) was the first female member of the Tongmenghui (Chinese Revolutionary Alliance), a secret society and underground resistance movement founded in Tokyo, Japan by Sun Yat-sen and Song Jiaoren in 1905. Tang has been cited as one of the "best-known women activists in modern Chinese history".

She was chairwoman of the Women's Suffrage Alliance, an organization created by the merger of the Nanjing Women's Alliance, the Women's Backup Society, the Women's Martial Spirit Society, and the Women's Suffrage Comrades' Alliance in 1912. In 1913, she founded Women's Rights Daily, Hunan's first newspaper for women.

For her contributions in overthrowing the ruling dynasty in China, Sun Yat-sen personally met her and acclaimed her work. She was later awarded a second-class Order of the Precious Brilliant Golden Grain.

== Early life ==
Tang was born on 8 December 1871 in Hengshan County, Hunan, as Tang Gongyi. She was the third of seven children (three sons and four daughters), and the second-to-youngest daughter of a general (Note: One source lists her father's name as "Tang Shaohuan", while another states it as "Tang Xingzhao".) during the Qing dynasty rule. At the age of three, she is said to have already started displaying rebellious behaviour to her mother.

She was reportedly very close to her father who educated her and her sisters along with his sons, treating them as equals. As a child, her father recited to her the tales of Mulan and the Yang Family Warriors, to name a few. She was seen as excellent in her studies and was also a poet. She was regarded as a talented speaker from a young age, her quick and sharp replies and arguments early in life believed to reflect her keen and sharp intellect. She wrote her first poem "Getting up at Dawn" when she was 15, which laid the foundation for her advocacy of women's rights. She learned horse riding and swordsmanship which prompted her father to call her "female knight-errant", while her mother called her "wild like a monkey". She was regarded as a child prodigy.

== Personal life ==
After her father's death in 1890, she married Zeng Zhuangang (the cousin of Zeng Guofan) in 1891, at the age of 19. He was from the neighboring village of Heye (Lotus Leaf), from an elite family well connected to another famous feminist leader of China, Qiu Jin. This association benefited her with new political thoughts and contacts. Her first and only daughter died at the age of three in 1896 due to fever and her husband followed suit in 1897. She then returned to her parental family despite not being customary to do so, due to her feminist friends like Qiu Jin encouraging her to become independent. She devoted herself to serious studies of books, and caring for her mother and brothers. She had a habit of reading about reforms in society. She catalogued her father's books and wrote poetry. Her friend, Qiu Jin, also supplied her books from Japan when she was living in Beijing, prior to her departure to Japan. One of the books which influenced her most was the Book of the Great Unity, which brought out the condition of women in China, and she wrote a poem giving her thoughts on the effect of the book under the title "My thoughts on reading Datong shu." Her mother died in 1918.

== Career ==
In 1904, at the age of 33, she went to Japan to pursue her studies at Shimoda Utako's Practical Woman's School in Tokyo, which promoted conservative reformist ethos of "good wives and wise mothers" which was said not to be to her liking. She then moved to Shanghai with her brother Qian. She formed a circle of her old friends from China with similar ideology to bring about change in Chinese society and political scene. She quickly became an active member of the Revolutionary Alliance of which she was the lone female member, affectionately addressed as "Elder Sister Tang", and played a pioneering role. In 1905, her revolutionary approach saw her learn weapons handling and bomb manufacturing, with Russian anarchists being her trainers. Tang took up this training with zest and zeal, in which many of her feminist friends also took part. Then the suffrage movement was launched from 1910 to 1913 and many of her friends also joined the movement. Within the exile community, Tang, with her proficiency in political journalism, played a key role in giving a positive boost to the movement.

Thereafter, she displayed a militant approach in pursuing her conviction to establish gender equality between men and women, and participation of women in political affairs. Her feminist movements in China were a part of the social revolution in China, during the Revolution of 1911. As a leader of the Women's Suffrage Alliance, she led a series of demonstrations in which she and several other women stormed into sessions of parliament, demanding that the provisional constitution then under debate including voting rights for women. Sun Yat-sen agreed to mediate, and the parliament promised to take the subject up. After Sun Yat-sen resigned the presidency, however they lost much of their leverage. In August 1912 the electoral laws were passed which specifically excluded women as voters or candidates.

While playing a leading role as a female member of the resistance movement in Japan, she established the Journal of Association of Chinese Female Students to promote revolutionary activities in China. She was also responsible for establishing the Ten-day Vernacular Newspaper for Women and restarted publication of Chinese Women Report. In Hunan, in 1913, she started the Women's Rights Daily, which was the first of its kind. Advocacy of women's studies by Tang Qunying and Shen Peizhen resulted in Qunying establishing schools for Hunan's female community, apart from many girls' schools. A result of feminist movement was the creation of women's military organizations, when women even assassinated a few officials of the Qing dynasty (1644–1911). Other positive developments of the revolution was, children of both sexes attended in co-education classes, which helped them to establish their rights from a young age. Tang established two educational institutions – the Girls' Art School and the Girls' Occupational School.

== Later life and death ==
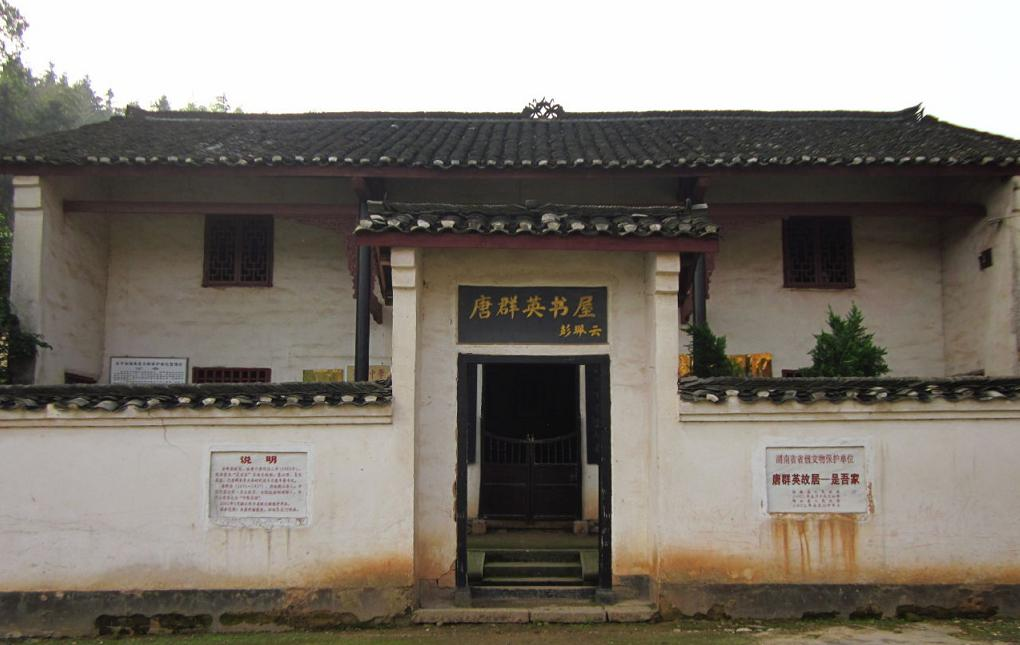
Former residence of Tang, Hunan, China.

Tang was regarded as very confident of her convictions, and like her leader Sun Yat-sen she would supposedly take to the political stage to face even a hostile crowd and bring them all around to her line of thinking. She was said to exude confidence, inspiring a generation of women who could freely express their viewpoints in all types of gatherings without feeling nervous.

In propagating her ideas, as a suffragist, Tang could, as a political strategist, adopt a "rigid or flexible" approach, could be "empathetic or furious", and "analytical or impulsive" as the situation warranted. Tang was so dedicated to the revolutionary leader Sun Yat-sen that when he died on 12 March 1925, she wrote a poem titled "I weep for President Sun Yat-sen" and compared the grief of the nation on his death as a "miasma". She held a memorial in his honour in the girls school she had founded.

Following the appointment of Yuan Shikai as President of the Republic of China, Tang's newspapers were forced to cease publication, organisations founded by Tang were dissolved, and Yuan, an opponent of Tang's views, ordered her capture. Tang fled to Chengsha and spent some time there with her mother. She returned to Hengshan around a year before her death. Tang died in her hometown of Hunan, China, on 3 June 1937, aged 66.

== Awards ==
Apart from the Jiahe (Golden Harvest) Medal, she was also honoured with the title of "heroine of her times" in 1991 by the former vice-chairman of the 5th CPPCC National Committee and honorary president of the All-China Women's Federation. In 1999, she was given a pride of place as one of the "eight outstanding Chinese women over a century" during the 4th World Conference on Women.

== Bibliography ==
- David Strand (2011). An unfinished republic: leading by word and deed in modern China. University of California Press. pp. 98–101, 102-, 312–. ISBN 978-0-520-26736-7.
- Ma, Yuxin (2010). Women journalists and feminism in China, 1898-1937. Cambria Press. ISBN 978-1-60497-660-1.
- Sue Wiles (2003). 中國婦女傳記詞典. M.E. Sharpe. pp. 504–. ISBN 9780765607980.
