= Habib Khabiri =

Iranian footballer

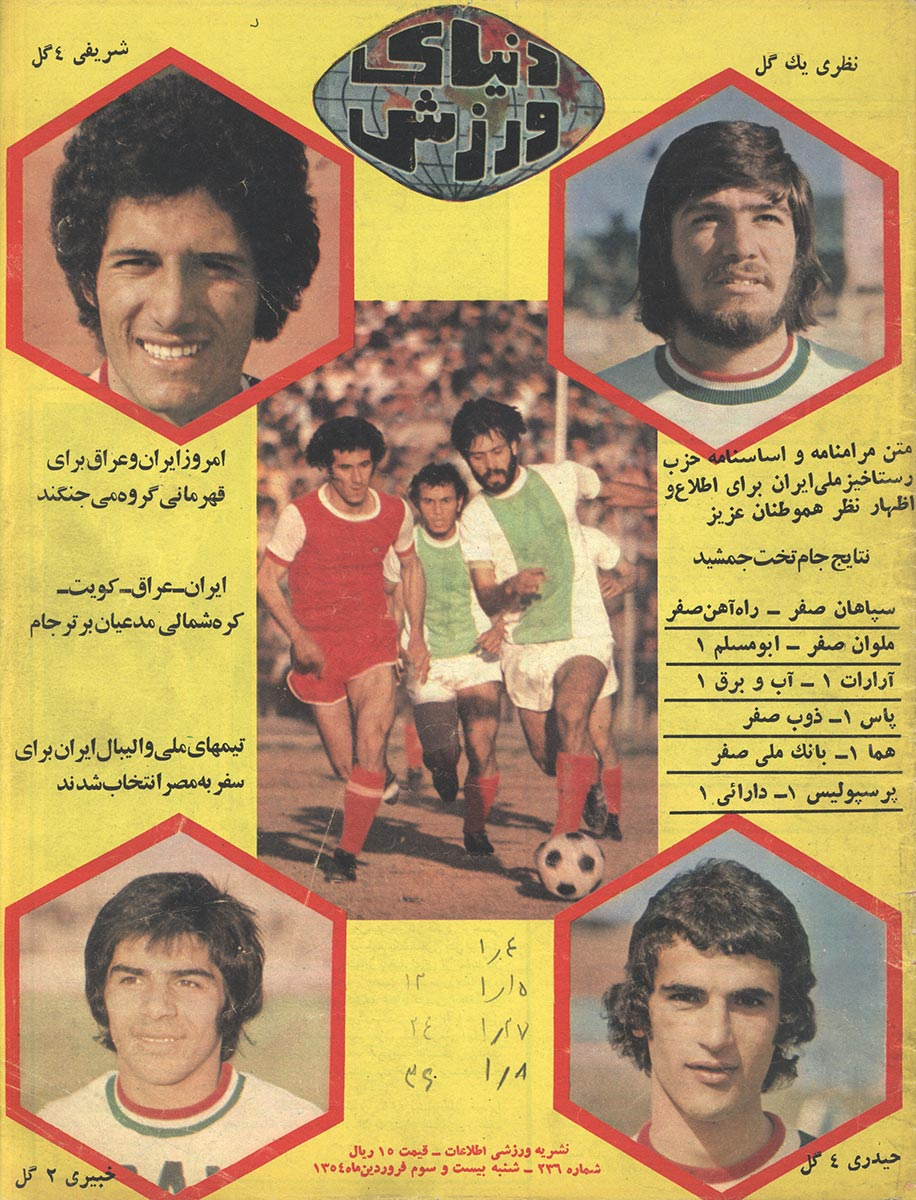
- Donyaye Varzesh Magazine cover, Khabiri in bottom left corner of the photo.

Personal information
- Date of birth: 15 August 1954
- Date of death: 21 June 1984 (aged 29)
- Place of death: Tehran, Iran
- Position: Defender

Senior career*
Years	Team	Apps	(Gls)
1974–1976	Homa		

International career
1977–1980	Iran	18	(2)
- * Club domestic league appearances and goals

Habib Khabiri (15 August 1954 – 21 June 1984) was an Iranian footballer and captain of the Iran national football team. He was arrested for membership of the People's Mojahedin Organisation of Iran in 1983. He was subsequently tortured and executed by shooting the following year. His brother, Mohammad, was also an Iranian international and vice-president of the Football Federation Islamic Republic of Iran.
