= Adnan Jafar =

Iraqi footballer (born 1949)

Personal information
- Full name: Adnan Jafar Alwan
- Date of birth: 29 December 1949 (age 76)
- Place of birth: Iraq

Senior career*
Years	Team	Apps	(Gls)
- Al Bareed
- Kuliya Al-Shorta
- Al-Shorta
- Diyala FC
- Al-Shorta

International career
1977-1980	Iraq		
- * Club domestic league appearances and goals

Adnan Jafar (born 29 December 1949) is a former Iraqi footballer who played for Iraq in the 1978 Asian Games. He played for the national team in 1978.
