= Kevin Weymouth =

New Zealand footballer

Personal information
- Full name: Kevin D Weymouth
- Place of birth: New Zealand

Senior career*
Years	Team	Apps	(Gls)
1975	North Shore United		
1977–79	Mt Wellington		

International career
1975–1977	New Zealand	12	(1)
- * Club domestic league appearances and goals

Kevin Weymouth is a footballer who represented New Zealand at international level.

Weymouth made his full All Whites debut in a 2–1 win over China on 20 July 1975 and ended his international playing career with 12 A-international caps and 1 goal to his credit, his final cap an appearance in a 1–1 draw with Australia on 30 March 1977.
