= Dhurgham Mahdi =

Iraqi association football player

Personal information
- Full name: Dhurgham Mahdi Radi
- Date of birth: 1 July 1951 (age 75)
- Place of birth: Iraq
- Position: Midfielder

Senior career*
Years	Team	Apps	(Gls)
- AL Kadhimiya SC
- Al-Sinaa SC
- Al-Jaish SC

International career
1974–1980	Iraq		
- * Club domestic league appearances and goals

Dhurgham Mahdi (born 1 July 1951) is a former Iraqi football midfielder who played for Iraq at the 1978 Asian Games.

Mahdi played for Iraq between 1974 and 1980.
