= Wang Changguo =

Chinese suffragist and feminist

Wang Changguo (Chinese: 王昌國; 1880–1949) was a Chinese suffragist and feminist. She was a co-founder and leading member of the suffrage organisation Nüzi chanzheng tongmenghui (1912–1913).
