= Lin Zongsu =

Chinese suffragist and writer

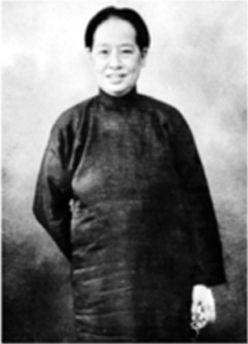
- Born: 林宗素; 1878; Minhou, Fujian, China
- Died: 1944 (aged 65–66); Kunming, Yunnan, China
- Occupations: journalist, editor, women's rights activist
- Years active: 1898–1913
- Known for: founding the first women's suffrage organization in China

Lin Zongsu (Chinese: 林宗素; 1878–1944) was a Chinese suffragist and writer. She founded the first women's suffrage organization in China and was one of China's most noted political feminist activists in the Qing-early Republican period. She also became one of China's first woman journalists and newspaper editors. As a journalist, she published widely on women's rights and led several women's organizations until democracy was suppressed in 1913. In later life, she taught in Singapore and ran a boating enterprise there which was able to finance her brother's newspapers in China. After a decade in Southeast Asia, she and her husband returned to China and lived in the southern part of the country where their business operations were located.

== Biography ==
Lin Zongsu was born in 1878 in Minhou, Fujian Province, China, to Lin Jianquan (Chinese: 林剑泉), a writer, and Huang Fu (Chinese: 黄夫), a scholar and composer of lyrics. A spirited child, her parents chose not bind her feet and her mother tutored her at home. When her mother died, Lin was still quite young and lived with an uncle, attending a Western school. Around 1898, she moved to Hangzhou, where she joined her older brother, Lin Baiyong, who was a journalist there. She became acquainted with the nascent anti-Qing revolutionary groups and met Qiu Jin, who would later become a martyr of the revolution. In 1902, she began studying at the Patriotic Girls School (Chinese: 爱国女校学) of Shanghai. The school was a radical departure from traditional Chinese schools, mixing study of chemistry and physics with the history of the French Revolution and the Russian Nihilist movement, as well as advocating for women's political engagement. She soon followed other Chinese students to Japan in 1903.

Like other Chinese students during this period, Lin, who was accompanied by her brother, wanted to be able to learn outside of the government-dominated system of China and gain a modern sensibility. She marched in protest against the Russo-Japanese War and joined the Japanese Red Cross to learn medical skill and be able to help with wounded soldiers. She also founded the first women student's association with other female Chinese students, called the Mutual Love Society (Chinese: 共爱会), which advocated for women's rights and their right to education. The organization published their views in the journal Jiangsu, and Lin began writing essays about equality. In 1903, she published in Jiangsu a preface to A Tocsin for Women (Chinese: 女界鐘) written by Jin Songcen, which urged women to liberate themselves and their nation.

After a year in Japan, she returned to Shanghai and went to work at her brother's newspaper Chinese Vernacular News (Chinese: 中国白话报), becoming one of the first female journalists in China. She also became an associate editor for the Daily Alarm (Chinese: 警钟日报). Both of these papers provided analysis and commentary on democracy and Lin wrote many articles advocating revolution, before both were forced to shut down by the government in 1905. She decided to return to Japan to study at the Tokyo Higher Normal School (Japanese: 東京師範学校). That autumn, when Huang Xing set up a munitions factory in Yokohama, she and other Chinese students began participating in anarchist activities and became known as "Sophia heroines", in reference to the activities of Sophia Perovskaya. In December 1905, she joined the Tongmenghui of Sun Yat-sen to continue her activism and participated in many of their anti-government activities. Then in 1906, an edict limiting Chinese students' political activity was passed by the Japanese Ministry of Education. She completed her education at the normal school, and married a friend of her brother's, Tong Fu (Chinese: 同赴) of Shanghai.

== Career ==
The Qing dynasty fell in October 1911 with the success of the Wuchang Uprising and Lin returned to China. She joined the Chinese Socialist Party, when it was organized by Jiang Kanghu. On 12 November 1911, Lin formed the first organization in China seeking women's enfranchisement, the Women's Suffrage Comrades Alliance (Chinese: 女子参政同志会) in Shanghai. The organization was formed as a branch of the socialist party so that the women were able to seek political change. She also established a journal, called the Women's Times (Chinese: 女子倍) to publish information about suffrage and the organization.

Lin met with Sun Yat-sen in Nanjing in 1912 and received his promise that women would gain the vote when the National Assembly was established. She published the statement in the Shenzhou Daily and the Women's Times, gaining both approval and disapproval. Sun Yat-Sen, though he had given permission for Lin to print, distanced himself from the controversy saying suffrage was a matter for a majority to decide. Lin published another article in the Heavenly Bell News (Tianduo Bao) refuting his dismissal and his version of their discussion. Having put the idea of women's votes into the public arena, several other women's organizations formed to press for rights while the debates on the Provisional Constitution of the Republic of China were ongoing and submitted a formal proposal for equality. When the Constitution was issued on March 11, it contained no provision for women's voting. The women continued to press the provisional senate and sent five petitions requesting their rights be legalized, but the National Assembly saw their actions as threatening and refused to hear them.

== Later life ==
In 1913, Lin and Tong divorced and Lin left the political arena and moved to Nanjing. Democracy was suppressed under the Yuan Shikai regime and when Lin was invited to go to Southeast Asia, she agreed. At the invitation of the Singapore Chamber of Commerce, Lin relocated and became a teacher. She married a merchant from Hangzhou and they ran a successful boating business becoming quite well-to-do. Lin used her proceeds to help her brother finance his newspaper. In March 1922, the couple returned to Beijing, but due to her husband's business interests, soon relocated to Kaifeng, in Henan province. In 1925, the couple's only child died and grief-sticken, Lin joined her brother in Beijing. After he was killed the following year, she returned to the south. When the Second Sino-Japanese War broke out, the family moved to Kunming, in Yunnan Province, where she died in 1944.
