= Choi York Yee =

Hong Kong footballer and sports commentator

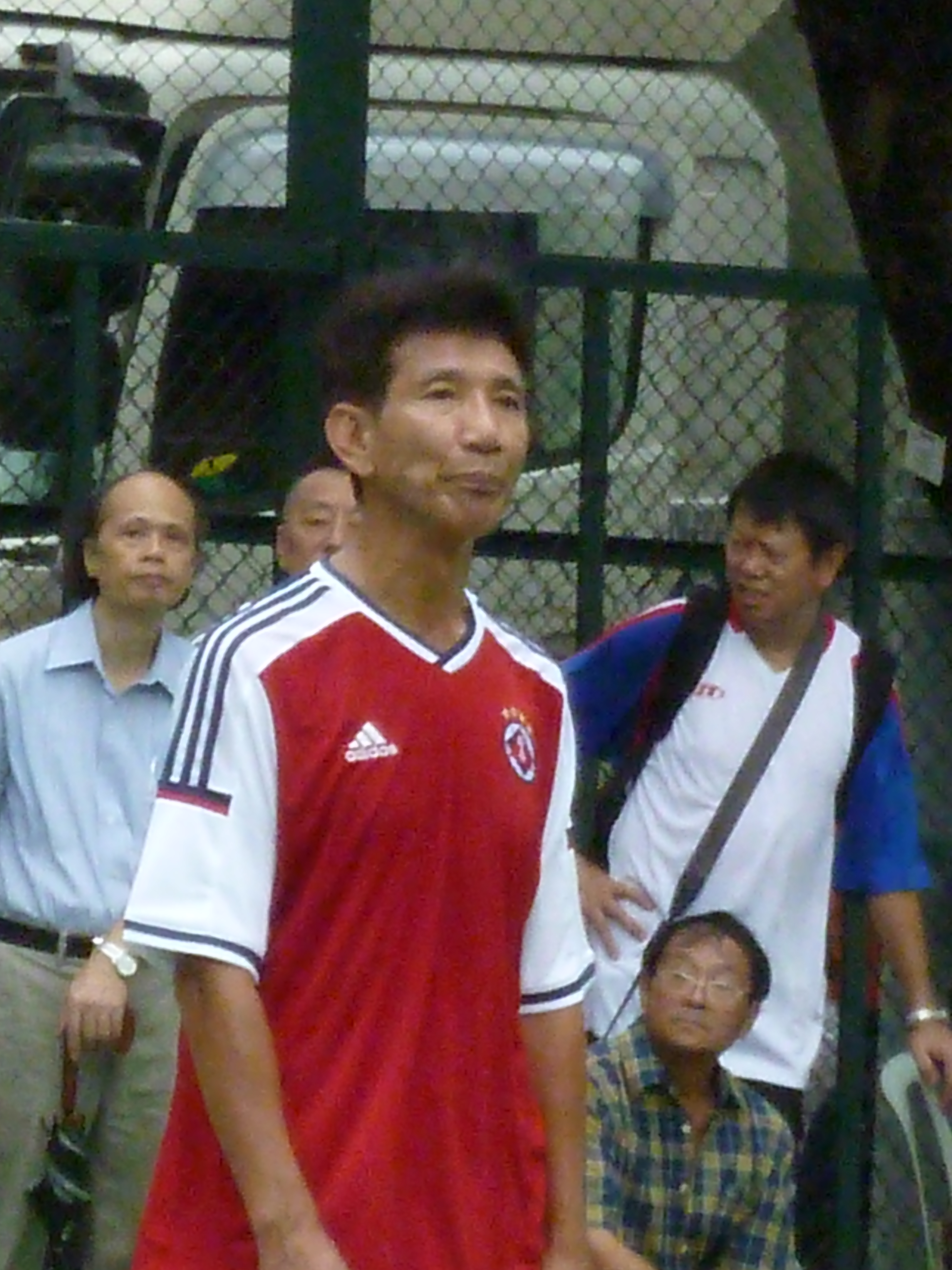
Choi York Yee

Choi York Yee (Chinese: 蔡育瑜; Cantonese Yale: Choi Yuhk Yù, born 11 May 1953) is a retired Hong Kong football player and is now a sports commentator in Hong Kong.

He played as a defender in South China for 8 years. He played for the club for the first time in 1973. The defense line formed by him, Lok Tak Fai, Leung Siu Wa and Chan Sai Kau, together with goalkeeper Chow Chee Keong, helped South China to become the best team in defense at the time.

He transferred to Happy Valley in 1978. Then he returned to South China two years later. In 1978, he moved to Seiko and played the last year for his professional football.

On 23 February 2007, he was invited to represent SCAA 92/93 Invitation Team to play against SCAA Elite Youth in the pre-match of the exhibition competition BMA Cup organized by South China.
