= Niwat Srisawat =

Thai footballer (1947–2025)

Personal information
- Date of birth: 19 August 1947
- Place of birth: Phitsanulok, Thailand
- Date of death: 19 April 2025 (aged 77)
- Place of death: Nakhon Pathom, Thailand
- Height: 1.74 m (5 ft 9 in)
- Position: Striker

Youth career
- 1964: Physical college
- 1965: Panapan School

Senior career*
| Years | Team | Apps | (Gls) |
- Raj-Vithi FC
- PAT FC

International career
| 1966–1967 | Thailand (Youth) | | |
| 1967–1979 | Thailand | 85 | (55) |

Managerial career
- 2002–2007: Thai Port
- * Club domestic league appearances and goals

Niwat Srisawat (Thai: นิวัฒน์ ศรีสวัสดิ์; 19 August 1947 – 19 April 2025), known by the nickname Tong, was a Thai footballer who represented the Thailand national team from 1967 to 1979. He was the striker who was the all-time top goalscorer of the national team with his 55 goals.

== Career ==
Niwat retired from the Thailand national team on 2 December 1976 after he had played the match against South Korea which Thailand won 1–0 in the King's Cup.

== Personal life and death ==
Niwat was the half-brother of Daoyod Dara who was also a footballer for the Thailand national team. He was the stepson of the former South Vietnam national football team player Nguyễn Văn Đức who married his mother in the 1950s and gave birth to Daoyod. Nguyễn later changed his name to Duan Dara after his naturalization to become a Thai citizen.

Niwat died in Nakhon Pathom on 19 April 2025, at the age of 77.
