= Lau Wing Yip =

Hong Kong footballer (born 1953)

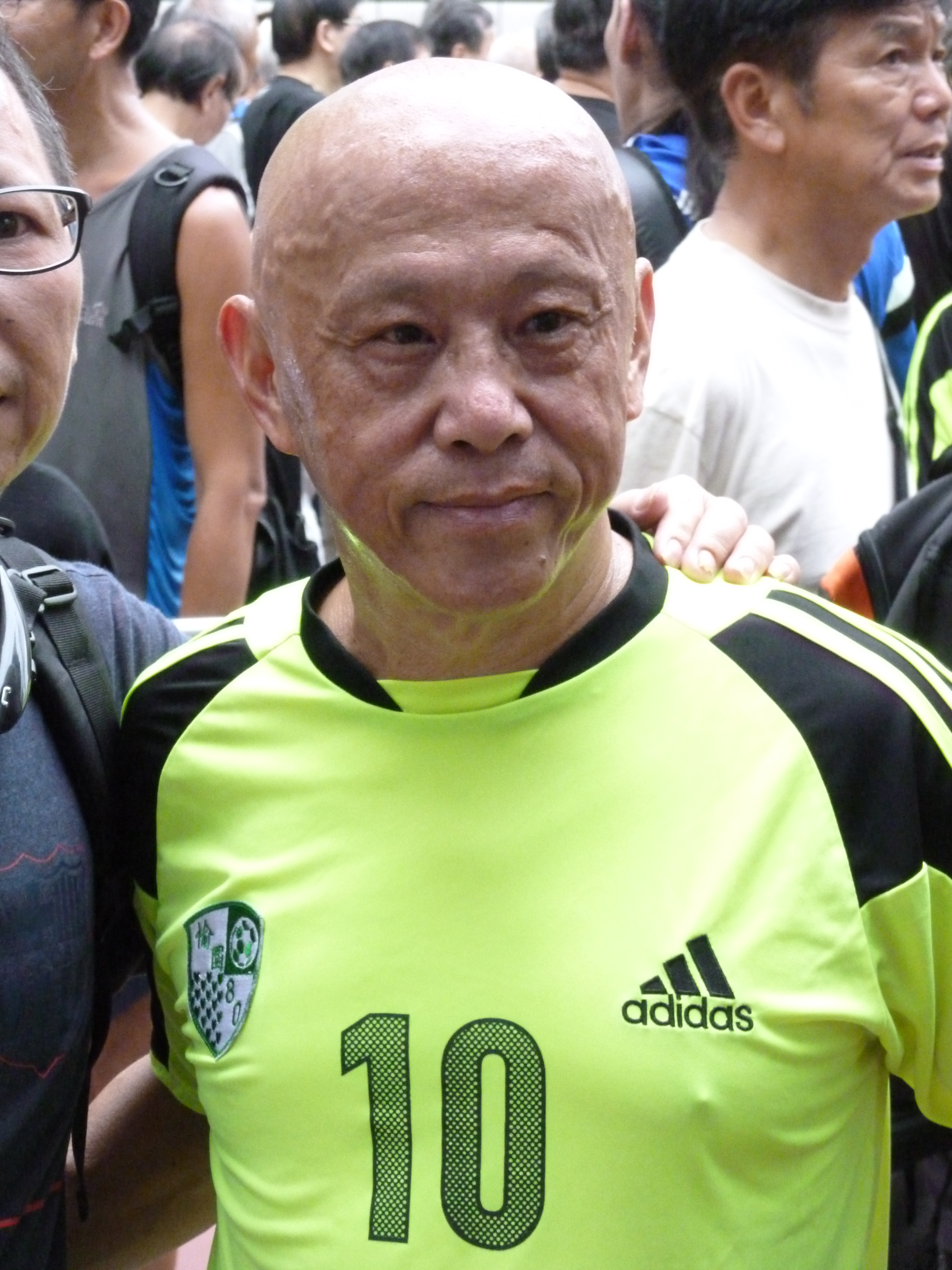
- Lau in 2015

Personal information
- Date of birth: 18 August 1953 (age 73)
- Place of birth: Hong Kong
- Height: 1.70 m (5 ft 7 in)
- Positions: Midfielder; winger

Youth career
- Happy Valley

Senior career*
Years	Team	Apps	(Gls)
1973–1987	Happy Valley		

International career
1973–1985	Hong Kong	39	(24)
- * Club domestic league appearances and goals

Lau Wing Yip (Chinese: 劉榮業; born 18 August 1953) is a Hong Kong former professional footballer who played as a midfielder or a winger.

== Club career ==
Lau spent his entire career with Hong Kong First Division League club Happy Valley.
