= He Jia =

Chinese footballer (born 1951)

He Jia 何佳
Personal information
- Full name: He Jia
- Date of birth: 16 August 1951 (age 75)
- Place of birth: Guangzhou, China
- Position: Midfielder

Senior career*
Years	Team	Apps	(Gls)
–1982	Guangdong team		
1983–1986	South China		

International career
1975–1978	China	17	(5)
Medal record
Men's football
Representing China
AFC Asian Cup
Bronze medal – third place	1976 Iran	Team
Asian Games
Bronze medal – third place	1978 Bangkok	Football
- * Club domestic league appearances and goals

He Jia (Chinese: 何佳; pinyin: Hé Jiā; born 16 August 1951) is a former Chinese footballer.

== Club career ==
He was born in 1951 in Guangzhou, Guangdong. He began his career at Guangdong team. In 1979, He captained Guangdong in the inaugural Guangdong–Hong Kong Cup, scoring in the second leg. In 1982, Jia left Guangdong, moving to Hong Kong in the process. Following the influx of mainland Chinese players into the Hong Kong First Division, He joined South China in 1983.

== International career ==
On 15 June 1975, He made his debut for China in a 1–0 win against North Korea. He played three times for China at the 1976 AFC Asian Cup, scoring once. On 6 October 1977, He scored the opening goal against the United States in China's first game of their first tour to the Western Bloc.

=== International goals ===
Scores and results list China's goal tally first.

#	Date	Venue	Opponent	Score	Result	Competition
1	14 August 1975	Workers' Stadium, Beijing, China	Kuwait		3–3	Friendly
2	13 June 1976	Aryamehr Stadium, Tehran, Iran	Iraq	1–0	1–0	1976 AFC Asian Cup third place play-off
3	6 October 1977	Robert F. Kennedy Memorial Stadium, Washington, D.C., United States	United States	1–0	1–1	Friendly
4	31 March 1978	Estadio Olímpico, Caracas, Venezuela	Venezuela	1–0	1–0	Friendly
5	18 December 1978	Supachalasai Stadium, Bangkok, Thailand	Thailand	4–1	4–1	1978 Asian Games
