= Khmer Republic national football team results (1970–1974) =

This article provides details of international football matches played by the Cambodia national football team—under the name "Khmer Republic"—between 1970 and 1974. From 1975 to 1979, there are no matches were played during the Khmer Rouge.

== Results ==
=== 1970 ===
9 November 1970 King's Cup	Khmer Republic	1–1	Malaysia	Bangkok, Thailand
	Doeour Sokhom 88'	Report	Shaharuddin Abdullah 24'

13 November 1970 King's Cup	Khmer Republic	2–2	South Vietnam	Bangkok, Thailand
	Doeur Sokhom (?); ? (?)	Report

15 November 1970 King's Cup	Khmer Republic	2–4	Indonesia	Bangkok, Thailand
	Doeur Sokhom 58'; Sieng Tara 88'	Report	Soetjipto Soentoro 10'; Waskito 34', 55'; Iswadi Idris 49'

10 December 1970 Asian Games	Burma	2–1	Khmer Republic	Bangkok, Thailand
	Win Maung 26'; Myo Win Nyunt 50'		Doeuk Miladord 90' (pen.)

12 December 1970 Asian Games	Japan	1–0	Khmer Republic	Bangkok, Thailand
	Yuguchi 58'

14 December 1970 Asian Games	Malaysia	0–2	Khmer Republic	Bangkok, Thailand
			Slayman Salim 12'; Pen Phath 68'

December Friendly	South Vietnam	0–3	Khmer Republic	Saigon, South Vietnam
		Report		Stadium: Cộng Hòa Stadium

=== 1971 ===
7 January 1971 Spring Tree Cup Preliminary-Round	South Vietnam Civilians	0–1	Khmer Republic	Saigon, South Vietnam
		Report		Stadium: Cong Hoa Stadium

8 January 1971 Spring Tree Cup Semi-Final	South Vietnam Military	3–1	Khmer Republic	Saigon, South Vietnam
		Report		Stadium: Cong Hoa Stadium

10 January 1971 Spring Tree Cup Third-Place	Khmer Republic	4–0	Hong Kong Rangers	Saigon, South Vietnam
		Report		Stadium: Thong Nhat Stadium

30 January Friendly	Thailand	0-1	Khmer Republic	Bangkok, Thailand
		Report	Seasim Hiang 71'	Attendance: 7,000

2 February Hybrid Friendly	Chiang Mai Province (Thailand)	1-6	Khmer Republic	Chiang Mai, Thailand
		Report

3 May 1971 President's Cup	Malaysia	3–1	Khmer Republic	Seoul, South Korea
18:00 UTC+9	Ahmad 25', 80'; Salleh 33' (pen.)	Report	Doeur 65'	Stadium: Dongdaemun Stadium

5 May 1971 President's Cup	Thailand	4–3	Khmer Republic	Seoul, South Korea
19:50 UTC+9				Stadium: Dongdaemun Stadium

3 May 1971 President's Cup	South Korea	2–0	Khmer Republic	Seoul, South Korea
16:50 UTC+9	Lee Hoe-taik 38', 67'	Report		Stadium: Dongdaemun Stadium

21 May 1972 AFC Asian Cup qualification	Thailand	1–1	Khmer Republic	Bangkok, Thailand

24 May 1972 AFC Asian Cup qualification	Khmer Republic	2–1	Hong Kong	Bangkok, Thailand

26 May 1972 AFC Asian Cup qualification	Malaysia	2–1	Khmer Republic	Bangkok, Thailand
	Wong Choon Wah 12'; Shaharuddin Abdullah 75'	Report	Slayman Salim 44'

30 May 1972 AFC Asian Cup qualification Semi-Final	Khmer Republic	2–0	Indonesia	Bangkok, Thailand
	Eang (?); ? (?)	Report

1 June 1972 AFC Asian Cup qualification Final	Thailand	4–2	Khmer Republic	Bangkok, Thailand

6 June 1971 Jakarta Anniversary Tournament	Khmer Republic	2–2	Western Australia	Jakarta, Indonesia
				Stadium: Senayan Stadium

8 June 1971 Jakarta Anniversary Tournament	Khmer Republic	1–1	Malaysia	Jakarta, Indonesia
	Sokhom 83'		Hashim 69'	Stadium: Senayan Stadium

12 June 1971 Jakarta Anniversary Tournament	Khmer Republic	3–0	Thailand	Jakarta, Indonesia
	Doeur Sokhom 23'; Miladord 30'; Tes Sean 80'			Stadium: Senayan Stadium
Note: after the final whistle, Thai players started a brawl which led to a six month suspension of the team by the FAT

13 June 1971 Jakarta Anniversary Tournament	Indonesia	1–0	Khmer Republic	Jakarta, Indonesia
	Abdul Kadir 74'			Stadium: Senayan Stadium

14 June 1971 Jakarta Anniversary Tournament Semi-Final	Burma	8–0	Khmer Republic	Jakarta, Indonesia
				Stadium: Senayan Stadium

15 June 1971 Jakarta Anniversary Tournament Third-Place	Malaysia	2–1	Khmer Republic	Jakarta, Indonesia
				Stadium: Senayan Stadium

12 December 1971 SEAP Games	Khmer Republic	1–1	Thailand	Kuala Lumpur, Malaysia
	Hean 67'	Report	Somnuk 17'	Stadium: Stadium Merdeka

13 December 1971 SEAP Games	Laos	0–2	Khmer Republic	Kuala Lumpur, Malaysia
		Report	Eang 39'; Salim 83' (pen.)	Stadium: Stadium Merdeka

15 December 1971 SEAP Games	Malaysia	3–0	Khmer Republic	Kuala Lumpur, Malaysia
	Salleh Ibrahim 5' unknown Wong Choon Wah 56'			Stadium: Stadium Merdeka

=== 1972 ===
27 March Hybrid Friendly	(Thailand) Thai Air Force	2-2	Khmer Republic	Bangkok, Thailand
		Report		Stadium: National Stadium

29 March Hybrid Friendly	(Thailand) Bangkok Bank	0-3	Khmer Republic	Bangkok, Thailand
		Report		Stadium: National Stadium

31 March Hybrid Friendly	Thailand Youth	1-2	Khmer Republic	Bangkok, Thailand
		Report		Stadium: National Stadium

7 May 1972 AFC Asian Cup Play-Off	Iran	2–0	Khmer Republic	Bangkok, Thailand
	Kalani 45'; Iranpak 51'			Stadium: National Stadium; Attendance: 3,000; Referee: Kim Jo-Wong (South Korea)

10 May 1972 AFC Asian Cup Group Stage	South Korea	4–1	Khmer Republic	Bangkok, Thailand
	Park Su-deok 37'; Lee Hoi-taek 59'; Cha Bum-kun 69'; Park Lee-chun 78'		Doeur Sokhom 82'	Stadium: National Stadium; Attendance: 7,000

14 May 1972 AFC Asian Cup Group Stage	Khmer Republic	4–0	Kuwait	Bangkok, Thailand
	Doeur Sokhom 23'; Sok Sun Hean 56'; Tes Sean 59'; Sea Cheng Eang 80'			Stadium: National Stadium; Attendance: 1,000

16 May 1972 AFC Asian Cup Semi-Final	Iran	2–1	Khmer Republic	Bangkok, Thailand
	Iranpak 13'; Ghelichkhani 47'		Doeur Sokhom 18'	Stadium: National Stadium; Attendance: 2,000; Referee: Matolozi (Malaysia)

19 May 1972 AFC Asian Cup Third-Place	Khmer Republic	2–2 (3-5 p)	Thailand	Bangkok, Thailand
	Tol Kimchi 44', 49'		Ich Narding 6', 90+13'	Stadium: National Stadium; Attendance: 15,000

6 June 1972 Jakarta Anniversary Tournament	Khmer Republic	3–0	Singapore	Jakarta, Indonesia
	Doeur Sokhom 34', 55'; Tes Sean 69'

8 June 1972 Jakarta Anniversary Tournament	Thailand	0–2	Khmer Republic	Jakarta, Indonesia

10 June 1972 Jakarta Anniversary Tournament	South Korea B	2–0	Khmer Republic	Jakarta, Indonesia
	Moon Jae-sup; Jung Gyu-poong

14 June 1972 Jakarta Anniversary Tournament	Khmer Republic	4–0	Philippines	Jakarta, Indonesia
	Tes Sean 29'; Doeur Sokhom 34' 60'; Doeur Miladord 39'

17 June 1972 Jakarta Anniversary Tournament Semi-Final	Indonesia	4–0	Khmer Republic	Jakarta, Indonesia
	Rony Pat; Risdianto; Iswadi; Kadir

19 June 1972 Jakarta Anniversary Tournament Third-Place	Khmer Republic	3–0	Burma	Jakarta, Indonesia

25 June Friendly	Singapore	1–0	Khmer Republic	Kallang, Singapore
				Stadium: Jalan Besar Stadium

12 July 1972 Merdeka Tournament	Japan	4–1	Khmer Republic	Kuala Lumpur, Malaysia
	Kamamoto 50', 65', 72', 75'		Doeuk Miladord 82'	Stadium: Merdeka Stadium

14 July 1972 Merdeka Tournament	Khmer Republic	2–1	Burma B	Kuala Lumpur, Malaysia
	Sok Sun Hean 11', 12'		Pan Sit 37'	Stadium: Merdeka Stadium; Referee: Bishen Singh (Singapore)

16 July 1972 Merdeka Tournament	Khmer Republic	2–2	Philippines	Kuala Lumpur, Malaysia
	Doeuk Miladord 40'; Dan Phalla 55'		I. Lozano 32'; Miguel Grame 56'	Stadium: Merdeka Stadium

19 July 1972 Merdeka Tournament	Malaysia	6–1	Khmer Republic	Ipoh, Malaysia
				Stadium: Perak Stadium

22 July 1972 Merdeka Tournament	Khmer Republic	6–1	Sri Lanka	Kuala Lumpur, Malaysia
	Doeur Soekhom 35'; Sea Cheng Eang 39', 66'; Sok Sun Seah 42'; Doeuk Miladord 63' (pen.), 87'		Hassimdeen 69'	Stadium: Merdeka Stadium

28 July 1972 Merdeka Tournament Fifth-Place	Khmer Republic	1–0	Hong Kong	Kuala Lumpur, Malaysia
	Sleyman Selim 49'			Stadium: Merdeka Stadium

1 August Pesta Sukan Cup 1972	Japan	Unknown	Khmer Republic	Kallang, Singapore
		Report		Stadium: Jalan Besar Stadium

3 August Pesta Sukan Cup 1972	Indonesia	5–0	Khmer Republic	Kallang, Singapore
	Risdianto 6'; Abdul Kadir 11', 54'; Sihasale 49'; Waskito 86'	Report		Stadium: Jalan Besar Stadium; Attendance: 3,000

5 August Pesta Sukan Cup 1972	Khmer Republic	Unknown	Philippines	Kallang, Singapore
		Report		Stadium: Jalan Besar Stadium

3 August Pesta Sukan Soccer Tournament	Khmer Republic	2–2	Burma	Kallang, Singapore
	Phalla 25'; Eang 28'	Report	Tint 42'; Tun 73'	Stadium: Jalan Besar Stadium

10 August Pesta Sukan Soccer Tournament	Hong Kong	2–1	Khmer Republic	Kallang, Singapore
	Chin 49'; Choo 57'	Report	Sokhom 50'	Stadium: Jalan Besar Stadium

20 September 1972 President's Cup	Malaysia	1–0	Khmer Republic	Seoul, South Korea
	Chin Aun 44'	Report		Stadium: Dongdaemun Stadium

22 September 1972 President's Cup	South Korea	3–1	Khmer Republic	Seoul, South Korea
18:40 UTC+9	Park Lee-chun 26' (pen.); Kim Jin-kook 32', 61'	Report	Khath 85'	Stadium: Dongdaemun Stadium

24 September 1972 President's Cup	Thailand	0–0	Khmer Republic	Seoul, South Korea
				Stadium: Dongdaemun Stadium

27 September 1972 President's Cup Seventh-Place	Khmer Republic	1–0	Philippines	Seoul, South Korea
	Sea 84'	Report		Stadium: Dongdaemun Stadium

28 October 1972 South Vietnam Independence Cup Preliminary round	Singapore	1–0	Khmer Republic	Saigon, South Vietnam
		Report		Stadium: Cộng Hòa Stadium

29 October 1972 South Vietnam Independence Cup Semi-Final	Khmer Republic	1–0	Malaysia	Saigon, South Vietnam
		Report		Stadium: Cộng Hòa Stadium

1 November 1972 South Vietnam Independence Cup Final	South Vietnam	1–2 (a.e.t.)	Khmer Republic	Saigon, South Vietnam
		Report		Stadium: Cộng Hòa Stadium

=== 1973 ===
26 July 1973 Merdeka Tournament Play-Off	Singapore	1–1 (2–1 p)	Khmer Republic	Kuala Lumpur, Malaysia
	Seak Poh Leong 19'	Report	Sok Sun Hean 59'	Stadium: Stadium Merdeka

28 July 1973 Merdeka Tournament	Malaysia	1–0	Khmer Republic	Kuala Lumpur, Malaysia
	Soh Chin Ann 20'	Report		Stadium: Stadium Merdeka

30 July 1973 Merdeka Tournament	South Korea	1–0	Khmer Republic	Kuala Lumpur, Malaysia
	Seung Kee (?)	Report		Stadium: Stadium Merdeka

31 July 1973 Merdeka Tournament	India	3–0	Khmer Republic	Kuala Lumpur, Malaysia
	Bernard Pereira 7'; Magan (?); Ulaganathan 60'	Report		Stadium: Stadium Merdeka

7 August 1973 Merdeka Tournament	Thailand	4–1	Khmer Republic	Kuala Lumpur, Malaysia
				Stadium: Stadium Merdeka

10 August 1973 Merdeka Tournament Ninth-Place	Singapore	3–0	Khmer Republic	Kuala Lumpur, Malaysia
	Lim Tien Jit 15'; Jaffar Yacob 70'; Lee Teik Gnee 80'	Report		Stadium: Stadium Merdeka

22 September 1973 President's Cup	South Korea	6–0	Khmer Republic	Seoul, South Korea
	Kim Jin-kook 5', 24'; Cha Bum-kun 14', 32'; Kim Jae-han 53'; Park Lee-chun 72' (pen.)	Report		Stadium: Dongdaemun Stadium; Attendance: 25,000

26 September 1973 President's Cup	Indonesia	2–3	Khmer Republic	Seoul, South Korea
	Asmara 4'; Kadir 88'	Report	Sea 47', 57'; Chin 59'	Stadium: Dongdaemun Stadium

28 September 1973 President's Cup Semi-Final	Malaysia	0–2	Khmer Republic	Seoul, South Korea
		Report	Sok 63'; Doeur 89'	Stadium: Dongdaemun Stadium

30 September 1973 President's Cup Final	Burma	0–0 (a.e.t.)	Khmer Republic	Seoul, South Korea
				Stadium: Dongdaemun Stadium

16 December 1973 King's Cup	South Korea	5–0	Khmer Republic	Bangkok, Thailand
		Report

20 December 1973 King's Cup	Malaysia	3–2	Khmer Republic	Bangkok, Thailand
		Report

23 December 1973 King's Cup	Khmer Republic	5–2	Laos	Bangkok, Thailand
		Report

=== 1974 ===
9 January Hybrid Friendly	Khmer Republic	0–4	(Austria) Rapid Wien	Jakarta, Indonesia
		Report		Attendance: 25,000

10 January Friendly	Indonesia	3–1	Khmer Republic	Jakarta, Indonesia
		Report		Stadium: Jalan Besar Stadium

19 March 1974 Marah Halim Cup	PSM Makassar (Indonesia)	3–2	Khmer Republic	Medan, Indonesia
		Report

23 March 1974 Marah Halim Cup	Persiraja Banda Aceh (Indonesia)	3–0	Khmer Republic	Medan, Indonesia
		Report

26 March 1974 Marah Halim Cup	Japan XI	4–2	Khmer Republic	Medan, Indonesia
		Report

2 April 1974 Marah Halim Cup Ninth-Place	Persib Bandung (Indonesia)	1–1	Khmer Republic	Medan, Indonesia
		Report

18 April Friendly	Khmer Republic	1–1	South Vietnam	Phnom Penh, Khmer Republic
		Report		Stadium: Olympic Stadium

11 May 1974 President's Cup	Malaysia B	1–1	Khmer Republic	Seoul, South Korea
				Stadium: Dongdaemun Stadium

13 May 1974 President's Cup	South Korea	0–1	Khmer Republic	Seoul, South Korea
		Report	Doeur 9'	Stadium: Dongdaemun Stadium

15 May 1974 President's Cup	Japan B	1–1	Khmer Republic	Seoul, South Korea
	Usui 62'	Report	Doeur 61'	Stadium: Dongdaemun Stadium

18 May 1974 President's Cup Semi-Final	PSMS Medan (Indonesia)	1–1 (a.e.t.) (3–2 p)	Khmer Republic	Seoul, South Korea
				Stadium: Dongdaemun Stadium

20 May 1974 President's Cup Third-Place	Burma	6–0	Khmer Republic	Seoul, South Korea
				Stadium: Dongdaemun Stadium

2 November 1974 South Vietnam Independence Cup	Persipura (Indonesia)	3–1	Khmer Republic	Saigon, South Vietnam
		Report		Stadium: Cộng Hòa Stadium

3 November 1974 South Vietnam Independence Cup	Thailand	2–2	Khmer Republic	Saigon, South Vietnam
		Report		Stadium: Cộng Hòa Stadium

11 December 1974 King's Cup	Khmer Republic	3–2	South Vietnam	Bangkok, Thailand
		Report

13 December 1974 King's Cup	South Korea	2–1	Khmer Republic	Bangkok, Thailand
		Report

15 December 1974 King's Cup	Khmer Republic	1–1	(Indonesia) PSM Makassar	Bangkok, Thailand
		Report

16 December 1974 King's Cup	Khmer Republic	2–0	South Vietnam	Bangkok, Thailand
		Report
Note: Playoff game was needed to determine 2nd place

18 December 1974 King's Cup Semi-Final	Khmer Republic	0–1	Thailand	Bangkok, Thailand
		Report

20 December 1974 King's Cup Third-Place	Khmer Republic	0–3	Malaysia	Bangkok, Thailand
		Report

=== 1975–1979 ===
From 1975 to 1979, all football activities in Cambodia were suspended due to Cambodian genocide during Khmer Rouge.

== Head-to-head records ==
Khmer Republic national football team head-to-head records (1970–1974)
Opponent	Pld	W	D	L	GF	GA	GD	Pts	Confederation
Burma	6	1	2	3	6	18	–12	5	AFC
Hong Kong	3	2	0	1	4	3	+1	6	AFC
India	1	0	0	1	0	3	–3	0	AFC
Indonesia	7	2	0	5	8	19	–11	6	AFC
Iran	2	0	0	2	1	4	–3	0	AFC
Japan	2	0	0	2	1	5	–4	0	AFC
Kuwait	1	1	0	0	4	0	+4	3	AFC
Laos	2	2	0	0	7	2	+5	6	AFC
Malaysia	14	3	2	9	13	26	–13	11	AFC
Philippines	3	2	1	0	7	2	+5	7	AFC
Singapore	5	1	1	3	4	6	–2	4	AFC
South Korea	8	1	0	7	4	23	–19	3	AFC
South Vietnam	6	4	2	0	13	6	+7	14	AFC
Sri Lanka	1	1	0	0	6	1	+5	3	AFC
Thailand	12	3	5	4	18	19	–1	14	AFC
Total	73	23	13	37	96	137	–41	82	
