= List of Indonesia national football team hat-tricks =

Since the Garuda' first match in 1934, 28 players have scored a hat-trick (three or more goals in a single match). The first player to do so was Ludwich Jahn in a win over Japan in 1934. Iswadi Idris's five goals in the 9–1 victory over South Vietnam is the team record for most goals in a match.

This is a list of hat-tricks scored in matches involving the Indonesia national football team.

== Hat-tricks for Indonesia ==
Date	Goals	Player	Opponent	Venue	Competition	Result ^{[a]}	Ref
13 May 1934	3	Ludwich Jahn	Japan	Rizal Memorial Stadium, Manila	1934 Far Eastern Games	7–1	
13 May 1934	3	Tio Hian Goan	Japan	Rizal Memorial Stadium, Manila	1934 Far Eastern Games	7–1	
31 August 1957	4	Omo Suratmo	Thailand	Merdeka Stadium, Kuala Lumpur	1957 Merdeka Tournament	4–0	
30 May 1958	3	Wowo Sunaryo	Philippines	Tokyo Football Stadium, Tokyo	1958 Asian Games	5–2	
2 July 1958	3	Omo Suratmo	Singapore	Jalan Besar Stadium, Kallang	Friendly	5–0	
8 August 1960	4	Henky Timisela	Singapore	Merdeka Stadium, Kuala Lumpur	1960 Merdeka Tournament	8–3	
14 August 1960	3	Omo Suratmo	Pakistan	Merdeka Stadium, Kuala Lumpur	1960 Merdeka Tournament	4–0	
12 September 1962	4	Solong Hajah	Philippines	Merdeka Stadium, Kuala Lumpur	1962 Merdeka Tournament	4–2	
23 February 1964	4	Komar	(Dominion of Ceylon) Ceylon	Sugathadasa Stadium, Colombo	Friendly	9–3	
1 August 1967	3	Soetjipto Soentoro	Philippines	Taipei Municipal Stadium, Taipei	1968 AFC Asian Cup qualification	6–0	
19 August 1968	3	Soetjipto Soentoro	Taiwan	Merdeka Stadium, Kuala Lumpur	1968 Merdeka Tournament	10–1	
19 August 1968	3	Iswadi Idris	Taiwan	Merdeka Stadium, Kuala Lumpur	1968 Merdeka Tournament	10–1	
26 November 1968	3	Soetjipto Soentoro	Singapore	Suphachalasai Stadium, Bangkok	1968 King's Cup	7–0	
28 November 1968	3	Soetjipto Soentoro	Malaysia	Suphachalasai Stadium, Bangkok	1968 King's Cup	6–1	
1 November 1969	3	Iswadi Idris	Thailand	Merdeka Stadium, Kuala Lumpur	1969 Merdeka Tournament	4–0	
7 November 1969	3	Abdul Kadir	Singapore	Merdeka Stadium, Kuala Lumpur	1969 Merdeka Tournament	9–2	
7 November 1969	3	Soetjipto Soentoro	Singapore	Merdeka Stadium, Kuala Lumpur	1969 Merdeka Tournament	9–2	
9 November 1970	3	Kainun Waskito	South Vietnam	Suphachalasai Stadium, Bangkok	1970 King's Cup	5–3	
2 May 1971	5	Iswadi Idris	South Vietnam	Dongdaemun Stadium, Seoul	1971 President's Cup	9–1	
28 May 1971	3	Djunaedi Abdillah	Brunei	Suphachalasai Stadium, Bangkok	1972 AFC Asian Cup qualification	9–0	
28 May 1971	3	Andi Lala	Brunei	Suphachalasai Stadium, Bangkok	1972 AFC Asian Cup qualification	9–0	
7 August 1971	3	Kainun Waskito	India	Merdeka Stadium, Kuala Lumpur	1971 Merdeka Tournament	3–1	
13 August 1971	3	Kainun Waskito	Singapore	Merdeka Stadium, Kuala Lumpur	1971 Merdeka Tournament	4–0	
11 June 1972	3	Jacob Sihasale	Sri Lanka	Gelora Senayan Main Stadium, Jakarta	1972 Jakarta Anniversary Tournament	8–0	
20 June 1972	3	Risdianto	South Korea	Gelora Senayan Main Stadium, Jakarta	1972 Jakarta Anniversary Tournament	5–2	
25 September 1972	3	Iswadi Idris	Philippines	Dongdaemun Stadium, Seoul	1972 President's Cup	12–0	
7 June 1974	3	Abdul Kadir	Malaysia	Gelora Senayan Main Stadium, Jakarta	1974 Jakarta Anniversary Tournament	4–3	
17 February 1976	3	Djunaedi Abdillah	Papua New Guinea	Gelora Senayan Main Stadium, Jakarta	1976 Summer Olympics qualification	8–2	
13 June 1978	3	Abdul Kadir	Malaysia	Gelora Senayan Main Stadium, Jakarta	1978 Jakarta Anniversary Tournament	3–0	
2 September 1981	3	Stefanus Sirey	United Arab Emirates	Merdeka Stadium, Kuala Lumpur	1981 Merdeka Tournament	5–2	
21 August 1989	3	Mustaqim	Brunei	Cheras Stadium. Kuala Lumpur	1989 Southeast Asian Games	6–0	
6 December 1995	4	Eri Irianto	Cambodia	700th Anniversary Stadium, Chiang Mai	1995 Southeast Asian Games	5–0	
6 December 1995	3	Kurniawan Dwi Yulianto	Cambodia	700th Anniversary Stadium, Chiang Mai	1995 Southeast Asian Games	5–0	
6 April 1997	3	Rochy Putiray	Cambodia	Gelora Senayan Main Stadium, Jakarta	1998 FIFA World Cup qualification	6–0	
20 November 1999	3	Rochy Putiray	Cambodia	Gelora Senayan Main Stadium, Jakarta	2000 AFC Asian Cup qualification	9–2	
22 April 2001	3	Uston Nawawi	Cambodia	Gelora Bung Karno Stadium, Jakarta	2002 FIFA World Cup qualification	6–0	
17 December 2002	3	Bambang Pamungkas	Cambodia	Gelora Bung Karno Stadium, Jakarta	2002 AFF Championship	4–2	
23 December 2002	4	Bambang Pamungkas	Philippines	Gelora Bung Karno Stadium, Jakarta	2002 AFF Championship	13–1	
23 December 2002	4	Zaenal Arief	Philippines	Gelora Bung Karno Stadium, Jakarta	2002 AFF Championship	13–1	
17 November 2004	3	Ilham Jaya Kesuma	Turkmenistan	Gelora Bung Karno Stadium, Jakarta	2006 FIFA World Cup qualification	3–1	
13 December 2004	3	Ilham Jaya Kesuma	Cambodia	Mỹ Đình National Stadium, Hanoi	2004 AFF Championship	8–0	
21 August 2008	4	Budi Sudarsono	Cambodia	Gelora Bung Karno Stadium, Jakarta	2008 Indonesia Independence Cup	7–0	
7 December 2008	3	Budi Sudarsono	Cambodia	Gelora Bung Karno Stadium, Jakarta	2008 AFF Championship	4–0	
26 September 2012	3	Irfan Bachdim	Brunei	Sultan Hassanal Bolkiah Stadium, Bandar Seri Begawan	Friendly	5–0	
15 June 2019	4	Beto Gonçalves	Vanuatu	Gelora Bung Karno Stadium, Jakarta	Friendly	6–0	
12 October 2023	3	Dimas Drajad	Brunei	Gelora Bung Karno Stadium, Jakarta	2026 FIFA World Cup qualification	6–0	
27 July 2026	3	Mitchell Baker	Cambodia	Pakansari Stadium, Bogor	2026 ASEAN Championship	5–1	
1 October 2026	5	Mitchell Baker	Bangladesh	Gelora Bung Karno Stadium, Jakarta	2026 FIFA ASEAN Cup	9–2	

== Hat-tricks conceded by Indonesia ==
Date	Goals	Player	Opponent	Venue	Competition	Result ^{[a]}	Ref(s)
26 June 1938	4	Piet Dumortier	Netherlands	Olympic Stadium, Amsterdam	Friendly	2–9	
9 September 1956	3	Miloš Milutinović	(Socialist Federal Republic of Yugoslavia) Yugoslavia	JNA Stadium, Belgrade	Friendly	2–4	
15 August 1970	3	Ali Bakar	Malaysia	Merdeka Stadium, Kuala Lumpur	1970 Merdeka Tournament	0–4	
30 September 1972	3	Win Maung	(Myanmar) Burma	Dongdaemun Stadium, Seoul	1972 President's Cup	1–3	
3 September 1974	3	Niels-Christian Holmstrom	Denmark	Idrætspark, Copenhagen	Friendly	0–9	
3 September 1974	3	Henning Jensen	Denmark	Idrætspark, Copenhagen	Friendly	0–9	
21 March 1980	3	Khalid Ali	Malaysia	Merdeka Stadium, Kuala Lumpur	1980 Summer Olympics qualification	1–6	
21 March 1980	3	Hassan Sani	Malaysia	Merdeka Stadium, Kuala Lumpur	1980 Summer Olympics qualification	1–6	
24 March 1980	3	Roslan Suhaili	Brunei	Merdeka Stadium, Kuala Lumpur	1980 Summer Olympics qualification	2–3	
15 December 1985	3	Pichai Kongsri	Thailand	Suphachalasai Stadium, Bangkok	1985 Southeast Asian Games	0–7	
19 October 2000	3	Lee Dong-gook	South Korea	Sports City Stadium, Beirut	2000 AFC Asian Cup	0–3	
18 November 2000	3	Worrawoot Srimaka	Thailand	Rajamangala Stadium, Bangkok	2000 AFF Championship	1–4	
10 October 2003	3	Talal Al-Meshal	Saudi Arabia	Prince Abdullah Al Faisal Stadium, Jeddah	2004 AFC Asian Cup qualification	0–5	
18 November 2007	3	Zyad Chaabo	Syria	Abbasiyyin Stadium, Damascus	2010 FIFA World Cup qualification	0–7	
18 November 2007	3	Raja Rafe	Syria	Abbasiyyin Stadium, Damascus	2010 FIFA World Cup qualification	0–7	
8 October 2010	3	Luis Suárez	Uruguay	Gelora Bung Karno Stadium, Jakarta	Friendly	1–7	
8 October 2010	3	Edinson Cavani	Uruguay	Gelora Bung Karno Stadium, Jakarta	Friendly	1–7	
29 February 2012	3	Ismail Abdullatif	Bahrain	Bahrain National Stadium, Riffa	2014 FIFA World Cup qualification	0–10	
29 February 2012	3	Sayed Dhiya Saeed	Bahrain	Bahrain National Stadium, Riffa	2014 FIFA World Cup qualification	0–10	
19 November 2016	3	Teerasil Dangda	Thailand	Philippine Sports Stadium, Bocaue	2016 AFF Championship	2–4	
14 January 2018	3	Albert Guðmundsson	Iceland	Gelora Bung Karno Stadium, Jakarta	Friendly	1–4	
10 October 2019	3	Ali Mabkhout	United Arab Emirates	Al Maktoum Stadium, Dubai	2022 FIFA World Cup qualification	0–5	

== See also ==
- Indonesia national football team records and statistics
- Indonesia national football team results

== Notes ==
^{a} The result is presented with Indonesia's score first.
