= Indonesia national football team records and statistics =

This is a list of Indonesia national football team's competitive record in playing association football.

== Achievements ==
=== Continental ===
- Asian Games
  - (bronze) Bronze medal: 1958
- Far Eastern Championship Games
  - (silver) Silver medal: 1934

=== Regional ===
- FIFA ASEAN Cup
  - (gold) Champions: 2026
- ASEAN Championship
  - (silver) Runners-up: 2000, 2002, 2004, 2010, 2016, 2020
  - (bronze) Third place: 1998
- Southeast Asian Games
  - (gold) Gold medal: 1987, 1991
  - (silver) Silver medal: 1979, 1997
  - (bronze) Bronze medal: 1981, 1989, 1999

=== Friendly tournaments ===
- Pestabola Merdeka
  - Champions: 1961, 1962, 1969
  - Runners-up: 1957, 2006
  - Third place: 1958
- Aga Khan Gold Cup
  - Champions: 1961
- South Vietnam Independence Cup
  - Runners-up: 1962
- King's Cup
  - Champions: 1968
  - Runners-up: 1969, 1984
- Jakarta Anniversary Tournament
  - Champions: 1972
  - Runners-up: 1973, 1974, 1978
- Merlion Cup
  - Third place: 1982
- Indonesian Independence Cup
  - Champions: 1987, 2000, 2008
  - Runners-up: 1986, 1994
- Myanmar Grand Royal Challenge Cup
  - Runners-up: 2008
- Al Nakba Cup
  - Third place: 2012
- Aceh World Solidarity Cup
  - Runners-up: 2017

== Individual records ==
As of 5 October 2026
Players in bold are still active with Indonesia

=== Most capped players ===
Abdul Kadir is Indonesia's most-capped player ever and also its all-time top scorer

Rank	Player	Caps	Goals	Career
1	Abdul Kadir	111	70	1967–1979
2	Iswadi Idris	97	55	1968–1980
3	Bambang Pamungkas	86	38	1999–2012
4	Kainun Waskito	80	31	1967–1977
5	Jacob Sihasale	70	23	1966–1974
6	Firman Utina	66	5	2001–2014
7	**Rizky Ridho**	61	5	2021–present
7	Ponaryo Astaman	61	2	2003–2013
7	Soetjipto Soentoro	61	37	1965–1970
10	Hendro Kartiko	60	0	1996–2011
11	Kurniawan Dwi Yulianto	59	33	1995–2005
11	Risdianto	59	27	1971–1981
13	Agung Setyabudi	58	1	1993–2004
13	Bima Sakti	58	12	1995–2001
15	Fachruddin Aryanto	57	4	2012–2023
16	Henky Timisela	55	23	1958–1962
16	Widodo Cahyono Putro	55	14	1991–1999
18	**Pratama Arhan**	54	3	2021–present
18	Ismed Sofyan	54	3	2000–2010
20	Eddy Harto	53	0	1988–1993
20	Robby Darwis	53	6	1987–1997
20	Judo Hadianto	53	0	1962–1972

=== Top goalscorers ===
Iswadi Idris is Indonesia's second most-capped player and all-time top scorer

Rank	Player	Goals	Caps	Ratio	Career
1	Abdul Kadir (list)	70	111	0.63	1965–1979
2	Iswadi Idris (list)	55	97	0.57	1968–1980
3	Bambang Pamungkas	38	86	0.44	1999–2012
4	Soetjipto Soentoro	37	61	0.61	1965–1970
5	Kurniawan Dwi Yulianto	33	59	0.56	1995–2005
6	Kainun Waskito	31	80	0.39	1967–1977
7	Risdianto	25	56	0.45	1971–1981
8	Jacob Sihasale	23	70	0.33	1966–1974
8	Henky Timisela	23	55	0.42	1958–1962
10	Omo Suratmo	21	31	0.61	1957–1962
11	Rochy Putiray	17	44	0.39	1990–2004
12	Budi Sudarsono	15	49	0.31	2001–2010
13	Widodo Cahyono Putro	14	55	0.25	1991–1999
14	Boaz Solossa	13	50	0.26	2004–2018
14	Cristian Gonzáles	13	32	0.41	2010–2015
14	Ilham Jaya Kesuma	13	18	0.72	2004–2007
14	Uston Nawawi	13	47	0.28	1997–2004
14	Irfan Bachdim	13	42	0.31	2010–2019
14	Fakhri Husaini	13	42	0.31	1988–1997

=== Age-related records ===
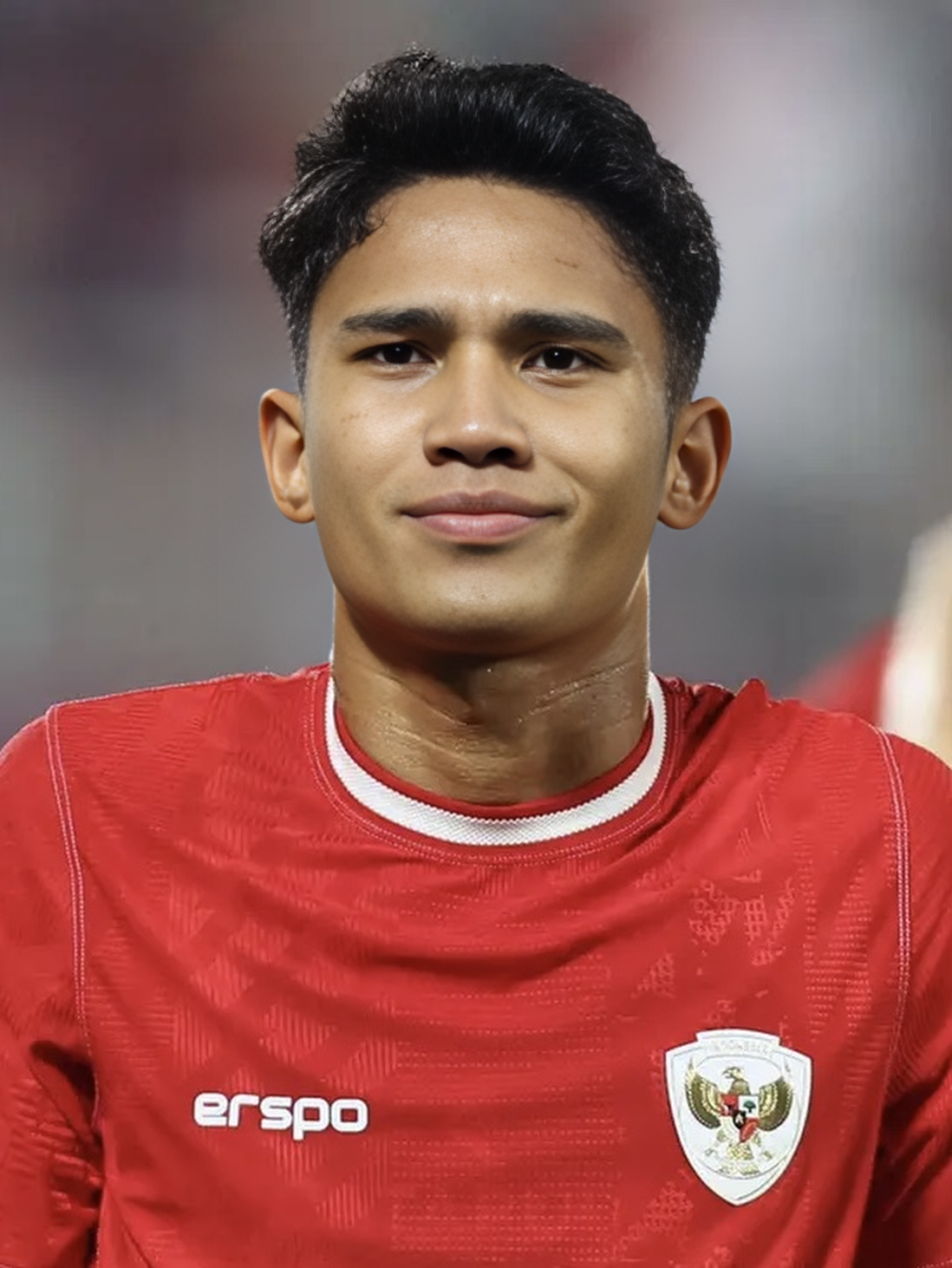
Marselino Ferdinan becomes Indonesia's youngest goal scorer at the age of 17 years and 9 months

Oldest goalscorer
40 years 7 months 21 days – Endang Witarsa (vs. China, 2 June 1957)

Youngest goalscorer
17 years 9 months 5 days – Marselino Ferdinan (vs. Nepal, 14 June 2022)

Youngest player to score a hat-trick
19 years 7 months 16 days – Mitchell Baker (vs. Cambodia, 27 July 2026)

Oldest player (outfield and goalkeeper)
40 years 7 months 21 days – Endang Witarsa (vs. China, 2 June 1957)

Longest national career
14 years 5 months – Boaz Solossa (from 30 March 2004 to 11 September 2018)

Youngest debutante
17 years 23 days – Mathew Baker (vs. Oman, 5 June 2026)

Youngest player to reach 100 caps
25 years 7 months – Abdul Kadir (vs. India, 1 August 1974)

=== Other records ===
Mitchell Baker holds two records for Indonesia: youngest player to score a hat-trick (19 years, 7 months, 16 days) and joint-most goals scored in a single match (5), sharing the latter record with Iswadi Idris

First goal scored
Ludwich Jahn (vs. Japan, 19 May 1934)

Most matches in major competitions
46 – Bambang Pamungkas

Most goals scored in a single match
5 goals
Iswadi Idris (vs. South Vietnam, 2 May 1971)
Mitchell Baker (vs. Bangladesh, 1 October 2026)

First hat-trick
Tio Hian Goan and Jahn (vs. Japan, 19 May 1934)

Most hat-tricks
5 – Soetjipto Soentoro

Fastest goals
1st minute
Waskito - (vs. India, 8 August 1971)
Jacob Sihasale - (vs. Sri Lanka, 11 June 1972)
Agusman Riyadi - (vs. Singapore, 13 May 1989)
Widodo Cahyono Putro - (vs. Cambodia, 6 April 1997)
Bambang Pamungkas - (vs. Philippines, 23 December 2002)
Ricardo Salampessy - (vs. Qatar, 14 July 2014)

Fastest goals conceded
1st minute
Zhang Honggen - (vs. China, 2 June 1957)
Maung Than Soe - (vs. Burma, 1 August 1975)
Adel Al-Salimi - (vs. Yemen, 15 October 2003)

=== Team captains ===
Notable captains

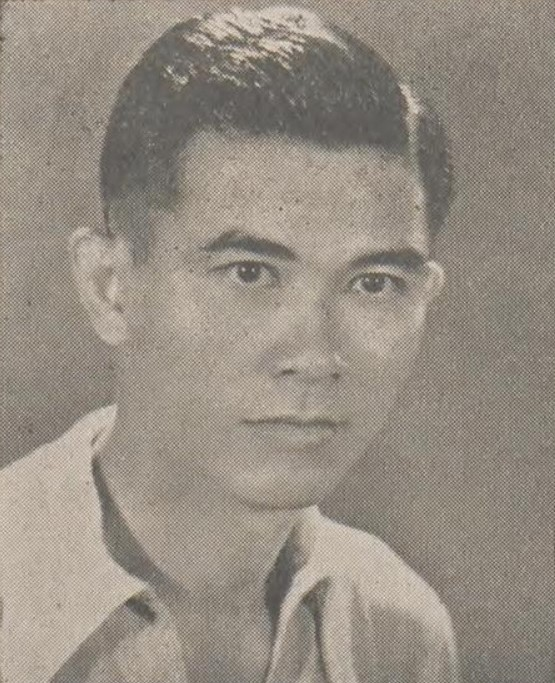
Achmad Nawir is Indonesia's first captain. He is also the first and only Indonesia captain in the World Cup when he represented the team in 1938

Name	Notes
Achmad Nawir	Indonesia's first captain; also first and only captain in the World Cup
Soetjipto Soentoro	Indonesia's joint-longest serving captain
Ronny Pattinasarany	Indonesia's joint-longest serving captain
Herry Kiswanto	1987 Southeast Asian Games winning captain
Ferril Raymond Hattu	1991 Southeast Asian Games winning captain
Kevin Diks	2026 FIFA ASEAN Cup winning captain

List of captains

Jay Idzes is the current captain of Indonesia, serving since 2024

Name	Period
Achmad Nawir	1938
Mohammad Sidhi	1950–1952
Aang Witarsa	1954–1956
Maulwi Saelan	1956
Soetjipto Soentoro	1965–1970
Iswadi Idris	1970–1971
Anwar Udjang	1971–1974
Iswadi Idris	1974–1980
Ronny Pattinasarany	1980–1985
Herry Kiswanto	1985–1987
Ricky Yacobi	1987–1990
Ferril Raymond Hattu	1991–1992
Robby Darwis	1993–1995
Sudirman	1996
Robby Darwis	1997
Aji Santoso	1998–2000
Bima Sakti	2001

Name	Period
Agung Setyabudi	2002–2004
Ponaryo Astaman	2004–2008
Charis Yulianto	2008–2010
Bambang Pamungkas	2010–2012
Elie Aiboy	2012–2013
Firman Utina	2013–2014
Boaz Solossa	2014–2018
Hansamu Yama	2018
Andritany Ardhiyasa	2018–2019
Yanto Basna	2019
Evan Dimas	2020–2022
Fachruddin Aryanto	2022–2023
Asnawi Mangkualam	2023–2024
Muhammad Ferarri	2024 (Note: Served as captain of Indonesia during the 2024 ASEAN Championship after being appointed by head coach Shin Tae-yong.)
Jay Idzes	2024–
Rizky Ridho	2026 (Note: Served as captain of Indonesia during the 2026 ASEAN Championship. Regular captain Jay Idzes was not included in the squad for the tournament.)
Kevin Diks	2026 (Note: Served as captain of Indonesia during the 2026 FIFA ASEAN Cup. Regular captain Jay Idzes was absent from the tournament due to injury. Diks was selected as captain and confirmed his appointment ahead of the tournament.)

=== Manager records ===
Notable coaches

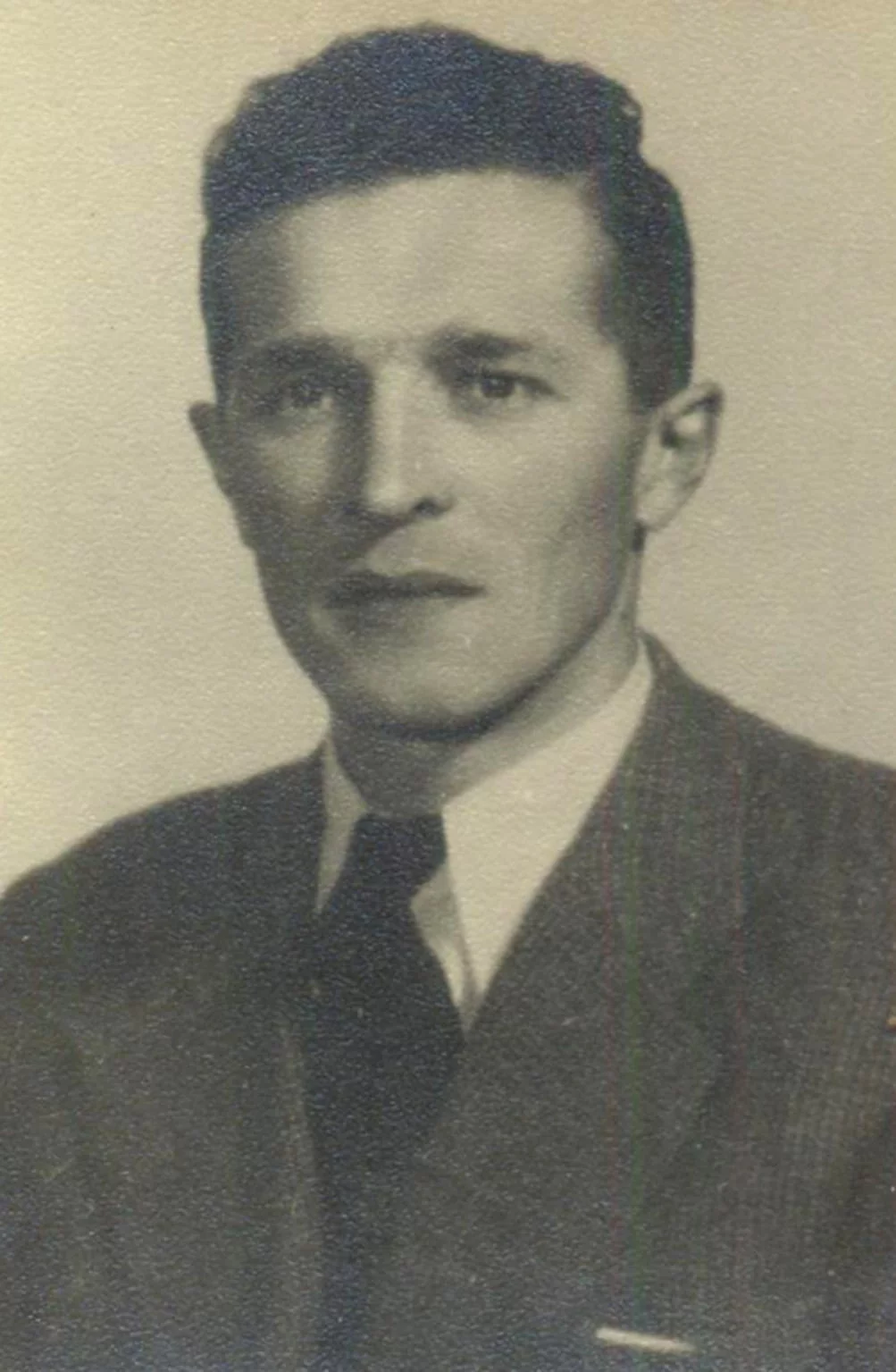
Antun "Toni" Pogačnik is Indonesia's longest-serving coach, from 1954 to 1963. He was also coached the team at the 1956 Summer Olympics in Melbourne

Name	Notes
Jan Mastenbroek	Indonesia's first coach; also first and only coach in the World Cup
Antun Pogačnik	Indonesia's longest serving coach; serving from 1954 to 1963
Bertje Matulapelwa	1987 Southeast Asian Games winning coach
Anatoli Polosin	1991 Southeast Asian Games winning coach
Shin Tae-yong	Indonesia for the first time advanced to the round of 16 of the 2023 AFC Asian Cup & Indonesia for the first time advanced to the third round of World Cup qualification
John Herdman	2026 FIFA ASEAN Cup winning coach

Most appearances
69 – Antun Pogačnik
Most wins
36 – Antun Pogačnik
Youngest to take job
31 years 6 months – Jan Mastenbroek
Oldest to take job
66 years 7 months – Alfred Riedl

== Team records ==
Biggest win
12–0 vs. Philippines, 22 September 1972
13–1 vs. Philippines, 23 December 2002
Biggest defeat
0–10 vs. Bahrain, 29 February 2012
Most goals in a match
13 goals - Philippines, 23 December 2002
Most goals by both teams in a match
14 goals - Philippines, 23 December 2002
Most goals in first half
7 goals - Philippines, 23 December 2002
Most goals in second half
8 goals - Singapore, 7 November 1969
Most goals conceded in a match
10 goals - Bahrain, 29 February 2012
Most goals conceded in first half
6 goals - Denmark , 3 September 1974
Most goals conceded in second half
6 goals - Bahrain, 29 February 2012
Fastest 2 goals to start the match
6 minute - (3 times)
Philippines, 25 September 1972
Cambodia, 6 April 1997
Philippines, 23 December 2002
Fastest 3 goals to start the match
12 minute - Cambodia, 6 April 1997
Fastest 2 goals scored
0 minutes - (2 times)
Yugoslavia, 9 September 1956
Singapore, 7 November 1969
Fastest 2 goals conceded to start the match
7 minute - (2 times)
South Korea, 7 December 1996
China, 16 October 2000
Fastest 3 goals conceded to start the match
10 minute - China, 16 October 2000
Fastest 2 goals conceded
1 minute - (2 times)
China, 20 April 1992
Saudi Arabia, 10 October 2003
Saudi Arabia, 17 October 2003
Sri Lanka, 8 September 2004
Longest unbeaten run
10 games from 8 August 1960 to 15 August 1961; from 14 September 1997 to 29 August 1998; from 30 October 1999 to 13 October 2000
Most consecutive wins
9 games from 21 November 1968 to 9 November 1969

== Competitive record ==
=== FIFA World Cup ===
FIFA World Cup record										Qualification record					
Year	Result	Position	Pld	W	D	L	GF	GA	Squad	Pld	W	D	L	GF	GA
as Dutch East Indies
(Uruguay) 1930	Did not enter									Declined invitation					
(Italy) 1934	Did not enter									Did not enter					
(France) 1938	Round of 16	15th	1	0	0	1	0	6	Squad	Qualified automatically					
as Indonesia
(Brazil) 1950	Withdrew									Withdrew					
(Switzerland) 1954	Did not enter									Did not enter					
(Sweden) 1958	Withdrew during qualification									3	1	1	1	5	4
(Chile) 1962	Withdrew									Withdrew					
(England) 1966	Did not enter									Did not enter					
(Mexico) 1970	Did not enter									Did not enter					
(West Germany) 1974	Did not qualify									6	1	2	3	6	13
(Argentina) 1978	Did not qualify									4	1	1	2	7	7
(Spain) 1982	Did not qualify									8	2	2	4	5	14
(Mexico) 1986	Did not qualify									8	4	1	3	9	10
(Italy) 1990	Did not qualify									6	1	3	2	5	10
(United States) 1994	Did not qualify									8	1	0	7	6	19
(France) 1998	Did not qualify									6	1	4	1	11	6
(South Korea) (Japan) 2002	Did not qualify									6	4	0	2	16	7
(Germany) 2006	Did not qualify									6	2	1	3	8	12
(South Africa) 2010	Did not qualify									2	0	0	2	1	11
(Brazil) 2014	Did not qualify									8	1	1	6	8	30
(Russia) 2018	Disqualified due to FIFA suspension									Disqualified					
(Qatar) 2022	Did not qualify									8	0	1	7	5	27
(Canada) (Mexico) (United States) 2026	Did not qualify									20	8	4	8	31	32
(Morocco) (Portugal) (Spain) 2030	To be determined									To be determined					
(Saudi Arabia) 2034	To be determined									To be determined					
Total	Round of 16	1/22	1	0	0	1	0	6	—	99	27	21	51	123	202

FIFA World Cup history
First match	Hungary 6–0 Dutch East Indies (5 June 1938; Reims, France)
Biggest win	—
Biggest defeat	Hungary 6–0 Dutch East Indies (5 June 1938; Reims, France)
Best result	Round of 16 (1938)
Worst result	—

=== AFC Asian Cup ===
AFC Asian Cup record										Qualification record					
Year	Result	Position	Pld	W	D	L	GF	GA	Squad	Pld	W	D	L	GF	GA
(Hong Kong) 1956	Withdrew									Withdrew before playing any matches					
(South Korea) 1960	Withdrew									Withdrew before playing any matches					
(Israel) 1964	Withdrew									Withdrew before playing any matches					
(Iran) 1968	Did not qualify									4	1	1	2	10	6
(Thailand) 1972	Did not qualify									5	3	0	2	12	6
(Iran) 1976	Did not qualify									4	1	1	2	3	5
(Kuwait) 1980	Did not qualify									3	0	0	3	3	10
(Singapore) 1984	Did not qualify									5	3	0	2	6	5
(Qatar) 1988	Did not qualify									3	1	1	1	1	4
(Japan) 1992	Did not qualify									3	1	1	1	3	4
(United Arab Emirates) 1996	Group stage	11th	3	0	1	2	4	8	Squad	2	1	1	0	7	1
(Lebanon) 2000	Group stage	11th	3	0	1	2	0	7	Squad	4	3	1	0	18	5
(China) 2004	Group stage	11th	3	1	0	2	3	9	Squad	6	3	1	2	9	13
(Indonesia) (Malaysia) (Thailand) (Vietnam) 2007	Group stage	11th	3	1	0	2	3	4	Squad	Qualified as co-hosts					
(Qatar) 2011	Did not qualify									6	0	3	3	3	6
(Australia) 2015	Did not qualify									6	0	1	5	2	8
(United Arab Emirates) 2019	Disqualified due to FIFA suspension									Disqualified					
(Qatar) 2023	Round of 16	16th	4	1	0	3	3	10	Squad	13	4	1	8	19	30
(Saudi Arabia) 2027	Qualified									8	5	1	2	20	8
Total	Round of 16	6/19	16	3	2	11	13	38	—	72	26	13	33	116	111

AFC Asian Cup history
First match	Indonesia 2–2 Kuwait (4 December 1996; Abu Dhabi, United Arab Emirates)
Biggest win	Qatar 1–2 Indonesia (18 July 2004; Beijing, China); Indonesia 2–1 Bahrain (10 July 2007; Jakarta, Indonesia); Vietnam 0–1 Indonesia (19 January 2024; Doha, Qatar)
Biggest defeat	Indonesia 0–5 China (21 July 2004; Beijing, China)
Best result	Round of 16 (2023)
Worst result	Group stage (1996, 2000, 2004, 2007)

=== FIFA ASEAN Cup ===
FIFA ASEAN Cup record
Year	Result	Position	Pld	W	D	L	GF	GA	Squad
(Indonesia) 2026	Champions	1st	4	2	2	0	13	4	Squad
Total	1 Title	1/1	4	2	2	0	13	4	—

FIFA ASEAN Cup history
First match	Indonesia 2–0 Singapore (25 September 2026; Jakarta, Indonesia)
Biggest win	Indonesia 9–2 Bangladesh (1 October 2026; Jakarta, Indonesia)
Biggest defeat	—
Best result	Champions (2026)
Worst result	—

=== ASEAN Championship ===
ASEAN Championship record
Year	Result	Position	Pld	W	D	L	GF	GA	Squad
(Singapore) 1996	Fourth place	4th	6	3	1	2	18	9	Squad
(Vietnam) 1998	Third place	3rd	5	2	1	2	15	10	Squad
(Thailand) 2000	Runners-up	2nd	5	3	0	2	13	10	Squad
(Indonesia) (Singapore) 2002	Runners-up	2nd	6	3	3	0	22	7	Squad
(Malaysia) (Vietnam) 2004	Runners-up	2nd	8	4	1	3	24	8	Squad
(Singapore) (Thailand) 2007	Group stage	5th	3	1	2	0	6	4	Squad
(Indonesia) (Thailand) 2008	Semi-finals	4th	5	2	0	3	8	5	Squad
(Indonesia) (Vietnam) 2010	Runners-up	2nd	7	6	0	1	17	6	Squad
(Malaysia) (Thailand) 2012	Group stage	5th	3	1	1	1	3	4	Squad
(Singapore) (Vietnam) 2014	Group stage	5th	3	1	1	1	7	7	Squad
(Myanmar) (Philippines) 2016	Runners-up	2nd	7	3	2	2	12	13	Squad
(ASEAN) 2018	Group stage	7th	4	1	1	2	5	6	Squad
(Singapore) 2020	Runners-up	2nd	8	4	3	1	20	13	Squad
(ASEAN) 2022	Semi-finals	4th	6	3	2	1	12	5	Squad
(ASEAN) 2024	Group stage	7th	4	1	1	2	4	5	Squad
(ASEAN) 2026	Group stage	5th	4	2	1	1	9	5	Squad
Total	Runners-up	16/16	84	40	20	24	195	117	—

ASEAN Championship history
First match	Indonesia 5–1 Laos (2 September 1996; Jurong, Singapore)
Biggest win	Indonesia 13–1 Philippines (23 December 2002; Jakarta, Indonesia)
Biggest defeat	Philippines 4–0 Indonesia (25 November 2014; Hanoi, Vietnam); Indonesia 0–4 Thailand (29 December 2021; Kallang, Singapore)
Best result	Runners-up (2000, 2002, 2004, 2010, 2016, 2020)
Worst result	Group stage (2007, 2012, 2014, 2018, 2024, 2026)

=== Olympic Games ===
Olympic Games record										Qualification record					
Year	Result	Position	Pld	W	D	L	GF	GA	Squad	Pld	W	D	L	GF	GA
1900 to 1952	Did not enter									Did not enter					
(Australia) 1956	Quarter-finals	7th	2	0	1	1	0	4	Squad	Qualified automatically					
(Italy) 1960	Did not qualify									2	0	0	2	2	6
(Japan) 1964	Withdrew									Withdrew					
(Mexico) 1968	Did not qualify									4	1	1	2	4	5
(West Germany) 1972	Did not qualify									4	2	0	2	8	6
(Canada) 1976	Did not qualify									4	2	1	1	11	5
(Soviet Union) 1980	Did not qualify									5	1	0	4	7	12
(United States) 1984	Did not qualify									8	0	3	5	3	14
(South Korea) 1988	Did not qualify									4	1	0	3	3	8
Since 1992	See Indonesia national under-23 football team														
Total	Quarter-finals	1/19	2	0	1	1	0	4	—	31	7	5	19	38	56

Olympic Games history
First match	Soviet Union 0–0 Indonesia (29 November 1956; Melbourne, Australia)
Last match	Soviet Union 4–0 Indonesia (1 December 1956; Melbourne, Australia)
Biggest win	—
Biggest defeat	Soviet Union 4–0 Indonesia (1 December 1956; Melbourne, Australia)
Best result	Seventh place (1956)
Worst result	—

=== Asian Games ===
Asian Games record
Year	Result	Position	Pld	W	D	L	GF	GA	Squad
(India) 1951	Quarter-finals	6th	1	0	0	1	0	3	Squad
(Philippines) 1954	Fourth place	4th	4	2	0	2	15	12	Squad
(Japan) 1958	Bronze medalist	3rd	5	4	0	1	15	7	Squad
(Indonesia) 1962	Group stage	5th	3	2	0	1	9	3	Squad
(Thailand) 1966	Quarter-finals	5th	5	2	2	1	8	4	Squad
(Thailand) 1970	Quarter-finals	5th	5	1	2	2	4	7	Squad
(Iran) 1974	Did not participate								
(Thailand) 1978	Did not participate								
(India) 1982	Did not participate								
(South Korea) 1986	Fourth place	4th	6	1	2	3	4	14	Squad
(China) 1990	Did not participate								
(Japan) 1994	Did not participate								
(Thailand) 1998	Did not participate								
Since 2002	See Indonesia national under-23 football team								
Total	Bronze medal	7/13	29	12	6	11	55	50	—

Asian Games history
First match	India 3–0 Indonesia (5 March 1951; New Delhi, India)
Last match	Indonesia 0–5 Kuwait (4 October 1986; Seoul, South Korea)
Biggest win	Indonesia 6–0 Philippines (27 August 1962; Jakarta, Indonesia)
Biggest defeat	Indonesia 0–5 Kuwait (4 October 1986; Seoul, South Korea)
Best result	Bronze medalist (1958)
Worst result	Sixth place (1951)

=== Southeast Asian Games ===
Southeast Asian Games record
Year	Result	Position	Pld	W	D	L	GF	GA
1959 to 1975	Did not participate							
(Malaysia) 1977	Fourth place	4th	4	2	2	0	8	3
(Indonesia) 1979	Silver medalist	2nd	6	2	2	2	6	5
(Philippines) 1981	Bronze medalist	3rd	4	3	0	1	5	2
(Singapore) 1983	Group stage	5th	3	1	1	1	3	7
(Thailand) 1985	Fourth place	4th	4	0	1	3	1	10
(Indonesia) 1987	Gold medalist	1st	4	3	1	0	7	1
(Malaysia) 1989	Bronze medalist	3rd	5	2	1	2	12	5
(Philippines) 1991	Gold medalist	1st	5	3	2	0	5	1
(Singapore) 1993	Fourth place	4th	5	2	1	2	6	6
(Thailand) 1995	Group stage	6th	4	2	0	2	14	3
(Indonesia) 1997	Silver medalist	2nd	6	4	2	0	16	6
(Brunei) 1999	Bronze medalist	3rd	6	3	2	1	11	2
Since 2001	See Indonesia national under-23 football team							
Total	Gold medal	1st	56	27	15	14	94	51

Southeast Asian Games history
First match	Malaysia 1–2 Indonesia (19 November 1977; Kuala Lumpur, Malaysia)
Last match	Indonesia 0–0 (4–3 pen.) Singapore (14 August 1999; Bandar Seri Begawan, Brunei)
Biggest win	Indonesia 10–0 Cambodia (6 December 1995; Thailand)
Biggest defeat	Thailand 7–0 Indonesia (15 December 1985; Bangkok, Thailand)
Best result	Gold medalist (1987, 1991)
Worst result	Group stage (1983, 1995)

=== Minor tournaments ===
==== Independence Cup ====
Indonesia Independence Cup record
Year	Result
1985	Group Stage
1986	Group Stage
1987	Champions
1988	Runners Up
1990	Third Place
1992	Runners Up
1994	Group Stage
2000	Champions
2008	Champions
Total	Champions

== Head-to-head record ==
As of 5 October 2026 after match against Thailand. (Note: Doesn't include B team, selection, junior, club, etc)

More wins Wins equal losses More losses

Indonesia national football team head-to-head records
Against	First	Last	GP	W	D	L	GF	GA	GD	% Win	Confederation
Afghanistan	2021	2021	2	0	0	2	2	4	−2	0%	AFC
Algeria	1986	1986	1	0	0	1	0	1	−1	0%	CAF
Andorra	2014	2014	1	1	0	0	1	0	1	100%	UEFA
Argentina	2023	2023	1	0	0	1	0	2	−2	0%	CONMEBOL
Australia	1967	2025	18	1	4	13	7	39	−32	5.56%	AFC
Bahrain	1980	2025	9	3	3	3	10	21	−11	33.33%	AFC
Bangladesh	1975	2026	7	5	1	1	20	5	15	71.43%	AFC
Bhutan	2003	2003	2	2	0	0	4	0	4	100%	AFC
Bosnia and Herzegovina	1997	1997	1	0	0	1	0	2	−2	0%	UEFA
Brunei	1971	2023	13	9	2	2	52	6	46	73.33%	AFC
Bulgaria	1973	2026	2	0	0	2	0	5	−5	0%	UEFA
Burundi	2023	2023	2	1	1	0	5	3	2	75%	CAF
Cambodia	1966	2026	25	20	3	2	96	18	78	80%	AFC
Cameroon	2012	2015	2	0	1	1	0	1	−1	25%	CAF
China	1934	2025	18	2	3	13	13	38	−25	11.11%	AFC
Chinese Taipei	1954	2025	15	11	0	4	37	14	23	73.33%	AFC
Croatia	1956	1956	1	0	0	1	2	5	−3	0%	UEFA
Czech Republic (Note: Includes matches against Czechoslovakia.)	1974	1974	1	0	1	0	1	1	0	25%	UEFA
Cuba	2014	2014	1	0	0	1	0	1	−1	0%	CONCACAF
Curaçao	2022	2022	2	2	0	0	5	3	2	100%	CONCACAF
Denmark	1974	1974	1	0	0	1	0	9	−9	0%	UEFA
Dominican Republic	2014	2014	1	0	1	0	1	1	0	50%	CONCACAF
East Germany	1956	1959	2	0	1	1	3	5	−2	25%	UEFA
Egypt (Note: Includes matches against the United Arab Republic.)	1963	1963	2	0	1	1	3	5	−2	16.67%	CAF
Estonia	1996	1999	2	0	1	1	0	3	−3	25%	UEFA
Fiji	1981	2017	3	0	3	0	3	3	0	50%	OFC
Guinea	1966	1966	1	0	0	1	1	3	−2	0%	CAF
Guyana	2017	2017	1	1	0	0	2	1	1	100%	CONCACAF
Hong Kong	1957	2018	19	10	4	5	36	27	9	63.16%	AFC
Hungary	1938	1938	1	0	0	1	0	6	−6	0%	UEFA
Iceland	2018	2018	2	0	0	2	1	10	−9	0%	UEFA
India	1951	2004	21	10	2	9	41	36	5	50%	AFC
Iran	1956	2024	6	0	1	5	3	16	−13	8.33%	AFC
Iraq	1968	2025	14	2	3	9	11	28	−17	14.29%	AFC
Israel	1971	1971	1	0	0	1	0	1	−1	0%	UEFA
Jamaica	2007	2007	1	1	0	0	2	1	1	100%	CONCACAF
Japan	1934	2025	19	4	2	13	24	48	−24	21.05%	AFC
Jordan	2004	2022	5	0	0	5	2	13	−11	0%	AFC
Kyrgyzstan	2013	2013	1	1	0	0	4	0	4	50%	AFC
Kuwait	1980	2022	7	2	3	2	8	12	−4	50%	AFC
Laos	1969	2021	10	9	1	0	45	9	36	95%	AFC
Lebanon	2025	2025	1	0	1	0	0	0	0	0%	AFC
Liberia	1984	2007	2	1	0	1	3	3	0	50%	CAF
Libya	2024	2024	2	0	0	2	1	6	−5	25%	CAF
Lithuania	1996	1999	2	0	1	1	2	6	−4	25%	UEFA
Malaysia	1957	2026	80	36	19	25	132	103	29	45%	AFC
Maldives	2001	2010	3	3	0	0	10	0	10	100%	AFC
Mali	1963	1963	1	1	0	0	3	2	1	100%	CAF
Mauritania	2012	2012	1	1	0	0	2	0	2	100%	CAF
Mauritius	2018	2018	1	1	0	0	1	0	1	100%	CAF
Moldova	1996	2003	1	1	0	1	5	2	−1	0%	UEFA
Morocco	1980	1980	1	0	0	1	0	2	−2	0%	CAF
Mozambique	2026	2026	1	1	0	0	1	0	+1	100%	CAF
Myanmar	1951	2021	46	20	9	17	85	63	22	53.26%	AFC
Netherlands	1938	2013	2	0	0	2	2	12	−12	0%	UEFA
Nepal	2014	2022	2	2	0	0	9	0	9	100%	AFC
New Zealand	1972	1997	9	2	5	2	8	9	−1	55%	OFC
North Korea	1963	2012	11	0	2	9	5	25	−20	11.11%	AFC
Oman	2007	2026	5	1	1	3	5	6	−1	20%	AFC
Pakistan	1960	2014	5	4	1	0	15	3	12	91.67%	AFC
Palestine	2011	2023	3	1	1	1	5	3	2	50%	AFC
Papua New Guinea	1975	1984	2	1	0	1	8	3	5	50%	OFC
Paraguay	1986	1986	1	0	0	1	2	3	−1	0%	CONMEBOL
Philippines	1934	2024	30	23	5	2	100	20	80	87.93%	AFC
Puerto Rico	2017	2017	1	0	1	0	0	0	0	50%	CONCACAF
Qatar	1986	2014	7	1	2	4	9	18	−9	22.22%	AFC
Russia (Note: Includes matches against the Soviet Union.)	1956	1976	3	0	2	1	0	4	−4	37.5%	UEFA
Saudi Arabia	1983	2025	17	1	4	12	12	40	−28	5.88%	AFC
Saint Kitts and Nevis	2026	2026	1	1	0	0	4	0	4	100%	CONCACAF
Senegal	1982	1982	1	0	1	0	2	2	0	50%	CAF
Serbia (Note: Includes matches against Yugoslavia and Serbia and Montenegro.)	1956	1956	2	0	0	2	3	9	−6	0%	UEFA
Singapore	1958	2026	63	34	12	17	120	72	48	53.97%	AFC
South Korea	1953	2007	37	3	5	29	22	87	−65	16.67%	AFC
Sri Lanka	1964	2004	6	5	1	0	29	6	23	91.67%	AFC
Syria	1978	2014	5	1	0	4	3	15	−12	20%	AFC
Tanzania	1997	2024	2	1	1	0	3	1	2	50%	CAF
Thailand	1957	2026	98	32	19	47	123	169	−46	41.84%	AFC
Timor-Leste	2010	2022	6	6	0	0	21	2	19	100%	AFC
Turkmenistan	2004	2023	5	3	1	1	11	8	3	70%	AFC
United Arab Emirates	1981	2021	5	1	1	3	8	16	−8	33.33%	AFC
Uruguay	1974	2010	3	1	0	2	5	11	−6	33.33%	CONMEBOL
Uzbekistan	1997	1997	2	0	1	1	1	4	−3	25%	AFC
Vanuatu	2019	2019	1	1	0	0	6	0	6	100%	OFC
Vietnam (Note: Includes matches against South Vietnam and North Vietnam.)	1957	2026	50	23	12	15	78	65	13	46%	AFC
Yemen (Note: Includes matches against South Yemen.)	1987	2014	7	3	4	0	8	3	5	83.33%	AFC
Zimbabwe	1997	1997	1	0	1	0	0	0	0	50%	CAF
86 Countries	1934	2026	869	331	167	369	1410	1419	–9	38.09%	FIFA

== See also ==
- Indonesia at the AFC Asian Cup
- Indonesia at the FIFA World Cup
