= 1971 Jakarta Anniversary Tournament =

Tournament details
- Host country: Indonesia
- Dates: 5–16 June
- Teams: 6
- Venue: 1 (in 1 host city)

Final positions
- Champions: Burma (1st title)
- Runners-up: Indonesia
- Third place: Malaysia
- Fourth place: Khmer Republic

The 1971 Jakarta Anniversary Tournament was the second edition of the Jakarta Anniversary Tournament, an association football tournament held to commemorate the establishment of the Jakarta Government. It was held from 5 to 16 June 1971 in Jakarta. Burma won the tournament by beating hosts Indonesia 1–0 in the final.

== Teams ==
Nine teams participated in this edition, an increase of three from six in the previous year.

- Indonesia (host)
- Malaysia
- Khmer Republic
- Burma
- Singapore
- Western Australia
- South Korea B
- Thailand
- India

== Stadium ==
City	Stadium	Capacity
Jakarta	Senayan Stadium	88,083

== First stage ==
=== Group A ===
Team	Pld	W	D	L	GF	GA	GD	Pts
Burma	2	1	1	0	7	1	+6	3
Indonesia	2	1	1	0	4	1	+3	3
Singapore	2	0	0	2	0	9	−9	0

Source: RSSSF
5 June 1971

Indonesia	3–0	Singapore
Iswadi Idris 3', 12'; Abdul Kadir 78'	Report

Senayan Stadium, Jakarta
Attendance: 60,000

7 June 1971

Indonesia	1–1	Burma
Abdul Kadir 36'	Report	Khin Maing Tint 16'

Senayan Stadium, Jakarta

9 June 1971

Burma	6–0	Singapore
Maung Kyaw Min 14', 30', 58'; Ye Nyunt 54', 68', 73'	Report

Senayan Stadium, Jakarta

=== Group B ===
Team	Pld	W	D	L	GF	GA	GD	Pts
Malaysia	2	1	1	0	4	3	+1	3
Khmer Republic	2	0	2	0	3	3	0	2
West Australia	2	0	1	1	4	5	−1	1

Source: RSSSF
6 June 1971

Khmer Republic	2–2	Western Australia
	Report	John Van Oosten; Ray Ilott

Senayan Stadium, Jakarta

8 June 1971

Khmer Republic	1–1	Malaysia
	Report

Senayan Stadium, Jakarta

9 June 1971

Malaysia	3–2	Western Australia
	Report	John Van Oosten; Ray Ilott

Senayan Stadium, Jakarta

=== Group C ===
Team	Pld	W	D	L	GF	GA	GD	Pts
Thailand	2	2	0	0	2	0	+2	4
South Korea B	2	1	0	1	—	—	—	2
India	2	0	0	2	—	—	—	0

Source: RSSSF
5 June 1971

South Korea B	0–1	Thailand
	Report	Suwantada (??)

Senayan Stadium, Jakarta
Attendance: 60,000

6 June 1971

Thailand	1–0	India
	Report

Senayan Stadium, Jakarta

June 1971

South Korea B	v	India
	Report

Senayan Stadium, Jakarta

=== Group X ===
Team	Pld	W	D	L	GF	GA	GD	Pts
Burma	2	2	0	0	6	1	+5	4
Malaysia	2	1	0	1	3	6	−3	2
South Korea B	2	0	0	2	1	3	−2	0

Source: RSSSF
11 June 1971

Burma	5–1	Malaysia
Ye Nyunt 11'; Than Soe 46'; Khin Maing Tint 75', 85'; Win Maung 89'	Report	Abdullah Mohammad 21'

Senayan Stadium, Jakarta
Attendance: 50,000

12 June 1971

Burma	1–0	South Korea B
Khin Maing Tint 64'	Report

Senayan Stadium, Jakarta

13 June 1971

Malaysia	2–1	South Korea B
Yap Eng Kok 6', 64'	Report	Kang Chong-tae 30'

Senayan Stadium, Jakarta

== Second stage ==
=== Group Y ===
Team	Pld	W	D	L	GF	GA	GD	Pts
Indonesia	2	1	1	0	1	0	+1	3
Khmer Republic	2	1	0	1	3	1	+2	2
Thailand	2	0	1	1	0	3	−3	1

Source: RSSSF
11 June 1971

Indonesia	0–0	Thailand
	Report

Senayan Stadium, Jakarta

12 June 1971

Khmer Republic	3–0	Thailand
Doeur Sokhom 23'; Miladord 30'; Tes Sean 80'	Report

Stadium Senayan, Jakarta
Attendance: 45,000

after the final whistle, Thai players started a brawl which led to a six month suspension of the team by the FAT

13 June 1971

Indonesia	1–0	Khmer Republic
Abdul Kadir 74'	Report

Senayan Stadium, Jakarta

=== Fifth place match ===
16 June 1971

Thailand	t/b	South Korea B
	Report

Senayan Stadium, Jakarta

not played, Thailand returned home after player brawl in last group match against the Khmer Republic.

== Knockout stage ==
Semi-finals
14 Jun – Senayan Stadium
Indonesia	2
Malaysia	1
14 Jun – Senayan Stadium
Burma	8
Khmer Republic	0

Final
16 Jun – Senayan Stadium
Indonesia	0
Burma	1
Third place
15 Jun – Senayan Stadium
Malaysia	2
Khmer Republic	1

=== Semifinals ===
14 June 1971

Indonesia	2–1	Malaysia
	Report

Senayan Stadium, Jakarta
Attendance: 75,000
Referee: Kim Yin-Young (South Korea)
14 June 1971

Burma	8–0	Khmer Republic
	Report

Senayan Stadium, Jakarta

=== Third place match ===
15 June 1971

Malaysia	2–1	Khmer Republic
	Report

Senayan Stadium, Jakarta

=== Final ===
16 June 1971

Indonesia	0–1	Burma
	Report	Win Maung 85'

Senayan Stadium, Jakarta
Attendance: 90,000

== Post-tournament friendlies ==
19 June 1971

PSM Makassar	2–0	Burma
Anwar Ramang 48'; Karno Wahid 64'	Report

Senayan Stadium, Jakarta
20 June 1971

Persija Jakarta	0–3	West Australia
	Report

Senayan Stadium, Jakarta
20 June 1971

Indonesia	0–6	PSV Eindhoven
	Report	Willy van der Kuijlen 11', 40'; Guus Hiddink 52'; Bent Schmidt Hansen 58'; Eef Mulders 63'; Willie Heyink 78'

Senayan Stadium, Jakarta
