= Doeur Sokhom =

Cambodian footballer (died 1975)

Personal information
- Date of birth: 1937
- Date of death: 1975 (aged 37)
- Place of death: Kampuchea
- Position: Forward

Senior career*
Years	Team	Apps	(Gls)
- Municipalité de Phnom Penh

International career
1967–1974	Cambodia/Khmer Republic	11+	(11+)
1972	Khmer Republic military	1+	(1+)
- * Club domestic league appearances and goals

Doeur Sokhom (1937 – 1975) was a Cambodian footballer who played as a forward.

== Career ==
Sokhom's first known appearance for the Cambodia national team was in 1967, during a 1–0 win against Pakistan in 1968 AFC Asian Cup qualification. In 1972, he represented the Khmer Republic military team at the Spring Tree Cup, a tournament in South Vietnam to raise money for the country's armed forces, with Sokhom scoring in the final against the South Vietnam army. That same year, he was part of the Khmer Republic national team's squad at the 1972 AFC Asian Cup, scoring four goals as the Khmer Republic finished fourth.

In 1973, he helped the Khmer Republic reach the final of the President's Cup in South Korea, where they drew in the final against Burma and shared the title. He also played for the Khmer Republic at the 1971 and 1974 tournaments, as well as the 1970 King's Cup and the 1971 and 1972 Jakarta Anniversary Tournaments.

== Personal life and legacy ==
Sokhom died during the Cambodian genocide, with reports saying he died in 1975, at the age of 37.

In September 2021, Sokhom was selected by the IFFHS as part of their all-time Cambodia dream team.
