= Waskito =

Former Indonesian professional football player

Personal information
- Full name: Kainun Waskito
- Date of birth: 29 January 1949 (age 77)
- Place of birth: Ponorogo, Indonesia
- Height: 1.66 m (5 ft 5 1/2 in)
- Position: Forward

Youth career
- 1966: Diklat Salatiga

Senior career*
| Years | Team | Apps | (Gls) |
| 1967–1973 | Persema Malang | 14 | (8) |
| 1973–1978 | Persebaya Surabaya | 83 | (30) |

International career
| 1966–1969 | Indonesia U19 | 9 | (8) |
| 1967–1977 | Indonesia | 80 | (31) |
- * Club domestic league appearances and goals

Kainun Waskito (born 29 January 1949), known mononymously as Waskito, is an Indonesian former professional footballer who played as a forward. He is the sixth highest all-time goalscorer for the Indonesia national team with 31 goals and the fourth most-capped player for the national team with 80 appearances.

== Club career ==
=== Early career ===
Born in Ponorogo, Waskito joined Diklat Salatiga's youth system to began his football career before moving to Persebaya Surabaya in 1967.

=== Persebaya Surabaya ===
Waskito had a remarkable season in 1975 with Persebaya Surabaya in the Perserikatan, where he achieved the distinction of being the top scorer of the competition. On 22 October, he scored his first goal of the season by scoring one goal and making it 5–0 against PSL Langkat. He also scored another goal when his team was able to win over PPSM Magelang 4–0 and held Persipal Palu 2–2. Each he scored 1 goal in one match. Finally Persebaya qualified for the quarter-finals by being in second place under Persipal Palu with the same points, namely 6 but losing on goal difference.

In the quarter-final match which was held at Gelora Senayan Stadium, he was able to bring his team to a 7–0 win over Persema Malang. He scored two goals and his second goal also became the winner for his team. In other matches in the quarter-finals, he also scored a penalty goal in the 22nd minute against PSMS Medan and also against Persiraja Banda Aceh and his goal was also the equalizer. However, in the semifinal match which was held on Thursday, 6 November 1975, his team had to surrender to Persija Jakarta 2–0 through goals from Iswadi Idris and Risdianto. In the match for third place, he managed to bring Persebaya ahead of Persipura in 35 minutes while bringing his team to win 4–2.

== International career ==
Waskito made his debut for Indonesia in the under-19 team, where he played a significant role in leading the team to a runner-up finish in the AFC Youth Championship in 1967. Throughout his youth international career with the Indonesia U19 team, he played a total of 6 matches and successfully scored 6 goals.

He was first called up by the senior team during the 1967 Merdeka Tournament in Kuala Lumpur, Malaysia. His debut took place on 11 August, in the opening match against South Korea, which ended in a 1–3 defeat. His international debut goal occurred during his second cap while competing in the tournament semi-finals. He scored the only goal for Indonesia in a 1–2 defeat against Hong Kong.

In 1971, he was selected to be included in the Indonesian national team squad which would prepare for the 1972 Olympics in Yangon, Burma.

== Career statistics ==
=== International ===
Appearances and goals by national team and year
| National team | Year | Apps | Goals |
|---|---|---|---|
| Indonesia | 1967 | 2 | 1 |
| Indonesia | 1968 | 1 | 1 |
| Indonesia | 1970 | 12 | 8 |
| Indonesia | 1971 | 9 | 7 |
| Indonesia | 1972 | 17 | 5 |
| Indonesia | 1973 | 6 | 0 |
| Indonesia | 1974 | 8 | 2 |
| Indonesia | 1975 | 15 | 5 |
| Indonesia | 1976 | 7 | 1 |
| Indonesia | 1977 | 3 | 1 |
| Total | | 80 | 31 |

Scores and results list Indonesia's goal tally first, score column indicates score after each Waskito goal.

List of international goals scored by Kainun Waskito
| No. | Date | Venue | Opponent | Score | Result | Competition | Ref. |
|---|---|---|---|---|---|---|---|
| 1 | 23 August 1967 | Merdeka Stadium, Kuala Lumpur, Malaysia | Hong Kong | — | 1–2 | 1967 Merdeka Tournament | |
| 2 | 26 November 1968 | Bangkok, Thailand | Singapore | 5–0 | 7–0 | 1968 King's Cup | |
| 3 | 27 June 1970 | Jakarta, Indonesia | Hong Kong | — | 3–2 | 1970 Jakarta Anniversary Tournament | |
| 4 | 27 June 1970 | Jakarta, Indonesia | Hong Kong | — | 3–2 | 1970 Jakarta Anniversary Tournament | |
| 5 | 9 November 1970 | Bangkok, Thailand | South Vietnam | 1–0 | 5–3 | 1970 King's Cup | |
| 6 | 9 November 1970 | Bangkok, Thailand | South Vietnam | 2–0 | 5–3 | 1970 King's Cup | |
| 7 | 9 November 1970 | Bangkok, Thailand | South Vietnam | — | 5–3 | 1970 King's Cup | |
| 8 | 15 November 1970 | Bangkok, Thailand | Cambodia | 2–0 | 4–2 | 1970 King's Cup | |
| 9 | 15 November 1970 | Bangkok, Thailand | Cambodia | 4–0 | 4–2 | 1970 King's Cup | |
| 10 | 18 November 1970 | Bangkok, Thailand | Thailand | — | 1–2 | 1970 King's Cup | |
| 11 | 7 August 1971 | Merdeka Stadium, Kuala Lumpur, Malaysia | India | 1–1 | 3–1 | 1971 Merdeka Tournament | |
| 12 | 7 August 1971 | Merdeka Stadium, Kuala Lumpur, Malaysia | India | 2–1 | 3–1 | 1971 Merdeka Tournament | |
| 13 | 7 August 1971 | Merdeka Stadium, Kuala Lumpur, Malaysia | India | 3–1 | 3–1 | 1971 Merdeka Tournament | |
| 14 | 11 August 1971 | Merdeka Stadium, Kuala Lumpur, Malaysia | Philippines | 1–0 | 3–1 | 1971 Merdeka Tournament | |
| 15 | 13 August 1971 | Perak Stadium, Ipoh, Malaysia | Singapore | 1–0 | 4–0 | 1971 Merdeka Tournament | |
| 16 | 13 August 1971 | Perak Stadium, Ipoh, Malaysia | Singapore | 3–0 | 4–0 | 1971 Merdeka Tournament | |
| 17 | 13 August 1971 | Perak Stadium, Ipoh, Malaysia | Singapore | 4–0 | 4–0 | 1971 Merdeka Tournament | |
| 18 | 25 March 1972 | Bogyoke Aung San Stadium, Yangon, Myanmar | India | 2–0 | 4–0 | 1972 Summer Olympics qualification | |
| 19 | 25 March 1972 | Bogyoke Aung San Stadium, Yangon, Myanmar | India | 3–0 | 4–0 | 1972 Summer Olympics qualification | |
| 20 | 11 June 1962 | Jakarta, Indonesia | Sri Lanka | 8–0 | 8–0 | 1972 Jakarta Anniversary Tournament | |
| 21 | 8 August 1972 | Singapore | Khmer Republic | — | 5–0 | Friendly | |
| 22 | 28 September 1972 | Dongdaemun Stadium, Seoul, South Korea | Malaysia | 1–1 | 3–1 | 1972 President's Cup | |
| 23 | 21 May 1974 | Senayan Main Stadium, Jakarta, Indonesia | Australia | 1–2 | 1–2 | Friendly | |
| 24 | 7 June 1974 | Jakarta, Indonesia | Malaysia | — | 4–3 | 1974 Jakarta Anniversary Tournament | |
| 25 | 14 June 1975 | Jakarta, Indonesia | Malaysia | — | 3–1 | 1975 Jakarta Anniversary Tournament | |
| 26 | 29 July 1975 | Merdeka Stadium, Kuala Lumpur, Malaysia | Bangladesh | — | 4-0 | 1975 Merdeka Tournament | |
| 27 | 29 July 1975 | Merdeka Stadium, Kuala Lumpur, Malaysia | Bangladesh | — | 4-0 | 1975 Merdeka Tournament | |
| 28 | 3 August 1975 | Merdeka Stadium, Kuala Lumpur, Malaysia | Hong Kong | — | 3–2 | 1975 Merdeka Tournament | |
| 29 | 7 August 1975 | Merdeka Stadium, Kuala Lumpur, Malaysia | Japan | — | 1–4 | 1975 Merdeka Tournament | |
| 30 | 17 February 1976 | Jakarta, Indonesia | Papua New Guinea | — | 8–2 | 1976 Summer Olympics qualification | |
| 31 | 28 February 1977 | National Stadium, Singapore | Hong Kong | 1–0 | 1–4 | 1978 FIFA World Cup qualification | |

== Honours ==
Persebaya Surabaya

- Perserikatan (1): 1975–78

Indonesia U19

- AFC Youth Championship runner-up: 1967

Indonesia

- King's Cup (1): 1968
- Pesta Sukan Cup (1): 1972
- Jakarta Anniversary Tournament (1): 1972
