= 1973 President's Cup Football Tournament =

1973 President's Cup
Tournament details
- Host country: South Korea
- Dates: 22–30 September
- Teams: 6

Final positions
- Champions: Burma (3rd title); Khmer Republic (1st title)
- Third place: South Korea
- Fourth place: Malaysia

Tournament statistics
- Matches played: 10
- Goals scored: 34 (3.4 per match)
- Top scorer(s): (South Korea) Kim Jin-kook (South Korea) Kim Jae-han (Malaysia) R. Visvanathan (South Korea) Cha Bum-kun (3 goals each)

The 1973 President's Cup Football Tournament (Korean: 제3회 박대통령컵 쟁탈 아시아축구대회) was the third competition of Korea Cup. The competition was held from 22 to 30 September 1973. Burma and the Khmer Republic played out a 0–0 draw and shared the trophy.

== Group stage ==
=== Group A ===
Team	Pld	W	D	L	GF	GA	GD	Pts	Qualification
South Korea	2	2	0	0	9	1	+8	4	Qualification to semi-finals
Khmer Republic	2	1	0	1	3	8	−5	2	Qualification to semi-finals
Indonesia	2	0	0	2	3	6	−3	0	

22 September 1973

South Korea	6–0	Khmer Republic
Kim Jin-kook 5', 24'; Cha Bum-kun 14', 32'; Kim Jae-han 53'; Park Lee-chun 72' (pen.)	Report

Dongdaemun Stadium, Seoul
Attendance: 25,000

24 September 1973

South Korea	3–1	Indonesia
Kim Jae-han 11', 79'; Kim Jin-kook 73'	Report	Kadir 21'

Dongdaemun Stadium, Seoul
Attendance: 30,000

26 September 1973

Indonesia	2–3	Khmer Republic
Asmara 4'; Kadir 88'	Report	Sea 47', 57'; Chin 59'

Dongdaemun Stadium, Seoul

=== Group B ===
Team	Pld	W	D	L	GF	GA	GD	Pts	Qualification
Malaysia	2	2	0	0	8	2	+6	4	Qualification to semi-finals
Burma	2	0	1	1	3	5	−2	1	Qualification to semi-finals
Thailand	2	0	1	1	3	7	−4	1	

22 September 1973

Burma	2–2	Thailand
Win Lay Sein 21'; Maung Maung Tin 74' (pen.)	Report	Sutdha 34'; Niwatana 86'

Dongdaemun Stadium, Seoul

24 September 1973

Thailand	1–5	Malaysia
Manus 12'	Report	Choon Wah 1', 66'; Afandi 3'; Mokhtar 81'; Abdullah 89'

Dongdaemun Stadium, Seoul

26 September 1973

Burma	1–3	Malaysia
Win Maung 59'	Report	Visvanathan 8', 52', 68'

Dongdaemun Stadium, Seoul

== Knockout stage ==
=== Bracket ===
Semi-finals
28 September – Seoul
South Korea	0
Burma	1
28 September – Seoul
Malaysia	0
Khmer Republic	2

Final
30 September – Seoul
Burma (a.e.t.)	0
Khmer Republic	0
Third place play-off
30 September – Seoul
South Korea	2
Malaysia	0

=== Semi-finals ===
28 September 1973

South Korea	0–1	Burma
	Report	Tin Win 30'

Dongdaemun Stadium, Seoul

28 September 1973

Malaysia	0–2	Khmer Republic
	Report	Sok 63'; Doeur 89'

Dongdaemun Stadium, Seoul

=== Third place play-off ===
30 September 1973

South Korea	2–0	Malaysia
Cha Bum-kun 14'; Kang Tae-hyun 70'	Report

Dongdaemun Stadium, Seoul

=== Final ===
30 September 1973

Burma	0–0 (a.e.t.)	Khmer Republic

Dongdaemun Stadium, Seoul

== See also ==
- Korea Cup
- South Korea national football team results
