= Jacob Sihasale =

Indonesian footballer

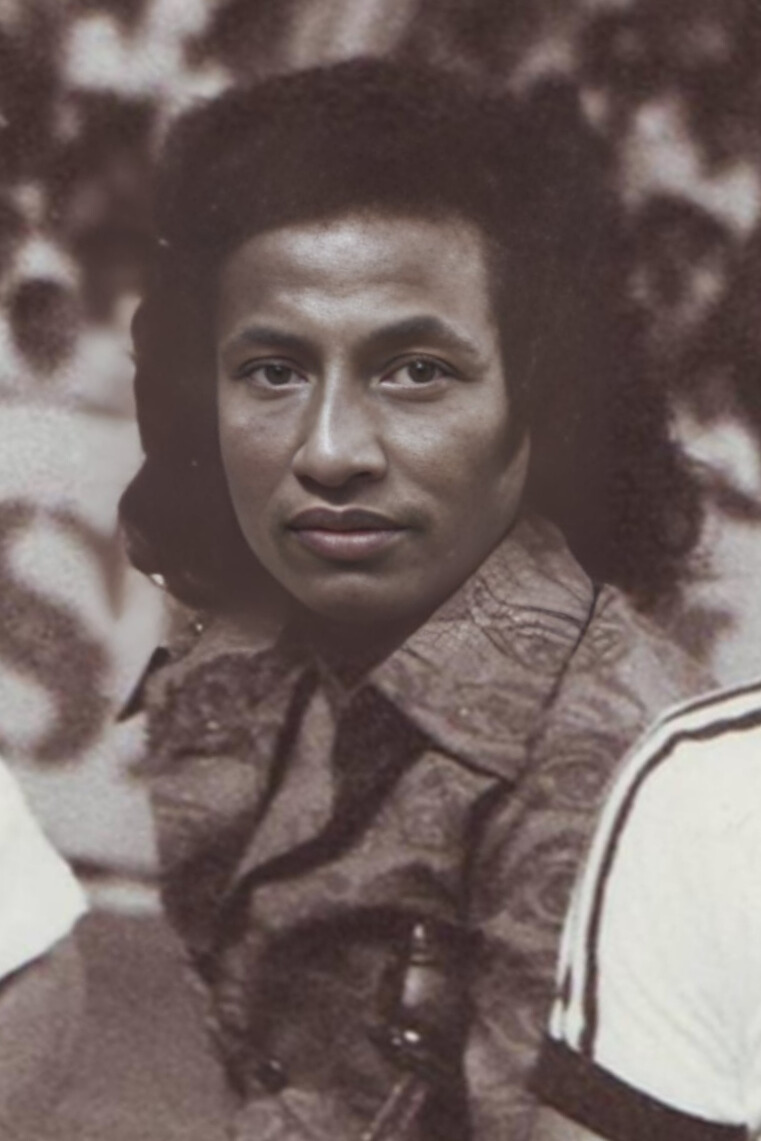
- Sihasale in 1976

Personal information
- Date of birth: 16 April 1944
- Place of birth: Ambon, Japanese occupation of the Dutch East Indies
- Date of death: 7 July 1983 (aged 39)
- Place of death: Jakarta, Indonesia
- Height: 1.69 m (5 ft 7 in)
- Position: Forward

Youth career
- 1958–1960: PSA Ambon

Senior career*
Years	Team	Apps	(Gls)
1965–1969	Persebaya Surabaya	22	(5)
1969–1970	Pardedetex Medan	15	(4)
1970–1975	Persebaya Surabaya	42	(9)

International career
1961–1963	Indonesia U19		
1966–1974	Indonesia	71	(24)

Managerial career
- 1980–1981: Indonesia (Assistant coach)
- 1982–1983: Yanita Utama
- * Club domestic league appearances and goals

Jacob Sihasale (16 April 1944 – 7 July 1983) was an Indonesian professional football player who played as a forward. A legendary Indonesian footballer who is in the eighth place as the all-time top goalscorers for the Indonesian national team with 23 goals and is in the fifth place as the all-time most appearances with 70 games.

== Club career ==
Sihasale started playing football around 1958–1960, was selected as a PSA Ambon player. In 1961 he moved to Surabaya and joined the famous association, Assyabaab Surabaya, until 1966. Before moving to Medan, he played for 2 years for the PSAD Kodam IX/Udayana association; then played for Pardedetex Medan. In 1970 he returned to Surabaya.

He succeeded in bringing Persebaya Surabaya to become runner up Perserikatan in 1971 and 1973. After losing to PSMS Medan and Persija Jakarta in the final respectively.

But unfortunately at the end of his career as a football player, he failed to bring Persebaya to the final round of the League after losing to Persija with a score of 2–0. Persija's goals at that time were scored by Iswadi Idris in the 68th minute and Risdianto in the 69th minute. But he also managed to score a goal in the match against PSBS Bangkinang which ended 1–1. He scored the opening goal in the 30th minute before Robby Binur equalized in the 73rd minute.

During his career as a footballer he has scored over 100 goals. After sustaining an injury to his leg in a friendly match between Persebaya and Ascot from Australia, at the end of 1975 in Surabaya, he retired from football.

== International career ==
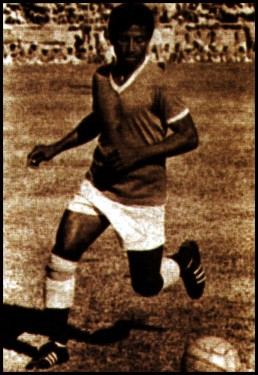
Sihasale playing for Indonesia national team

The peak of his achievements was reached between 1966 and 1974, when he represented the Indonesia national football team in various tournaments, including: 1968 King's Cup and 1969 King's Cup in Bangkok; 1968 Aga Khan Gold Cup in Pakistan; 1969 Merdeka Tournament in Kuala Lumpur.

In 1966, he was selected to be the Asian All Stars team together with Soetjipto Soentoro, Max Timisela, Iswadi Idris, and Abdul Kadir. They were the fastest quartet in Asia at that time.

He also brought Indonesia to win the 1972 Jakarta Anniversary Tournament in Jakarta when in the final Indonesia managed to defeat South Korea with a score of 5–2. The goals came when Indonesia beat Sri Lanka with a score of 8–0. He scored three goals in that match.

== Career statistics ==
=== International ===
Appearances and goals by national team and year
National team	Year	Apps	Goals
Indonesia	1966	2	1
Indonesia	1968	7	4
Indonesia	1969	8	5
Indonesia	1970	11	2
Indonesia	1971	14	3
Indonesia	1972	17	8
Indonesia	1973	10	1
Indonesia	1974	2	0
Total		71	24

Scores and results list Indonesia's goal tally first, score column indicates score after each Sihasale goal.

List of international goals scored by Jacob Sihasale
No.	Date	Venue	Cap	Opponent	Result	Competition
1	17 August 1968	Perak Stadium, Ipoh, Malaysia	2	South Korea	4–2	1968 Merdeka Tournament
2	21 August 1968	Merdeka Stadium, Kuala Lumpur, Malaysia	3	Burma	1–2	1968 Merdeka Tournament
3	29 November 1968	Suphachalasai Stadium, Bangkok, Thailand	7	Malaysia	6–1	1968 King's Cup
4	29 November 1968	Suphachalasai Stadium, Bangkok, Thailand	7	Malaysia	6–1	1968 King's Cup
5	3 November 1969	Merdeka Stadium, Kuala Lumpur, Malaysia	10	Malaysia	3–1	1969 Merdeka Tournament
6	7 November 1969	Merdeka Stadium, Kuala Lumpur, Malaysia	11	Singapore	9–2	1969 Merdeka Tournament
7	9 November 1969	Merdeka Stadium, Kuala Lumpur, Malaysia	12	Malaysia	3–2	1969 Merdeka Tournament
8	19 November 1969	Suphachalasai Stadium, Bangkok, Thailand	13	Singapore	2–3	1969 King's Cup
9	21 November 1969	Suphachalasai Stadium, Bangkok, Thailand	14	South Vietnam	6–0	1969 King's Cup
10	4 August 1970	Penang Island National Stadium, Penang, Malaysia	18	Hong Kong	3–1	1970 Merdeka Tournament
11	16 December 1970	Suphachalasai Stadium, Bangkok, Thailand	26	Japan	1–2	1970 King's Cup
12	13 May 1971	Dongdaemun Stadium, Seoul, South Korea	31	Malaysia	4–2	1971 President's Cup
13	11 August 1971	Merdeka Stadium, Kuala Lumpur, Malaysia	35	Philippines	3–1	1971 Merdeka Tournament
14	18 August 1971	Merdeka Stadium, Kuala Lumpur, Malaysia	38	Taiwan	1–0	1971 Merdeka Tournament
15	20 March 1972	Bogyoke Aung San Stadium, Rangoon, Burma	42	Thailand	4–0	1972 Olympic Games qualifiers
16	20 March 1972	Bogyoke Aung San Stadium, Rangoon, Burma	42	Thailand	4–0	1972 Olympic Games qualifiers
17	25 March 72	Bogyoke Aung San Stadium, Rangoon, Burma	43	India	4–2	1972 Olympic Games qualifiers
18	11 June 1972	Gelora Senayan Main Stadium, Jakarta, Indonesia	48	Sri Lanka	8–0	1972 Jakarta Anniversary Tournament
19	11 June 1972	Gelora Senayan Main Stadium, Jakarta, Indonesia	48	Sri Lanka	8–0	1972 Jakarta Anniversary Tournament
20	11 June 1972	Gelora Senayan Main Stadium, Jakarta, Indonesia	48	Sri Lanka	8–0	1972 Jakarta Anniversary Tournament
21	8 August 1972	National Stadium, SingaporeKallang, Singapore	53	Khmer Republic	5–0	1972 Singapore Festival
22	25 September 1972	Dongdaemun Stadium, Seoul, South Korea	56	Philippines	12–0	1972 President's Cup
23	14 June 1973	Gelora Senayan Main Stadium, Jakarta, Indonesia	65	Malaysia	2–0	1973 Jakarta Anniversary Tournament

== Honours ==
=== Player ===
PSMS Medan

- Perserikatan: 1969

Persebaya

- Perserikatan runner-up: 1969–71, 1971–74
- Surya Cup: 1975

Indonesia U19

- AFC Youth Championship: 1961

Indonesia

- King's Cup: 1968; runner-up: 1969
- Merdeka Tournament: 1969; runner-up: 1971
- Pesta Sukan Cup: 1972
- Jakarta Anniversary Tournament: 1972; runner-up: 1971, 1973, 1974, 1975

=== Manager ===
Yanita Utama

- Galatama: 1983–84
