= 1974 President's Cup Football Tournament =

1974 President's Cup
Tournament details
- Host country: South Korea
- Dates: 11–20 May
- Teams: 7

Final positions
- Champions: South Korea (2nd title)
- Runners-up: (Indonesia) PSMS Medan
- Third place: Burma
- Fourth place: Khmer Republic

Tournament statistics
- Matches played: 13
- Goals scored: 41 (3.15 per match)
- Top scorer(s): (South Korea) Park Lee-chun (6 goals)

The 1974 President's Cup Football Tournament (Korean: 제4회 박대통령컵 쟁탈 아시아축구대회) was the fourth competition of Korea Cup. The competition was held from 11 to 20 May 1974, and was won by South Korea for the second time, who defeated PSMS Medan, representative of Indonesia in the final.

== Group stage ==
=== Group A ===
Team	Pld	W	D	L	GF	GA	GD	Pts	Qualification
South Korea	3	2	0	1	7	1	+6	4	Qualification to semi-finals
Khmer Republic	3	1	2	0	3	2	+1	4	Qualification to semi-finals
Japan B	3	0	2	1	3	6	−3	2	
Malaysia B	3	0	2	1	3	7	−4	2	

11 May 1974

South Korea	3–0	Japan B
Park Lee-chun 41'; Cha Bum-kun 60', 87'	Report; Newscast

Dongdaemun Stadium, Seoul

11 May 1974

Malaysia B	1–1	Khmer Republic

Dongdaemun Stadium, Seoul

13 May 1974

South Korea	0–1	Khmer Republic
	Report	Doeur 9'

Dongdaemun Stadium, Seoul

13 May 1974

Japan B	2–2	Malaysia B
? 65'; ? 77'	Report	? 16'; ? 61'

Dongdaemun Stadium, Seoul

15 May 1974

South Korea	4–0	Malaysia B
Kim Jae-han 22'; Lee Hoe-taik 49'; Park Lee-chun 55', 79'	Report

Dongdaemun Stadium, Seoul

15 May 1974

Japan B	1–1	Khmer Republic
Usui 62'	Report	Doeur 61'

Dongdaemun Stadium, Seoul

=== Group B ===
Team	Pld	W	D	L	GF	GA	GD	Pts	Qualification
(Indonesia) PSMS Medan	2	1	1	0	2	1	+1	3	Qualification to semi-finals
Burma	2	1	0	1	3	3	0	2	Qualification to semi-finals
Thailand	2	0	1	1	1	2	−1	1	

12 May 1974

Burma	1–2	(Indonesia) PSMS Medan
Win Maung 77'	Report	Tumsila 46'; Kayamudin 50'

Dongdaemun Stadium, Seoul

14 May 1974

PSMS Medan (Indonesia)	0–0	Thailand

Dongdaemun Stadium, Seoul

16 May 1974

Burma	2–1	Thailand
Tin Win 4'; ? 74'	Report 1 Report 2	Niwatana 48' (pen.)

Dongdaemun Stadium, Seoul

== Knockout stage ==
=== Bracket ===
Semi-finals
18 May – Seoul
South Korea	3
Burma	0
18 May – Seoul
(Indonesia) PSMS Medan (p)	1 (3)
Khmer Republic	1 (2)

Final
20 May – Seoul
South Korea	7
(Indonesia) PSMS Medan	1
Third place play-off
20 May – Seoul
Burma	6
Khmer Republic	0

=== Semi-finals ===
18 May 1974

South Korea	3–0	Burma
Park Lee-chun 50'; Cha Bum-kun 71'; Kim Jae-han 74'	Report

Dongdaemun Stadium, Seoul
Attendance: 30,000

18 May 1974

PSMS Medan (Indonesia)	1–1 (a.e.t.)	Khmer Republic
Penalties
	3–2

Dongdaemun Stadium, Seoul

=== Third place play-off ===
20 May 1974

Burma	6–0	Khmer Republic

Dongdaemun Stadium, Seoul

=== Final ===
20 May 1974

South Korea	7–1	(Indonesia) PSMS Medan
Park Lee-chun 5', 27'; Ko Jae-wook 8'; Sukirman 32' (o.g.); Kim Jae-han 44', 74'; Cha Bum-kun 66'	Report; Newscast	Tumsila 16'

Dongdaemun Stadium, Seoul

== See also ==
- Korea Cup
- South Korea national football team results
