= Piet Dumortier =

Dutch footballer

Personal information
- Full name: Pieter Dumortier
- Date of birth: 9 November 1915
- Place of birth: Utrecht, Netherlands
- Date of death: 5 April 1945 (aged 29)
- Place of death: Utrecht, Netherlands
- Position: Forward

Senior career*
Years	Team	Apps	(Gls)
1930–1944	DOS		

International career
1938	Netherlands	1	(0)
- * Club domestic league appearances and goals

Piet Dumortier (9 November 1915 – 5 April 1945) was a Dutch footballer. He played in one match for the Netherlands national football team in 1938.

Nicknamed Rooie Piet (Red Pete), he played for the Utrecht club VV DOS between 1930 and 1944.

== Personal life ==
Dumortier married at Utrecht City Hall in 1944 Everdina Abrahamsen.

Dumortier became proprietor of a cigar shop in Utrecht, but he suffered from Goitre, an enlarged thyroid gland that can lead to problems with swallowing or breathing. He died during a bombing raid at the end of the Second World War, and shortly before his city was liberated from German occupation, when he was being hospitalised for diphtheria - during the raid the Germans allegedly turned off the electricity (by other accounts a power failure) which cut power to his iron lung. Teammates tried in vain to save his life by generating electricity with a bicycle dynamo. He is buried at the Tolsteeg Cemetery.
