= 1972 Jakarta Anniversary Tournament =

Tournament details
- Host country: Indonesia
- Dates: 5–20 June
- Teams: 10

Final positions
- Champions: Indonesia (1st title)
- Runners-up: South Korea B
- Third place: Khmer Republic
- Fourth place: Burma

Tournament statistics
- Matches played: 24
- Goals scored: 87 (3.63 per match)

The 1972 Jakarta Anniversary Tournament was an invitational association football tournament held from June 5 to 20 in Jakarta, Indonesia. Ten teams participated in that edition.

== Group stage ==
=== Group A ===
Team	Pld	W	D	L	GF	GA	GD	Pts
Indonesia	4	4	0	0	17	1	+16	8
Burma	4	2	1	1	12	6	+6	4 (Note: 1 point deducted?)
Malaysia	4	2	1	1	7	6	+1	4 (Note: 1 point deducted?)
Sri Lanka	4	1	0	3	5	16	−11	2
Laos	4	0	0	4	4	16	−12	0

Notes:
5 June 1972

Indonesia	1–0	Burma
Risdianto 65'

Senayan Stadium, Jakarta
Attendance: 40,000

7 June 1972

Malaysia	3–0	Sri Lanka

Senayan Stadium, Jakarta
7 June 1972

Indonesia	5–1	Laos
Iswadi 10', 25'; Abdul Kadir 23', 33'; Risdianto 30'		Anwar Udjang 3' (o.g.)

Senayan Stadium, Jakarta
Attendance: 26,000

9 June 1972

Malaysia	2–1	Laos
P. Avadyaru 14'; Mokhtar Dahari 88'	Report	Douangdy 58'

Senayan Stadium, Jakarta
Attendance: 15,000
9 June 1972

Burma	4–2	Sri Lanka
Maung Soe Myint 52'; Maung Myint Kyu 70'; Maung Sein Win Lay 75'; Maung Khin Maung Tint 84'	Report	Subhani Hassimdeen 28'; T.K.C Perera 40'

Senayan Stadium, Jakarta

11 June 1972

Burma	6–1	Laos
Maung Khin Lay 5'; Maung Khin Maung Tint 12'; Hla Tay 38'; Tansery 40' (o.g); Myint Kyu 52'; Ye Tun 80'		Dounnedy 32'

Senayan Stadium, Jakarta
11 June 1972

Indonesia	8–0	Sri Lanka
Jacob Sihasale; Abdul Kadir; Risdianto; Waskito

Senayan Stadium, Jakarta

13 June 1972

Laos	1–3	Sri Lanka

Senayan Stadium, Jakarta
13 June 1972

Indonesia	3–0	Malaysia
Abdul Kadir 30' (pen.), 77'; Risdianto 65'

Senayan Stadium, Jakarta
Attendance: 60,000

15 June 1972

Malaysia	2–2	Burma
Mohsain Alias 13'; Mokhtar Dahari 49'		Hla Tay 57'; Maung Tin 60'

Jakarta

=== Group B ===
Team	Pld	W	D	L	GF	GA	GD	Pts
South Korea B	4	3	1	0	9	3	+6	7
Khmer Republic	4	3	0	1	9	2	+7	6
Philippines	4	2	1	1	4	5	−1	5
Thailand	4	0	1	3	3	7	−4	1
Singapore	4	0	1	3	1	9	−8	1

6 June 1972

South Korea B	1–1	Philippines
Lee Joong-hwi

Jakarta
6 June 1972

Khmer Republic	3–0	Singapore
Doeur Sokhom 34', 55'; Tes Sean 69'

Jakarta

8 June 1972

Thailand	0–2	Khmer Republic
		Tes Sean 20'; Sea Chengeang 50'

Senayan Stadium, Jakarta
8 June 1972

Singapore	0–2	Philippines
		Romerico Serrano 1'; Lozano 41'

Senayan Stadium, Jakarta

10 June 1972

Singapore	1–1	Thailand
Moh. Ali 8'		Preecha Kitboon 88'

Senayan Stadium, Jakarta
10 June 1972

South Korea B	2–0	Khmer Republic
Moon Jae-sup; Jung Gyu-poong

Senayan Stadium, Jakarta

12 June 1972

South Korea B	3–0	Singapore
Jeong Gyu-poong 26'; Kim Hak-ki 61'; Kang Tae-hyun 82'

Jakarta
12 June 1972

Philippines	1–0	Thailand
Miguel Crame 88'

Jakarta

14 June 1972

Khmer Republic	4–0	Philippines
Tes Sean 29'; Doeur Sokhom 34' 60'; Doeur Miladord 39'

Senayan Stadium, Jakarta
14 June 1972

South Korea B	3–2	Thailand
Kim Ki-hyo 27'; Jung Gyu-poong 40'; Kim Hak-ki 82'		Preecha Kitboon 42'; Supakil 65'

Senayan Stadium, Jakarta

== Knockout stage ==
=== Semi-finals ===
17 June 1972

Indonesia	4–0	Khmer Republic
Ronny Pattinasarany 30'; Risdianto 42'; Kadir 70'; Iswadi Idris 82'

Senayan Stadium, Jakarta
Attendance: 50,000
17 June 1972

South Korea B	2–1	Burma
Lee Joong-hwi 12' (pen.); Lee Li-woo 85'		Ye Nyunt 25'

Senayan Stadium, Jakarta

=== Third place play-off ===
19 June 1972

Khmer Republic	3–0	Burma

Jakarta

=== Final ===
20 June 1972

Indonesia	5–2	South Korea B
Risdianto 14', 49'; Abdul Kadir 16', 51' (pen.); Iswadi Idris 43'		Lee Joong-hwi 60', 65' (pen.)

Jakarta
Attendance: 60,000
