= Abdul Kadir (footballer) =

Indonesian footballer (1948–2003)

- Kadir with Indonesia in 1971

Personal information
- Full name: Abdul Sulaiman Kadir
- Date of birth: 27 December 1948
- Place of birth: Denpasar, Bali, Indonesia
- Date of death: 4 April 2003 (aged 54)
- Place of death: Jakarta, Indonesia
- Height: 1.60 m (5 ft 3 in)
- Position: Winger

Youth career
- –1968: Assyabaab Surabaya

Senior career*
Years	Team	Apps	(Gls)
1968–1971	PSMS Medan	34	(24)
1971–1974	Persebaya Surabaya	66	(62)
1974–1975	Mackinnons	6	(0)
1975–1979	Persebaya Surabaya	42	(26)
1979–1980	Arseto	12	(6)
1980–1982	Perkesa 78	10	(4)
1982–1983	Yanita Utama	4	(4)
Total		174	(126)

International career
1966–1967	Indonesia U19	6	(6)
1967–1979	Indonesia	111	(70)

Managerial career
- 1983–1985: Yanita Utama
- 1985–1989: Krama Yudha Tiga Berlian
- 1989: Indonesia
- 1989–1991: Krama Yudha Tiga Berlian
Medal record
Men's football
Representing Indonesia
AFC U-20 Asian Cup
Runner-up	1967 Thailand	Team
- * Club domestic league appearances and goals

Abdul Sulaiman Kadir (Indonesian pronunciation: [ˈabdul kaˈdir]; 27 December 1948 – 4 April 2003) was an Indonesian professional football player and manager. He is regarded as the greatest Indonesian player ever.

Kadir played as a winger in the Indonesia national team from 1967 to 1979. Due to his agility in maneuvering the ball, Kadir got himself a nickname of "the Deer" (Indonesian: Kancil). He is the record holder in terms of both appearances and goal scoring for Indonesia. In December 2021, Kadir was confirmed by FIFA to have played 105 "A" international matches (111 as recognized by RSSSF) at the international level to become a member of the FIFA Century Club, the only Indonesian footballer to do so.

== Early life ==
Abdul Sulaiman Kadir was born on 27 December 1948 to an Indonesian couple in Denpasar, Bali. Since childhood, he has shown his love for football which made him join the Assyabaab Surabaya youth team as a teenager.

== Club career ==
=== PSMS Medan ===
After spending his youth career at Assyabaab Surabaya, Kadir joined Pardedetex Medan (PSMS Medan's internal team) in 1968. He joined the team along with other Indonesian international players including Soetjipto Soentoro, Iswadi Idris and Jacob Sihasale. He played there until 1971 and managed to win the Perserikatan in his last season with the club.

In total he has played 34 matches with both Pardedetex and PSMS Medan and scored 20 goals.

=== Persebaya Surabaya ===
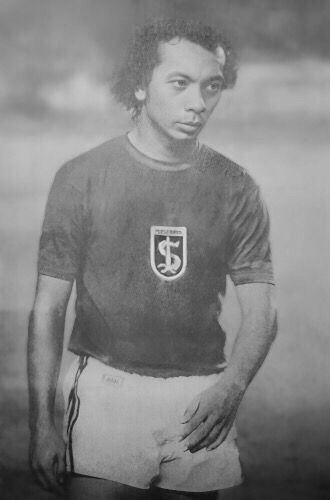
Kadir playing for Persebaya Surabaya during his first run for the club

In 1971, Kadir joined the other Perserikatan side Persebaya Surabaya. He spent most of his club career with the team, and managed to deliver the Perserikatan trophy in 1978, as well as three consecutive Surya Cups from 1975 to 1977.

It has been recorded that he has made 107 appearances and scored 85 goals for Persebaya Surabaya from 1971 to 1979, making him Persebaya Surabaya's all-time top scorer.

=== Arseto ===
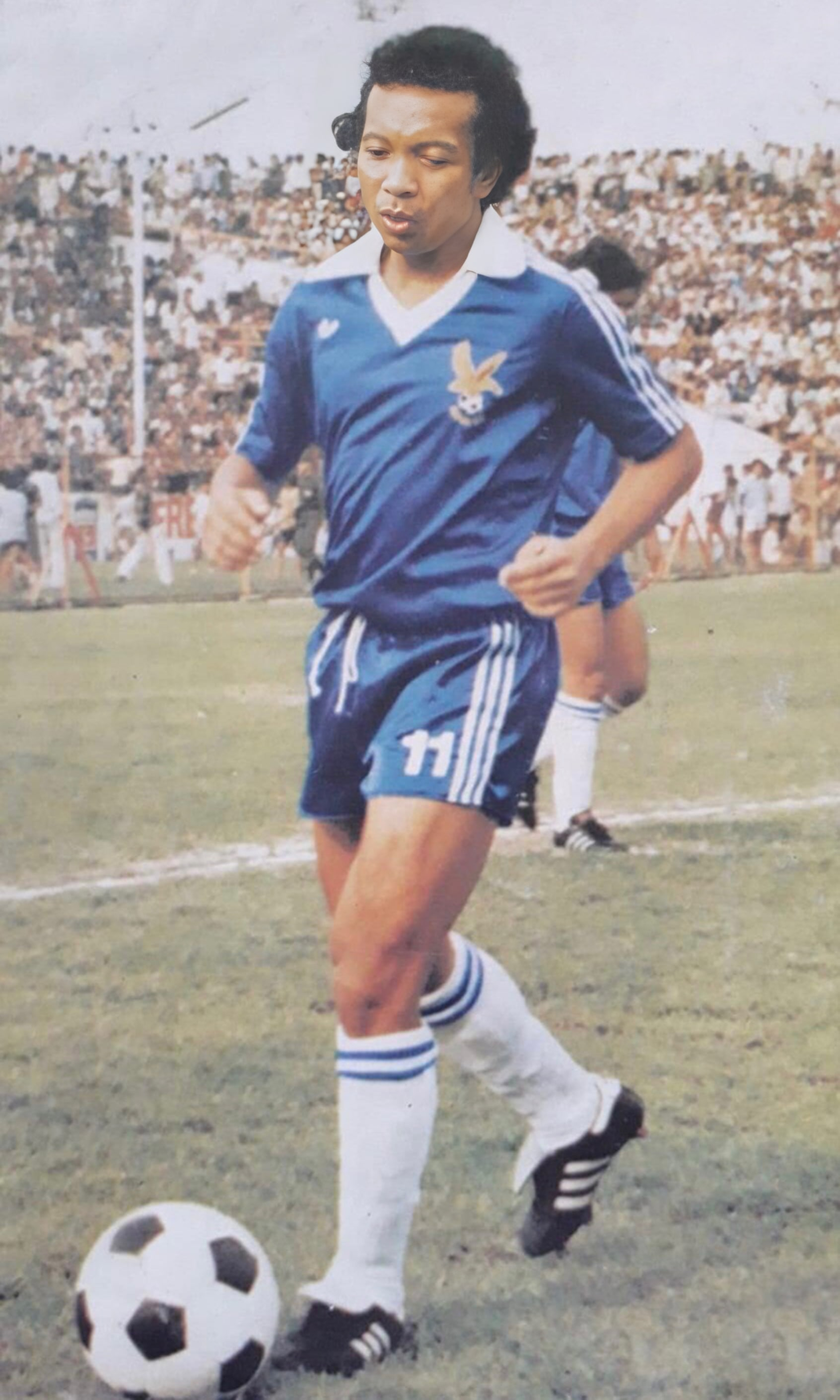
Abdul Kadir playing fot Arseto in 1979

In 1979, coinciding with the formation of Galatama; a new league competition in Indonesia (although Perserikatan still existed until 1994), Kadir joined one of the teams in the competition, Arseto.

With Arseto, Kadir made history as the first goal scorer in the Galatama competition. He achieved the record after he scored the opening goal against Pardedetex Medan in the opening match of the 1979–80 season. The match ended with Arseto's 3–2 victory with Kadir's hat trick.

=== Perkesa 78 ===
After a season with Arseto, Kadir moved to another Galatama club, Perkesa 78, which was located in Bogor (later moved to Sidoarjo). He only played there for one season, the 1980–82 Galatama and was only able to lead the club to finish in 7th position.

=== Yanita Utama ===
In 1982, Kadir moved to Jaka Utama (later renamed to Yanita Utama) to compete in the 1982–83 Galatama. He only played 3 matches and scored 3 goals at the club until he finally decided to retire as a player at the end of the season.

In total during his career with six different clubs, Abdul Kadir has recorded 166 appearances and scored 132 goals, both in the Perserikatan and Galatama competitions.

== International career ==
He began his international career as a youth player for Indonesia when he was selected to compete in the 1965 GANEFO in Pyongyang, North Korea at the age of 16. Kadir then went on to represent Indonesia national under-19 team, including when Garuda Muda finished second in the AFC Youth Championship in 1967.

In August 1967, Kadir received his first call-up to the senior Indonesia national team ahead of their 1967 Merdeka Tournament participation in Kuala Lumpur. He made his debut on 11 August against South Korea, also managed to score his debut goal (Indonesia's only goal in the match) in a 1–3 defeat to the opposing team.

Kadir (right) playing for Indonesia

After his international debut, Kadir continued to be trusted as a key player for Indonesia and has won many titles until his retirement. He played more than 100 international matches and score more than 70 international goals (including non 'A' match) for Indonesia national team as recognised by football statistic organisations RSSSF. He made his century of appearances for Indonesia against India in the Merdeka Tournament in Ipoh, Malaysia on 1 August 1974 – the match ended in a goalless draw. In total, he has made 111 appearances for the national team, making him the most capped player of all time for Indonesia. His 70 goals are also the most of all time for the Indonesia national team.

During his time representing Indonesia, Kadir won several trophies with the team, including the 1968 King's Cup in Thailand, the 1969 Merdeka Tournament in Malaysia, and the 1972 Pesta Sukan in Singapore. Indonesia national team also finished as runners up at the 1972 President's Cup. Together with Soetjipto Soentoro, Iswadi Idris, and Jacob Sihasale, he was elected by Asian Football Confederation as a part of the Asian All Stars in 1968.

== Style of play ==
Kadir spent most of his career as a left winger. He was praised for his speed and dribbling ability, as well as his ability to create chances and get into the penalty box. In his prime, he was often compared to the playing style of top Brazilian player, Pelé. He was also nicknamed "The Deer" (Indonesian: Si Kancil) due to his agility in maneuvering the ball. Despite only 1.60 m (5 ft 3 in) tall, it is not a hindrance, but rather an advantage on the field. His body posture supports his agility in running and controlling the ball, making it difficult for opponents to catch him.

== Managerial career ==
=== Yanita Utama ===
Kadir started his managerial career in 1983 when he coached Yanita Utama, a Galatama team from Bogor, West Java. He replaced Jacob Sihasale who died suddenly on 7 July. In 1984, he led the team to won their second Galatama trophy.

Despite the club's glory, Yanita Utama were collapsed due to a financial crisis and was bought by an Indonesian businessman and former PSSI leader, Sjarnoebi Said in 1985. The club then renamed to Krama Yudha Tiga Berlian (KTB) and was relocated in Palembang, South Sumatra. KTB were also brought almost all Yanita Utama's players and staffs, including Kadir.

=== Krama Yudha Tiga Berlian ===
After Yanita Utama was folded, Kadir became part of the team that moved to Krama Yudha Tiga Berlian (KTB). In 1985, He successfully led KTB to its first trophy by winning the Galatama trophy and made the team qualify for the Asian Club Championship (predecessor of the AFC Champions League Elite) the following year. In the 1986–87 season, he once again led KTB to win the Galatama and also won the club's first cup trophy (Piala Liga). In the next two seasons from 1988 to 1989, he again led the team to win two consecutive cup trophies.

=== Indonesia ===
In 1989, Kadir coached the Indonesia national team alongside his former teammates in the national team, Muhammad Basri and Iswadi Idris. Together they were known as the "Bas-Is-Ka" trio. Indonesia managed to win a bronze medal after defeating Thailand through a penalty shootout in the bronze medal match of the 1989 SEA Games in Kuala Lumpur, Malaysia.

Kadir's career with the trio had to stop in the same year after Indonesia was only able to survive in the first round of the 1990 World Cup qualifiers. The national team at that time finished in third place in Group 6 with only one win from six total matches.

=== Return to Krama Yudha Tiga Berlian ===
After no longer serving as Indonesia's coach, Kadir returned to coach Krama Yudha Tiga Berlian in 1989 until the club dissolved in 1991.

== Personal life ==
In June 1972, Kadir had the opportunity to accompany Pelé (who at that time came to Indonesia with Santos) who was invited by the national television network TVRI to be a guest star and then demonstrated their skills in controlling the ball.

Kadir was a Muslim. He was married to Lisa Agustina Sumarweni and lived on Pandudewata Street in Bekasi, West Java since 1989. Together they had four children, including their eldest son Aryo Jasa Pradila (who died from typhus in 2005) and their youngest son Muhammad Ali Rizky.

== Later years and death ==
In his 50s, Kadir suffered from kidney failure and had to undergo hemodialysis twice a week at Dr. Cipto Mangunkusumo Hospital in Salemba, Jakarta. After several months of medical treatment, he died on 4 April 2003 in Jakarta, leaving behind a wife, four children, and a grandchild. He was then buried in Karet Bivak Public Cemetery, South Jakarta. His fellow footballers when he was still a player and coach, including Patar Tambunan, Risdianto, Anjas Asmara, Sutan Harhara, Judo Hadianto also attended his funeral. The President of the Republic of Indonesia at that time, Megawati Sukarnoputri and her husband Taufiq Kiemas, were also present by laying condolence wreaths at his grave.

== Career statistics ==
=== International ===
Appearances and goals by national team and year
National team	Year	Apps	Goals
Indonesia	1967	6	2
Indonesia	1968	9	9
Indonesia	1969	8	7
Indonesia	1970	16	10
Indonesia	1971	24	10
Indonesia	1972	19	20
Indonesia	1973	9	2
Indonesia	1974	9	7
Indonesia	1978	8	3
Indonesia	1979	3	0
Total		111	70

== Honours ==
=== Player ===
PSMS Medan

- Perserikatan: 1967–69

Persebaya

- Perserikatan: 1975–78; runner-up: 1971–74
- Surya Cup: 1975, 1976, 1977

Indonesia U19

- AFC Youth Championship runner-up: 1967

Indonesia

- King's Cup: 1968; runner-up: 1969
- Pestabola Merdeka: 1969; runner-up: 1971
- Korea Cup runner-up: 1972
- Pesta Sukan Cup: 1972
- Jakarta Anniversary Tournament: 1972; runner-up: 1971, 1973, 1974, 1978

Individual

- FIFA Century Club
- Korea Cup top scorer: 1972

Records

- Indonesia national team all-time top scorer: 70 goals
- Most capped Indonesia international: 111 caps
- Youngest player to reach 100 caps for Indonesia: 25 years 217 days (v India, 1 August 1974)
- All-time top goalscorer in the Nusantara derby: 16 goals

=== Manager ===
Yanita Utama

- Galatama: 1984

Krama Yudha Tiga Berlian

- Galatama: 1985, 1986–87; runner-up: 1990
- Piala Liga: 1987, 1988, 1989
- Asian Club Championship third place: 1985–86

Indonesia

- SEA Games Bronze medal: 1989

== See also ==
- List of top international men's football goalscorers by country
- List of men's footballers with 100 or more international caps
- List of men's footballers with 50 or more international goals
