= Som Saran =

Cambodian football manager and former player

Personal information
- Birth name: Tes Sean
- Date of birth: 1951 (age 74–75)
- Place of birth: Kampong Cham, Cambodia

Senior career*
Years	Team	Apps	(Gls)
–1975	Phnom Penh		
1975–1980	Tây Ninh		

International career
1968–1984	Cambodia		

Managerial career
- 2003–2005: Cambodia
- * Club domestic league appearances and goals

Som Saran (Khmer: សោមសារ៉ន; born 1951), formerly known as Tes Sean or Nguyễn Tấn Sinh, is a former footballer and manager from Cambodia.

Since 2005, he has been the deputy director of the Veterans' Pensions Department at the Ministry of Social Affairs.

== Early life ==
Raised in the town of Kampong Cham, Som started football at age 16 and moved to the capital, Phnom Penh.

== Playing career ==
He captained the Cambodia national team in 1972, leading them to a fourth-place finish in the 1972 AFC Asian Cup.

After the Khmer Rouge took power in 1975, Som and his brother Tấn Minh were forced to flee to Vietnam. There, they both played for Tây Ninh. Some of former his teammates in Cambodia were forced into agricultural work. When he returned to Cambodia in the 1990s, only six players were alive from the team that last played before the Khmer Rouge came.

== Coaching career ==
Som was in charge of the Cambodia national team until 2005, he led his team to the 2004 Tiger Cup and played against Vietnam. His team mostly composed of 20 to 21 year old players.

While managing Cambodia, Som insinuated that his players were involved in corruption. An investigation was conducted, but the Football Federation of Cambodia denied the accusation.
