= Iswadi Idris =

Indonesian footballer (1948–2008)

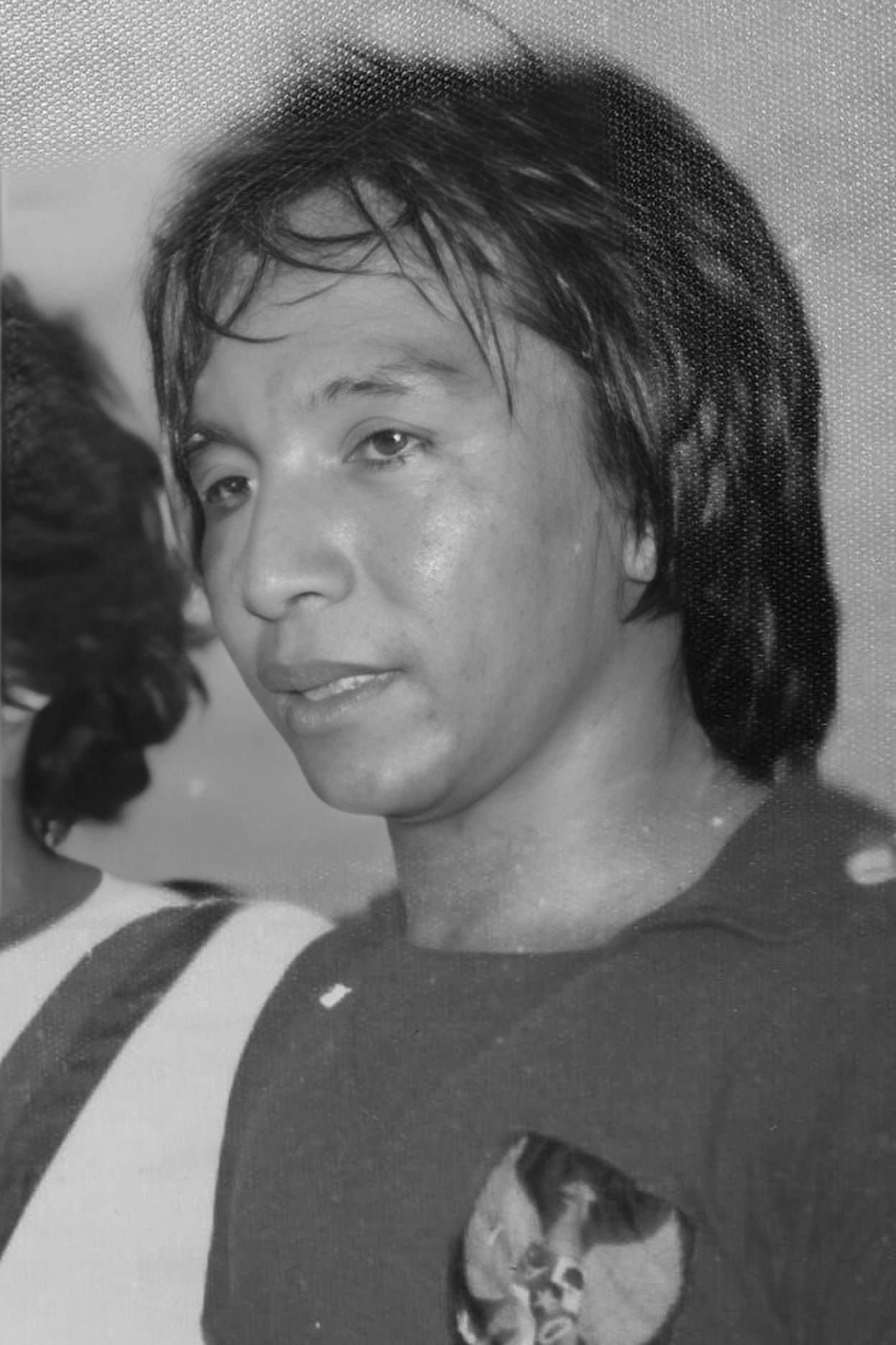
- Idris playing for Indonesia in 1979

Personal information
- Full name: Iswadi Idris
- Date of birth: 18 March 1948
- Place of birth: Banda Aceh, Aceh, Indonesia
- Date of death: 11 July 2008 (aged 60)
- Place of death: Jakarta, Indonesia
- Height: 1.65 m (5 ft 5 in)
- Positions: Attacking midfielder; right winger; right-back

Youth career
- 1957–1961: MBFA
- 1961–1966: IM Jakarta

Senior career*
Years	Team	Apps	(Gls)
1966–1968	Persija	12	(3)
1968–1970	→ PSMS Medan (loan)	22	(11)
1970–1974	Persija	54	(26)
1974–1975	→ Western Suburbs (loan)		
1975–1978	Persija	75	(31)
1978–1981	PSPS Pekanbaru		

International career
1968–1980	Indonesia	97	(55)

Managerial career
- 1982—1983: Indonesia
- 1983–1986: Perkesa 78
- 1989: Indonesia
- 1994–1996: Mataram Indocement
Medal record
Men's football
Representing Indonesia
Southeast Asian Games
Silver medal – second place	1979 Jakarta	Team
- * Club domestic league appearances and goals

Iswadi Idris (18 March 1948 – 11 July 2008) was an Indonesian football player and coach. He was nicknamed "Boncel" because of his small, 1.65 m (5 ft 5 in) stature. He was captain of the Indonesia national football team from 1970 to 1980. He is the second all-time top scorer and has the second highest record of appearances for the Indonesia national team.

== International career ==
Idris's first international appearance with Indonesia was in the 1968 Merdeka Tournament. He was the captain of the Indonesia national football team in 1970. Together with Soetjipto Soentoro, Abdul Kadir and Jacob Sihasale, he was part of what was called "Asia's fastest quartet". He played in several positions, including right back and sweeper but mostly played in attacking positions alongside Abdul Kadir.

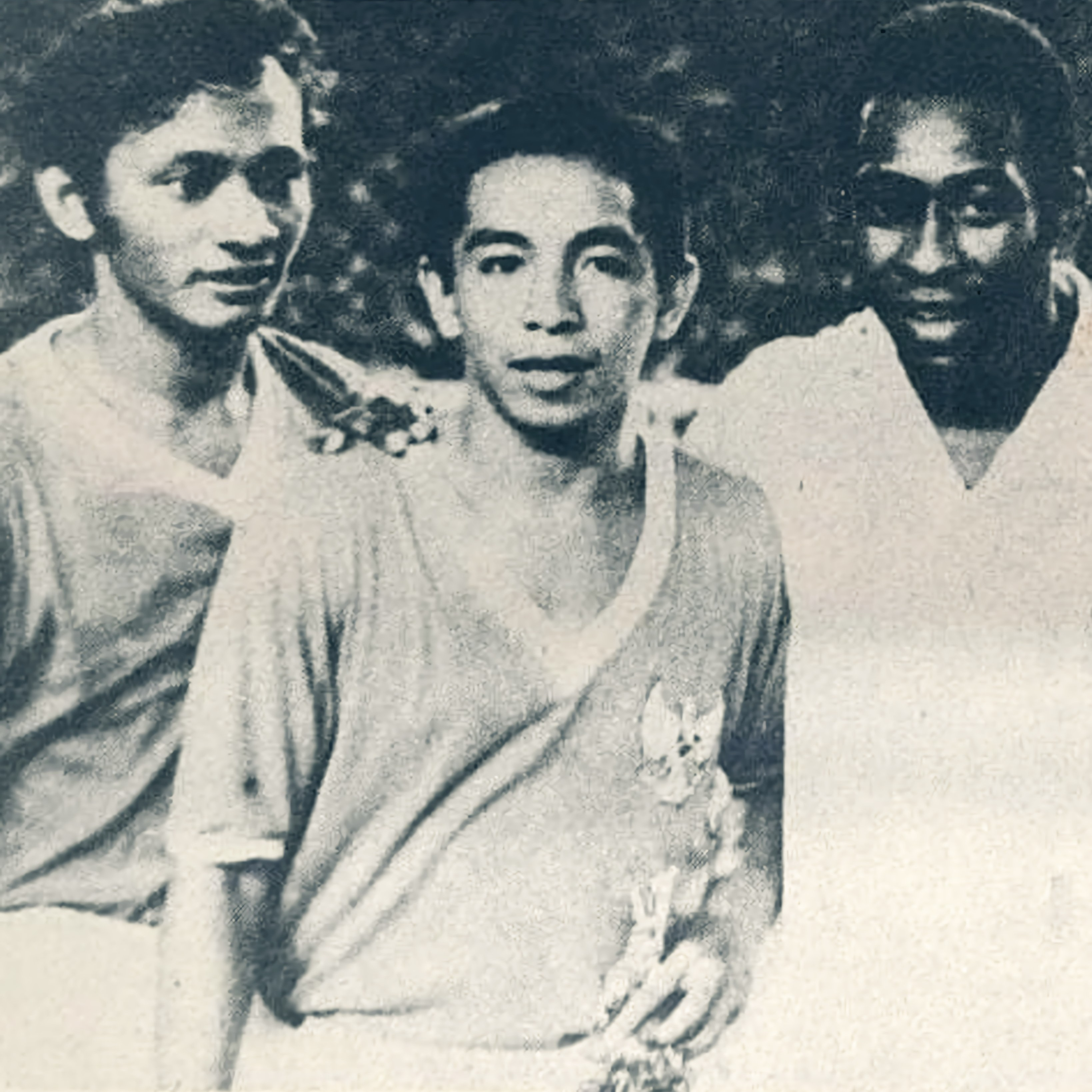
Idris (center) with Risdianto (left) and Pelé (right) after a friendly match between Indonesia and Santos in 1972

With Indonesia, he won the 1968 Kings Cup, 1969 Merdeka Tournament, 1972 Jakarta Anniversary Cup, and 1972 Pesta Sukan. He last played for in the 1980 Olympic Games qualification. Overall he have played 97 times for Indonesia scoring 55 international goals.

He later coached the national team, and became an administrator of the PSSI.

== Managerial career ==
=== Indonesia ===
In 1989, Idris coached the Indonesia national team alongside his former teammates in the national team, Muhammad Basri and Abdul Kadir. Together they were known as the "Bas-Is-Ka" trio. Indonesia managed to win a bronze medal after defeating Thailand through a penalty shootout in the bronze medal match of the 1989 SEA Games in Kuala Lumpur, Malaysia.

Idris' career with the trio had to stop in the same year after Indonesia was only able to survive in the first round of the 1990 World Cup qualifiers. The national team at that time finished in third place in Group 6 with only one win from six total matches.

== Personal life ==
Idris was a muslim. He was met his wife, Rahmah Astuti in the early 1980s and was married in 1982. They had 2 daughters and 1 son. Their first child, Kusuma Ayu Kinanti, was born in February 1983.

In 1994, after he finished his career as a football player and manager, Idris entered the ranks of the Football Association of Indonesia (PSSI) management. A number of positions were entrusted to him starting from Director of PSSI Competitions and Tournaments, member of the PSSI Disciplinary Commission to Director of PSSI Engineering. His last position there was as Technical Manager of the National Team Agency and the monitoring team with his former teammates Risdianto and Ronny Pattinasarany.

== Later years and death ==
Idris, his wife and their 3 children lived in Sleman, Yogyakarta. In his old age, he suffered a stroke that drastically reduced his body functions. He died on 11 July 2008 in Jakarta after being treated for three days at MMC Hospital and Jakarta Medical Centrer. Before being rushed to the hospital, he had fallen at his house which made him unconscious. He was buried at Karet Bivak Cemetery, Jakarta.

== Career statistics ==
=== International ===
Appearances and goals by national team and year
National team	Year	Apps	Goals
Indonesia	1968	9	8
Indonesia	1969	8	7
Indonesia	1970	16	8
Indonesia	1971	11	10
Indonesia	1972	19	10
Indonesia	1973	10	3
Indonesia	1976	5	2
Indonesia	1977	6	4
Indonesia	1979	8	3
Indonesia	1980	5	0
Total		97	55

== Honours ==
=== Player ===
PSMS Medan

- Perserikatan (1): 1969

Persija Jakarta

- Perserikatan (2): 1973, 1975
- Quoc Khanh Cup (1): 1973

Indonesia

- King's Cup (1): 1968; runner-up: 1969
- Merdeka Tournament (1): 1969
- Jakarta Anniversary Tournament (1): 1972; runner-up: 1971, 1973, 1974, 1975, 1978
- Pesta Sukan Cup: 1972
- SEA Games silver Medal: 1979
- President's Cup runner-up: 1972

Individual

- IFFHS Men’s All Time Indonesia Dream Team: 2022
- Copa Indonesia All Time Indonesia Legendary Players: 2008

Records

- Indonesia national team 2nd all-time top scorer: 55 goals
- 2nd-Most capped Indonesia international: 97 caps
- Scored the most goals for Indonesia in a single match: 5 goals (vs South Vietnam, 2 May 1971)

=== Manager ===
Indonesia

- SEA Games Bronze medal: 1989

== See also ==
- List of men's footballers with 50 or more international goals

Preceded by Soetjipto Soentoro; Anwar Udjang	Indonesian Captain; 1970–1971; 1974–1980	Succeeded by Anwar Udjang; Ronny Pattinasarany
