= Risdianto =

Indonesian footballer

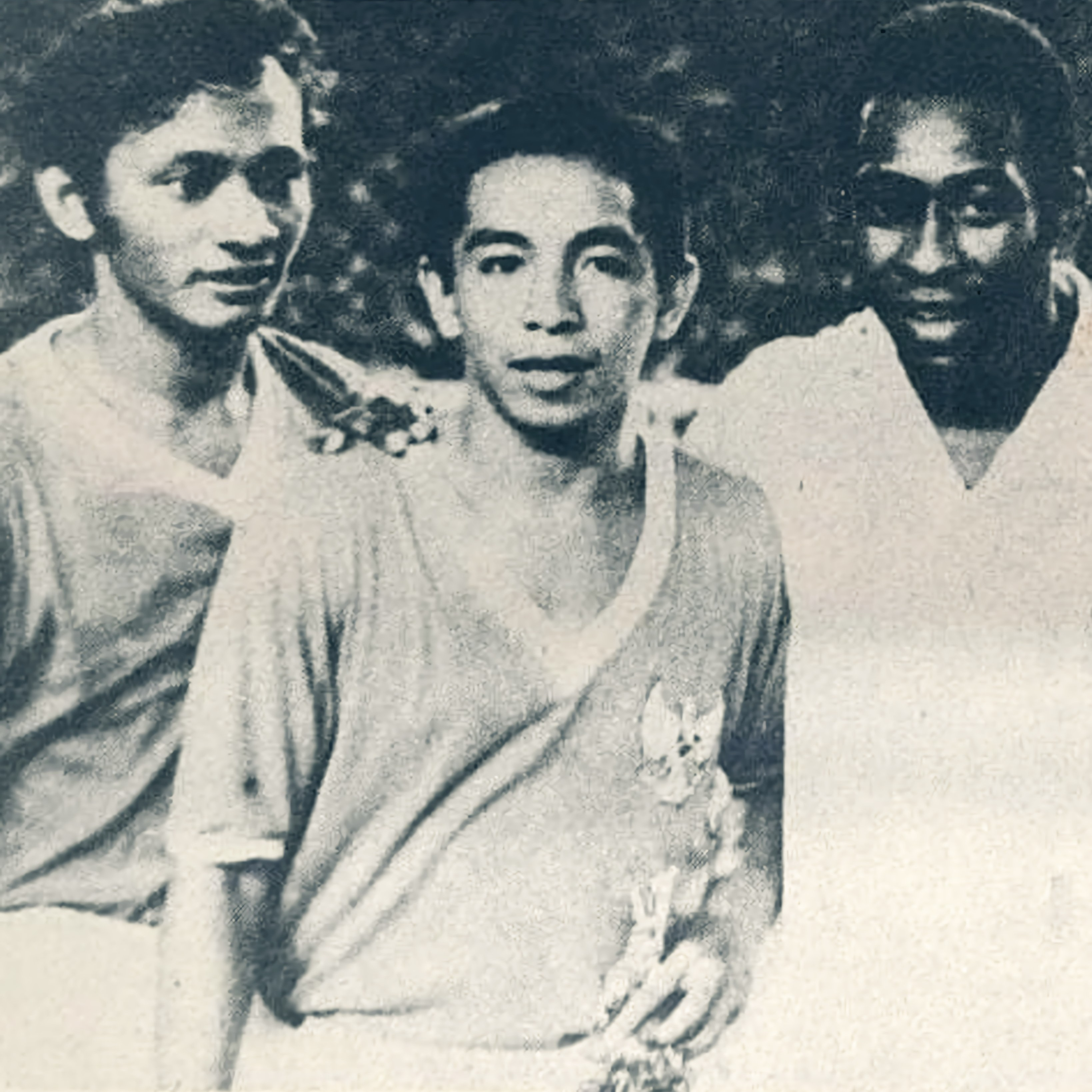
- Risdianto (left) with Iswadi Idris and Pelé in 1972

Personal information
- Full name: Risdianto
- Date of birth: 3 January 1950 (age 76)
- Place of birth: Pasuruan, East Java, Indonesia
- Position: Striker

Youth career
- 1964–1969: Persekap Pasuruan
- 1969–1970: Pardedetex Medan

Senior career*
Years	Team	Apps	(Gls)
1971	UMS 1905		
1971–1974	Persija Jakarta	34	(17)
1974–1975	Mackinnons		
1975–1978	Persija Jakarta	50	(13)
1978–1983	Warna Agung	54	(39)

International career
1971–1981	Indonesia	59	(27)
Medal record
Men's football
Representing Indonesia
Southeast Asian Games
Bronze medal – third place	1981 Manila	Team
Silver medal – second place	1979 Jakarta	Team
- * Club domestic league appearances and goals

Risdianto (born 3 January 1950) is an Indonesian former professional footballer who played as a striker. A legendary Indonesian footballer who is in seventh place as the all-time top goalscorers for the Indonesia national team with 25 goals in 56 games.

== Early life ==
Risdianto is the second child of seven siblings. The son of a sports teacher, Soekirno. At the age of 14, he has strengthened Persekap Pasuruan and participated in the National Sports Week East Java football team in 1969.

== Career ==
In 1971, he was called up to the national team squad until 1981. For a decade, Risdianto has represented Indonesia in a number of tournaments and championships, including the 1981 SEA Games, which won a bronze medal along with Iswadi Idris, Abdul Kadir, and Hartono. He started his first professional club by joining UMS 1905, which was trained by Endang Witarsa. From there he moved to Persija Jakarta. He spent much of his club career with Warna Agung from 1978 to 1983.

Risdianto was the first Indonesian player to be signed by MacKinnon Mackenzie, a Hong Kong top-division team for the 1974–1975 season. He is the second Indonesian footballer to be courted by a foreign club, after Iswadi Idris. He left Hong Kong to join the 1976 Pre-Olympic national team, at which time the national team's move was stopped by North Korea via a penalty shootout.

== Career statistics ==
=== International ===
Appearances and goals by national team and year
National team	Year	Apps	Goals
Indonesia	1971	2	0
Indonesia	1972	15	11
Indonesia	1973	1	0
Indonesia	1974	6	0
Indonesia	1975	11	9
Indonesia	1976	5	2
Indonesia	1977	6	1
Indonesia	1978	3	1
Indonesia	1979	5	1
Indonesia	1981	5	2
Total		59	27

Scores and results list Indonesia's goal tally first, score column indicates score after each Risdianto goal.

List of international goals scored by Risdianto
No.	Date	Venue	Cap	Opponent	Result	Competition
1	5 June 1972	Gelora Senayan Stadium, Jakarta, Indonesia	3	Burma	1–0	1972 Jakarta Anniversary Tournament
2	7 June 1972	Gelora Senayan Stadium, Jakarta, Indonesia	4	Laos	5–1	1972 Jakarta Anniversary Tournament
3	11 June 1972	Gelora Senayan Stadium, Jakarta, Indonesia	5	Sri Lanka	8–0	1972 Jakarta Anniversary Tournament
4	11 June 1972	Gelora Senayan Stadium, Jakarta, Indonesia	5	Sri Lanka	8–0	1972 Jakarta Anniversary Tournament
5	13 June 1972	Gelora Senayan Stadium, Jakarta, Indonesia		Malaysia	3–0	1972 Jakarta Anniversary Tournament
6	17 June 1972	Gelora Senayan Stadium, Jakarta, Indonesia	6	Khmer Republic	4–0	1972 Jakarta Anniversary Tournament
7	2 August 1972	Jalan Besar Stadium, Kallang, Singapore	8	Philippines	3–0	1972 Pesta Sukan Cup
8	2 August 1972	Jalan Besar Stadium, Kallang, Singapore	8	Philippines	3–0	1972 Pesta Sukan Cup
9	6 August 1972	Jalan Besar Stadium, Kallang, Singapore	9	Japan	1–0	1972 Pesta Sukan Cup
10	8 August 1972	Jalan Besar Stadium, Kallang, Singapore	10	Khmer Republic	5–0	1972 Pesta Sukan Cup
11	30 September 1972	Dongdaemun Stadium, Seoul, South Korea	15	Burma	1–3	1972 President's Cup
12	12 June 1975	Gelora Senayan Stadium, Jakarta, Indonesia	25	Thailand	5–0	1975 Jakarta Anniversary Tournament
13	12 June 1975	Gelora Senayan Stadium, Jakarta, Indonesia	25	Thailand	5–0	1975 Jakarta Anniversary Tournament
14	14 June 1975	Gelora Senayan Stadium, Jakarta, Indonesia	26	Malaysia	3–1	1975 Jakarta Anniversary Tournament
15	14 June 1975	Gelora Senayan Stadium, Jakarta, Indonesia	26	Malaysia	3–1	1975 Jakarta Anniversary Tournament
16	18 June 1975	Gelora Senayan Stadium, Jakarta, Indonesia	28	South Korea	3–2	1975 Jakarta Anniversary Tournament
17	18 June 1975	Gelora Senayan Stadium, Jakarta, Indonesia	28	South Korea	3–2	1975 Jakarta Anniversary Tournament
18	3 August 1975	Merdeka Stadium. Kuala Lumpur, Malaysia	31	Hong Kong	3–2	1975 Merdeka Tournament
19	3 August 1975	Merdeka Stadium. Kuala Lumpur, Malaysia	31	Hong Kong	3–2	1975 Merdeka Tournament
20	9 August 1975	Merdeka Stadium. Kuala Lumpur, Malaysia	33	Thailand	2–1	1975 Merdeka Tournament
21	17 February 1976	Gelora Senayan Stadium, Jakarta, Indonesia	37	Papua New Guinea	8–2	1976 Summer Olympics qualification
22	24 February 1976	Gelora Senayan Stadium, Jakarta, Indonesia	39	Malaysia	2–1	1976 Summer Olympics qualification
23	7 March 1977	National Stadium, Kallang, Singapore	43	Thailand	2–3	1978 FIFA World Cup qualification
24	22 June 1978	Gelora Senayan Stadium, Jakarta, Indonesia	49	Singapore	2–2	1978 Jakarta Anniversary Tournament
25	18 September 1979	Gelora Senayan Stadium, Jakarta, Indonesia	53	Burma	2–1	1979 Sea Games
26	16 August 1981	Gelora Senayan Stadium, Jakarta, Indonesia	56	Fiji	3–3	1982 FIFA World Cup qualification
27	30 August 1981	Gelora Bung Tomo Stadium, Surabaya, Indonesia	57	Australia	1–0	1982 FIFA World Cup qualification

== Honours ==
Persija Jakarta

- Perserikatan: 1973, 1975
- Marah Halim Cup: 1977

Warna Agung

- Galatama: 1979–80

Indonesia

- Pesta Sukan Cup: 1972
- Jakarta Anniversary Tournament: 1972; runner-up: 1971, 1973, 1974, 1975, 1978
- SEA Games silver medal: 1979; bronze medal: 1981
