= Jakarta Anniversary Tournament =

International football tournament hosted in Indonesia

The Jakarta Anniversary Tournament was a football tournament hosted by Indonesia. The tournament was established in 1970 to commemorate the establishment of Jakarta Government.

== Results ==
Year	Winners	Runners-up	Score (final)	Notes
1970	Malaysia	South Korea B	2–0	
1971	(Myanmar) Burma	Indonesia	1–0	
1972	Indonesia	South Korea B	5–2	
1973	Burma	Indonesia	—	Tournament in group stage
1974	Burma	Indonesia	—	Tournament in group stage
1975	Burma	Malaysia	2–0	
1976	South Korea B	Burma	—	Tournament in group stage
1977	Not held			
1978	South Korea B	Indonesia	3–1	
1979	Not held			
1980	Not held			
1981	South Korea; Bulgaria XI	—	2–2 (a.e.t.)	Trophy shared
