= South Vietnam national football team results =

National football team results

This article provides details of international football games played by the South Vietnam national football team (1955–1975), as well as early matches played by its predecessor, the State of Vietnam (1949–1955).

== Results ==
Keynotes
Win
Draw
Defeat

=== 1940s ===
==== 1949 ====
16 January Friendly	Vietnam	3–3	South Korea	Saigon, French Cochinchina
				Stadium: Stade du Jardin de la Ville

29 January Friendly	Hong Kong	3–1	Vietnam	Mong Kok, British Hong Kong

5 June Coupe du Président Tran Van Huu	Vietnam	2–0	Thailand	Saigon, French Cochinchina
				Stadium: Tao Đàn Stadium

=== 1950s ===
==== 1952 ====
11 May Coupe du Président Tran Van Huu	Vietnam	7–0	Cambodia	Saigon, State of Vietnam
		Report

29 June Friendly	Cambodia	1–4	Vietnam	Phnom Penh, Cambodia
		Report		Stadium: Charles Lambert Stadium

==== 1954 ====
11 May Friendly	Vietnam	4–1	Laos	Hanoi, State of Vietnam
		Report		Stadium: Cột Cờ Stadium

1 May 1954 Asian Games	Republic of China	3–2	Vietnam	Manila, Philippines
	Lee Tai-fai 17'; Chu Wing-keung 37' (pen.); Yiu Cheuk-yin 50'		Nguyễn Văn Tư 41'; Trần Văn Ứng 65'	Stadium: Rizal Memorial Stadium

3 May 1954 Asian Games	Philippines	2–3	Vietnam	Manila, Philippines
	Pacheco 51'; Razon 63'		Khe On 17'; Mi 31'; Quoc 79'	Stadium: Rizal Memorial Stadium

==== 1955 ====
November Friendly	Cambodia	0–2	South Vietnam	Phnom Penh, Cambodia
		Report

==== 1956 ====
April Friendly	South Vietnam	2–1	Thailand	Saigon, South Vietnam
				Stadium: Stade du Jardin de la Ville

April Friendly	South Vietnam	3–1	Thailand	Saigon, South Vietnam
				Stadium: Stade du Jardin de la Ville

3 May 1956 AFC Asian Cup qualification	South Vietnam	4–0	Malaya	Saigon, South Vietnam
	Đỗ Quang Thách 17', 57'; Lê Hữu Đức 30'; Nguyễn Văn Tư 65'			Stadium: Stade du Jardin de la Ville; Attendance: 20,000; Referee: Eng Ly Bean (Cambodia)

24 May 1956 AFC Asian Cup qualification	Malaya	3–3 (3–7 agg.)	South Vietnam	Kuala Lumpur, British Malaya
	Ghani 55', 80'; Pang Siang Hock 83'	Report	Nguyễn Văn Tư 24'; Trần Văn Nhung 74', 88'	Stadium: Princes Road Stadium; Attendance: 7,500; Referee: Greg de Silva (Malaya)

28 May Friendly	Singapore	2–1	South Vietnam	British Singapore

3 June 1956 Summer Olympics qualification	South Vietnam	5–2	Cambodia	Saigon, South Vietnam
				Stadium: Stade du Jardin de la Ville

10 June 1956 Summer Olympics qualification	Cambodia	3–4 (5–9 agg.)	South Vietnam	Phnom Penh, Cambodia

9 September 1956 AFC Asian Cup	South Vietnam	2–2	Hong Kong	Hong Kong Island, British Hong Kong
19:00 UTC+8	Trần Văn Nhung 30'; Lê Hữu Đức 64'		Chu Wing Wah 59' (pen.); Lau Chi Lam 79'	Stadium: Government Stadium; Attendance: 20,000

12 September 1956 AFC Asian Cup	Israel	2–1	South Vietnam	Hong Kong Island, British Hong Kong
19:00 UTC+8	Stelmach 14', 27'		Trần Văn Nhung 58'	Stadium: Government Stadium; Attendance: 10,000

15 September 1956 AFC Asian Cup	South Korea	5–3	South Vietnam	Hong Kong Island, British Hong Kong
19:00 UTC+8	Sung Nak-woon 5'; Woo Sang-kwon 41' (pen.), 58'; Choi Chung-min 57', 66'		Trải Văn Đào 20'; Lê Hữu Đức 51', 63'	Stadium: Government Stadium; Attendance: 13,000

==== 1957 ====
April Friendly	Cambodia	3–3	South Vietnam	Phnom Penh, Cambodia
		Report

April Friendly	Cambodia	2–3	South Vietnam	Phnom Penh, Cambodia
		Report

31 August 1957 Merdeka Tournament	South Vietnam	5–5 (a.e.t.)	Singapore	Kuala Lumpur, Malaysia
--:-- UTC+8	Lê Hữu Đức 5', 8', 31', 92'; Lê Văn Hồ 29'		Corthine 13', 17'; Hatch 57', 61'; Koh 95'	Stadium: Merdeka Stadium

1 September 1957 Merdeka Tournament	South Vietnam	2–1	Singapore	Kuala Lumpur, Malaysia
--:-- UTC+8	Nguyễn Văn Tư 48'; Trần Văn Đôn 51'		Corthine 85'	Stadium: Merdeka Stadium

3 September 1957 Merdeka Tournament	Malaya	1–4	South Vietnam	Kuala Lumpur, Malaysia
--:-- UTC+8	Abdul Ghani Minhat 12'		Kane 2', 55'; Lê Hữu Đức 54', 62'	Stadium: Merdeka Stadium

5 September 1957 Merdeka Tournament	Indonesia	3–1	South Vietnam	Kuala Lumpur, Malaysia
--:-- UTC+8	Tee San Liong 10'; Omo Suratmo 17'; Saari 50'		Trần Văn Đôn 78'	Stadium: Merdeka Stadium

27 October Friendly	South Vietnam	1–0	Malaya	Saigon, South Vietnam

==== 1958 ====
25 May 1958 Asian Games	South Vietnam	1–1	Pakistan	Tokyo, Japan
--:-- UTC+9

27 May 1958 Asian Games	Malaya	1–6	South Vietnam	Tokyo, Japan
--:-- UTC+9	Omar 65' (pen.)	Report	Đỗ Quang Thách 4', 26', 35'; Truong Van Duoc 40'; Luu Tan Ngoc 49'; Nguyễn Văn Tư 56'

30 May 1958 Asian Games	South Korea	3–1	South Vietnam	Tokyo, Japan
--:-- UTC+9	Choi Kwang-seok 55'; Woo Sang-kwon 75'; Sung Nak-woon 80'		Lại Văn Ngôn 20'

30 August 1958 Merdeka Tournament	Singapore	4–4	South Vietnam	Kuala Lumpur, Malaysia
--:-- UTC+8				Stadium: Merdeka Stadium

2 September 1958 Merdeka Tournament	Indonesia	4–1	South Vietnam	Kuala Lumpur, Malaysia
--:-- UTC+8	Liong Houw 20' (pen.); Bakir 25'; Saari 38'; Soerjadi 52'		Han 70'	Stadium: Merdeka Stadium; Attendance: 10,000; Referee: T. Nadarajah (Malaya)

4 September 1958 Merdeka Tournament	Malaya	2–0	South Vietnam	Kuala Lumpur, Malaysia
--:-- UTC+8				Stadium: Merdeka Stadium

==== 1959 ====
9 May 1960 AFC Asian Cup qualification	Singapore	1–4	South Vietnam	Kallang, Singapore
20:00 UTC+8				Stadium: Jalan Besar Stadium

13 May 1960 AFC Asian Cup qualification	South Vietnam	1–0	Malaya	Kallang, Singapore
20:00 UTC+8	Hà Tâm 4'			Stadium: Jalan Besar Stadium

30 August 1959 Merdeka Tournament	South Vietnam	3–2	South Korea	Kuala Lumpur, Malaysia
--:-- UTC+8	Hà Tâm 38', 88'; Đỗ Thới Vinh 39'		Son Myung-sub 2' (pen.); Cho Yoon-ok 10'	Stadium: Merdeka Stadium

2 September 1959 Merdeka Tournament	Malaya	4–3	South Vietnam	Kuala Lumpur, Malaysia
--:-- UTC+8				Stadium: Merdeka Stadium

5 September 1959 Merdeka Tournament	South Vietnam	4–1	Hong Kong	Kuala Lumpur, Malaysia
--:-- UTC+8				Stadium: Merdeka Stadium

6 September 1959 Merdeka Tournament	South Vietnam	2–2	India	Kuala Lumpur, Malaysia
--:-- UTC+8	Đỗ Thới Vinh 20', 53'	Report	Zulfiqaruddin 8'; Kannan 56'	Stadium: Merdeka Stadium

10 September 1959 Singapore Festival	South Vietnam	5–1	India	Kallang, Singapore
--:-- UTC+8		Report

15 September Friendly	South Vietnam	2–1	Japan	Saigon, South Vietnam
	Trần Văn Đôn 57'; Lê Văn Hồ 71'	Report	Watanabe 29'	Stadium: Tao Đàn Stadium; Referee: Trương Vĩnh Ký

13 December 1959 SEAP Games	South Vietnam	4–0	Thailand	Bangkok, Thailand
--:-- UTC+8

14 December 1959 SEAP Games	South Vietnam	3–0	Burma	Bangkok, Thailand
--:-- UTC+8

15 December 1959 SEAP Games	Malaya	2–1	South Vietnam	Bangkok, Thailand
--:-- UTC+8

17 December 1959 SEAP Games	South Vietnam	3–1	Thailand	Bangkok, Thailand
--:-- UTC+8	Đỗ Thới Vinh 21'; Đỗ Quang Thách (40–45); Lê Văn Tỉ (2nd half)		Suthan 31'

=== 1960s ===
==== 1960 ====
6 August 1960 Merdeka Tournament	South Vietnam	1–3	Hong Kong	Kuala Lumpur, Malaysia
--:-- UTC+8		Report		Stadium: Merdeka Stadium

7 August 1960 Merdeka Tournament	Singapore	1–2	South Vietnam	Kuala Lumpur, Malaysia
--:-- UTC+8		Report		Stadium: Merdeka Stadium

10 August 1960 Merdeka Tournament	South Vietnam	0–0	South Korea	Kuala Lumpur, Malaysia
--:-- UTC+8		Report		Stadium: Merdeka Stadium

13 August 1960 Merdeka Tournament	Indonesia	5–3	South Vietnam	Kuala Lumpur, Malaysia
--:-- UTC+8	Suratmo 6' (pen.), 53'; San Liong 22'; Timisela 60', 76'	Report	Trần Văn Đôn 31'; Lâm Văn Bốn 51'; Tạ Vinh Trạch 67'	Stadium: Merdeka Stadium

17 August Friendly	Indonesia	1–1	South Vietnam	Singapore
--:-- UTC+8

18 August Friendly	South Vietnam	2–2	Pakistan	Kallang, Singapore
--:-- UTC+8			Qayyum 1'; Moosa (?)	Stadium: Jalan Besar Stadium

14 October 1960 AFC Asian Cup	South Korea	5–1	South Vietnam	Seoul, South Korea
15:15 UTC+9	Cho Yoon-ok 15', 71'; Woo Sang-kwon 27'; Choi Chung-min 47'; Moon Jung-sik 56'	Report	Nguyễn Văn Tư 70'	Stadium: Hyochang Stadium; Attendance: 30,000

17 October 1960 AFC Asian Cup	Republic of China	2–0	South Vietnam	Seoul, South Korea
15:00 UTC+9	Luk Man Wai 51'; Yiu Cheuk Yin (?)	Report		Stadium: Hyochang Stadium

19 October 1960 AFC Asian Cup	South Vietnam	1–5	Israel	Seoul, South Korea
15:00 UTC+9	Trần Văn Nhung 68' (pen.)	Report	R. Levi 13'; Stelmach 18'; S. Levi 25'; Menchel 32'; Aharonskind 70'	Stadium: Hyochang Stadium

==== 1961 ====
3 August 1961 Merdeka Tournament	South Vietnam	2–1	India	Kuala Lumpur, Malaysia
--:-- UTC+8	Do Tho Vinh 58'; Ron Ly Van 76'	Report	Y. Khan 37'	Stadium: Merdeka Stadium; Referee: H. Angullia (Singapore)

5 August 1961 Merdeka Tournament	Malaya	3–1	South Vietnam	Kuala Lumpur, Malaysia
--:-- UTC+8		Report		Stadium: Merdeka Stadium

10 August 1961 Merdeka Tournament	South Vietnam	3–2	Japan	Kuala Lumpur, Malaysia
--:-- UTC+8		Report		Stadium: Merdeka Stadium

13 August 1961 Merdeka Tournament	Singapore	1–2	South Vietnam	Kuala Lumpur, Malaysia
--:-- UTC+8		Report		Stadium: Merdeka Stadium

16 August 1961 Singapore Festival	South Vietnam	2–1	Thailand	Singapore
--:-- UTC+8		Report

17 August 1961 Singapore Festival	South Vietnam	3–1	India	Singapore
--:-- UTC+8		Report

21 October 1961 South Vietnam Independence Cup	South Vietnam	4–1	Indonesia	Saigon, South Vietnam
--:-- UTC+7		Report		Stadium: Cộng Hòa Stadium

26 October 1961 South Vietnam Independence Cup	South Vietnam	1–0	Malaya	Saigon, South Vietnam
--:-- UTC+7		Report		Stadium: Cộng Hòa Stadium

11 December 1961 SEAP Games	Thailand	0–0	South Vietnam	Rangoon, Burma
--:-- UTC+6		Report		Stadium: Bogyoke Aung San Stadium

12 December 1961 SEAP Games	South Vietnam	7–0	Laos	Rangoon, Burma
--:-- UTC+6		Report		Stadium: Bogyoke Aung San Stadium; Referee: Tin Maung Oo (Burma)

14 December 1961 SEAP Games	South Vietnam	1–2	Burma	Rangoon, Burma
--:-- UTC+6		Report		Stadium: Bogyoke Aung San Stadium

16 December 1961 SEAP Games	Thailand	1–1	South Vietnam	Rangoon, Burma
--:-- UTC+6		Report		Stadium: Bogyoke Aung San Stadium; Referee: Tin Maung Oo (Burma)

==== 1962 ====
19 February Friendly	Indonesia	1–2	South Vietnam	Jakarta, Indonesia
--:-- UTC+7	Hidajat 37'	Report	Trần Ta 20'; Trần Văn Nhung 55'	Stadium: Ikada Stadium; Attendance: 45,000; Referee: Kuntadi (Indonesia)

14 July Friendly	South Vietnam	1–1	Taiwan	Saigon, South Vietnam
--:-- UTC+7				Stadium: Cộng Hòa Stadium

25 August 1962 Asian Games	Indonesia	1–0	South Vietnam	Jakarta, Indonesia
--:-- UTC+7		Report		Stadium: Gelora Senayan Stadium

29 August 1962 Asian Games	Malaya	0–3	South Vietnam	Jakarta, Indonesia
--:-- UTC+7		Report

30 August 1962 Asian Games	South Vietnam	6–0	Philippines	Jakarta, Indonesia
--:-- UTC+7		Report

1 September 1962 Asian Games	South Vietnam	2–3	India	Jakarta, Indonesia
--:-- UTC+7	Phan Dương Cầm 52' (pen.); Đỗ Thới Vinh 64'	Report	Goswami 13', 75'; J. Singh 41'	Stadium: Gelora Senayan Stadium

3 September 1962 Asian Games	South Vietnam	1–4	Malaya	Jakarta, Indonesia
--:-- UTC+7		Report		Stadium: Gelora Senayan Stadium

14 September 1962 Merdeka Tournament	Indonesia	2–1	South Vietnam	Kuala Lumpur, Malaysia
--:-- UTC+8	Mubarak 43'; Timisela 50'	Report	Phan Dương Cầm 46' (pen.)	Stadium: Merdeka Stadium

16 September 1962 Merdeka Tournament	South Vietnam	6–0	Philippines	Kuala Lumpur, Malaysia
--:-- UTC+8		Report		Stadium: Merdeka Stadium

17 September 1962 Merdeka Tournament	Singapore	2–2	South Vietnam	Kuala Lumpur, Malaysia
--:-- UTC+8		Report		Stadium: Merdeka Stadium

25 October 1962 South Vietnam Independence Cup	South Vietnam	4–0	Indonesia	Saigon, South Vietnam
--:-- UTC+7		Report		Stadium: Cộng Hòa Stadium

28 October 1962 South Vietnam Independence Cup	South Vietnam	0–1	Thailand	Saigon, South Vietnam
--:-- UTC+7		Report		Stadium: Cộng Hòa Stadium
Note: Match abandoned at the 63rd minute

30 October 1962 South Vietnam Independence Cup	South Vietnam	2–0	Malaya	Saigon, South Vietnam
--:-- UTC+7		Report		Stadium: Cộng Hòa Stadium

31 October 1962 South Vietnam Independence Cup	Indonesia	0–2	South Vietnam	Saigon, South Vietnam
--:-- UTC+7		Report		Stadium: Cộng Hòa Stadium

==== 1963 ====
9 August 1963 Merdeka Tournament	South Vietnam	1–1	Taiwan	Kuala Lumpur, Malaysia
--:-- UTC+8		Report		Stadium: Merdeka Stadium

11 August 1963 Merdeka Tournament	Malaya	0–5	South Vietnam	Kuala Lumpur, Malaysia
--:-- UTC+8		Report		Stadium: Merdeka Stadium

12 August 1963 Merdeka Tournament	South Vietnam	1–5	Japan	Kuala Lumpur, Malaysia
--:-- UTC+8		Report		Stadium: Merdeka Stadium

14 August 1963 Merdeka Tournament	South Vietnam	1–3	South Korea	Kuala Lumpur, Malaysia
--:-- UTC+8		Report		Stadium: Merdeka Stadium

14 August 1963 Merdeka Tournament	Thailand	2–3	South Vietnam	Kuala Lumpur, Malaysia
--:-- UTC+8		Report		Stadium: Merdeka Stadium

12 October Tokyo International Sports Week 1963	Japan	2–1	South Vietnam	Tokyo, Japan
--:-- UTC+9		Report		Stadium: Chichibunomiya Stadium

7 December 1964 AFC Asian Cup qualification	South Vietnam	5–3	Malaysia	Saigon, South Vietnam
--:-- UTC+7		Report		Stadium: Cộng Hòa Stadium

11 December 1964 AFC Asian Cup qualification	South Vietnam	1–4	Hong Kong	Saigon, South Vietnam
--:-- UTC+7		Report		Stadium: Cộng Hòa Stadium

14 December 1964 AFC Asian Cup qualification	South Vietnam	3–0	Thailand	Saigon, South Vietnam
--:-- UTC+7		Report		Stadium: Cộng Hòa Stadium

28 December 1964 Summer Olympics qualification	South Vietnam	0–1	Israel	Saigon, South Vietnam
--:-- UTC+7		Report	Young 20'	Stadium: Cộng Hòa Stadium; Attendance: 25,000; Referee: Greg da Silva (Malaysia)

==== 1964 ====
17 March 1964 Summer Olympics qualification	Israel	0–2 (1–2 agg.)	South Vietnam	Ramat Gan, Israel
--:-- UTC+3		Report	Nguyễn Văn Quảng 27'; Nguyễn Văn Ngôn 41'	Stadium: Ramat Gan Stadium; Attendance: 36,937; Referee: Hakkı Gürüz (Turkey)

22 May Friendly	Thailand	4–1	South Vietnam	Bangkok, Thailand
--:-- UTC+7

23 May Friendly	Thailand	0–1	South Vietnam	Bangkok, Thailand
--:-- UTC+7		Report

31 May 1964 Summer Olympics qualification	South Korea	3–0	South Vietnam	Seoul, South Korea
--:-- UTC+9		Report		Stadium: Hyochang Stadium; Attendance: 20,000

28 June 1964 Summer Olympics qualification	South Vietnam	2–2 (2–5 agg.)	South Korea	Saigon, South Vietnam
--:-- UTC+7		Report		Stadium: Cộng Hòa Stadium; Attendance: 30,000

30 June Friendly	South Vietnam	1–2	South Korea	Saigon, South Vietnam
--:-- UTC+7				Stadium: Cộng Hòa Stadium

28 August 1964 Merdeka Tournament	South Vietnam	1–1	Taiwan	Kuala Lumpur, Malaysia
--:-- UTC+8		Report		Stadium: Merdeka Stadium

30 August 1964 Merdeka Tournament	Malaysia	1–2	South Vietnam	Kuala Lumpur, Malaysia
--:-- UTC+8		Report		Stadium: Merdeka Stadium

2 September 1964 Merdeka Tournament	South Vietnam	0–1	Burma	Kuala Lumpur, Malaysia
--:-- UTC+8		Report		Stadium: Merdeka Stadium

==== 1965 ====
15 August 1965 Merdeka Tournament	South Vietnam	5–2	Taiwan	Kuala Lumpur, Malaysia
--:-- UTC+8		Report		Stadium: Merdeka Stadium

17 August 1965 Merdeka Tournament	South Vietnam	2–1	Hong Kong	Kuala Lumpur, Malaysia
--:-- UTC+8		Report		Stadium: Merdeka Stadium

19 August 1965 Merdeka Tournament	Malaysia	3–3	South Vietnam	Kuala Lumpur, Malaysia
--:-- UTC+8		Report		Stadium: Merdeka Stadium

21 August 1965 Merdeka Tournament	South Korea	0–0	South Vietnam	Kuala Lumpur, Malaysia
--:-- UTC+8		Report		Stadium: Merdeka Stadium

25 August 1965 Merdeka Tournament	South Vietnam	0–2	India	Kuala Lumpur, Malaysia
--:-- UTC+8		Report		Stadium: Merdeka Stadium

28 August 1965 Merdeka Tournament	South Vietnam	1–2	Japan	Kuala Lumpur, Malaysia
--:-- UTC+8		Report		Stadium: Merdeka Stadium

13 November 1965 South Vietnam Independence Cup	South Vietnam	4–0	Thailand	Saigon, South Vietnam
--:-- UTC+7		Report		Stadium: Cộng Hòa Stadium

16 November 1965 South Vietnam Independence Cup	South Vietnam	2–2	Malaysia	Saigon, South Vietnam
--:-- UTC+7		Report		Stadium: Cộng Hòa Stadium

15 December 1965 SEAP Games	Thailand	2–1	South Vietnam	Kuala Lumpur, Malaysia
--:-- UTC+8		Report		Stadium: Merdeka Stadium

16 December 1965 SEAP Games	Singapore	1–5	South Vietnam	Kuala Lumpur, Malaysia
--:-- UTC+8	Omar 27'	Report	Nguyen Văn Long 15' 41' 72'; Trần Chanh 32'; Quang Kim Phụng 78'	Stadium: Merdeka Stadium

18 December 1965 SEAP Games	Thailand	2–0	South Vietnam	Kuala Lumpur, Malaysia
--:-- UTC+8	Praderm 57'; Yonyong 64'	Report		Stadium: Merdeka Stadium

20 December 1965 SEAP Games	Malaysia	0–2	South Vietnam	Kuala Lumpur, Malaysia
--:-- UTC+8		Report		Stadium: Merdeka Stadium

==== 1966 ====
13 August 1966 Merdeka Tournament	Malaysia	2–5	South Vietnam	Kuala Lumpur, Malaysia
--:-- UTC+8		Report		Stadium: Merdeka Stadium

17 August 1966 Merdeka Tournament	Singapore	1–2	South Vietnam	Kuala Lumpur, Malaysia
--:-- UTC+8		Report		Stadium: Merdeka Stadium

20 August 1966 Merdeka Tournament	South Vietnam	3–0	Taiwan	Kuala Lumpur, Malaysia
--:-- UTC+8		Report		Stadium: Merdeka Stadium

23 August 1966 Merdeka Tournament	South Vietnam	0–1	India	Kuala Lumpur, Malaysia
--:-- UTC+8		Report		Stadium: Merdeka Stadium

25 August 1966 Merdeka Tournament	South Vietnam	2–0	Japan	Kuala Lumpur, Malaysia
--:-- UTC+8		Report		Stadium: Merdeka Stadium

28 August 1966 Merdeka Tournament	South Vietnam	1–0	Burma	Kuala Lumpur, Malaysia
--:-- UTC+8	Nguyễn Văn Chiêu 71'	Report		Stadium: Merdeka Stadium; Attendance: 30,000; Referee: Oei Poh Hwa (Malaysia)

29 August Friendly	Singapore	1–1	South Vietnam	Singapore
--:-- UTC+8

1 November 1966 South Vietnam Independence Cup	South Vietnam	3–2	Malaysia	Saigon, South Vietnam
--:-- UTC+7		Report		Stadium: Cộng Hòa Stadium

5 November 1966 South Vietnam Independence Cup	South Vietnam	4–1	Thailand	Saigon, South Vietnam
--:-- UTC+7		Report		Stadium: Cộng Hòa Stadium

11 December 1966 Asian Games	Indonesia	0–0	South Vietnam	Bangkok, Thailand
--:-- UTC+7		Report

12 December 1966 Asian Games	South Vietnam	2–1	Taiwan	Bangkok, Thailand
--:-- UTC+7		Report

14 December 1966 Asian Games	Singapore	5–0	South Vietnam	Bangkok, Thailand
--:-- UTC+7		Report

==== 1967 ====
22 March 1968 AFC Asian Cup qualification	Hong Kong	2–0	South Vietnam	Hong Kong Island, British Hong Kong
--:-- UTC+8		Report		Stadium: Government Stadium

24 March 1968 AFC Asian Cup qualification	South Vietnam	1–0	Thailand	Hong Kong Island, British Hong Kong
--:-- UTC+8		Report		Stadium: Government Stadium

29 March 1968 AFC Asian Cup qualification	South Vietnam	0–2	Malaysia	Hong Kong Island, British Hong Kong
--:-- UTC+8		Report		Stadium: Government Stadium

2 April 1968 AFC Asian Cup qualification	South Vietnam	3–0	Singapore	Hong Kong Island, British Hong Kong
--:-- UTC+8		Report		Stadium: Government Stadium

12 August 1967 Merdeka Tournament	South Vietnam	5–0	Hong Kong	Kuala Lumpur, Malaysia
--:-- UTC+8		Report		Stadium: Merdeka Stadium

15 August 1967 Merdeka Tournament	Malaysia	1–1	South Vietnam	Kuala Lumpur, Malaysia
--:-- UTC+8		Report		Stadium: Merdeka Stadium

19 August 1967 Merdeka Tournament	Thailand	2–5	South Vietnam	Ipoh, Malaysia
--:-- UTC+8		Report		Stadium: Perak Stadium

20 August 1967 Merdeka Tournament	South Vietnam	1–0	India	Ipoh, Malaysia
--:-- UTC+8		Report		Stadium: Perak Stadium

22 August 1967 Merdeka Tournament	South Vietnam	0–3	Burma	Kuala Lumpur, Malaysia
--:-- UTC+8		Report		Stadium: Merdeka Stadium

25 August 1967 Merdeka Tournament	South Vietnam	2–1	Malaysia	Kuala Lumpur, Malaysia
--:-- UTC+8		Report		Stadium: Merdeka Stadium

28 August Friendly	Singapore	1–0	South Vietnam	Singapore
--:-- UTC+8

1 October 1968 Summer Olympics qualification	South Vietnam	10–0	Philippines	Tokyo, Japan
--:-- UTC+9		Report

3 October 1968 Summer Olympics qualification	South Korea	3–0	South Vietnam	Tokyo, Japan
--:-- UTC+9		Report

7 October 1968 Summer Olympics qualification	South Vietnam	3–0	Taiwan	Tokyo, Japan
--:-- UTC+9		Report

9 October 1968 Summer Olympics qualification	Lebanon	1–1	South Vietnam	Tokyo, Japan
--:-- UTC+9		Report

10 October 1968 Summer Olympics qualification	Japan	1–0	South Vietnam	Tokyo, Japan
--:-- UTC+9		Report		Attendance: 23,010; Referee: Tang Sun Cheung (Taiwan)

4 November 1967 South Vietnam Independence Cup	South Vietnam	2–0	Singapore	Saigon, South Vietnam
--:-- UTC+7		Report		Stadium: Cộng Hòa Stadium

7 November 1967 South Vietnam Independence Cup	South Vietnam	0–1	Australia	Saigon, South Vietnam
--:-- UTC+7		Report		Stadium: Cộng Hòa Stadium

10 November 1967 South Vietnam Independence Cup	South Vietnam	5–1	New Zealand	Saigon, South Vietnam
--:-- UTC+7		Report		Stadium: Cộng Hòa Stadium

12 November 1967 South Vietnam Independence Cup	South Korea	3–0	South Vietnam	Saigon, South Vietnam
--:-- UTC+7		Report		Stadium: Cộng Hòa Stadium

14 November 1967 South Vietnam Independence Cup	Malaysia	1–4	South Vietnam	Saigon, South Vietnam
--:-- UTC+7		Report		Stadium: Cộng Hòa Stadium

11 December 1967 SEAP Games	Laos	0–5	South Vietnam	Bangkok, Thailand
--:-- UTC+7		Report		Stadium: National Stadium

14 December 1967 SEAP Games	South Vietnam	5–0	Thailand	Bangkok, Thailand
--:-- UTC+7		Report		Stadium: National Stadium

16 December 1967 SEAP Games	Burma	2–1	South Vietnam	Bangkok, Thailand
--:-- UTC+7		Report		Stadium: National Stadium

==== 1968 ====
10 August 1968 Merdeka Tournament	South Vietnam	0–3	Burma	Kuala Lumpur, Malaysia
--:-- UTC+8		Report		Stadium: Merdeka Stadium

12 August 1968 Merdeka Tournament	South Vietnam	2–3	India	Kuala Lumpur, Malaysia
--:-- UTC+8		Report		Stadium: Merdeka Stadium

14 August 1968 Merdeka Tournament	Malaysia	4–0	South Vietnam	Ipoh, Malaysia
--:-- UTC+8		Report		Stadium: Perak Stadium

15 August 1968 Merdeka Tournament	Thailand	2–3	South Vietnam	Ipoh, Malaysia
--:-- UTC+8		Report		Stadium: Perak Stadium

18 August 1968 Merdeka Tournament	South Vietnam	3–1	Hong Kong	Kuala Lumpur, Malaysia
--:-- UTC+8		Report		Stadium: Merdeka Stadium

28 August 1968 Singapore Festival	Singapore	1–0	South Vietnam	Kallang, Singapore
--:-- UTC+8		Report		Stadium: Jalan Besar Stadium

30 August 1968 Singapore Festival	South Vietnam	2–0	India	Kallang, Singapore
--:-- UTC+8		Report		Stadium: Jalan Besar Stadium

==== 1969 ====
21 November 1969 King's Cup	Indonesia	3–1	South Vietnam	Bangkok, Thailand
--:-- UTC+7	Mulyadi 22' (pen.); Timisela 24'; Sihasale 80'	Report	Quang Kim Phụng 35'

23 November 1969 King's Cup	South Vietnam	1–1	Singapore	Bangkok, Thailand
--:-- UTC+7	Quah Kim Lye 30'	Report	Nguyễn Văn Ngôn 17'

26 November 1969 King's Cup	South Korea	3–0	South Vietnam	Bangkok, Thailand
--:-- UTC+7	Chung Kyu-poong 40', 56'; Chung Byung-tak 41'	Report

28 November 1969 King's Cup	Laos	0–7	South Vietnam	Bangkok, Thailand
--:-- UTC+7		Report

7 December 1969 SEAP Games	Malaysia	2–1	South Vietnam	Rangoon, Burma
--:-- UTC+6		Report		Stadium: Bogyoke Aung San Stadium

9 December 1969 SEAP Games	Laos	0–0	South Vietnam	Rangoon, Burma
--:-- UTC+6		Report		Stadium: Bogyoke Aung San Stadium

=== 1970s ===
==== 1970 ====
26 April 1970 Friendship Cup	South Vietnam	0–1	Australia	Saigon, South Vietnam
--:-- UTC+7		Report		Stadium: Cộng Hòa Stadium

30 July 1970 Merdeka Tournament	Malaysia	0–0	South Vietnam	Kuala Lumpur, Malaysia
--:-- UTC+8		Report		Stadium: Merdeka Stadium

1 August 1970 Merdeka Tournament	South Vietnam	1–2	Taiwan	Kuala Lumpur, Malaysia
--:-- UTC+8		Report		Stadium: Merdeka Stadium

5 August 1970 Merdeka Tournament	Burma	4–2	South Vietnam	Kuala Lumpur, Malaysia
--:-- UTC+8		Report		Stadium: Merdeka Stadium

9 August 1970 Merdeka Tournament	South Vietnam	1–2	India	Ipoh, Malaysia
--:-- UTC+8		Report		Stadium: Perak Stadium

13 August 1970 Merdeka Tournament	South Vietnam	4–0	Singapore	Kuala Lumpur, Malaysia
--:-- UTC+8		Report		Stadium: Merdeka Stadium

3 October Friendly	South Vietnam	2–2	Khmer Republic	Saigon, South Vietnam
		Report		Stadium: Cộng Hòa Stadium

4 October Friendly	South Vietnam	1–1	Khmer Republic	Saigon, South Vietnam
		Report		Stadium: Cộng Hòa Stadium

23 October Friendly	South Vietnam	4–0	Laos	Saigon, South Vietnam
--:-- UTC+7		Report		Stadium: Cộng Hòa Stadium

29 October 1970 South Vietnam Independence Cup	South Vietnam	1–1	Malaysia	Saigon, South Vietnam
--:-- UTC+7		Report		Stadium: Cộng Hòa Stadium

31 October 1970 South Vietnam Independence Cup	South Vietnam	3–1	Indonesia	Saigon, South Vietnam
--:-- UTC+7		Report		Stadium: Cộng Hòa Stadium

1 November 1970 South Vietnam Independence Cup	South Vietnam	1–0	Thailand	Saigon, South Vietnam
--:-- UTC+7		Report		Stadium: Cộng Hòa Stadium

9 November 1970 King's Cup	South Vietnam	3–5	Indonesia	Bangkok, Thailand
--:-- UTC+7	Cù Sinh 42'; Trần Tiết Văn 88' ? (?)	Report	Waskito 5', 12', 70'; Kadir 59', 63'

13 November 1970 King's Cup	Khmer Republic	2–2	South Vietnam	Bangkok, Thailand
--:-- UTC+7		Report

15 November 1970 King's Cup	Malaysia	2–1	South Vietnam	Bangkok, Thailand
--:-- UTC+7	Bakar 22'; Salleh 63'	Report	Lê Văn Sang 30'

11 December 1970 Asian Games	South Vietnam	0–2	India	Bangkok, Thailand
--:-- UTC+7		Report	Habib 76'; Rajvi 85'

13 December 1970 Asian Games	Thailand	1–0	South Vietnam	Bangkok, Thailand
--:-- UTC+7	Sudtha 41'	Report

December Friendly	South Vietnam	0–3	Khmer Republic	Saigon, South Vietnam
		Report		Stadium: Cộng Hòa Stadium

==== 1971 ====
2 May 1971 President's Cup Football Tournament	Indonesia	9–1	South Vietnam	Seoul, South Korea
16:30 UTC+9		Report		Stadium: Dongdaemun Stadium

6 May 1971 President's Cup Football Tournament	South Vietnam	0–2	Burma	Seoul, South Korea
18:00 UTC+9		Report		Stadium: Dongdaemun Stadium

9 May 1971 President's Cup Football Tournament	Hong Kong	2–0	South Vietnam	Seoul, South Korea
15:00 UTC+9		Report		Stadium: Dongdaemun Stadium

4 August 1971 Merdeka Tournament	Malaysia	2–0	South Vietnam	Kuala Lumpur, Malaysia
--:-- UTC+8	Zawawi 28' ? 74' (o.g.)	Report		Stadium: Merdeka Stadium

6 August 1971 Merdeka Tournament	South Vietnam	2–0	Japan	Kuala Lumpur, Malaysia
--:-- UTC+8	Trần Văn Xinh 20'; Cù Sinh 42'	Report		Stadium: Merdeka Stadium

10 August 1971 Merdeka Tournament	Thailand	2–4	South Vietnam	Kuala Lumpur, Malaysia
--:-- UTC+8	Kasiwat 15'; Romrongvejt 24'	Report	Võ Bá Hùng 4'; Cù Sinh 8', 77'; Trần Văn Xinh 72'	Stadium: Merdeka Stadium

12 August 1971 Merdeka Tournament	South Vietnam	2–3	Taiwan	Kuala Lumpur, Malaysia
--:-- UTC+8	Trần Tiết Anh 35'; Võ Bá Hùng 43'	Report	Ho Sun Wah 10'; Leung Siu Wah 44'; Chan Ciu Ki 82'	Stadium: Merdeka Stadium

12 August 1971 Merdeka Tournament	South Vietnam	0–1	South Korea	Kuala Lumpur, Malaysia
--:-- UTC+8		Report	Na Seong-soo 43'	Stadium: Merdeka Stadium

21 August 1971 Merdeka Tournament	South Vietnam	3–1	Hong Kong	Kuala Lumpur, Malaysia
--:-- UTC+8	Trần Tiết Anh 11'; Võ Bá Hùng 49'; Trần Văn Xinh 66'	Report	Ho Sun Wah 10'; Leung Siu Wah 44'; Chan Ciu Ki 82'	Stadium: Merdeka Stadium

24 August 1971 Pesta Sukan Cup	South Vietnam	1–0	South Korea	Kallang, Singapore
--:-- UTC+8	? 87'	Report		Stadium: Jalan Besar Stadium

26 August 1971 Pesta Sukan Cup	Thailand	1–2	South Vietnam	Kallang, Singapore
--:-- UTC+8		Report		Stadium: Jalan Besar Stadium

28 August 1971 Pesta Sukan Cup	India	0–0 (a.e.t.)	South Vietnam	Kallang, Singapore
--:-- UTC+8		Report		Stadium: Jalan Besar Stadium

28 October 1971 South Vietnam Independence Cup	South Vietnam	1–0	Malaysia	Saigon, South Vietnam
--:-- UTC+7		Report		Stadium: Cộng Hòa Stadium

30 October 1971 South Vietnam Independence Cup	South Vietnam	3–0	Thailand	Saigon, South Vietnam
--:-- UTC+7		Report		Stadium: Cộng Hòa Stadium

31 October 1971 South Vietnam Independence Cup	South Vietnam	1–1 (a.e.t.) (4–4 p)	Malaysia	Saigon, South Vietnam
--:-- UTC+7		Report		Stadium: Cộng Hòa Stadium
Note: After the five penalties each ended in a draw, the game was stopped as the crowd had gone beyond control. Malaysia were declared champions as a gesture of goodwill by the host team.

9 November 1971 King's Cup	South Vietnam	5–4	Singapore	Bangkok, Thailand
--:-- UTC+7		Report

11 November 1971 King's Cup	Thailand	0–1	South Vietnam	Bangkok, Thailand
--:-- UTC+7		Report

14 November 1971 King's Cup	South Vietnam	1–1 (1–2 p)	South Korea	Bangkok, Thailand
--:-- UTC+7	Trần Thiết An 16'	Report	Kim Chang-il 68'

16 November 1971 King's Cup	South Vietnam	3–2	Indonesia	Bangkok, Thailand
--:-- UTC+7		Report

12 December 1971 SEAP Games	Burma	0–0	South Vietnam	Kuala Lumpur, Malaysia
--:-- UTC+7		Report		Stadium: Merdeka Stadium

13 December 1971 SEAP Games	South Vietnam	3–1	Singapore	Kuala Lumpur, Malaysia
--:-- UTC+7	Trần Văn Xinh 33', 43'; Trần Tiết Anh 61'	Report	Quah Kim Song 31'	Stadium: Merdeka Stadium

17 December 1971 SEAP Games	Malaysia	3–2	South Vietnam	Kuala Lumpur, Malaysia
--:-- UTC+7	Abdullah 46', 66', 76'	Report	Dương Văn Tha 5'; Trần Tiết Anh 27'	Stadium: Merdeka Stadium

18 December 1971 SEAP Games	Thailand	0–0	South Vietnam	Kuala Lumpur, Malaysia
--:-- UTC+7		Report		Stadium: Merdeka Stadium

==== 1972 ====
15 October Friendly	South Vietnam	0–1	Australia	Saigon, South Vietnam
--:-- UTC+7		Report	Buljevic 69'	Stadium: Cộng Hòa Stadium; Attendance: 15,000

28 October 1972 South Vietnam Independence Cup	South Vietnam	0–0	Malaysia	Saigon, South Vietnam
--:-- UTC+7		Report		Stadium: Cộng Hòa Stadium

29 October 1972 South Vietnam Independence Cup	South Vietnam	4–1	Singapore	Saigon, South Vietnam
--:-- UTC+7		Report		Stadium: Cộng Hòa Stadium

1 November 1972 South Vietnam Independence Cup	South Vietnam	1–2 (a.e.t.)	Khmer Republic	Saigon, South Vietnam
--:-- UTC+7		Report		Stadium: Cộng Hòa Stadium

==== 1973 ====
28 January Friendly	South Vietnam	5–0	Taiwan	Saigon, South Vietnam
--:-- UTC+7				Stadium: Cộng Hòa Stadium

16 May 1974 FIFA World Cup qualification	South Vietnam	1–0	Thailand	Seoul, South Korea
--:-- UTC+9	Meelarpkit 83' (o.g.)	Report		Stadium: Dongdaemun Stadium; Attendance: 4,091; Referee: Les Coffman (New Zealand)

20 May 1974 FIFA World Cup qualification	Japan	4–0	South Vietnam	Seoul, South Korea
--:-- UTC+9	Kamamoto 6', 86'; Mori 19'; Quang 54' (o.g.)	Report		Stadium: Dongdaemun Stadium; Attendance: 6,352; Referee: Les Coffman (New Zealand)

24 May 1974 FIFA World Cup qualification	Hong Kong	1–0	South Vietnam	Seoul, South Korea
--:-- UTC+9	Yuen Kuen Chu 68'	Report		Stadium: Dongdaemun Stadium; Attendance: 6,352; Referee: Aing Kim Ean (Khmer Republic)

27 July 1973 Merdeka Tournament	India	2–1	South Vietnam	Kuala Lumpur, Malaysia
--:-- UTC+8	Magan 32'; Pereira 57'	Report	Hồ Thanh Cang 8'	Stadium: Merdeka Stadium

29 July 1973 Merdeka Tournament	South Vietnam	1–1	Bangladesh	Kuala Lumpur, Malaysia
--:-- UTC+8	Nguyễn Văn Mộng 44' (pen.)	Report	Nannu 50'	Stadium: Merdeka Stadium

2 August 1973 Merdeka Tournament	Burma	2–1	South Vietnam	Kuala Lumpur, Malaysia
--:-- UTC+8		Report		Stadium: Merdeka Stadium

5 August 1973 Merdeka Tournament	South Vietnam	1–0	Singapore	Kuala Lumpur, Malaysia
--:-- UTC+8	Võ Thành Vân 67'	Report		Stadium: Merdeka Stadium

8 August 1973 Merdeka Tournament	Kuwait	2–1	South Vietnam	Kuala Lumpur, Malaysia
--:-- UTC+8	Mohammed 5', 62'	Report	Quảng Đức Vinh 67'	Stadium: Merdeka Stadium

10 August 1973 Merdeka Tournament	South Vietnam	1–1 (5–4 p)	India	Kuala Lumpur, Malaysia
--:-- UTC+8	Nguyễn Văn Mộng	Report	M. Prasannan	Stadium: Merdeka Stadium

3 September 1973 SEAP Games	Burma	3–2	South Vietnam	Kallang, Singapore
--:-- UTC+8	Win Maung 9'; Mya Kyaing 15'; Maung Ye Nyunt 57'	Report	Nguyễn Văn Mộng 24' (pen.); Cù Sinh 45'	Stadium: National Stadium

4 September 1973 SEAP Games	South Vietnam	5–1	Laos	Kallang, Singapore
--:-- UTC+8		Report		Stadium: National Stadium

6 September 1973 SEAP Games	Singapore	1–1 (a.e.t.) (3–5 p)	South Vietnam	Kallang, Singapore
--:-- UTC+8	Quah Kim Lye 61'	Report	Cù Sinh 63'	Stadium: National Stadium

8 September 1973 SEAP Games	Burma	3–2	South Vietnam	Kallang, Singapore
--:-- UTC+8	Mya Kyaing 39', 51', 56'	Report	Trần Văn Xinh 16'; Nguyễn Văn Mộng 84' (pen.)	Stadium: National Stadium

1 November 1973 South Vietnam Independence Cup	South Vietnam	1–5	Malaysia	Saigon, South Vietnam
--:-- UTC+7		Report		Stadium: Cộng Hòa Stadium

4 November 1973 South Vietnam Independence Cup	South Vietnam	4–2	Singapore	Saigon, South Vietnam
--:-- UTC+7		Report		Stadium: Cộng Hòa Stadium

==== 1974 ====
18 April Friendly	Khmer Republic	1–1	South Vietnam	Phnom Penh, Khmer Republic
--:-- UTC+7		Report		Stadium: Olympic Stadium

1 November 1974 South Vietnam Independence Cup	South Vietnam	1–0	Laos	Saigon, South Vietnam
--:-- UTC+7	Võ Thành Sơn 40'	Report		Stadium: Cộng Hòa Stadium

5 November 1974 South Vietnam Independence Cup	Malaysia	0–1	South Vietnam	Saigon, South Vietnam
--:-- UTC+7		Report		Stadium: Cộng Hòa Stadium

7 November 1974 South Vietnam Independence Cup	South Vietnam	1–1	Taiwan	Saigon, South Vietnam
--:-- UTC+7	Châu Chánh Trung	Report		Stadium: Cộng Hòa Stadium

9 November 1974 South Vietnam Independence Cup	South Vietnam	3–2	Thailand	Saigon, South Vietnam
--:-- UTC+7		Report		Stadium: Cộng Hòa Stadium

11 December 1974 King's Cup	Khmer Republic	3–2	South Vietnam	Bangkok, Thailand
--:-- UTC+7		Report

15 December 1974 King's Cup	South Vietnam	2–2	South Korea	Bangkok, Thailand
--:-- UTC+7	Lê Văn Tám 16'; Võ Thanh Sơn 79'	Report	Lee Cha-man 83'; Choi Jae-mo 85' (pen.)

16 December 1974 King's Cup	Khmer Republic	2–0	South Vietnam	Bangkok, Thailand
--:-- UTC+7		Report

==== 1975 ====
17 March 1976 AFC Asian Cup qualification	Indonesia	2–1	South Vietnam	Bangkok, Thailand
	Wibisono 9', 13'	Report	? 32'

19 March 1976 AFC Asian Cup qualification	South Vietnam	0–1	South Korea	Bangkok, Thailand
		Report

21 March 1976 AFC Asian Cup qualification	Thailand	4–0	South Vietnam	Bangkok, Thailand
		Report

23 March 1976 AFC Asian Cup qualification	South Vietnam	0–3	Malaysia	Bangkok, Thailand
		Report

== Head-to-head records ==
South Vietnam national football team head-to-head records (1949–1975)
Opponents	Pld	W	D	L	GF	GA	GD	Win %	Confederation
Australia	3	0	0	3	0	3	–3	00.00	OFC
Bangladesh	1	0	1	0	1	1	0	00.00	AFC
Burma	13	2	1	10	13	25	–12	15.38	AFC
Hong Kong	12	5	1	6	22	21	+1	41.67	AFC
India	15	5	3	7	22	21	+1	33.33	AFC
Indonesia	17	6	2	9	31	40	–9	35.29	AFC
Israel	4	1	0	3	4	8	–4	25.00	AFC
Japan	9	4	0	5	12	17	–5	44.44	AFC
Khmer Republic	13	6	3	4	34	24	+10	46.15	AFC
Kuwait	1	0	0	1	1	2	–1	00.00	AFC
Laos	8	7	1	0	33	2	+31	87.50	AFC
Lebanon	1	0	1	0	1	1	0	00.00	AFC
Malaysia	39	18	8	13	74	61	+13	46.15	AFC
New Zealand	1	1	0	0	5	1	+4	100.00	OFC
Pakistan	2	0	2	0	3	3	0	00.00	AFC
Philippines	4	4	0	0	25	2	+23	100.00	AFC
Singapore	24	14	6	4	58	37	+21	58.33	AFC
South Korea	19	2	6	11	19	42	–23	10.53	AFC
Taiwan	13	5	4	4	27	17	+10	38.46	AFC
Thailand	31	22	3	6	63	31	+32	70.97	AFC
