= 1960 Merdeka Tournament =

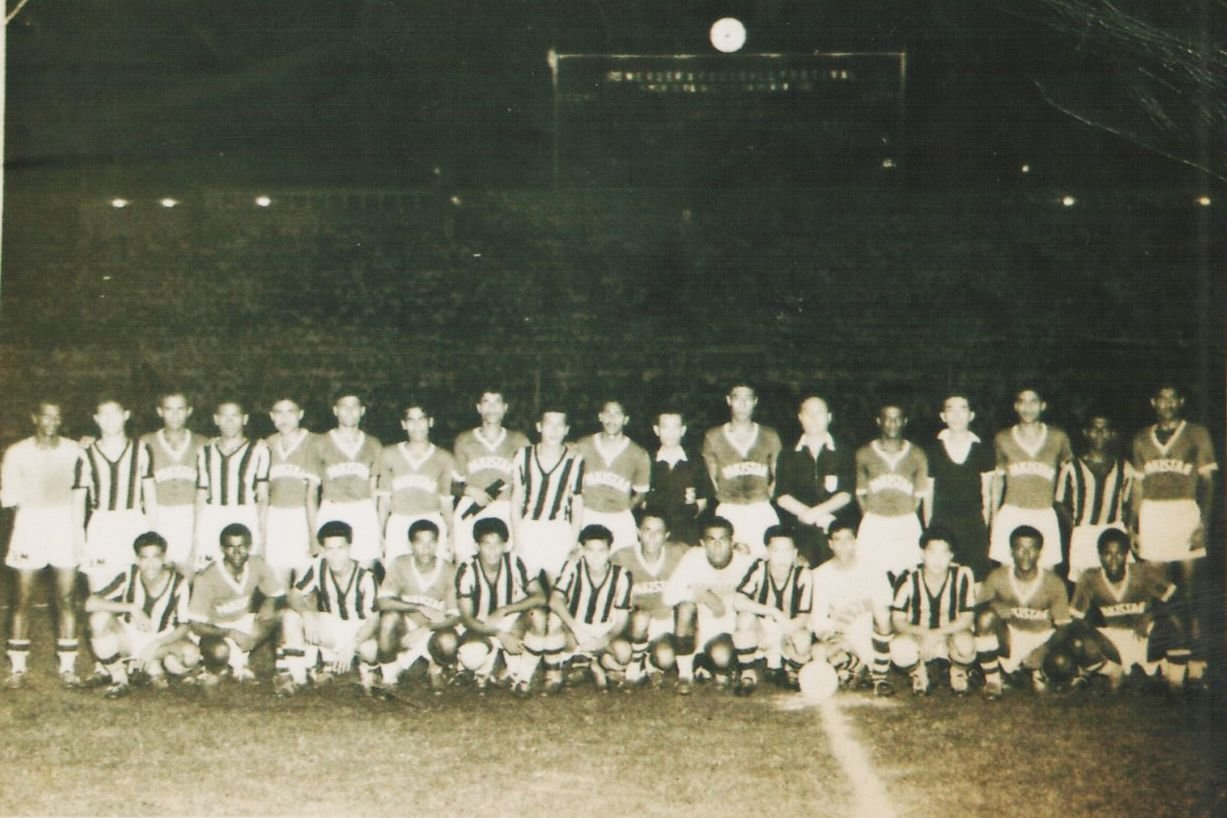
- Malaya vs Pakistan on 12 August 1960

Tournament details
- Host country: Federation of Malaya
- Dates: 5 August – 14 August
- Teams: 9
- Venue: 1 (in 1 host city)

Final positions
- Champions: Malaya; South Korea
- Third place: Indonesia
- Fourth place: Pakistan

Tournament statistics
- Matches played: 18
- Goals scored: 80 (4.44 per match)

The 1960 Merdeka Tournament was the fourth edition of the annual football tournament hosted by Malaya. It took place from August 5 to August 14 with nine participating nations. Malaya and South Korea shared the trophy after finishing the final match by 0–0.

== Group stage ==
=== Group A ===
Team	Pld	W	D	L	GF	GA	GD	Pts
South Korea	4	2	2	0	8	4	+2	6
Indonesia	4	3	0	1	16	9	+7	6
Hong Kong	4	2	0	2	8	9	−1	4
South Vietnam	4	1	1	2	6	9	−3	3
Singapore	4	0	1	3	9	16	−7	1

6 August 1960

Hong Kong	3–1	South Vietnam
Lau Chi Lam 11'; Pang Nin 47'; Wong 65'	Report	Vinh 68'

Merdeka Stadium, Kuala Lumpur
Referee: Oei Poh Hwa (Malaya)
6 August 1960

South Korea	2–0	Indonesia
Cha Tae-Sung 33', 64'	Report

Merdeka Stadium, Kuala Lumpur
Referee: Bahadur Khan (Pakistan)

7 August 1960

South Vietnam	2–1	Singapore
Nhung 7'; Vinh	Report	Toth 21' (pen.)

Merdeka Stadium, Kuala Lumpur
Referee: S. Hayakawa (Japan)

8 August 1960

Indonesia	8–3	Singapore
Timisela 27', 28', 46', 49'; Soehendar 38', 75'; Tee San Liong 53', 80'		Quah Kim Swee 20', 56'; Hassan 67'

Merdeka Stadium, Kuala Lumpur
Referee: Boonsong Sam La-Or (Thailand)
8 August 1960

South Korea	3–1	Hong Kong
Yoo Pan-soon 41'; Woo Sang-kwon 60'; Yoo Gwang-jun 64' (pen.)		Lau Chi-lam 9'

Merdeka Stadium, Kuala Lumpur
Referee: Haji Ibrahim (Malaya)

10 August 1960

South Korea	0–0	South Vietnam

Merdeka Stadium, Kuala Lumpur

11 August 1960

South Korea	3–3	Singapore
Woo Sang-kwon 11', 69'; Moon Jung-sik 76'		Sahar 20', 61'; Ibrahim 57'

Merdeka Stadium, Kuala Lumpur
Referee: T. Nadarajah (Malaya)
11 August 1960

Indonesia	3–1	Hong Kong
14'; Sian Liong 33'; Suhendar 52'	Report	Ho Cheng Yau 64'

Merdeka Stadium, Kuala Lumpur
Referee: S. Hayakawa (Japan)

13 August 1960

Hong Kong	3–2	Singapore
Lee Tak Wai 12'; Lau Chi Lam 27'; Samad Abdullah 50' (o.g.)	Report	Toth 30'; Rahim 90' (pen.)

Merdeka Stadium, Kuala Lumpur
13 August 1960

Indonesia	5–3	South Vietnam
Suratmo 6' (pen.), 53'; Tee San Liong 22'; Timisela 60', 76'		Trần Văn Đôn 31'; Lâm Văn Bốn 51'; Tạ Vinh Trạch 67'

Merdeka Stadium, Kuala Lumpur

=== Group B ===
Team	Pld	W	D	L	GF	GA	GD	Pts
Malaya	3	3	0	0	12	2	+10	6
Pakistan	3	2	0	1	10	2	+8	4
Japan B (Note: Japan did not send their main national team, which departed for a European tour at the same time.)	3	1	0	2	4	7	−3	2
Thailand	3	0	0	3	3	18	−15	0

5 August 1960

Malaya	3–0	Japan B
Ghani 33', 60'; Arthur 69'	Report

Merdeka Stadium, Kuala Lumpur
Referee: Lee Pak Jong (South Korea)
5 August 1960

Pakistan	7–0	Thailand
Moosa 16', 70', 72'; Umer 31', 35'; Changezi 33' (pen.); Jehan 78'	Report

Merdeka Stadium, Kuala Lumpur
Referee: Hong Deok-young (South Korea)

7 August 1960

Malaya	8–2	Thailand
Ghani 14', 24', 50'; Choe 37', 41', 59'; Arthur 66'; Gabrielle 68'	Report	Prathet 13', 75' (pen.)

Merdeka Stadium, Kuala Lumpur
Referee: Mak Yeung Fai (Hong Kong)

10 August 1960

Pakistan	3–1	Japan B
Moosa 46'; Sugiyama 70' (o.g.); Jehan 75'	Report	Miyamoto 11'

Merdeka Stadium, Kuala Lumpur
Referee: Mak Yeung Fai (Hong Kong)

12 August 1960

Japan B	3–1	Thailand
Miyamoto (?); Sugiyama (?); Oshima (?)	Report	Phakdiphol (?)

Merdeka Stadium, Kuala Lumpur
12 August 1960

Malaya	1–0	Pakistan
Gabrielle 60'	Report

Merdeka Stadium, Kuala Lumpur

== Third place play-off ==
14 August 1960

Indonesia	4–0	Pakistan
Suratmo 51' (pen.), 69', 73'; Timisela 64'	Report

Merdeka Stadium, Kuala Lumpur

== Final ==
14 August 1960

Malaya	0–0	South Korea
	Report

Merdeka Stadium, Kuala Lumpur
Referee: Bahadur Khan (Pakistan)

== Squads ==
Players sorted by jersey numbers.

=== Malaya ===
Head coach:

No.	Pos.	Player	Date of birth (age)	Caps	Club
1		Sexton Lourdes	1931 (aged 29)		Selangor FA
2		Yee Seng Choy			Selangor FA
3		Ng Mun Keal			Selangor FA
4		Mok Wai Hong			Negeri Sembilan FA
5		Pang Siang Teik			Penang FA
6		Edwin C. Dutton (captain)	30 March 1928 (aged 32)		Selangor FA
7		Govindarajoo			Selangor FA
8		Arthur Koh	1936 (aged 24)		Selangor FA
9		Robert Choe	13 January 1940 (aged 20)		Malacca FA
10		Abdul Ghani Minhat	23 November 1935 (aged 24)		Selangor FA
11		Stanley Gabrielle			Selangor FA
12		Abdullah Yeop Noordin	7 March 1941 (aged 19)		Selangor FA
13		Wong Kim Seng			Perak FA
14		Nordin			Armed Forces FA
15		M. Joseph	1934 (age 26)		Negeri Sembilan FA
16		Ng Boon Bee	17 December 1937 (aged 22)		Perak FA
17		P.A. Gunasegaran			Perak FA
18		Teh Cheng Lee			Selangor FA

=== Japan B ===
Head coach:

No.	Pos.	Player	Date of birth (age)	Caps	Club
1		Tsukasa Hosaka	3 March 1937 (aged 23)		
2		N. Nishigaki			
3		Mitsuo Kamata	16 December 1937 (aged 22)		
4		Seishiro Shimatani	6 November 1938 (aged 21)		
5		Y. Yoshida			
6		H. Sato			
7		H. Suzuki			
8		Kosaku Sugimura	8 August 1936 (aged 23)		
9		M. Mukoyama			
10		Hiroshi Saeki	26 May 1936 (aged 24)		
11		J. Ando			
12		S. Chida			
13		O. Kanda			
14		Teruki Miyamoto	26 December 1940 (aged 19)		
15		H. Oshima			
16		Ryūichi Sugiyama	4 July 1941 (aged 19)		

=== Pakistan ===
Head coach: (Pakistan) Sheikh Shaheb Ali

No.	Pos.	Player	Date of birth (age)	Caps	Club
1	GK	Muhammad Siddiq			(Pakistan) Balochistan
12	GK	Ghulam Hussain			(Pakistan) Karachi
2	DF	Muhammad Irshad			Pakistan Army
3	DF	Qayyum Changezi (captain)			(Pakistan) Balochistan
13	DF	Niamat Ullah Durrani			(Pakistan) Punjab
4	MF	Abid Hussain Ghazi			(Pakistan) Karachi
5	MF	Masood ul Hassan Butt			(Pakistan) Punjab
6	MF	Abdul Ghafoor			(Pakistan) Karachi
14	MF	Hussain Killer			(Pakistan) Karachi
15	MF	Ghulam Sabir			Pakistan Railways
7	FW	Ghulam Rabbani			East Pakistan
8	FW	Kabir Ahmed			East Pakistan
9	FW	Muhammad Umer			(Pakistan) Karachi
10	FW	Abdullah Rahi			East Pakistan
11	FW	Moosa Ghazi			(Pakistan) Karachi
16	FW	M.N. Jehan			(Pakistan) Punjab
17	FW	Muhammad Haroon			(Pakistan) Karachi

=== Thailand ===
Head coach:

No.	Pos.	Player	Date of birth (age)	Caps	Club
1		Lek Amaruktanond			
2		Suebswasdi Chanvicha-Sena			
3		Suraphol Chaicharoen			
4		Suphot Phanich			
5		Luen Phan-Ngam			
6		Asdang Phanikbutr			
7		Vichit Yam-Boonruang			
8		Prakob Rasmee-Mala			
9		Pipop Singh-Tongvan			
10		Suchat Mutukan			
11		Tonglor Jaroendej			
12		Yanyong Nilpirom			
13		Sanong Phakdiphol			
14		Parroj Vanichaka			
15		Prathet Sutabutr			
16		Swang Changchuen			
17		Prasith Chaya-Taveep			

=== Hong Kong ===
Head coach:

No.	Pos.	Player	Date of birth (age)	Caps	Club
1		Wong Shau Wo			
2		Seto You			
3		Lee Kwoh Wah			
4		J.H. Toledo			
5		Kung Wah Kit			
6		Chan Chi Kong			
7		Au Pang Nin			
8		Lau Chi Lam			
9		Lau Kai Chiu			
10		Ho Cheng Yau (captain)	1933 (aged 27)		
11		Leung Wai Hung			
12		Kwok Chow Ming			
13		Ng Tim Loy			
14		Lok Tak Hing			
15		Tse Ping Kung			
16		Fung Kee Wan			
17		Lee Tak Wai			

=== South Vietnam ===
Head coach:

No.	Pos.	Player	Date of birth (age)	Caps	Club
1		Duc			
2		Ngoc			
3		Ti			
4		Cut			
5		Ty			
6		Hiew			
7		Ho Tu Myo			
8		Thanh			
9		Bon			
10		Lang			
11		Manh			
12		Ha-Tam ti Ha			
13		Cam			
14		Nhung			
15		Don Tu Kane			
16		Thach			
17		Vinh			
18		Ron			
18		Ngau			

=== South Korea ===
Head coach:

No.	Pos.	Player	Date of birth (age)	Caps	Club
1		Ham Heung-chul	17 November 1930 (aged 29)		
2		Pak Sang Hoon			
3		Kim Chong Seark			
4		Kim Hong-bok	4 March 1935 (aged 25)		
5		Sim Keun Taik			
6		Son Myung Sup			
7		Yoo Kwan Jun			
8		Kim Chan-ki	30 December 1931 (aged 28)		
9		Oum Kyun Jin			
10		Yoo Pan Soon			
11		Moon Jung-sik	23 June 1930 (aged 30)		
12		Cha Tae-sung	8 October 1934 (aged 25)		
13		Woo Sang-kwon	2 February 1926 (aged 34)		
14		Choi Chung-min	30 August 1930 (aged 29)		
15		Pak Kyung Hwa			
16		Yoo Chung Suk			
17		Chung Soon Chun			

=== Indonesia ===
Head coach:

No.	Pos.	Player	Date of birth (age)	Caps	Club
1		Joe Etek			
4		Phwa Sian Liong	26 January 1931 (aged 29)		
5		Il Jas			
6		Sanpara			
7		Fattah Hidajat			
8		Idris Mapakaja			
9		Rukma Sudjana			
10		Zulkifli			
12		Omo Suratmo	11 February 1931 (aged 29)		
13		Manan			
14		Piet Timisela			
15		Isak Udin			
16		Henky Timisela	22 November 1937 (aged 22)		
17		Soenarto			
18		Muslim			
19		Hoesein			
20		Kaelani			
21		Suhendar			

=== Singapore ===
Head coach:

No.	Pos.	Player	Date of birth (age)	Caps	Club
1		Wilfred Skinner	31 May 1934 (aged 26)		
2		Lee Wah Chin			
3		Matmoon Sudasee			
4		M. Sutton			
5		Lee Kok Seng (captain)			
6		Osman Johan			
7		Ibrahim Hassan			
8		Rahim Omar	1934 (aged 26)		
9		Mahat Ambu			
10		Quah Kim Swee			
11		Ibrahim Mansoor			
12		Idros Albar			
13		Majid Ariff	2 June 1937 (aged 23)		
14		Ali Samijan			
15		Lazlo Toth			
16		Umar Rahmat			
17		Sahar Hussein			
18		Mokhtar Tabri			

== Post-tournament ==
After the conclusion of the tournament. The AFC conducted a trial match to form a proposed Asian All-Stars XI which was to tour Europe, which ultimately never materialised.

- Central Zone:

Duc (South Vietnam) and Sexton Lourdes (Malaya), Yee Seng Choy (Malaya), Cut (South Vietnam), Ti (South Vietnam), Bon (South Vietnam), Lee Kok Seng (Singapore), Fattah Hidajat (Singapore), Edwin C. Dutton (Malaya), Vichit Yam-Boonruang (Thailand), Stanley Gabrielle (Malaya), Abdul Ghani Minhat (Malaya), Vinh (South Vietnam), Ron (South Vietnam), Quah Kim Swee (Singapore), Phwa Sian Liong (Indonesia), Omo Suratmo (Indonesia), Suchat (Thailand)

- Eastern/Western Zone:

Pak Sang Hoon (South Korea), Tsukasa Hosaka (Japan), Sim Keun Taik (South Korea), Qayyum Changezi (Pakistan), Lee Kwoh Wah (Hong Kong), Oum Kyun Jin (South Korea), Kung Wah Kit (Hong Kong), Abid Hussain Ghazi (Pakistan), Hussain Killer (Pakistan), Hiroshi Saeki (Japan), Ghulam Rabbani (Pakistan, Lau Chi Lam (Hong Kong) Pak Kyung Hwa (South Korea), Chung Soon Chun (South Korea), Leung Wai Hung (Hong Kong), Ho Cheng Yau (Hong Kong), Ryūichi Sugiyama (Japan), Moosa Ghazi (Pakistan)
