= Football at the 1954 Asian Games – Men's team squads =

Squads for the Football at the 1954 Asian Games played in Manila, Philippines.

== Group A ==
=== Taiwan ===
Head coach: (Hong Kong) (Taiwan) Lee Wai Tong

No.	Pos.	Player	Date of birth (age)	Club
1	GK	Pau King-yin		
2	DF	Lau Yee		
3	DF	Hau Yung-sang		
5	DF	Ng Kee-cheung		
7	MF	Chan Fai-hung		
11	MF	King Loh-sung		
12	FW	Chu Wing-keung		
15	FW	Ho Ying-fan		
16	FW	Lee Tae-fai		
20	FW	Chu Chin-ching		
22	FW	Hsu Wei-po		
		Chou Wen-chi		
		Hau Ching-to		
		Li Chun-fat		
		Lo Ching-hsiang		
	FW	Mok Chun-wah		
		Szeto Man		
		Tang Sum		
		Teng Sheung		
		Tse Tsu-kuo		
		Yen Shih-hsin		
	FW	Yiu Cheuk-yin		

=== South Vietnam ===
Head coach: (South Vietnam)

No.	Pos.	Player	Date of birth (age)	Club
1	GK	Chau Ram Hon		
2	DF	Gon Rai Van		
3	DF	Hun Vo Fa		
4	MF	Nguyen Thai Hun		
5	DF	Nguyen Van Chu		
6	MF	Nguyen Van Mong		
7	FW	Ram Van Fan		
8	FW	Tah Do Toy		
9	FW	Vin Do Toy		
10	FW			
11	FW			
12	GK	Chau Lam Hong		
13	MF	Ram Van Hum Tan		
14	GK	Phạm Văn Rạng		
15				
16				
17				
18				

=== Philippines ===
Head coach: (Philippines) Dionisio Calvo

No.	Pos.	Player	Date of birth (age)	Club
	GK	Eddie Llamas		
	GK	Freddie Campos		
	GK	Victor Sison	December 1936 (aged 17)	
	DF	Rene Nieto		
	DF	Carlos Rebullida		
	DF	Carlos Calero		
	DF	Benjamin Benito		
	MF	Julio Garcia		
	MF	Fernando Álvarez	25 October 1925 (aged 28)	
	MF	Ramon Gonzales		
	MF	Jose Esteva		
	MF	Manuel Daude		
	MF	Emmanuel Bravo		
	FW	Eduardo Pacheco	4 January 1936 (aged 18)	
	FW	Benito Razon		
	FW	Alberto Villareal	1933 or 1934 (aged 19–21)	
	FW	Ramon Petierra		
	FW	Jose Estella		
	FW	Alfredo de Jesus		
	FW	Pocholo Manzano		
	FW	Rafael Ortigas Jr.		
	FW	Angel Heredia		

== Group B ==
=== Singapore ===
Head coach: (Singapore)

No.	Pos.	Player	Date of birth (age)	Club
	GK	Wilfred Skinner	31 May 1934 (aged 19)	
2	DF	Lee Kok Seng		
3	DF	Soh Teow Keng		
4	MF	Ho Hing Weng		
5	DF			
	MF	Chia Boon Leong		
	FW	Rahim Omar	1934 (aged 20)	(Football Association of Singapore) Star Soccerites
	FW	Awang Bakar	1930 (aged 24)	(Football Association of Singapore) Singapore FA
	FW	Pang Siang Hock		(Football Association of Malaysia) Penang FA
10	FW			
11	FW			
12	MF	Aw Boon Seong		
13				
14				
15				
16				
17				
18				

=== Pakistan ===
Manager: (Pakistan) Khawaja Riaz Ahmed

No.	Pos.	Player	Date of birth (age)	Club
	GK	Shamoo Abdul Ghani		(Pakistan Football Federation) Karachi
	GK	Mazhar Siddique		(Pakistan Football Federation) Pakistan Army
	DF	Sheikh Shaheb Ali	1 July 1915 (aged 38)	(Pakistan Football Federation) Fire Service AC
	DF	Nabi Chowdhury	1934 (aged 20)	(Pakistan Football Federation) Dhaka Wanderers
	DF	Riasat Ali		(Pakistan Football Federation) Punjab
	DF	Abdul Haq		(Pakistan Football Federation) Punjab
	DF	Muhammad Abdul Malik		(Pakistan Football Federation) Punjab
	MF	Sumbal Khan	1926 (aged 28)	(Pakistan Football Federation) NWFP
	MF	Niaz Ali	1924 (aged (30)	(Pakistan Football Federation) Punjab
	MF	Taj Mohammad Jr.		(Pakistan Football Federation) Balochistan
	MF	Ahmed Ali Phullo (Vice-captain)		(Pakistan Football Federation) Balochistan
	MF	Afzal Khan		(Pakistan Football Federation) Karachi
	FW	Masood Fakhri	16 September 1932 (aged 21)	(All India Football Federation) East Bengal Club
	FW	Muhammad Amin	1931 (aged 23)	(Pakistan Football Federation) Pakistan Air Force
	FW	Moideen Kutty (Captain)	2 January 1926 (aged 28)	(Pakistan Football Federation) Pakistan Air Force
	FW	Jamil Akhtar	1930 (aged 24)	(Pakistan Football Federation) Pakistan Railways
	FW	Muhammad Sharif		(Pakistan Football Federation) Punjab
	FW	Ibrahim		(Pakistan Football Federation) Karachi
	FW	Rashid Chunna		(Pakistan Football Federation) Dacca

=== Burma ===
Head coach: (Myanmar)

No.	Pos.	Player	Date of birth (age)	Club
	GK	Seaton Aukim		
	GK	Hla Maung		
	DF	Tun Aung		
	DF	Sein Myint		
	MF	Perry Dwe		
	MF	Ba Kyu		
	MF	Ronny D' Mello		
	MF	Tin Kyi		
	MF	Robert Yin Gyaw		
	FW	Kyaw Zaw		
	FW	Douglas Steward		
	FW	Gordon Samuel	1922 (aged 32)	
	FW	Htoowa Dwe		
	FW	Suk Bahadur		
	FW	Sein Pe		
	FW	Pe Khin		
		Maung Aung		
		Thein Aung		
		Pe Myint		

== Group C ==
=== Japan ===
Head coach: (Japan) Shigemaru Takenokoshi

No.	Pos.	Player	Date of birth (age)	Club
	GK	Hiroto Muraoka	19 September 1931 (aged 22)	(Japan Football Association) Kyodai Club
	GK	Hidemaro Watanabe	24 September 1924 (aged 29)	(Japan Football Association) Chugoku Electric Power
	DF	Ryuzo Hiraki	7 October 1931 (aged 22)	(Japan Football Association) Kwansei Gakuin University
	DF	Yoshio Okada	11 August 1926 (aged 27)	(Japan Football Association) Rokko Club
	DF	Nobuo Matsunaga	06 December 1921 (aged 32)	(Japan Football Association) Nippon Light Metal
	DF	Hiroyuki Doida		
	MF	Takashi Takabayashi	02 August 1931 (aged 22)	(Japan Football Association) Tanabe Pharmaceutical
	MF	Arawa Kimura	08 July 1931 (aged 22)	(Japan Football Association) Kwangaku Club
	MF	Shigeo Sugimoto	04 December 1926 (aged 27)	(Japan Football Association) Hankyu Railways SC
	MF	Masao Ono	02 March 1923 (aged 31)	(Japan Football Association) Nissan Chemical SC
	FW	Masanori Tokita	24 June 1925 (aged 28)	(Japan Football Association) Tanabe Pharmaceutical
	FW	Taro Kagawa	09 August 1922 (aged 31)	(Japan Football Association) Osaka SC
	FW	Taizo Kawamoto	17 January 1914 (aged 40)	(Japan Football Association) Osaka SC
	FW	Toshio Iwatani	24 October 1925 (aged 28)	(Japan Football Association) Osaka SC
	FW	Takashi Kano	31 October 1920 (aged 32)	(Japan Football Association) Waseda WMW
	FW	Hirokazu Ninomiya	22 November 1917 (aged 36)	(Japan Football Association) Keio BRB
	FW	Ken Naganuma	05 September 1930 (aged 23)	(Japan Football Association) Furukawa Electric
	FW	Takashi Tokuhiro	28 April 1931 (aged 23)	(Japan Football Association) Yuasa Batteries

=== Indonesia ===
Head coach: (Socialist Federal Republic of Yugoslavia) Antun Pogačnik

No.	Pos.	Player	Date of birth (age)	Club
1	GK	Parengkuan		(Football Association of Indonesia) Persija Jakarta
12	GK	Mursanjoto		(Football Association of Indonesia) Persema Malang
2	DF	Chaeruddin Siregar	7 August 1929 (aged 24)	(Football Association of Indonesia) Persija Jakarta
3	DF	Anas Wiradikarta		(Football Association of Indonesia) Persib Bandung
4	DF	Kwee Kiat Sek	11 January 1934 (aged 20)	(Football Association of Indonesia) Persib Bandung
5	DF	Ong Liong Tik		(Football Association of Indonesia) Persija Jakarta
6	MF	Tan Liong Houw	26 July 1930 (aged 23)	(Football Association of Indonesia) Persija Jakarta
7	MF	Ramlan Yatim	10 September 1922 (aged 32)	(Football Association of Indonesia) PSMS Medan
8	MF	Mohammad Sidhi		(Football Association of Indonesia) Persebaya Surabaya
9	FW	Phwa Sian Liong	26 January 1931 (aged 23)	(Football Association of Indonesia) Persebaya Surabaya
10	FW	Jusuf Siregar	28 August 1928 (aged 25)	(Football Association of Indonesia) PSMS Medan
11	FW	Djamiat Dhalhar	25 November 1927 (aged 26)	(Football Association of Indonesia) Persija Jakarta
13	FW	Ramang	24 April 1928 (aged 26)	(Football Association of Indonesia) PSM Makassar
14	FW	Tee San Liong	3 January 1922 (aged 32)	(Football Association of Indonesia) Persebaya Surabaya
15	FW	Aang Witarsa	3 December 1930 (aged 23)	(Football Association of Indonesia) Persib Bandung
16	FW	Soegiono	1922	(Football Association of Indonesia) PSIS Semarang

=== India ===
Head coach: (India) Balaidas Chatterjee

No.	Pos.	Player	Date of birth (age)	Club
	GK	Sanjeeva Uchil		(All India Football Federation) Bombay
	GK	Sanat Sett		(All India Football Federation) Bengal
	DF	Sailen Manna (c)	1 September 1924 (aged 29)	(All India Football Federation) Mohun Bagan
	DF	Sayed Khwaja Aziz-ud-Din	12 July 1930 (aged 23)	(All India Football Federation) Hyderabad City Police
	DF	Thenmadom Varghese		(All India Football Federation) Bombay
	DF	Anthony Patrick		(All India Football Federation) Hyderabad City Police
	MF	Noor Muhammad		(All India Football Federation) Hyderabad City Police
	MF	Chandan Singh Rawat	26 July 1928 (aged 25)	(All India Football Federation) Bengal
	MF	Amal Dutta	26 July 1928 (aged 25)	(All India Football Federation) Bengal
	MF	G.R. Gokul		(All India Football Federation) Bengal
	FW	Sayed Moinuddin		(All India Football Federation) Hyderabad City Police
	FW	Ahmed Khan	24 December 1926 (aged 27)	(All India Football Federation) Hyderabad
	FW	Joe D'Sa	3 August 1932 (aged 21)	(All India Football Federation) Bombay
	FW	Krishna Kittu		(All India Football Federation) Bengal
	FW	Anthony Braganza		(All India Football Federation) Bombay
	FW	M. Jayaram		(All India Football Federation) Services
	FW	Thangarajan		(All India Football Federation) Madras

== Group D ==
=== South Korea ===
Head coach: (South Korea) Lee Yoo-hyung

No.	Pos.	Player	Date of birth (age)	Club
1	GK	Hong Deok-young	5 May 1926 (aged 27)	(Korea Football Association) Chosun Textile Company FC
2	GK	Ham Heung-chul	17 November 1930 (aged 23)	(Korea Football Association) ROK Army Military Police Command FC
3	DF	Park Kyu-chung	11 June 1924 (aged 29)	(Korea Football Association) ROK Army Quartermaster Corps FC
4	DF	Li Jong-kap	18 March 1920 (aged 33)	(Korea Football Association) ROK Army CIC FC
5	MF	Lee Sang-yi	18 March 1920 (aged 33)	(Korea Football Association) Chosun Textile Company FC
6	MF	Kim Ji-sung	7 November 1924 (aged 29)	(Korea Football Association) ROK Army CIC FC
7	MF	Kang Chang-gi	28 August 1927 (aged 26)	(Korea Football Association) Chosun Textile Company FC
8	MF	Han Chang-wha	3 January 1922 (aged 32)	(Korea Football Association) ROK Army CIC FC
9	FW	Chu Yung-kwang	12 January 1920 (aged 33)	(Korea Football Association) ROK Navy FC
10	FW	Choi Chung-min	27 July 1927 (aged 26)	(Korea Football Association) ROK Army CIC FC
11	FW	Sung Nak-woon	2 February 1926 (aged 27)	(Korea Football Association) ROK Army Quartermaster Corps FC
12	FW	Choi Kwang-seok	27 March 1932 (aged 21)	(Korea Football Association) Chosun Textile Company FC
13	FW	Chung Nam-sik	16 February 1917 (aged 36)	(Korea Football Association) ROK Army HID FC
14	FW	Park Il-kap	21 March 1926 (aged 27)	(Korea Football Association) ROK Army CIC FC
15	DF	Min Byung-dae	20 February 1918 (aged 35)	(Korea Football Association) ROK Army CIC FC
16	FW	Chung Kook-chin	2 January 1917 (aged 37)	(Korea Football Association) ROK Navy FC

=== Hong Kong ===
Head coach: (Scotland) Tom Sneddon

No.	Pos.	Player	Date of birth (age)	Club
	GK	Cheung Kwun Hing		
		Wai Fat Kim		
		Lee Bing Chiu		
		Szeto Yiu		
		Luk Tat Hay		
		Lau Chi Bing		
		Ko Po Keung		
		Santos		
		Chan Chi Kong		
		Chu Wing Wah		
		Tang Yi Kit		
		Lo Kan Chuen		
		Lau Kai Chiu		
		Au Chi Yin		
		Ho Cheung Yau		
		Hung Hing Yuk		
		Lee Yuk Tak		
		Sit Pu Yin		
		Tse Kam Ho		

Hong Kong national team and Republic of China national team shared same fodder of players during pre-1971. Most (if not all) the players playing in the Hong Kong football league. The ROC team practically the A-team, while Hong Kong practically the B-team, with lesser quality of players.

=== Afghanistan ===
Head coach: (Afghanistan)

No.	Pos.	Player	Date of birth (age)	Club
1	GK	Abdul Ghafoor Assar		
2	DF	Atta Mohammad		
3	DF	Abdul Ghafoor Yusufzai		
4	MF	Hamid Afzal		
5	DF	Hamid Yusufzai		
6	MF	Rahman Jahangir		
7	MF	Tar Mohammed Barakzai		
8	MF	Khalil Ullah		
9	FW	Sarwar Ayubi		
10	FW	Farid		
11	FW	Anwar Quahdari		
12	GK			
13	DF			
14	MF			
15	FW			
16	MF			
17	FW			
18	FW			
