= Singapore national football team results (1948–1969) =

- Win Draw Loss

This article provides details of international football games played by the Singapore national football team from 1948 to 1969.

== Acronyms ==
Acronyms	Full Name
WC	FIFA World Cup
AFC	Asian Football Federation
AFF	ASEAN Football Federation
Q	Qualification rounds
PO	Play-off round
GS	Group stage
R32	Round of 32
R16	Round of 16
QF	Quarter-finals
SF	Semi-finals
3rd PO	Third place match/play-off
F	Final

== Results ==
=== 1948 ===
22 May 1948 Friendly	Singapore	1–0	China	Singapore

20 June 1948 Friendly	Singapore	4–2	Malaya	Singapore

7 July 1948 Friendly	Singapore	3–4	China	Singapore

=== 1950 ===
23 February 1950 Friendly	Singapore	5–1	Burma	Singapore

27 February 1950 Friendly	Singapore	0–6	Burma	Singapore

=== 1953 ===
24 January 1953 Friendly tournament	Hong Kong	2–2	Singapore	Hong Kong

25 January 1953 Friendly tournament	Hong Kong	3–0	Singapore	Hong Kong

31 January 1953 Friendly	Philippines	0–4	Singapore	Philippines

19 April 1953 Friendly	Singapore	1–3	South Korea	Singapore

20 June 1953 Friendly	Singapore	3–1	Philippines	Singapore

13 September 1953 Friendly	Singapore	1–3	Malaya	Singapore

=== 1954 ===
17 April 1954 Friendly	Singapore	2–0	Hong Kong	Singapore

25 April 1954 Friendly	Singapore	2–2	Pakistan	Singapore

2 May 1954 1954 Asian Games	Pakistan	6–2	Singapore	Philippines

4 May 1954 1954 Asian Games	Burma	1–1	Singapore	Philippines

=== 1956 ===
9 September 1956 Friendly	Singapore	1–1	Pakistan	Singapore

13 December 1956 Friendly	Singapore	2–10	Bulgaria	Singapore

=== 1957 ===
9 February 1957 Friendly	Singapore	2–3	India	Singapore

11 May 1957 Friendly	Singapore	1–1	Malaya	Singapore

31 August 1957 Merdeka Tournament	Singapore	5–5	South Vietnam	Malaya

1 September 1957 Merdeka Tournament	South Vietnam	2–1	Singapore	Malaya

3 September 1957 Merdeka Tournament	Singapore	6–0	Thailand	Malaya

5 September 1957 Merdeka Tournament	Cambodia	1–1	Singapore	Malaya

7 September 1957 Merdeka Tournament	Singapore	3–2	Burma	Malaya

10 September 1957 Friendly	Singapore	2–1	Burma	Singapore

=== 1958 ===
1 March 1958 Friendly	Malaya	5–2	Singapore	Malaya

2 March 1958 Friendly	Malaya	3–1	Singapore	Malaya

19 April 1958 Friendly	Singapore	1–3	Hong Kong	Singapore

23 April 1958 Friendly	Singapore	1–4	Hong Kong	Singapore

3 May 1958 Friendly	Singapore	3–3	Malaya	Singapore

4 May 1958 Friendly	Singapore	0–3	Malaya	Singapore

17 May 1958 Friendly	Singapore	4–4	Pakistan	Singapore

26 May 1958 1958 Asian Games	South Korea	2–1	Singapore	Japan

28 May 1958 1958 Asian Games	Israel	2–1	Singapore	Japan

2 July 1958 Friendly	Singapore	0–5	Indonesia	Singapore

30 August 1958 Merdeka Tournament	Singapore	4–4	South Vietnam	Malaya

31 August 1958 Merdeka Tournament	Indonesia	2–0	Singapore	Malaya

2 September 1958 Merdeka Tournament	Malaya	0–0	Singapore	Malaya

3 September 1958 Merdeka Tournament	Hong Kong	2–0	Singapore	Malaya

=== 1959 ===
10 January 1959 Friendly	Singapore	3–4	Japan	Singapore

11 January 1959 Friendly	Singapore	3–2	Japan	Singapore

9 May 1959 1960 AFC Asian Cup qualification	Singapore	1–4	South Vietnam	Singapore

11 May 1959 1960 AFC Asian Cup qualification	Singapore	2–5	Malaya	Singapore

31 August 1959 Merdeka Tournament	India	2–0	Singapore	Malaya

2 September 1959 Merdeka Tournament	South Korea	4–1	Singapore	Malaya

3 September 1959 Merdeka Tournament	Japan	4–1	Singapore	Malaya

11 September 1959 Friendly tournament	Singapore	2–3	India	Singapore

13 September 1959 Friendly tournament	Singapore	0–4	South Korea	Singapore

=== 1960 ===
5 May 1960 Friendly	Singapore	3–0	India	Malaya

7 August 1960 Merdeka Tournament	South Vietnam	2–1	Singapore	Malaya

8 August 1960 Merdeka Tournament	Indonesia	8–3	Singapore	Malaya

11 August 1960 Merdeka Tournament	Singapore	3–3	South Korea	Malaya

13 August 1960 Merdeka Tournament	Hong Kong	3–2	Singapore	Malaya

19 August 1960 Friendly	Singapore	4–1	Pakistan	Singapore

=== 1961 ===
2 August 1961 Merdeka Tournament	Indonesia	1–0	Singapore	Malaya

10 August 1961 Merdeka Tournament	Singapore	4–3	Hong Kong	Malaya

12 August 1961 Merdeka Tournament	Singapore	5–3	Thailand	Malaya

13 August 1961 Merdeka Tournament	South Vietnam	2–1	Singapore	Malaya

=== 1962 ===
27 July 1962 Friendly	Singapore	2–2	Taiwan	Singapore

28 July 1962 Friendly	Singapore	0–4	Taiwan	Singapore

16 August 1962 Friendly	Singapore	2–2	India	Singapore

22 August 1962 Friendly	Singapore	0–1	Taiwan	Singapore

5 September 1962 Friendly	Singapore	1–0	India	Singapore

11 September 1962 Merdeka Tournament	Indonesia	2–0	Singapore	Malaya

13 September 1962 Merdeka Tournament	Singapore	5–0	Philippines	Malaya

17 September 1962 Merdeka Tournament	Singapore	2–2	South Vietnam	Malaya

21 September 1962 Friendly	Singapore	2–1	Japan	Hong Kong

=== 1965 ===
31 August 1965 Friendly	Singapore	1–2	India	Singapore

5 December 1965 Friendly	Hong Kong	0–0	Singapore	Hong Kong

7 December 1965 Friendly	Hong Kong	1–2	Singapore	Hong Kong

15 December 1965 1965 Southeast Asian Peninsular Games	Burma	1–0	Singapore	Kuala Lumpur, Malaysia

16 December 1965 1965 Southeast Asian Peninsular Games	South Vietnam	5–1	Singapore	Kuala Lumpur, Malaysia

=== 1966 ===
13 August 1966 Merdeka Tournament	Burma	2–2	Singapore	Malaysia

18 August 1966 Merdeka Tournament	Singapore	4–1	Taiwan	Malaysia

20 August 1966 Merdeka Tournament	South Vietnam	2–1	Singapore	Malaysia

22 August 1966 Merdeka Tournament	Singapore	1–0	India	Malaysia

29 August 1966 Friendly	Singapore	2–2	South Vietnam	Singapore

31 August 1966 Friendly	Singapore	1–3	South Korea	Singapore

10 December 1966 1966 Asian Games	Indonesia	3–0	Singapore	Bangkok, Thailand

13 December 1966 1966 Asian Games	Singapore	3–3	Taiwan	Bangkok, Thailand

14 December 1966 1966 Asian Games	Singapore	5–0	South Vietnam	Bangkok, Thailand

15 December 1966 1966 Asian Games	Thailand	0–2	Singapore	Bangkok, Thailand

16 December 1966 1966 Asian Games	Japan	5–1	Singapore	Bangkok, Thailand

18 December 1966 1966 Asian Games	Burma	2–0	Singapore	Bangkok, Thailand

19 December 1966 1966 Asian Games	Japan	2–0	Singapore	Bangkok, Thailand

=== 1967 ===
24 March 1967 1968 Asian Cup qualifier	Malaysia	1–1	Singapore	Hong Kong

26 March 1967 1968 Asian Cup qualifier	Thailand	4–1	Singapore	Hong Kong

29 March 1967 1968 Asian Cup qualifier	Hong Kong	2–0	Singapore	Hong Kong

2 April 1967 1968 Asian Cup qualifier	South Vietnam	3–0	Singapore	Hong Kong

11 August 1967 Merdeka Tournament	Singapore	3–3	Taiwan	Malaysia

13 August 1967 Merdeka Tournament	Indonesia	4–1	Singapore	Malaysia

15 August 1967 Merdeka Tournament	Burma	3–0	Singapore	Malaysia

20 August 1967 Merdeka Tournament	South Korea	3–0	Singapore	Malaysia

28 August 1967 Friendly	Singapore	1–0	South Vietnam	Singapore

7 October 1967 Friendly	Singapore	4–0	Hong Kong	Singapore

8 October 1967 Friendly	Singapore	2–0	Hong Kong	Singapore

4 November 1967 1967 South Vietnam Independence Cup	South Vietnam	2–0	Singapore	Saigon, South Vietnam

8 November 1967 1967 South Vietnam Independence Cup	New Zealand	3–1	Singapore	Saigon, South Vietnam

11 November 1967 1967 South Vietnam Independence Cup	Australia	5–1	Singapore	Saigon, South Vietnam

21 November 1967 Friendly	Singapore	1–6	Australia	Singapore

=== 1968 ===
11 August 1968 Merdeka Tournament	Taiwan	2–0	Singapore	Malaysia

12 August 1968 Merdeka Tournament	South Korea	3–2	Singapore	Malaysia

15 August 1968 Merdeka Tournament	Indonesia	4–0	Singapore	Malaysia

27 August 1968 1968 Singapore Festival	Singapore	4–3	South Korea	Singapore
		Report

28 August 1968 1968 Singapore Festival	Singapore	1–0	South Vietnam	Singapore
		Report

30 August 1968 1968 Singapore Festival	Singapore	1–0	Indonesia	Singapore
		Report

20 November 1968 1968 King's Cup	Thailand	3–0	Singapore	Bangkok, Thailand

22 November 1968 1968 King's Cup	Burma	2–0	Singapore	Bangkok, Thailand

26 November 1968 1968 King's Cup	Indonesia	7–1	Singapore	Bangkok, Thailand

=== 1969 ===
16 September 1969 Friendly	Singapore	0–2	New Zealand	Singapore

20 October 1969 Friendly	Singapore	1–1	Cambodia	Singapore

31 October 1969 Merdeka Tournament	Burma	3–1	Singapore	Malaysia

4 November 1969 Merdeka Tournament	Indonesia	3–0	Singapore	Malaysia

6 November 1969 Merdeka Tournament	Indonesia	9–2	Singapore	Malaysia

9 November 1969 Merdeka Tournament	Burma	9–0	Singapore	Malaysia

11 November 1969 Friendly	Singapore	7–3	India	Singapore

19 November 1969 1969 King's Cup	Indonesia	2–3	Singapore	Bangkok, Thailand
	Jacob Sihasale 13'; Abdul Kadir 50'		Quah Kim Swee 20', 23'; Rahmat bin Mohawar 62'

21 November 1969 1969 King's Cup	Western Australia	3–1	Singapore	Bangkok, Thailand
	M. McKinley 42'; M. Subeck 69', 72'		Quah Kim Lye 28'

23 November 1969 1969 King's Cup	Singapore	1–1	South Vietnam	Bangkok, Thailand
	Quah Kim Lye 30'		Nguyen Van Ngon 17'
