= Pang Siang Hock =

Malayan footballer

Personal information
- Position: Forward

Senior career*
Years	Team	Apps	(Gls)
1950s–1960s	Penang FA		
1962	Butterworth Chinese		

International career
1954	Singapore	2	(2)
1956–1958	Malaya	4+	(3+)
- * Club domestic league appearances and goals

Pang Siang Hock is a former footballer who played as a forward. He played for Penang FA, and represented both the Singapore and Malaya national teams.

== Club career ==
In April 1959, Pang scored a hat-trick in a 3–1 win against Melacca, to secure Penang the Malayan Chinese FA Cup. On 1 August 1959, he was suspended by the Football Association of Malaya for two years, after injuring a player in a match against Perak in the Malaya Cup, before inciting his team to walk off the pitch.

He made his return to football in 1962, in a friendly match against Singapore Joint Services on 23 January. However, he was suspended by the federation again on 4 March 1962, this time for three years, after being sent off in a regional match between Butterworth Chinese and Indian Youngsters in Province Wellesley following an on-field fight. However, in September 1963, he was recalled to Penang for the 1963 Malaya Cup final, where he scored in the 24th minute to make it 2–2, although Penang would lose 6–2 to Selangor.

In 2020, Pang was one of six former Penang players who's mural was painted outside of the club's stadium.

== International career ==
In 1954, Pang represented the Singapore national team at the 1954 Asian Games, scoring twice in a 6–2 defeat to Pakistan.

In 1956, he was called up to the Malaya national team for AFC Asian Cup qualification, where he scored twice against Cambodia and once against South Vietnam. The following year, he played for Malaya at the 1957 Merdeka Tournament. However, following the tournament, the Football Association of Malaya suspended him from the national team for a year, after he wasn't co-operative during the tournament, before returning to the national team for a match against South Korea in October 1958, after Rahim Omar was suspended for three months by the Football Association of Selangor.

== Personal life ==
His older brother, Pang Siang Teik, was also a footballer, who was also suspended from football for a year in August 1959, and later reduced to five months after an appeal.
