= Sexton Lourdes =

Malaysian footballer (born 1931)

Personal information
- Full name: Sexton Lourdes Doss
- Date of birth: 1931 (age 94–95)
- Place of birth: British Malaya
- Position: Goalkeeper

Senior career*
Years	Team	Apps	(Gls)
1953–1962	Selangor		

International career
1954–1962	Malaya		
- * Club domestic league appearances and goals

Sexton Lourdes (born 1931) is a Malayan footballer who played for Selangor and the Malaya national team as a goalkeeper.

== Career overview ==
Sexton began his career with Selangor FA in 1953 and retired in 1963.

Sexton was a part of the Malaya national team that played in the inaugural Pestabola Merdeka 1957. He also was a squad player for Malaya that captured the 1958, 1959 and 1960 Merdeka Tournament editions.

On 3 September 1962, he was a part of the Malaya team that won bronze medals in the 1962 Asian Games.

== Honours ==
Selangor

- Malaysia Cup: 1956, 1959, 1961, 1962

Malaya

- Merdeka Cup: 1958, 1959, 1960
- Sea Games: Gold medal 1961
- Asian Games: Bronze medal 1962
