= Edwin C. Dutton =

Malaysian footballer (1928–1985)

Edwin Dutton
Personal information
- Full name: Edwin C. Dutton
- Date of birth: 30 March 1928
- Place of birth: British Malaya
- Date of death: 25 May 1985 (aged 57)
- Position: Centre-back

Senior career*
Years	Team	Apps	(Gls)
1950–1962	Selangor		

International career
1953–1962	Malaya		
- * Club domestic league appearances and goals

Edwin C. Dutton (30 March 1928 – 25 May 1985) was a Malaysian footballer who played for Selangor and Malaya national team as a centre-back. Dutton died on 25 May 1985, at the age of 57.

== Career overview ==
Dutton start played as centre-back with Selangor FA between 1950 and 1962 and also former skipper for them.

Dutton was a part of the Malaya national team that play in the first ever edition, inaugural Pestabola Merdeka 1957. He also was a squad player for Malaya that captured the 1958, 1959 and 1960 Merdeka Tournament editions.

On 3 September 1962, he was a part of the Malaya player that winning bronze medals in the 1962 Asian Games.

== Honour ==
Selangor

- Malaysia Cup: 1948, 1956, 1959, 1961, 1962

Malaya

- Merdeka Cup: 1958, 1959, 1960
- Sea Games: Gold medal 1961
- Asian Games: Bronze medal 1962
