= Omo Suratmo =

Indonesian footballer (1935–1988)

Personal information
- Date of birth: 11 February 1935
- Place of birth: Subang, Dutch East Indies
- Date of death: 13 April 1988 (aged 53)
- Place of death: Bandung, Indonesia
- Position: Forward

Youth career
- IPPI Indramayu
- Bond Indramayu

Senior career*
Years	Team	Apps	(Gls)
1956–1967	Persib Bandung	54	(33)

International career
1957–1962	Indonesia	32	(21)

Managerial career
- 1975–1976: Persib Bandung
- 1976–1977: Persipura Jayapura
- 1977–1978: Warna Agung
- 1978–1979: Persebaya Surabaya
- 1979–1980: NIAC Mitra
- 1980–1981: Indonesia U19
- 1983–1987: Persib Bandung
- 1985–1987: Indonesia U16
Medal record
Men's football
Representing Indonesia
Asian Games
Bronze medal – third place	1958 Tokyo
- * Club domestic league appearances and goals

Omo Suratmo (11 February 1935 – 13 April 1988) was an Indonesian professional football player and manager, who played as a forward.

== Career statistics ==
=== International ===
Scores and results list Indonesia's goal tally first, score column indicates score after each Suratmo goal.

List of international goals scored by Omo Suratmo
No.	Date	Venue	Opponent	Score	Result	Competition
1	31 August 1957	Merdeka Stadium, Kuala Lumpur, Malaysia	Thailand	1–0	4–0	1957 Merdeka Tournament
2	31 August 1957	Merdeka Stadium, Kuala Lumpur, Malaysia	Thailand	2–0	4–0	1957 Merdeka Tournament
3	31 August 1957	Merdeka Stadium, Kuala Lumpur, Malaysia	Thailand	3–0	4–0	1957 Merdeka Tournament
4	31 August 1957	Merdeka Stadium, Kuala Lumpur, Malaysia	Thailand	4–0	4–0	1957 Merdeka Tournament
5	5 September 1957	Merdeka Stadium, Kuala Lumpur, Malaysia	South Vietnam	2–0	3–1	1957 Merdeka Tournament
6	13 May 1958	Rizal Memorial Stadium, Manila, Philippines	Philippines	1–0	3–0	Friendly
7	13 May 1958	Rizal Memorial Stadium, Manila, Philippines	Philippines	2–0	3–0	Friendly
8	1 June 1958	National Stadium, Tokyo, Japan	India	2–1	4–1	1958 Asian Games
9	2 July 1958	Jalan Besar Stadium, Kallang, Singapore	Singapore	1–0	5–0	Friendly
10	2 July 1958	Jalan Besar Stadium, Kallang, Singapore	Singapore	3–0	5–0	Friendly
11	2 July 1958	Jalan Besar Stadium, Kallang, Singapore	Singapore	5–0	5–0	Friendly
12	3 July 1958	Jalan Besar Stadium, Kallang, Singapore	Malaya	1–2	4–2	Friendly
13	3 July 1958	Jalan Besar Stadium, Kallang, Singapore	Malaya	3–2	4–2	Friendly
14	14 April 1960	Calcutta, India	India	1–0	2–4	1960 Summer Olympics qualification
15	13 August 1960	Merdeka Stadium, Kuala Lumpur, Malaysia	South Vietnam	1–0	5–3	1960 Merdeka Tournament
16	14 August 1960	Merdeka Stadium, Kuala Lumpur, Malaysia	Pakistan	1–0	4–0	1960 Merdeka Tournament
17	14 August 1960	Merdeka Stadium, Kuala Lumpur, Malaysia	Pakistan	3–0	4–0	1960 Merdeka Tournament
18	14 August 1960	Merdeka Stadium, Kuala Lumpur, Malaysia	Pakistan	4–0	4–0	1960 Merdeka Tournament
19	15 August 1961	Jalan Besar Stadium, Kallang, Singapore	Japan	1–0	2–0	Friendly
20	21 August 1960	Ikada Stadium, Jakarta, Indonesia	Pakistan	3–1	5–2	Friendly
21	21 August 1960	Ikada Stadium, Jakarta, Indonesia	Pakistan	4–1	5–2	Friendly

== See also ==
Indonesia national under-17 football team

== Honours ==
=== Player ===
Persib Bandung

- Perserikatan: 1959–61

Indonesia

- Merdeka Tournament: 1961
- Asian Games (bronze) Bronze medal: 1958

=== Manager ===
Persipura Jayapura

- Soeharto Cup: 1976

Persib Bandung

- Perserikatan runner-up: 1983
