= Wilfred Skinner =

Singaporean footballer and field hockey player

Wilfred James Skinner, PPA (31 May 1934 – 2 August 2003) was a Singaporean athlete who represented Singapore in football and field hockey.

Skinner was best known as a goalkeeper for the Singapore national football team. At club level, he also played as a forward in addition to his goalkeeping duties for Police Sports Association. He won the 1954 SAFA Challenge Cup with his first club, Rovers Sports Club, and the 1969 President's Cup with Police. Skinner also represented the Singapore state team which participated in Malayan competitions and was part of the Malaya Cup winning teams of 1960, 1964 and 1965. He is widely considered as one of the best goalkeepers to play for Singapore. In a list of Singapore's 50 Greatest Athletes of the Century by The Straits Times in 1999, he was ranked 32nd and was the only goalkeeper in the list.

Skinner also represented Police and the Singapore state team in field hockey. He won the 1957 Oehlers Cup and the 1958 Singapore Hockey Association Division One title with Police. At state level, he established himself as a centre-half for Singapore and was national team skipper in the early 1960s and at the 1962 Asian Games. Skinner won the Razak Cup, the Malayan inter-state competition, with Singapore in 1965.

Skinner joined the Police Force after leaving school and rose to the rank of Deputy Superintendent. On 18 July 1974, Skinner was awarded the bronze Pingat Pentadbiran Awam state medal. After 20 years of service in the Police Force, Skinner resigned in late 1974 and emigrated to Canada.

In 2003, he had a heart attack and entered into a coma for two weeks. He died at the age of 69 on 2 August 2003.

== Football career ==
Wilfred Skinner
Personal information
- Full name: Wilfred James Skinner
- Date of birth: 31 May 1934
- Place of birth: Singapore
- Date of death: 2 August 2003 (aged 69)
- Place of death: Vancouver, British Columbia, Canada
- Positions: Goalkeeper; forward

Youth career
- 1951: Rovers SC

Senior career*
Years	Team	Apps	(Gls)
1952–1953	Rovers 'A'		
1953–1954	Rovers SC		
1954–1967	Singapore FA		
1955–1972	Police SA		

International career
1953–1967	Singapore		
1963–1964	Malaysia		
- * Club domestic league appearances and goals

=== Early years ===
Skinner represented Saint Andrew's School in football, hockey and cricket. He grew up near the beach in Kakikal Lane, Katong and would practise diving after imaginary balls on the beach in the mornings and evenings. He played bare-footed for Katong Boys' Club which won the 1950 Singapore Boys' Football Cup. The Cup win earned Skinner a pair of boots and a place in Saint Andrew's second football team, where he played as a right winger. He had to play in goal after the team's goalkeeper did not turn up for a match, and his performance earned him promotion to the first team after only two games with the second team. He also represented the Combined Schools team for five years under honorary coach Choo Seng Quee. He was awarded Combined Schools Colours in 1952, 1953 and 1954.

=== Club ===
Skinner joined Rovers Sports Club's newly formed junior team in 1951. A year later, he played for Rovers 'A', the second team, which ended runners-up in the 1952 SAFA Third Division. On 2 May 1953, Skinner made his senior debut for Rovers in a 3–0 win over Pulau Brani United in the First Division. Rovers finished as 1953 First Division runners-up and 1954 SAFA Challenge Cup winners

In December 1954, Skinner joined the Police Force and played for Police Sports Association after leaving school. He was also utilised in a centre or wide forward role throughout his playing career with Police. Skinner won the inaugural President's Cup under coach Choo Seng Quee in January 1969.

Skinner also represented the Singapore state team which participated in Malayan competitions including the Malaya Cup. On 26 June 1960, Skinner received an ovation from the 12,350-strong Jalan Besar crowd for his role in Singapore's 2–1 victory over Malaya Cup holders Selangor; he considered this win to be his most memorable match in a 1988 interview. Singapore went on to lift the Cup that year. In November 1960, SAFA president Soh Ghee Soon confirmed that Skinner "requested" his withdrawal from the Singapore team that would tour Hong Kong and Saigon as he could not train with the team due to his hockey commitments. Skinner quit the Malaya Cup team after he alleged he was unfairly dropped by Soh. He resolved his differences with the SAFA and rejoined the team in late December. Skinner missed the following season after he left for a four-month training at the Detectives' Training School in Calcutta under a Colombo Plan scholarship in March 1961. Singapore won the FAM Cup in 1963 but Skinner did not play in the final. He featured in both finals as Singapore won the Malaya Cup in 1964 and 1965. Following the 1965 Cup win, he announced his intention to step down from the state team but retracted his decision and was included in the 1966 squad. He played in the earlier rounds of the 1967 FAM Cup, which Singapore won, but missed the final due to a neck injury sustained during the Asian Cup qualifiers in March. The FAM Cup was Skinner's last involvement with the state team as he was dropped from the 1967 Malaysia Cup (the renamed Malaya Cup) squad with the form of replacement Ahmad Wartam, and the Football Association of Singapore withdrew the team from Malaysia competitions in 1968 and 1969.

=== International ===
In 1953, Skinner was called up to the Singapore team in place of first-choice goalkeeper Chu Chee Seng. He made his international debut against Malaya in the annual Sportsmen's Trophy on 13 September. Skinner also represented Singapore at the 1954 Asian Games. On 4 April 1962, he captained Singapore for the first time in a match against Peruvian club Sporting Cristal.

With the impending merger of Singapore, Malaya, British North Borneo and Sarawak to form Malaysia, Skinner was included in the 18-man Malaysian squad for the Merdeka Tournament in August 1963. He made his debut for Malaysia in a 5–0 loss to South Vietnam on 12 August. Four days later, he skippered the team in place of injured captain Abdul Gani as hosts Malaysia defeated South Korea 3–0. Skinner also featured for Malaysia in the 1964 Merdeka Tournament.

In December 1965, Skinner represented the newly independent nation of Singapore at the 1965 Southeast Asian Peninsular Games. He was selected in the Singapore squad for the 1966 Merdeka Tournament. Skinner's last international assignment was the 1968 Asian Cup qualification in Hong Kong in March 1967. In September, national coach Choo Seng Quee's request to recall Skinner for the up-coming Southeast Asian Peninsular Games was rejected by the Football Association of Singapore and he was not included in the shortlist of players. The FAS decision eventually proved irrelevant as the football team dropped from the Games contingent by the National Sports Council Board in November.

(Skinner) was the most impressive I have seen up to this stage of the tour. He robbed us of at least four more certain goals. I will not hesitate to say that he is good enough for any leading English First Division side. No matter where he plays, whether in Manchester or Liverpool, he is going to stand between the same posts as in Singapore. If as an amateur he could show such good potentialities, he will be even better as a professional.

– Fulham manager, Vic Buckingham, June 1966

Skinner is widely considered as one of the best goalkeepers to play for Singapore. He was ranked 32nd in a list of Singapore's 50 Greatest Athletes of the Century by The Straits Times in 1999 and was the only goalkeeper in the list.

== Hockey career ==
Wilfred Skinner
Personal information
- Full name: Wilfred James Skinner
- Born: 31 May 1934 Singapore
- Died: 2 August 2003 (aged 69) Vancouver, British Columbia, Canada

Sport
- Sport: Field hockey
- Position: Centre-half
Senior career
Years	Team	Caps	Goals
1954–1972	Police SA	-	-
National team
Years	Team	Caps	Goals
1959–1965	Singapore		-

=== Club ===
Skinner joined Police Sports Association's hockey team when he entered the Police Force in December 1954. He played alongside Percy Pennefather, captain of Police SA and the national hockey team at the 1956 Olympic Games, and national football team captain Lee Kok Seng. Police reached their first Oehlers Cup final, Singapore Hockey Association's senior knockout tournament, in 1956 but lost 3–2 to University of Malaya. On 1 March 1957, Police defeated holders University of Malaya 2–0 in the semi-final of the Oehlers Cup after three replays. Five days later, Police claimed their first trophy with a 2–0 victory over Singapore Recreation Club "Reds" in the final. Skinner also won the SHA Division One title with Police in 1958.

=== International ===
In October 1959, right-half Skinner received his first call-up to the Singapore state hockey team for the Malaya Hockey Federation (MHF) inter-state quadrangular. He made his international debut in a 2–0 win over Malaya on 28 November 1959. By the early 1960s, Skinner established himself as Singapore's regular centre-half and skipper. He captained Singapore at the 1962 Asian Games.

In October 1961, the MHF approved Singapore's return to the Pan-Malayan inter-state championship. Singapore lost 3–0 to Selangor in the 1962 inter-state final. In 1963, the MHF inter-state competition underwent a change in format to a Cup competition and was renamed the Razak Cup. Skinner won the 1965 edition with Singapore.

== Personal life ==
Skinner joined the Police Force after graduating from school in December 1954. He rose to the rank of Deputy Superintendent on 18 July 1974. In August 1974, Skinner was awarded the bronze Pingat Pentadbiran Awam state medal. After 20 years of service in the Police Force, Skinner resigned in late December 1974 and emigrated to Canada, where he worked as a handyman.

Skinner married his wife Moira on 6 May 1967; they have a son.

== Death ==
Skinner died at the age of 69 in Vancouver, British Columbia, Canada on 2 August 2003. He had been in a coma for two weeks after suffering a heart attack.

== Honours ==
=== Football ===
Rovers

- SAFA Challenge Cup: 1954

Police

- President's Cup: 1969

Singapore FA

- Malaya Cup: 1960, 1964, 1965

=== Hockey ===
Police

- SHA Division One: 1958
- Oehlers Cup: 1957

Singapore

- Razak Cup: 1965

=== Civil ===
- Pingat Pentadbiran Awam, Bronze: 1974
