= Quah Kim Lye =

Singaporean footballer

Personal information
- Place of birth: Singapore
- Position: Striker

Senior career*
| Years | Team | Apps | (Gls) |
- Tampines Rovers
- Singapore Lions

International career
| 1966–1974 | Singapore | 42 | |
- * Club domestic league appearances and goals

Quah Kim Lye (born 1943) is a former Singapore national football team captain who played for National Football League side Tampines Rovers and the Singapore Lions in the Malaysia Cup as a striker.

Born to father Quah Heck Hock and mother Lau Ah Noi, Quah, the fifth of eleven children, he is a member of the noted footballing family which has produced fellow Singapore internationals such as brothers Kim Beng, Kim Swee, Kim Siak and Kim Song. Along with his brothers, he was discovered by famed national team coach Choo Seng Quee.

== Football career ==
=== International career ===
During the 1966 Asian Games, Quah scored a hat-trick in a 5-0 victory against South Vietnam, which allowed Singapore to qualify for the quarter-finals.

In 1971, Quah retired from the national football team after disagreements with the Football Association of Singapore.

In 1973, Quah was persuaded by his brother, Quah Kim Song, national football coach, Michael Walker and his wife to rejoin the national team to compete at the 1973 SEAP Games held in Singapore. During the semi-final match with South Vietnam, he suffered a left knee injury in the last 10 minutes and was substituted out. The match ended in a 1-1 draw and went to the penalty shootout which Singapore lost 5-3.

== Other career ==
Quah worked at Singapore Pools for 32 years till he retired.

== Personal life ==
Quah underwent a heart bypass surgery in May 2012.

Sporting positions
| Preceded by Lee Kok Seng | Singapore national team captain 1966-1972 | Succeeded by Seak Poh Leong |
