= Peter Corthine =

English-Singaporean footballer

Personal information
- Full name: Peter Alan Corthine
- Date of birth: 19 July 1937
- Place of birth: Highbury, England
- Date of death: January 2015 (aged 77)
- Place of death: Enfield, England
- Height: 5 ft 6 in (1.68 m)
- Position: Inside forward

Youth career
- Tottenham Hotspur

Senior career*
Years	Team	Apps	(Gls)
1956–1957	Leytonstone		
1957	Singapore Joint Services		
1957–1960	Chelsea	2	(0)
1960–1962	Southend United	73	(24)
1962–1963	Chelmsford City	23	(5)
- Gravesend & Northfleet
- Clacton Town
- Ramsgate Athletic

International career
1957	Singapore	5	(7)
- * Club domestic league appearances and goals

Peter Alan Corthine (born 19 July 1937) was a footballer who played as an inside forward. Born in England, he represented Singapore at international level.

== Career ==
Corthine began his career at non-league club Leytonstone. After leaving Leytonstone, Corthine played domestic football in Singapore, whilst in the country with the British Army. In December 1957, Corthine signed for Chelsea. Corthine made two appearances for Chelsea, both in 1959, in losses against Nottingham Forest and Arsenal. In March 1960, Corthine signed for Southend United, scoring 24 goals in 73 league games during his time at the club. After leaving Southend, Corthine dropped back into non-league football, playing for Chelmsford City, Gravesend & Northfleet, Clacton Town and Ramsgate Athletic.

== International career ==
Corthine represented Singapore whilst on national service in the country. Corthine scored seven goals for Singapore in the 1957 Merdeka Tournament.
