= Football at the 1961 SEAP Games =

Football at the 1961 Southeast Asian Peninsular Games
- Venue: 1 (in 1 host city)
- Dates: 11 December - 16 December 1961
- Competitors: 6

Football was contested as part of the programme for the 1961 Southeast Asian Peninsular Games which was hosted in Rangoon, Burma from 11 to 16 December 1961. It was the second edition of the men's football tournament at the multi-sport event organised by the SEAP Games Federation Committee.

The football tournament began with the first matches of the group stage on 11 December 1961 and ended with the gold medal match on 16 December 1961. Hosts Burma and Malaya contested the final. Malaya defeated Burma 2–0 to win the gold medal. In the bronze medal match, South Vietnam and Thailand drew 1–1.

== Background ==
Football had been part of the Southeast Asian Peninsular Games programme following the debut of the men's competition at the inaugural 1959 SEAP Games in Thailand. South Vietnam were the defending champions after defeating hosts Thailand 3–1 in the gold medal match. Laos didn't compete in 1959 and made their debut in 1961.

== Format ==
In total, six teams took part in the competition. They were drawn into two single round robin groups of three teams. The winners and runners-up would then contest the semi-finals which would decide the teams contesting the gold and bronze medal matches.

=== Participants ===
- Burma
- Cambodia
- Laos
- Malaya
- South Vietnam
- Thailand

== Venue ==
Matches were played at the Aung San Memorial Stadium in Rangoon, Burma.

Rangoon is located in Myanmar	Rangoon
Rangoon is located in Myanmar	Aung San Memorial Stadium
Rangoon is located in Myanmar	Capacity: 40,000

== Group stage ==
=== Group A ===
South Vietnam and Thailand advanced to the semi-finals.

==== Table ====
Pos	Team	Pld	W	D	L	GF	GA	GD	Pts	Qualification
1	South Vietnam	2	1	1	0	7	0	+7	3	Advance to Knockout stage
2	Thailand	2	1	1	0	5	2	+3	3	Advance to Knockout stage
3	Laos	2	0	0	2	2	12	−10	0	

==== Matches ====
11 December 1961

Thailand	0–0	South Vietnam

Aung San Memorial Stadium, Rangoon

12 December 1961

South Vietnam	7–0	Laos

Aung San Memorial Stadium, Rangoon
Referee: Tin Maung Oo (Myanmar)

13 December 1961

Thailand	5–2	Laos

Aung San Memorial Stadium, Rangoon
Referee: Tin Maung Oo (Myanmar)

=== Group B ===
Malaya and Burma advanced to the semi-finals.

==== Table ====
Pos	Team	Pld	W	D	L	GF	GA	GD	Pts	Qualification
1	Malaya	2	2	0	0	6	1	+5	4	Advance to Knockout stage
2	Burma	2	1	0	1	5	2	+3	2	Advance to Knockout stage
3	Cambodia	2	0	0	2	0	8	−8	0	

==== Matches ====
11 December 1961

Burma	4–0	Cambodia

Aung San Memorial Stadium, Rangoon

12 December 1961

Malaya	4–0	Cambodia

Aung San Memorial Stadium, Rangoon

13 December 1961

Burma	1–2	Malaya
Unknown		Ong Kim Leng; Ghani

Aung San Memorial Stadium, Rangoon

== Semi-finals ==
Burma defeated South Vietnam to advance to the gold medal match. After a 2–2 draw between Malaya and Thailand, a meeting of the tournament committee was convened the following day and Malaya advanced on the drawing of lots.

14 December 1961

Malaya	2–2 (a.e.t.)	Thailand
Ambu; Ghani 73'		Unknown (x2)

Aung San Memorial Stadium, Rangoon

14 December 1961

South Vietnam	1–2	Burma

Aung San Memorial Stadium, Rangoon

== Bronze medal match ==
Thailand and South Vietnam drew 1–1. It is unclear if the bronze medal was awarded.

16 December 1961

Thailand	1–1	South Vietnam

Aung San Memorial Stadium, Rangoon
Referee: Tin Maung Oo (Myanmar)

== Gold medal match ==
Malaya defeated Burma 2–0 to win the gold medal.

16 December 1961

Burma	0–2	Malaya
		Ambu 80'; Ghani 85'

Aung San Memorial Stadium, Rangoon
Attendance: 50,000
