= Cha Tae-sung =

South Korean footballer

Personal information
- Full name: Cha Tae-sung
- Date of birth: 8 October 1934
- Place of birth: Pyongyang, Heian'nan-dō (South Pyongan Province), Korea, Empire of Japan
- Date of death: 18 November 2006 (aged 72)
- Place of death: Los Angeles, United States
- Height: 1.73 m (5 ft 8 in)
- Positions: Defender; striker

College career
Years	Team	Apps	(Gls)
?–1955	Yonhi University		

Senior career*
Years	Team	Apps	(Gls)
1956–1963	ROK Army CIC		
1963–1964	Cheil Industries		
1965–1967	National Police Department		

International career
1956–1966	South Korea	65	(13)
Medal record
Representing South Korea
Men's football
AFC Asian Cup
Winner	1956 Hong Kong
Winner	1960 South Korea
Asian Games
Silver medal – second place	1958 Tokyo
Silver medal – second place	1962 Jakarta
- * Club domestic league appearances and goals

- Cha Tae-sung
- Hangul: 차태성
- Hanja: 車泰成
- RR: Cha Taeseong
- MR: Ch'a T'aesŏng

Cha Tae-sung (8 October 1934 – 18 November 2006) was a South Korean footballer who competed in the 1964 Summer Olympics.

== Honours ==
ROK Army CIC

- Korean National Championship: 1957, 1959
- Korean President's Cup: 1956, 1957, 1959, 1961

Cheil Industries

- Korean National Semipro League (Spring): 1964

National Police Department

- Korean National Semipro League (Spring): 1966, 1967
- Korean National Semipro League (Autumn): 1966
- Korean President's Cup runner-up: 1966

South Korea

- AFC Asian Cup: 1956, 1960
- Asian Games silver medal: 1958, 1962

Individual

- AFC Asian All-Star: 1965, 1966
