= Soegiono =

Indonesian politician

Soegiono was an Indonesian politician who served as the 9th Regent of Poso Regency from 1984 to 1988. He came from a military background.

He was the founder of University of Sintuwu Maroso.
