= Phwa Sian Liong =

Indonesian footballer

Personal information
- Date of birth: 26 January 1931
- Place of birth: Pasuruan, Dutch East Indies
- Position: Forward

Senior career*
Years	Team	Apps	(Gls)
1949–1954	Persebaya Surabaya	17	(0)
1954–1957	Persija Jakarta	6	(2)
1957–1967	Persebaya Surabaya	46	(17)

International career
1953–1963	Indonesia	50	(8)
Medal record
Men's football
Representing Indonesia
Asian Games
Bronze medal – third place	1958 Tokyo
- * Club domestic league appearances and goals

Phwa Sian Liong or Januar Pribadi (born 26 January 1931) is an Indonesian footballer. He competed in the men's tournament at the 1956 Summer Olympics.

== Honours ==
=== Player ===
Persebaya Surabaya

- Perserikatan: 1951, 1952.

Indonesia

- Asian Games (bronze) Bronze medal: 1958
- Merdeka Tournament: 1961
