= Arthur Koh =

Malaysian footballer

Arthur Koh (born 1936 in British Malaya) is a Malaya footballer who plays for Selangor and Malaya national team.

== Career overview ==
A centre-forward, Arthur was a squad player for Selangor FA that captured the 1959, 1961, 1962 and 1963 Malaysia Cup editions.

He was a squad player for Malaya that captured the 1959 and 1960 Merdeka Tournament editions.

On 3 September 1962, he was a part of the Malaya player that winning bronze medals in the 1962 Asian Games.

== Honour ==
Selangor

- Malaysia Cup: 1959, 1961, 1962, 1963

Malaya

- Merdeka Cup: 1959, 1960
- Sea Games: Gold medal 1961
- Asian Games: Bronze medal 1962
