= 1957 Merdeka Tournament =

Tournament details
- Host country: Federation of Malaya
- Dates: 31 August – 7 September
- Venue: 1 (in 1 host city)

Final positions
- Champions: Hong Kong (1st title)
- Runners-up: Indonesia
- Third place: South Vietnam

Tournament statistics
- Matches played: 17
- Goals scored: 85 (5 per match)

The 1957 Merdeka Tournament (Malay: 1957 Pestabola Merdeka) was the inaugural invitational international association football championship held to commemorate the independence of Malaya. Hosted by Malaya, the competition ran from 31 August to 7 September 1957 and was contested by the national teams of Burma, Cambodia, Indonesia, Malaya, Singapore, South Vietnam and Thailand as well as a Hong Kong League XI.

After two rounds of play, the Hong Kong League XI were crowned champions of the competition after defeating South Vietnam 3–1 in their final match.

== Background ==
The Merdeka Tournament was founded in 1957 as a means to celebrate Independence Day in Malaya. It is the oldest invitational international association football tournament in Asia.

The Hong Kong Football Association invited Eastern Sports Club and other players from the Hong Kong First Division League to form a scratch team for the competition.

== Format ==
In the first round, all eight teams were drawn into four knock-out ties. The winner of each tie would advance to the second round and the losers would contest a consolation round. In the event of a draw, the tie was replayed. The four remaining teams contested a single round robin group to decide the winner of the tournament. The four teams in the consolation round also contested a single round robin group.

=== Participants ===
- Burma
- Cambodia
- Hong Kong League XI
- Indonesia
- Malaya
- Singapore
- South Vietnam
- Thailand

== First round ==
Hong Kong League XI, Indonesia and Malaya advanced to the second round. After a 5–5 draw, South Vietnam defeated Singapore in a replay.

First round
Team 1	Score	Team 2
Hong Kong League XI	6–2	Cambodia
South Vietnam	5–5 (a.e.t.) (replay: 2–1)	Singapore
Indonesia	4–0	Thailand
Malaya	5–2	Burma

=== Matches ===
31 August 1957

Hong Kong League XI	6–2	Cambodia

Merdeka Stadium, Kuala Lumpur
31 August 1957

South Vietnam	5–5 (a.e.t.)	Singapore

Merdeka Stadium, Kuala Lumpur
31 August 1957

Indonesia	4–0	Thailand
Omo S. (x4)

Merdeka Stadium, Kuala Lumpur
1 September 1957

Malaya	5–2	Burma

Merdeka Stadium, Kuala Lumpur

=== Replay ===
1 September 1957

South Vietnam	2–1	Singapore

Merdeka Stadium, Kuala Lumpur

== Second round ==
The Hong Kong League XI completed their fixtures unbeaten and won the tournament after defeating South Vietnam in their final match.

=== Table ===
Team	Pld	W	D	L	GF	GA	GD	Pts	Result
Hong Kong League XI	3	2	1	0	8	5	+3	5	Champions
Indonesia	3	2	0	1	8	5	+3	4	
South Vietnam	3	1	0	2	6	7	−1	2	
Malaya	3	0	1	2	6	11	−5	1	

=== Matches ===
2 September 1957

Hong Kong League XI	2–1	Indonesia
Law Kwok Tai 42'; Szeto Man 53'		Aang Witarsa 20'

Merdeka Stadium, Kuala Lumpur
Attendance: 15,000
3 September 1957

Malaya	1–4	South Vietnam

Merdeka Stadium, Kuala Lumpur
4 September 1957

Malaya	3–3	Hong Kong League XI

Merdeka Stadium, Kuala Lumpur
5 September 1957

Indonesia	3–1	South Vietnam
Tee San Liong 10'; Omo Suratmo 17'; Saari 50'		Trần Văn Đôn 78'

Merdeka Stadium, Kuala Lumpur
7 September 1957

Malaya	2–4	Indonesia
Abdul Ghani Minhat 18', 40'		Jasrin Jusron 32', 70'; Saari 55', 63'

Merdeka Stadium, Kuala Lumpur
7 September 1957

Hong Kong League XI	3–1	South Vietnam
Lau Yee 16'; Szeto Man 37'; Law Kwok Tai 58'		85' (o.g.)

Merdeka Stadium, Kuala Lumpur

== Consolation Tournament ==
Singapore won the consolation tournament after defeating Burma in their final match.

=== Table ===
Team	Pld	W	D	L	GF	GA	GD	Pts
Singapore	3	2	1	0	10	3	+7	5
Burma	3	2	0	1	9	5	+4	4
Thailand	3	1	0	2	5	11	−6	2
Cambodia	3	0	1	2	1	6	−5	1

=== Matches ===
1 September 1957

Thailand	3–0	Cambodia

Merdeka Stadium, Kuala Lumpur
3 September 1957

Singapore	6–0	Thailand

Merdeka Stadium, Kuala Lumpur
3 September 1957

Burma	2–0	Cambodia

Merdeka Stadium, Kuala Lumpur
5 September 1957

Singapore	1–1	Cambodia

Merdeka Stadium, Kuala Lumpur
5 September 1957

Burma	5–2	Thailand

Merdeka Stadium, Kuala Lumpur
7 September 1957

Singapore	3–2	Burma

Merdeka Stadium, Kuala Lumpur
