= Football at the 1965 SEAP Games =

Football at the 1965 Southeast Asian Peninsular Games
- Venue: 1 (in 1 host city)
- Dates: 15 December - 21 December 1965
- Nations: 5

Football was contested as part of the programme for the 1965 Southeast Asian Peninsular Games which was hosted in Kuala Lumpur, Malaysia from 14 to 21 December 1965. It was the third edition of the men's football tournament at the multi-sport event organised by the SEAP Games Federation Committee.

The football tournament began with the first matches of the preliminary round on 15 December 1965 and ended with the gold medal match on 21 December 1965. Burma and Thailand contested the final. The match finished in a 2–2 draw so the gold medal was shared. In the bronze medal match, South Vietnam defeated hosts Malaysia 2–0.

== Background ==
Football had been part of the Southeast Asian Peninsular Games programme following the debut of the men's competition at the inaugural 1959 SEAP Games in Thailand. Malaysia were the defending champions after (as Malaya) defeating hosts Burma 2–0 in the gold medal match. Malaysia and South Vietnam were jointly the most successful teams having both won the gold medal once.

== Format ==
In total, five teams took part in the competition. They were drawn into a group stage but it is unclear how many groups there were or their composition as the group stage was not completed. Instead, after Singapore were eliminated, four teams contested the semi-finals which would decide the teams contesting the gold and bronze medal matches.

=== Participants ===
- Burma
- Malaysia
- Singapore
- South Vietnam
- Thailand

== Venue ==
Matches were played at the Stadium Merdeka in Kuala Lumpur, Malaysia.

Kuala Lumpur is located in Malaysia	Kuala Lumpur
Kuala Lumpur is located in Malaysia	Stadium Merdeka
Kuala Lumpur is located in Malaysia	Capacity: 25,000

== Group stage ==
The nature of the group stage is unclear. After three matches were played, Singapore were eliminated and the other four teams advanced to the semi-finals.

15 December 1965

Thailand	2–1	South Vietnam
Panikabutr 47'; Muankasem 67'		Nguyễn Ngọc Thanh 23'

Stadium Merdeka, Kuala Lumpur

15 December 1965

Burma	1–0	Singapore

Stadium Merdeka, Kuala Lumpur

16 December 1965

South Vietnam	5–1	Singapore
Nguyễn Văn Long 15', 41', 72'; Trần Chánh 32'; Quang Kim Phụng 78'		Omar 27'

Stadium Merdeka, Kuala Lumpur

== Semi-finals ==
Thailand and Burma advanced to the gold medal match.

18 December 1965

Thailand	2–0	South Vietnam
Muankasem 57'; Na Nongkhai 64'

Stadium Merdeka, Kuala Lumpur

18 December 1965

Burma	2–0	Malaysia
Maung Myint; Than Nwin

Stadium Merdeka, Kuala Lumpur

== Bronze medal match ==
South Vietnam defeated Malaysia 2–0 to win the bronze medal.

20 December 1965

Malaysia	0–2	South Vietnam
		Nguyễn Ngọc Thanh 30'; Đỗ Thới Vinh 36'

Stadium Merdeka, Kuala Lumpur

== Gold medal match ==
After a 2–2 draw after extra time, the gold medal was shared between Burma and Thailand.

22 December 1965

Burma	2–2 (a.e.t.)	Thailand
Aung Khin 60', 68'		Muankasem 36'; Yamboonruang 45'

Stadium Merdeka, Kuala Lumpur
Referee: Patrick Nice (Malaysia)
