= Tee San Liong =

Indonesian footballer (1922–1996)

Personal information
- Date of birth: 3 January 1922
- Place of birth: Soerabaja, Dutch East Indies
- Date of death: 30 November 1996 (aged 74)
- Place of death: Surabaya, Indonesia
- Position: Forward

Senior career*
Years	Team	Apps	(Gls)
- Persebaya Surabaya

International career
1951–1960	Indonesia	23	(8)
- * Club domestic league appearances and goals

Tee San Liong (3 January 1922 – 30 November 1996) was an Indonesian former professional footballer who played as a forward. He has represented the Indonesia national team in the men's tournament at the 1954 Asian Games, and has played for Persebaya Surabaya.

== Career statistics ==
=== International ===
Scores and results list Indonesia's goal tally first, score column indicates score after each Tee S. L. goal.

List of international goals scored by Tee San Liong
No.	Date	Venue	Opponent	Score	Result	Competition
1	1 May 1954	Rizal Memorial Stadium, Manila, Philippines	Japan	3–1	5–3	1954 Asian Games
2	1 May 1954	Rizal Memorial Stadium, Manila, Philippines	Japan	4–1	5–3	1954 Asian Games
3	8 May 1954	Rizal Memorial Stadium, Manila, Philippines	Burma	–	4–5	1954 Asian Games
4	8 May 1954	Rizal Memorial Stadium, Manila, Philippines	Burma	–	4–5	1954 Asian Games
5	5 September 1957	Stadium Merdeka, Kuala Lumpur, Malaya	South Vietnam	1–0	3–1	1957 Merdeka Tournament
6	8 August 1960	Stadium Merdeka, Kuala Lumpur, Malaya	Singapore	6–1	8–3	1960 Merdeka Tournament
7	8 August 1960	Stadium Merdeka, Kuala Lumpur, Malaya	Singapore	8–3	8–3	1960 Merdeka Tournament
8	13 August 1960	Stadium Merdeka, Kuala Lumpur, Malaya	South Vietnam	2–0	5–3	1960 Merdeka Tournament

*This is an incomplete list

== Honours ==
SVB/PSS Surabaya

- Stedenwedstrijden: 1949, 1950

Persebaya Surabaya

- Perserikatan: 1951, 1952

Indonesia

- Merdeka Tournament runner-up: 1957; third place: 1960
