= Quah Kim Swee =

Singaporean footballer

Quah Kim Swee (died 18 July 2015) was a Singaporean football footballer who played as a striker.

== Early life ==
Quah was the four

The fourth child of 11 siblings - six of whom played football for Singapore - he stayed close to his brothers and sisters and looked forward to Sunday gatherings and the occasional birthday parties.

== Career ==
Quah played for the Singapore national football team.

== Personal life ==
Quah was the fourth child of 11 siblings.

Quah had three children and two granddaughters.

In the 1990s, Quad had colon cancer in the 1990s and the cancer went into remission in 1998.

In 2015, he was admitted to Khoo Teck Puat Hospital and died due to liver failure on 18 July 2015.
