= Football at the 1962 Asian Games =

Football competition held in Jakarta

- Venue: Gelora Bung Karno Stadium
- Date: 25 August – 4 September
- Nations: 8

Medalists
gold medal	India
silver medal	South Korea
bronze medal	Malaya

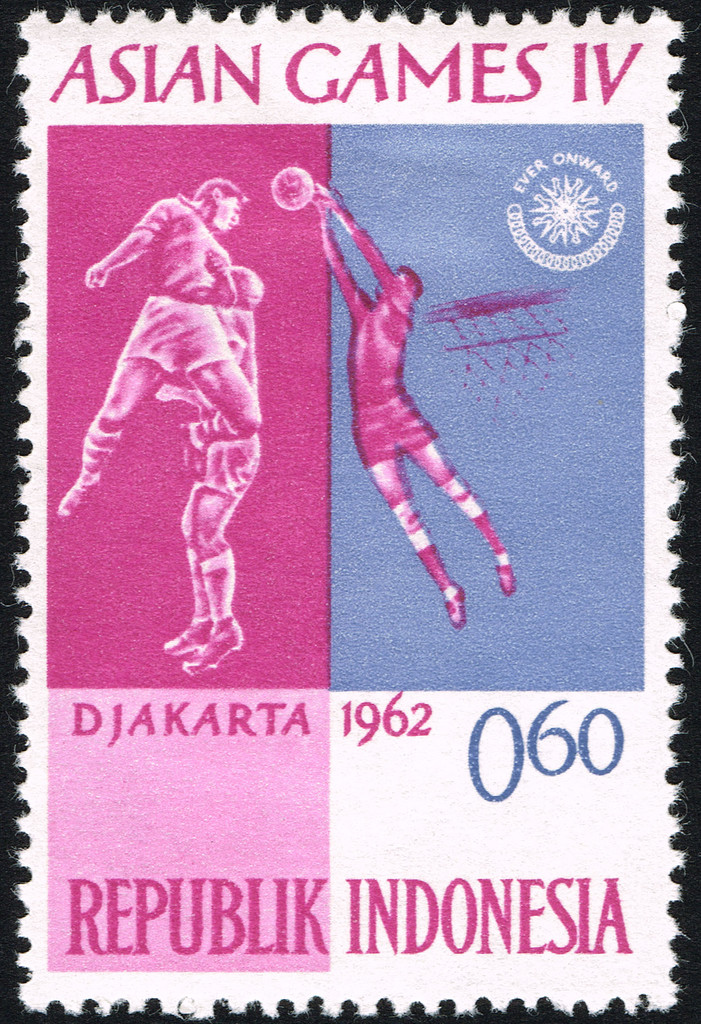
Football at the 1962 Asian Games on a stamp of Indonesia

Football was contested as part of the programme for the 1962 Asian Games which was hosted in Jakarta, Indonesia from 24 August to 4 September 1962. It was the fourth edition of the men's football tournament at the multi-sport event organised by the Asian Games Federation.

The football tournament began with the first matches of the group stage on 25 August 1962 and ended with the gold medal match on 4 September 1962. India and two-time silver medalists South Korea contested the final. India defeated South Korea 2–1 to win the gold medal. In the bronze medal match, Malaya defeated South Vietnam 4–1.

== Background ==
Football had been part of the Asian Games programme following the debut of the men's competition at the inaugural 1951 Asian Games in India.

Taiwan held the record for gold medals having won the football tournament twice. They were the two-time defending champions after defeating South Korea 5–2 in the gold medal match at the 1954 Asian Games in the Philippines and 3–2 after extra time in the gold medal match at the 1958 Asian Games in Japan.

== Format ==
Originally, 11 teams were scheduled to take part. They were drawn into four single round robin groups – three of three teams and one of two teams. However, three teams withdrew so the format was changed and redrawn.

As a result, only eight teams took part in the competition. They were drawn into two single round robin groups of four teams. The group winners and runners-up would contest the semi-finals which would decide the teams contesting the gold and bronze medal matches.

=== Participants ===
- ~~Burma~~
- India
- Indonesia
- ~~Israel~~
- Japan
- Malaya
- Philippines
- ~~Taiwan~~
- Thailand
- South Korea
- South Vietnam

== Draw ==
The original draw for football competition was held on 14 August 1962.

Group A

- ~~Taiwan~~
- ~~Burma~~
- Thailand

Group B

- South Vietnam
- Philippines
- Japan

Group C

- Malaya
- South Korea

Group D

- Indonesia
- ~~Israel~~
- India

Burma withdrew after the draw, while Israel and Taiwan withdrew after Indonesian immigration officials refused to issue visas for their delegations. The revised draw took place on 24 August 1962.

Group A

- Indonesia
- South Vietnam
- Malaya
- Philippines

Group B

- Thailand
- Japan
- India
- South Korea

== Group stage ==
=== Group A ===
South Vietnam advanced to the semi-finals as group winners. Malaya and Indonesia were tied for second after they finished equal on points and goal average. Malaya advanced on drawing of lots.

==== Table ====
Team	Pld	W	D	L	GF	GA	GR	Pts	Qualification
South Vietnam	3	2	0	1	9	1	9.000	4	Qualification for the semi-finals
Malaya	3	2	0	1	18	6	3.000	4	Qualification for the semi-finals
Indonesia	3	2	0	1	9	3	3.000	4	
Philippines	3	0	0	3	1	27	0.037	0	

==== Matches ====
25 August 1962

Indonesia	1–0	South Vietnam

Gelora Bung Karno Stadium, Jakarta
26 August 1962

Malaya	15–1	Philippines

Gelora Bung Karno Stadium, Jakarta

27 August 1962

Indonesia	6–0	Philippines

Gelora Bung Karno Stadium, Jakarta

28 August 1962

Indonesia	2–3	Malaya
Timisela 11', 79'		Ghani 7'; Gabrielle 58'; Koh 65'

Ikada Stadium, Jakarta
Attendance: 40,000

29 August 1962

South Vietnam	3–0	Malaya

Gelora Bung Karno Stadium, Jakarta

30 August 1962

South Vietnam	6–0	Philippines

Gelora Bung Karno Stadium, Jakarta

=== Group B ===
South Korea and India advanced to the semi-finals.

==== Table ====
Team	Pld	W	D	L	GF	GA	GR	Pts	Qualification
South Korea	3	3	0	0	6	2	3.000	6	Qualification for the semi-finals
India	3	2	0	1	6	3	2.000	4	Qualification for the semi-finals
Japan	3	1	0	2	3	4	0.750	2	
Thailand	3	0	0	3	4	10	0.400	0	

==== Matches ====
25 August 1962

Japan	3–1	Thailand

Gelora Bung Karno Stadium, Jakarta
26 August 1962

India	0–2	South Korea
		Jeong Sun-cheon 30'; Cha Tae-sung 80'

Senayan Main Stadium, Jakarta
Attendance: 95,000

27 August 1962

South Korea	3–2	Thailand

Gelora Bung Karno Stadium, Jakarta

28 August 1962

Thailand	1–4	India
Unknown		Banerjee (x2); Goswami; Balaram

Gelora Bung Karno Stadium, Jakarta

29 August 1962

India	2–0	Japan
Banerjee 54'; Balaram 70'

Gelora Bung Karno Stadium, Jakarta

30 August 1962

South Korea	1–0	Japan

Gelora Bung Karno Stadium, Jakarta

== Semi-finals ==
India defeated South Vietnam and South Korea defeated Malaya to advance to the gold medal match.

1 September 1962

South Vietnam	2–3	India
Phan Dương Cẩm 52' (pen.); Đỗ Thới Vinh 64'		Goswami 13', 75'; J. Singh 41'

Gelora Bung Karno Stadium, Jakarta

1 September 1962

South Korea	2–1 (a.e.t.)	Malaya
Jeong Sun-cheon 72'; Cha Tae-sung 97'		Mahat Ambu 70'

Gelora Bung Karno Stadium, Jakarta

== Bronze medal match ==
Malaya defeated South Vietnam to win the bronze medal.

3 September 1962

South Vietnam	1–4	Malaya

Gelora Bung Karno Stadium, Jakarta

== Gold medal match ==
India defeated South Korea to win the gold medal.

4 September 1962

India	2–1	South Korea
Banerjee 17'; J. Singh 20'		Cha Tae-sung 23'

Gelora Bung Karno Stadium, Jakarta
Attendance: 100,000
Referee: John Ferguson (Singapore)
