= Lee Kok Seng =

Singaporean footballer

Lee Kok Seng (died 22 August 2014) was a Singaporean football footballer who played as a defender.

== Career ==
=== Football career ===
Lee played for the Singapore national football team.

=== Public service ===
Lee was also a deputy superintendent of the Singapore Police Force.

== Personal life ==
Lee had two sons and a daughter.

Lee's brother, Lee Kok Leong, is a former football referee who was awarded the Fifa Referee Special Award.

== Honors ==
Malaysia Cup : 1965
