= Rahim Omar =

Singaporean football player

Personal information
- Full name: Rahim Omar
- Date of birth: 1934
- Place of birth: Kuala Lumpur, Malaysia
- Date of death: 19 February 1990 (aged 55–56)
- Position: Forward

Senior career*
Years	Team	Apps	(Gls)
????–1954	Star Soccerites		
1955	Argonauts		

International career
- Singapore
- * Club domestic league appearances and goals

Rahim Omar (1934 - 19 February 1990) was a Singaporean football player who played as a striker.

== Early life ==
Rahim studied at St Andrew School in Singapore.

== Football career ==
Omar played for the Singapore national football team.

== Outside of football ==
Rahim worked at the Singapore Telephone Board.

== Personal life ==
Rahim was married to Hamidah with three children.

On 19 February 1990, Rahim died of a heart attack at the Kuala Lumpur General Hospital.
