= Malaya national football team =

National association football team

Malaya
1948–1963
- Nickname: Harimau Malaya (Malayan tiger)
- Association: Football Association of Malaya (FAM)
- Confederation: AFC (Asia)
- Top scorer: Abdul Ghani Minhat (58)
- Home stadium: Stadium Merdeka, Kuala Lumpur
- FIFA code: MAL
First colours	Second colours

First international
- Singapore 4–2 Malaya (Singapore; 20 June 1948)

Last international
- Malaya 3–0 South Korea (Kuala Lumpur, Malaya; 16 August 1963)

Biggest win
- Malaya 15–1 Philippines (Jakarta, Indonesia; 26 August 1962)

Biggest defeat
- South Vietnam 6–1 Malaya (Tokyo, Japan; 27 May 1958); Indonesia 5–0 Malaya (Jakarta, Indonesia; 20 April 1960); Malaya 0–5 South Vietnam (Kuala Lumpur, Malaya; 11 August 1963)
Medal record
Asian Games
Bronze medal – third place	1962 Jakarta	Team
SEA Games
Gold medal – first place	1961 Myanmar	Team

The Malaya national football team represented the Federation of Malaya during its existence from 1948 to 1963. The modern Malaysia national football team, active since the 1963 Merdeka Tournament, is considered its direct successor.

== Competitive record ==
=== FIFA World Cup ===
[[FIFA World Cup|FIFA World Cup finals]]									[[FIFA World Cup qualification|Qualification]]						
Year	Result	Position	Pld	W	D	L	GF	GA	Round	Pld	W	D	L	GF	GA
(Uruguay) 1930	Not a FIFA member								Not a FIFA member						
(Italy) 1934	Not a FIFA member								Not a FIFA member						
(France) 1938	Not a FIFA member								Not a FIFA member						
(Brazil) 1950	Not a FIFA member								Not a FIFA member						
(Switzerland) 1954	Not a FIFA member								Not a FIFA member						
(Sweden) 1958	Did not enter								Did not enter						
(Chile) 1962	Did not enter								Did not enter						
Total	0/0	—	–	–	–	–	–	–	–	–	–	–	–	–	—

=== Olympic Games ===
[[Football at the Summer Olympics|Olympic Games]] record
Year	Round	Position	GP	W	D	L	GS	GA
(United Kingdom) 1948	Did not enter							
(Finland) 1952	Did not enter							
(Australia) 1956	Did not enter							
(Italy) 1960	Did not enter							

=== AFC Asian Cup ===
[[AFC Asian Cup|AFC Asian Cup]] record									[[AFC Asian Cup qualifiers|Qualification]] record					
Year	Round	Position	Pld	W	D	L	GF	GA	Pld	W	D	L	GF	GA
(Hong Kong) 1956	did not qualify								4	1	1	2	14	12
(South Korea) 1960	did not qualify								2	1	0	1	5	3
Total	—	0/0	–	–	–	–	–	–	6	2	1	3	19	15

=== Asian Games ===
Asian Games record
Year	Round	Position	GP	W	D	L	GS	GA
(India) 1951	did not enter							
(Philippines) 1954	did not enter							
(Japan) 1958	Group stage	12/14	3	0	0	3	2	8
(Indonesia) 1962	Third place	3/8	5	3	0	2	23	9
Total	Best results: Third Place	2/2	8	3	0	5	25	17

=== SEA Games ===
[[Football at the Southeast Asian Games|SEA Games]] record
Year	Round	Position	GP	W	D	L	GF	GA
(Thailand) 1959	Third Place	3/4	3	2	0	1	5	5
(Myanmar) 1961	Winners	1/5	4	4	0	0	10	3
Total	Best results: Winners	2/2	7	6	0	1	15	8

== Records ==
Top goalscorers
#	Player	Goals	Career
1	Abdul Ghani Minhat	58	1956–1962
2	Robert Choe	20	1958–1962
3	Arthur Koh	14	1958–1962
4	Stanley Gabrielle	11	1959–1964
5	Rahim Omar	11	1957–1962

== All-time results ==
Source: World Football Eloratings

*Malaya's score listed first.

Date	Opponent	Score*	Venue
20 June 1948	Singapore	2–4	(Federation of Malaya) Malaya
13 September 1953	Singapore	3–1	(Federation of Malaya) Malaya
17 March 1956	Cambodia	9–2	Cambodia
3 May 1956	South Vietnam	0–4	South Vietnam
24 May 1956	South Vietnam	3–3	(Federation of Malaya) Malaya
16 February 1957	India	2–3	(Federation of Malaya) Malaya
11 May 1957	Singapore	1–1	(Federation of Malaya) Malaya
1 September 1957	Burma	5–2	(Federation of Malaya) Malaya
3 September 1957	South Vietnam	1–4	(Federation of Malaya) Malaya
4 September 1957	Hong Kong	3–3	(Federation of Malaya) Malaya
7 September 1957	Indonesia	2–4	(Federation of Malaya) Malaya
31 October 1957	Cambodia	3–1	Cambodia
1 March 1958	Singapore	5–2	(Federation of Malaya) Malaya
2 March 1958	Singapore	3–1	(Federation of Malaya) Malaya
3 May 1958	Singapore	3–3	Singapore
4 May 1958	Singapore	3–0	Singapore
14 May 1958	Pakistan	4–2	(Federation of Malaya) Malaya
25 May 1958	Taiwan	1–2	Japan
27 May 1958	South Vietnam	1–6	Japan
4 June 1958	Hong Kong	2–2	Hong Kong
3 July 1958	Indonesia	2–4	Singapore
30 August 1958	Indonesia	3–2	(Federation of Malaya) Malaya
1 September 1958	Hong Kong	3–0	(Federation of Malaya) Malaya
2 September 1958	Singapore	0–0	(Federation of Malaya) Malaya
4 September 1958	South Vietnam	2–0	(Federation of Malaya) Malaya
28 December 1958	Japan	6–2	(Federation of Malaya) Malaya
4 January 1959	Japan	1–3	(Federation of Malaya) Malaya
22 January 1959	Burma	4–2	(Myanmar) Burma
24 January 1959	Burma	2–3	(Myanmar) Burma
27 January 1959	Burma	0–2	(Myanmar) Burma
11 May 1959	Singapore	5–2	Singapore
13 May 1959	South Vietnam	0–1	Singapore
2 September 1959	South Vietnam	4–3	(Federation of Malaya) Malaya
4 September 1959	India	1–1	(Federation of Malaya) Malaya
6 September 1959	Hong Kong	2–1	(Federation of Malaya) Malaya
13 December 1959	Burma	2–1	Thailand
14 December 1959	Thailand	1–3	Thailand
15 December 1959	South Vietnam	2–1	Thailand
20 April 1960	Indonesia	0–5	Indonesia
6 May 1960	India	0–0	(Federation of Malaya) Malaya
7 August 1960	Thailand	8–2	(Federation of Malaya) Malaya
12 August 1960	Pakistan	1–0	(Federation of Malaya) Malaya
14 August 1960	South Korea	0–0	(Federation of Malaya) Malaya
28 May 1961	Japan	2–3	Japan
2 August 1961	Japan	3–2	(Federation of Malaya) Malaya
5 August 1961	South Vietnam	3–1	(Federation of Malaya) Malaya
9 August 1961	India	1–2	(Federation of Malaya) Malaya
13 August 1961	Indonesia	1–2	(Federation of Malaya) Malaya
23 October 1961	Indonesia	3–1	South Vietnam
26 October 1961	South Vietnam	0–1	South Vietnam
12 December 1961	Cambodia	4–0	(Myanmar) Burma
13 December 1961	Burma	2–1	(Myanmar) Burma
14 December 1961	Thailand	2–2	(Myanmar) Burma
16 December 1961	Burma	2–0	(Myanmar) Burma
4 June 1962	South Korea	1–3	(Federation of Malaya) Malaya
6 June 1962	South Korea	3–4	(Federation of Malaya) Malaya
8 June 1962	South Korea	1–0	(Federation of Malaya) Malaya
26 August 1962	Philippines	15–1	Indonesia
28 August 1962	Indonesia	3–2	Indonesia
29 August 1962	South Vietnam	0–3	Indonesia
1 September 1962	South Korea	1–2	Indonesia
3 September 1962	South Vietnam	1–4	Indonesia
8 September 1962	Japan	2–2	(Federation of Malaya) Malaya
13 September 1962	Burma	3–2	(Federation of Malaya) Malaya
16 September 1962	Pakistan	0–0	(Federation of Malaya) Malaya
27 October 1962	Thailand	4–2	South Vietnam
28 October 1962	Indonesia	1–2	South Vietnam
30 October 1962	South Vietnam	0–2	South Vietnam
18 November 1962	Sweden	0–0	(Federation of Malaya) Malaya
22 November 1962	Sweden	0–1	(Federation of Malaya) Malaya
8 August 1963	Japan	3–4	(Federation of Malaya) Malaya
11 August 1963	South Vietnam	0–5	(Federation of Malaya) Malaya
12 August 1963	Chinese Taipei	2–3	(Federation of Malaya) Malaya
14 August 1963	Thailand	2–2	(Federation of Malaya) Malaya
16 August 1963	South Korea	3–0	(Federation of Malaya) Malaya

== Coaches ==
- (Federation of Malaya) G. Paul (1956)
- (Federation of Malaya) Neoh Boon Hean (1957)
- (Singapore) Choo Seng Quee (1958)
- (Federation of Malaya) Harun Idris (1961–1962)

== Honours ==
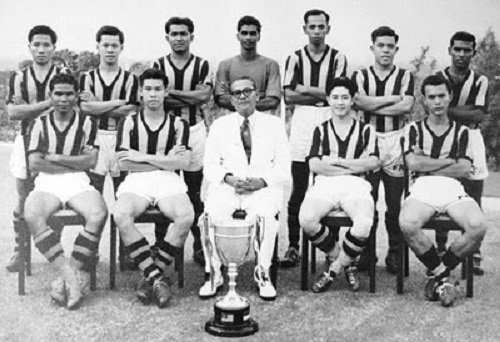
The winner of the second season of Merdeka Cup in 1958, Malaya football team, five years before the merger to form Malaysia. Also in the picture is Tunku Abdul Rahman (centre), the first Prime Minister of Malaya and at that time president of Football Association of Malaya & Asian Football Confederation.

=== Continental ===
- Asian Games
  - Bronze medal (1): 1962

=== Regional ===
- SEA Games
  - Gold medal (1): 1961
  - Bronze medal (1): 1959

=== Friendly ===
- Pestabola Merdeka
  - Winners (3): 1958, 1959, 1960*
  - Runners-up (1): 1961
- South Vietnam Independence Cup
  - Runners-up (1): 1961

*trophy shared

== Titles ==
Preceded by 1959 South Vietnam	SEA Games Champions; 1961 (First title)	Succeeded by 1963 Not held
