= Indonesia national football team results (1950–1979) =

This article provides details of international football games played by the Indonesia national football team from 1950 to 1979.

== Results ==
Key
Win
Draw
Defeat

=== 1951 ===
5 March 1951 Asian Games GS	India	3–0	Indonesia	New Delhi, India
16:15 UTC+5:30	Mewalal 27'; Siregar 42' (o.g.); Venkatesh 45'	Report		Stadium: National Stadium

9 March Friendly	Indonesia	4–1	Burma	New Delhi, India
--:-- UTC+5:30	Goal		Goal

=== 1953 ===
30 April Friendly	Indonesia	1–3	South Korea	Hong Kong
--:-- UTC+8	Dalhar 24'		Chung Nam-sik 18'; Choi Chung-min 80'; Choi Yung-keun 85'

=== 1954 ===
1 May 1954 Asian Games GS	Japan	3–5	Indonesia	Manila, Philippines
--:-- UTC+8	Kano 20' (pen.); Tokita 70'; Takabayashi 80'		Ramang 10'; Dalhar 25' (pen.), 41' (pen.); San Liong 33', 36'	Stadium: Rizal Memorial Stadium

5 May 1954 Asian Games GS	India	0–4	Indonesia	Manila, Philippines
--:-- UTC+8		Report	Dalhar 5' (pen.), 80'; Ramang 51', 69'	Stadium: Rizal Memorial Stadium

7 May 1954 Asian Games SF	Taiwan	4–2	Indonesia	Manila, Philippines
--:-- UTC+8	Lee Tai-fai 10', 75'; Yiu Cheuk-yin 20'; Chu Wing-keung 32'		Witarsa 5'; Siregar 71'	Stadium: Rizal Memorial Stadium

8 May 1954 Asian Games Bronze Medal	Indonesia	4–5	Burma	Manila, Philippines
--:-- UTC+8	San Liong; Dalhar; Ramang		Goal	Stadium: Rizal Memorial Stadium

=== 1956 ===
9 September Friendly	Yugoslavia	4–2	Indonesia	Belgrade, SFR Yugoslavia
--:-- UTC+2	Milutinović 35', 38', 68'; Kostić 85'	Report	Stanković 89' (o.g.); Danoe 89'	Stadium: JNA Stadium; Attendance: 25,000; Referee: Yordan Takov (Bulgaria)

12 September Friendly	Croatia	5–2	Indonesia	Zagreb, SFR Yugoslavia
--:-- UTC+2	Matuš 9'; Krstulović 13'; Rebac 17', 54'; Benko 43'	Report	Liong Houw 24'; Witarsa 70'	Stadium: Stadion Maksimir; Attendance: 12,000; Referee: Ezio Damiani (Croatia)

20 September Friendly	East Germany	3–1	Indonesia	Karl-Marx-Stadt, East Germany
--:-- UTC+2	Günther 3'; Tröger 49', 75'		Ramli Yatim 34'	Stadium: Ernst Thälmann Stadion; Attendance: 50,000; Referee: Gérard Versyp (Belgium)

29 November 1956 Summer Olympics QF	Soviet Union	0–0 (a.e.t.)	Indonesia	Melbourne, Australia
12:00 UTC+11		Report		Stadium: Olympic Park Stadium; Attendance: 3,228; Referee: Shigemaru Takenokoshi (Japan)

1 December 1956 Summer Olympics QF	Soviet Union	4–0	Indonesia	Melbourne, Australia
12:00 UTC+11	Salnikov 17', 59'; Ivanov 19'; Netto 43'	Report		Stadium: Olympic Park Stadium; Attendance: 6,735; Referee: R. Lund (New Zealand)

23 December Friendly	Indonesia	1–5	Yugoslavia	Jakarta, Indonesia
--:-- UTC+7	Liong Houw 53' (pen.)		Lipošinović 16'; Veselinović 40', 48'; Radović 69'; Papec 89'	Stadium: Ikada Stadium; Attendance: 40,000; Referee: Chris H. Wensveen (Indonesia)

=== 1957 ===
12 May 1958 FIFA World Cup qualification	Indonesia	2–0	China	Jakarta, Indonesia
--:-- UTC+7	Ramang 47', 80'	Report		Stadium: Ikada Stadium; Referee: Jonni (Italy)

2 June 1958 FIFA World Cup qualification	China	4–3	Indonesia	Beijing, China
--:-- UTC+8	Zhang Honggen 1'; Nian Weisi 9'; Sun Fucheng 47'; Wang Lu 75'	Report	Ramang 25', 55'; Witarsa 70'	Stadium: Xiannongtan Stadium; Referee: Chakravarti (India)

23 June 1958 FIFA World Cup qualification	Indonesia	0–0 (a.e.t.)	China	Rangoon, Burma
--:-- UTC+6:30		Report		Stadium: Aung San Stadium; Referee: U Ba Thaung (Burma)

31 August 1957 Merdeka Tournament	Indonesia	4–0	Thailand	Kuala Lumpur, Malaya
--:-- UTC+8	Suratmo 5', 12', 33', 68'			Stadium: Stadium Merdeka

2 September 1957 Merdeka Tournament	Indonesia	1–2	Hong Kong	Kuala Lumpur, Malaya
--:-- UTC+8	Saari 22'		Lau Kwok Tai 43'; Szeto Man 55'	Stadium: Stadium Merdeka

5 September 1957 Merdeka Tournament	Indonesia	3–1	South Vietnam	Kuala Lumpur, Malaya
--:-- UTC+8	Sian Liong 10'; Suratmo 17'; Saari 50'		Don 78'	Stadium: Stadium Merdeka

7 September 1957 Merdeka Tournament	Malaya	2–4	Indonesia	Kuala Lumpur, Malaya
--:-- UTC+8	Minhat 18', 40'		Jasrin Jusron 32', 70'; Saari 55', 63'	Stadium: Stadium Merdeka

=== 1958 ===
9 May Friendly	Philippines	1–2	Indonesia	Manila, Philippines
--:-- UTC+8	? 12' (pen.)		Suratmo 13' 37'	Stadium: Rizal Memorial Stadium

13 May Friendly	Philippines	0–3	Indonesia	Manila, Philippines
--:-- UTC+8			Suratmo 13', 24'; Soerjadi 50'	Stadium: Rizal Memorial Stadium

25 May 1958 Asian Games GS	Indonesia	4–2	Burma	Tokyo, Japan
--:-- UTC+9	Wowo Sunaryo 16', 19'; Liong Houw 31'; Saari 73'		Samuel 43'; Tun Aung 60'

28 May 1958 Asian Games GS	India	1–2	Indonesia	Tokyo, Japan
--:-- UTC+9	Rahmatullah 35'		Him Tjiang 11', 53'

30 May 1958 Asian Games QF	Indonesia	5–2	Philippines	Tokyo, Japan
--:-- UTC+9	Bakir Goordey 20', 64'; Wowo Sunaryo 21', 30', 60'		24'; 82'

31 May 1958 Asian Games SF	Taiwan	1–0	Indonesia	Tokyo, Japan
--:-- UTC+9	Goal			Stadium: National Stadium

1 June 1958 Asian Games Bronze Medal	Indonesia	4–1	India	Tokyo, Japan
--:-- UTC+9	Saari 10'; Suratmo 59'; Wowo Sunaryo 60'; Sian Liong 80'		Balaram 46' (pen.)	Stadium: National Stadium; Attendance: 46,000

2 July Friendly	Singapore	0–5	Indonesia	Kallang, Singapore
--:-- UTC+8			Suratmo 21', 34', 58'; Sian Liong 26'; Liong Houw 55'	Stadium: Jalan Besar Stadium; Attendance: 6.745

3 July Friendly	Malaya	2–4	Indonesia	Kallang, Singapore
--:-- UTC+8	Ahmad Yusoff; Rahim Omar		Suratmo 4', 50'; Saari 23'; Soerjadi 54'; Bakir 57'	Stadium: Jalan Besar Stadium

30 August 1958 Merdeka Tournament	Malaya	3–2	Indonesia	Kuala Lumpur, Malaya
--:-- UTC+8	Robert Choe 11', 15'; Ng Boon Bee 89'		Sian Liong 8', 64'	Stadium: Stadium Merdeka; Attendance: 12,000; Referee: T. Nadarajah (Malaya)

31 August 1958 Merdeka Tournament	Indonesia	2–0	Singapore	Kuala Lumpur, Malaya
--:-- UTC+8	Joop De Freetes 26'; Bakir 63'			Stadium: Stadium Merdeka; Attendance: 10,000

2 September 1958 Merdeka Tournament	Indonesia	4–1	South Vietnam	Kuala Lumpur, Malaya
--:-- UTC+8	Liong Houw 20' (pen.); Bakir 25'; Saari 38'; Soerjadi 52'		Han 70'	Stadium: Stadium Merdeka; Attendance: 10,000; Referee: T. Nadarajah (Malaya)

=== 1959 ===
11 February Friendly	Indonesia	2–2	East Germany	Jakarta, Indonesia
--:-- UTC+7	Ramang 30'; Witarsa 43'		Günther 53'; Roland 78'	Stadium: Ikada Stadium

=== 1960 ===
14 April 1960 Summer Olympics qualification	India	4–2	Indonesia	Calcutta, India
--:-- UTC+5:30	Sundararaj 10', 63'; Kannan 21'; Balaram 73'	Report	Suratmo 9'; Timisela 84'

20 April Friendly	Indonesia	5–0	Malaya	Surakarta, Indonesia
--:-- UTC+7	Goal			Stadium: Sriwedari Stadium

30 April 1960 Summer Olympics qualification	Indonesia	0–2	India	Jakarta, Indonesia
--:-- UTC+7		Report	Goswami 78'; Sundararaj 87'	Stadium: Ikada Stadium

6 August 1960 Merdeka Tournament	South Korea	2–0	Indonesia	Kuala Lumpur, Malaya
--:-- UTC+8	Cha Tae-Sung 33', 64'			Stadium: Stadium Merdeka; Referee: Bahadur Khan (Pakistan)

8 August 1960 Merdeka Tournament	Singapore	3–8	Indonesia	Kuala Lumpur, Malaya
--:-- UTC+8	Quah Kim Swee 20', 56'; Hassan 67'		Timisela 27', 28', 46', 49'; Soehendar 38', 75'; Sian Liong 53', 80'	Stadium: Stadium Merdeka; Referee: Boonsong Sam La-Or (Thailand)

11 August 1960 Merdeka Tournament	Indonesia	3–1	Hong Kong	Kuala Lumpur, Malaya
--:-- UTC+8	Goal		Goal	Stadium: Stadium Merdeka; Referee: S. Hayakawa (Japan)

13 August 1960 Merdeka Tournament	South Vietnam	3–5	Indonesia	Kuala Lumpur, Malaya
--:-- UTC+8	Trần Văn Đôn 31'; Lâm Văn Bốn 51'; Tạ Vinh Trạch 67'		Suratmo 6' (pen.), 53'; Sian Liong 22'; Timisela 60', 76'	Stadium: Stadium Merdeka

14 August 1960 Merdeka Tournament	Pakistan	0–4	Indonesia	Kuala Lumpur, Malaya
--:-- UTC+8			Suratmo 51' (pen.), 69', 73'; Timisela 64'	Stadium: Stadium Merdeka; Referee: Hong Bark-Young (South Korea)

17 August Friendly	Indonesia	1–1	South Vietnam	Kallang, Singapore
--:-- UTC+8	Timisela 55'		Ngo 58'	Stadium: Jalan Besar Stadium; Attendance: 5.109; Referee: Haron Angullia

21 August Friendly	Indonesia	5–2	Pakistan	Jakarta, Indonesia
--:-- UTC+7	Timisela 8'; own goal 16'; Suratmo 34' (pen.) 63'; Pietje Timisela 50'		Kabir 30'; Moosa 68'	Stadium: Ikada Stadium

=== 1961 ===
2 August 1961 Merdeka Tournament	Singapore	0–1	Indonesia	Kuala Lumpur, Malaya
--:-- UTC+8			Timisela 71'	Stadium: Stadium Merdeka

9 August 1961 Merdeka Tournament	Thailand	1–2	Indonesia	Kuala Lumpur, Malaya
--:-- UTC+8	Nilphirom 70'		Dirhamsjah 5'; Timisela 14'	Stadium: Stadium Merdeka

12 August 1961 Merdeka Tournament	Indonesia	1–1	South Korea	Kuala Lumpur, Malaya
--:-- UTC+8	Timisela 73'		Kim Duk-joong 52'	Stadium: Stadium Merdeka

13 August 1961 Merdeka Tournament Final	Malaysia	1–2	Indonesia	Kuala Lumpur, Malaya
--:-- UTC+8	Minhat 22'		Timisela 13'; Frans Jo 63'	Stadium: Stadium Merdeka

15 August Friendly	Indonesia	2–0	Japan	Kallang, Singapore
--:-- UTC+8	Suratmo 60'; Frans Jo 88'			Stadium: Jalan Besar Stadium; Attendance: 4,000

21 October 1961 Quoc Khanh Cup	South Vietnam	4–1	Indonesia	Saigon, South Vietnam
--:-- UTC+7	Goal		Goal

23 October 1961 Quoc Khanh Cup	Malaya	3–1	Indonesia	Saigon, South Vietnam
--:-- UTC+7	Mahat Ambu 23'; M. Kuppan 28'; Abdul Rahman Dale 42'		Liong Houw 52'	Attendance: 20,000

7 December Friendly	Indonesia	1–5	Yugoslavia	Jakarta, Indonesia
--:-- UTC+7	Witarsa 20'		Radaković 34'; Galić 53'; Šekularac 56'; Muji 58'; Zvonko 82'	Stadium: Ikada Stadium; Referee: Chris H. Wensveen (Indonesia)

=== 1962 ===
12 July Friendly	Singapore	1–2	Indonesia	Kallang, Singapore
--:-- UTC+8	Ali Samijan 30'		Timisela 12'; Maurits Manuhutu 46'	Stadium: Jalan Besar Stadium

25 August 1962 Asian Games GS	Indonesia	1–0	South Vietnam	Jakarta, Indonesia
--:-- UTC+7	Solong 62'			Stadium: Ikada Stadium; Referee: Ferguson (Singapore)

27 August 1962 Asian Games GS	Indonesia	6–0	Philippines	Jakarta, Indonesia
--:-- UTC+7	Goal			Stadium: Senajan Stadium

28 August 1962 Asian Games GS	Indonesia	2–3	Malaya	Jakarta, Indonesia
--:-- UTC+7	Timisela 11', 79'	Report	Minhat 7'; Stanley Gabrielle 58'; Koh 65'	Stadium: Ikada Stadium; Attendance: 40,000

11 September 1962 Merdeka Tournament	Indonesia	2–0	Singapore	Kuala Lumpur, Malaya
--:-- UTC+8	Maurits Manuhutu 58'; Timisela 68'			Stadium: Stadium Merdeka

12 September 1962 Merdeka Tournament	Indonesia	9–0	Philippines	Kuala Lumpur, Malaya
--:-- UTC+8	Solong Hajah 14', 20', 51', 68'; Ahmadsjah Ipong Silalahi 37'; Emen Suwarman 54' 70'; Tahir Yusuf 59'; Maurits Manuhutu 78'			Stadium: Stadium Merdeka

14 September 1962 Merdeka Tournament	Indonesia	2–1	South Vietnam	Kuala Lumpur, Malaya
--:-- UTC+8	Maurits Manuhutu 43'; Timisela 50'	Report	Phan Duong Cam 46' (pen.)	Stadium: Stadium Merdeka

17 September 1962 Merdeka Tournament	South Korea B	0–3	Indonesia	Kuala Lumpur, Malaya
--:-- UTC+8			Timisela 30' 75'; Maurits Manuhutu 57'	Stadium: Stadium Merdeka

19 September 1962 Merdeka Tournament Final	Indonesia	2–1	Pakistan	Kuala Lumpur, Malaya
--:-- UTC+8	Solong Hajah 35'; Timisela 36'		Moosa 28'	Stadium: Stadium Merdeka; Attendance: 30,000

12 October Friendly	South Korea	2–0	Indonesia	Seoul, South Korea
--:-- UTC+9	Chung Soon-Chun 30'; Woo Sang-Kwon 32'

14 October Friendly	South Korea	2–0	Indonesia	Seoul, South Korea
--:-- UTC+9	Cha Tae-Sung 12'; Chung Soon-Chun 33'

25 October 1962 Quoc Khanh Cup	South Vietnam	4–0	Indonesia	Saigon, South Vietnam
--:-- UTC+7	Goal

28 October 1962 Quoc Khanh Cup	Indonesia	2–1	Malaya	Saigon, South Vietnam
--:-- UTC+7	Marinus Manuhuttu		Ibrahim 52'

30 October 1962 Quoc Khanh Cup	Indonesia	7–0	Thailand	Saigon, South Vietnam
--:-- UTC+7	Goal

31 October 1962 Quoc Khanh Cup Final	South Vietnam	2–0	Indonesia	Saigon, South Vietnam
--:-- UTC+7	Goal

=== 1963 ===
25 April 1963 Piala Soekarno	Indonesia	1–3	United Arab Republic	Jakarta, Indonesia
--:-- UTC+7	Komar 52'		Ahmad Sayed 25'; Badewi 28'; Toha Ismael 37'	Stadium: Gelora Bung Karno Stadium; Attendance: 50.000

27 April 1963 Piala Soekarno	Indonesia	2–2	United Arab Republic	Jakarta, Indonesia
--:-- UTC+7	Mauritz 56'; Komar 60'	Report	Toha Ismael 24'; Mohhamed 33'	Stadium: Gelora Bung Karno Stadium

29 April 1963 Piala Soekarno	Indonesia	3–1	North Vietnam	Jakarta, Indonesia
		Report		Stadium: Gelora Bung Karno Stadium

3 May Friendly	Indonesia	1–2	China	Bandung, Indonesia
--:-- UTC+7	Goal		Goal	Stadium: Siliwangi Stadium

17 August Friendly	China	3–0	Indonesia	Pyongyang, North Korea
--:-- UTC+8	Sun Yunshan; Li Xuejun

14 November 1963 GANEFO	Indonesia	3–2	Mali	Jakarta, Indonesia
--:-- UTC+7	Wowo Sunaryo 15'; Komar 64' 85'	Report	Salif Keita 72'; Idrissa 74'	Stadium: Gelora Bung Karno Stadium

16 November 1963 GANEFO	China	1–1	Indonesia	Jakarta, Indonesia
--:-- UTC+7	Goal		Goal	Stadium: Gelora Bung Karno Stadium

18 November 1963 GANEFO QF	North Korea	5–1	Indonesia	Jakarta, Indonesia
--:-- UTC+7	Goal		Wowo Sunaryo 38'	Stadium: Gelora Bung Karno Stadium; Attendance: 100.000

=== 1964 ===
23 February Friendly	Ceylon	3–9	Indonesia	Colombo, Ceylon
--:-- UTC+5:30	Amidon		Komar	Stadium: Sugathadasa Stadium

29 February Friendly	Ceylon	2–4	Indonesia	Colombo, Ceylon
--:-- UTC+5:30	Goal	Report	Goal	Stadium: Sugathadasa Stadium

=== 1965 ===
29 April Friendly	Indonesia	5–0	Ceylon	Jakarta, Indonesia
--:-- UTC+7	Goal			Stadium: Gelora Bung Karno Stadium

2 August 1965 GANEFO	China	3–0	Indonesia	Pyongyang, North Korea
--:-- UTC+9	Goal

5 August 1965 GANEFO	Indonesia	1–3	Guinea	Pyongyang, North Korea
--:-- UTC+9	Goal		Goal

6 August 1965 GANEFO	Indonesia	1–3	Cambodia	Pyongyang, North Korea
--:-- UTC+9	Goal		Goal

9 August 1965 GANEFO	North Korea	3–0	Indonesia	Pyongyang, North Korea
--:-- UTC+9	Goal

10 August 1965 GANEFO	North Vietnam	1–2	Indonesia	Pyongyang, North Korea
--:-- UTC+9	Goal		Goal

=== 1966 ===
10 December 1966 Asian Games GS	Indonesia	3–0	Singapore	Bangkok, Thailand
--:-- UTC+7	Goal

11 December 1966 Asian Games GS	Indonesia	0–0	South Vietnam	Bangkok, Thailand
--:-- UTC+7

14 December 1966 Asian Games GS	Taiwan	1–3	Indonesia	Bangkok, Thailand
--:-- UTC+7	Goal		Soentoro; Jacob Sihasale 68'; Surya Lesmana 75'

15 December 1966 Asian Games QF	Burma	2–2	Indonesia	Bangkok, Thailand
--:-- UTC+7	Soentoro		Goal

16 December 1966 Asian Games QF	Iran	1–0	Indonesia	Bangkok, Thailand
--:-- UTC+7	Goal

=== 1967 ===
27 July 1968 AFC Asian Cup qualification	South Korea	1–1	Indonesia	Taipei, Republic of China
--:-- UTC+8	Huh Yoon-Jung 34'		Manan 69' (pen.)	Stadium: Taipei Municipal Stadium

3 August 1968 AFC Asian Cup qualification	Taiwan	3–2	Indonesia	Taipei, Republic of China
--:-- UTC+8	Wong Chi-keung 5'; Mok Chun-wah 25'; Cheung Chi-day 43'		Soentoro 53', 73'	Stadium: Taipei Municipal Stadium

5 August 1968 AFC Asian Cup qualification	Japan	2–1	Indonesia	Taipei, Republic of China
--:-- UTC+8	Goal		Soentoro	Stadium: Taipei Municipal Stadium

7 August 1968 AFC Asian Cup qualification	Indonesia	6–0	Philippines	Taipei, Republic of China
--:-- UTC+8	Soentoro 38' 47' (?); Sihasale 52'; Andjiek Alinurdin 56'; Djunaedi Abdillah 68'			Stadium: Taipei Municipal Stadium

11 August 1967 Merdeka Tournament	South Korea	3–1	Indonesia	Kuala Lumpur, Malaysia
--:-- UTC+8	Hong In-Woong 20'; Huh Yoon-Jung 56'; Lee Hoi-Taek 63'		Abdul Kadir	Stadium: Stadium Merdeka; Referee: Luk Tat Sun (Hong Kong)

13 August 1967 Merdeka Tournament	Indonesia	4–1	Singapore	Kuala Lumpur, Malaysia
--:-- UTC+8	Tjan Peng Hong 27' 74' Kadir 31' Soentoro 70'		Majid Ariff 52' (pen.)	Stadium: Stadium Merdeka

15 August 1967 Merdeka Tournament	Taiwan	1–2	Indonesia	Kuala Lumpur, Malaysia
--:-- UTC+8	Goal		Goal	Stadium: Stadium Merdeka

19 August 1967 Merdeka Tournament	Indonesia	0–5	Myanmar	Kuala Lumpur, Malaysia
--:-- UTC+8			Goal	Stadium: Stadium Merdeka

23 August 1967 Merdeka Tournament	Indonesia	1–2	Hong Kong	Kuala Lumpur, Malaysia
--:-- UTC+8	Tjan Peng Hong 65'		Ken Wallis 12', 17'	Stadium: Stadium Merdeka

26 August 1967 Merdeka Tournament	Indonesia	3–0	India	Kuala Lumpur, Malaysia
--:-- UTC+8	Ojong Liza 31'; Soentoro 55'; Bob Permadi 74'			Stadium: Stadium Merdeka

18 November Friendly	Indonesia	0–2	Australia	Jakarta, Indonesia
--:-- UTC+7			Baartz 37'; Abonyi 43'	Stadium: Gelora Bung Karno Stadium; Attendance: 20,000

=== 1968 ===
18 January 1968 Summer Olympics qualification	Indonesia	2–1	Iraq	Bangkok, Thailand
--:-- UTC+7	Hong 32'; Sihasale 52'		Dhiab 54'	Stadium: Supachalasai Stadium; Attendance: 5,067; Referee: Govindasamy Suppiah (Singapore)

20 January 1968 Summer Olympics qualification	Thailand	2–1	Indonesia	Bangkok, Thailand
--:-- UTC+7	Goal		Goal	Stadium: Supachalasai Stadium

22 January 1968 Summer Olympics qualification	Iraq	1–1	Indonesia	Bangkok, Thailand
--:-- UTC+7	Dhiab 60'		Soentoro 22'	Stadium: Supachalasai Stadium; Attendance: 5,679; Referee: Norman Boswell (Malaysia)

24 January 1968 Summer Olympics qualification	Thailand	1–0	Indonesia	Bangkok, Thailand
--:-- UTC+7	Sornbutnark 10'			Stadium: Supachalasai Stadium; Attendance: 12,000

14 August 1968 Merdeka Tournament	Singapore	0–4	Indonesia	Kuala Lumpur, Malaysia
--:-- UTC+8			Soentoro 3', 86'; Idris 34'; Abdul Kadir 54'	Stadium: Stadium Merdeka

17 August 1968 Merdeka Tournament	South Korea	2–4	Indonesia	Kuala Lumpur, Malaysia
--:-- UTC+8	Kim Ki-Bok 42', 87'		Idris 3'; Abdul Kadir 15', 48'; Sihasale 60'	Stadium: Stadium Merdeka

19 August 1968 Merdeka Tournament	Taiwan	1–10	Indonesia	Kuala Lumpur, Malaysia
--:-- UTC+8	Chan Ciu Ki 35'		Soentoro 2', 19', 70'; Idris 9', 58', 72'; Tumsila 34', 84'; Abdul Kadir 44' (pen.), 66'	Stadium: Stadium Merdeka

22 August 1968 Merdeka Tournament SF	Indonesia	1–2	Burma	Kuala Lumpur, Malaysia
--:-- UTC+7	Sihasale 71'		Ye Nyunt 14', 34'	Stadium: Stadium Merdeka

21 November 1968 King's Cup	Malaysia	0–1	Indonesia	Bangkok, Thailand
--:-- UTC+7			Abdul Kadir 85'

24 November 1968 King's Cup	Indonesia	3–1	Burma	Bangkok, Thailand
--:-- UTC+7	Soentoro 25'; Abdul Kadir 34' (pen.), 47'		Tin Aung Moe 13'

26 November 1968 King's Cup	Singapore	0–7	Indonesia	Bangkok, Thailand
--:-- UTC+7			Abdul Kadir 5'; Soentoro 12', 35', 43'; Waskito 50'; Idris 70', 73'

28 November 1968 King's Cup	Indonesia	6–1	Malaysia	Bangkok, Thailand
--:-- UTC+7	Sihasale 10', 73'; Soentoro 12', 40', 64'; Mulyadi 34' (pen.)		Norbit 14'

2 December 1968 King's Cup Final	Indonesia	1–0	Burma	Bangkok, Thailand
--:-- UTC+7	Soentoro 20'

=== 1969 ===
1 November 1969 Merdeka Tournament	Thailand	0–4	Indonesia	Kuala Lumpur, Malaysia
--:-- UTC+8			Idris 14', 50', 75'; Abdul Kadir 88'	Stadium: Stadium Merdeka

3 November 1969 Merdeka Tournament	Malaysia	1–3	Indonesia	Kuala Lumpur, Malaysia
--:-- UTC+8	Shaharudddin 61'		Abdul Kadir 21', 48'; Sihasale 42'	Stadium: Stadium Merdeka

7 November 1969 Merdeka Tournament	Singapore	2–9	Indonesia	Kuala Lumpur, Malaysia
--:-- UTC+8	Quah Kim Lye 67'; Ng Keng Min 77'		Idris 13', 54'; Abdul Kadir 55', 62', 66'; Soentoro 56', 87', 89'; Sihasale 89'	Stadium: Stadium Merdeka

9 November 1969 Merdeka Tournament Final	Malaysia	2–3	Indonesia	Kuala Lumpur, Malaysia
--:-- UTC+8	Noordin 22' (pen.); Shaharuddin 28'		Soentoro 2', 35'; Sihasale 68'	Stadium: Stadium Merdeka; Attendance: 40,000; Referee: Maung Tin (Burma)

19 November 1969 King's Cup	Indonesia	2–3	Singapore	Bangkok, Thailand
--:-- UTC+7	Sihasale 13'; Abdul Kadir 50'		Quah Kim Swee 20', 23'; Rahmat bin Mohawar 62'

21 November 1969 King's Cup	Indonesia	3–1	South Vietnam	Bangkok, Thailand
--:-- UTC+7	Mulyadi 22' (pen.); Timisela 24'; Sihasale 80'		Quang Kim Phung 35'

26 November 1969 King's Cup	Indonesia	3–1	Laos	Bangkok, Thailand
--:-- UTC+7	Idris 4'; Soentoro 17', 82'		Goal

28 November 1969 King's Cup Final	Indonesia	0–1	South Korea	Bangkok, Thailand
--:-- UTC+7			Goal

=== 1970 ===
21 June 1970 Jakarta Anniversary Tournament	Indonesia	2–1	Hong Kong	Jakarta, Indonesia
--:-- UTC+7	Lesmana 33'; Budi Santoso 35'		Fok Pak Ling 28'	Stadium: Gelora Senayan Stadium

23 June 1970 Jakarta Anniversary Tournament	Indonesia	3–1	Western Australia	Jakarta, Indonesia
--:-- UTC+7	Waskito 48'; Budi Santoso 55'; Lesmana 88'		Alec Grant 60'	Stadium: Gelora Senayan Stadium; Attendance: 40,000

26 June 1970 Jakarta Anniversary Tournament SF	Indonesia	3–3 (a.e.t.) (2–3 p)	South Korea	Jakarta, Indonesia
--:-- UTC+7	Waskito 30'; Pattinasarany 89'; Lesmana 95'	report	Park Lee-chun 14' (pen.) 114'; Kang Chon-tai 20'	Stadium: Gelora Senayan Stadium

27 June 1970 Jakarta Anniversary Tournament	Indonesia	3–2	Hong Kong	Jakarta, Indonesia
--:-- UTC+7	Waskito 12', 48'; Djunaidi 32'		Ho Yeu Keung 60' (pen.), 80'	Stadium: Gelora Senayan Stadium

1 August 1970 Merdeka Tournament	Singapore	1–3	Indonesia	Kuala Lumpur, Malaysia
--:-- UTC+8	Sulaiman 5'		Soentoro 14', 29'; Abdul Kadir	Stadium: Stadium Merdeka

4 August 1970 Merdeka Tournament	Indonesia	3–1	Hong Kong	Kuala Lumpur, Malaysia
--:-- UTC+8	Abdul Kadir 62'; Idris 65'; 73'		56'	Stadium: Stadium Merdeka

6 August 1970 Merdeka Tournament	South Korea	2–1	Indonesia	Kuala Lumpur, Malaysia
--:-- UTC+8	Kim Chang-Il 48', 73'		Abdul Kadir 70'	Stadium: Stadium Merdeka

8 August 1970 Merdeka Tournament	Japan	4–3	Indonesia	Kuala Lumpur, Malaysia
--:-- UTC+8	Yoshimizu 40'; Aritatsu 56' (pen.), 60'; Yusuke 86'		Idris 43'; Timisela 47'; Abdul Kadir 50'	Stadium: Stadium Merdeka

10 August 1970 Merdeka Tournament	Thailand	3–6	Indonesia	Kuala Lumpur, Malaysia
--:-- UTC+8	Paholpat 20'; Niwat Srisawat 64', 77'		Soentoro 18', 42'; Idris 32', 67'; Timisela 56'; Kadir 86'	Stadium: Stadium Merdeka

15 August 1970 Merdeka Tournament	Malaysia	4–0	Indonesia	Kuala Lumpur, Malaysia
--:-- UTC+8	Abdullah 13'; Ali Bakar 15', 26', 47'			Stadium: Stadium Merdeka

29 October 1970 Quoc Khanh Cup	Thailand	2–1	Indonesia	Saigon, South Vietnam
--:-- UTC+7	Goal		Goal

31 October 1970 Quoc Khanh Cup	South Vietnam	3–1	Indonesia	Saigon, South Vietnam
--:-- UTC+7	Goal		Goal

1 November 1970 Quoc Khanh Cup	Malaysia	3–1	Indonesia	Saigon, South Vietnam
--:-- UTC+7	Goal		Goal

9 November 1970 King's Cup	Indonesia	5–3	South Vietnam	Bangkok, Thailand
--:-- UTC+8	Waskito 5', 12', 70'; Abdul Kadir 59', 63'		Cu Sinh 42'; Tran Tiet Van 88'	Stadium: Supachalasai Stadium

13 November 1970 King's Cup	Indonesia	3–0	Malaysia	Bangkok, Thailand
--:-- UTC+7	Abdul Kadir 13', 33'; Idris 17'			Stadium: Supachalasai Stadium

15 November 1970 King's Cup	Cambodia	2–4	Indonesia	Bangkok, Thailand
--:-- UTC+7	Doeur Sokhom 58'; Sieng Tara 88'		Soentoro 10'; Waskito 34', 55'; Idris 49'	Stadium: Supachalasai Stadium

18 November 1970 King's Cup SF	Indonesia	1–2	Thailand	Bangkok, Thailand
--:-- UTC+7	Goal		Goal	Stadium: Supachalasai Stadium; Attendance: 30,000

20 November 1970 King's Cup 3rd place	Malaysia	3–1	Indonesia	Bangkok, Thailand
--:-- UTC+7	S. Abdullah 19' (pen.), 23' (pen.), 75'		Idris 52'	Stadium: Supachalasai Stadium

10 December 1970 Asian Games GS	Indonesia	2–2	Iran	Bangkok, Thailand
--:-- UTC+7	Soentoro 71'; Idris 83'		Ashtiani 37'; Sharafi 77'	Stadium: Supachalasai Stadium

13 December 1970 Asian Games GS	South Korea	0–0	Indonesia	Bangkok, Thailand
--:-- UTC+7				Stadium: Supachalasai Stadium

15 December 1970 Asian Games QF	India	3–0	Indonesia	Bangkok, Thailand
--:-- UTC+7	Nataraj 74'; Rajvi 79'; Thapa 83'			Stadium: Supachalasai Stadium

16 December 1970 Asian Games QF	Indonesia	1–2	Japan	Bangkok, Thailand
--:-- UTC+7	Sihasale 74'		Kamamoto 40', 64'	Stadium: Supachalasai Stadium

19 December 1970 Asian Games 5th place	Indonesia	1–0	Thailand	Bangkok, Thailand
--:-- UTC+7	Abdul Kadir 32'			Stadium: Supachalasai Stadium

=== 1971 ===
2 May 1971 President's Cup	Indonesia	9–1	South Vietnam	Seoul, South Korea
16:30 UTC+9	Iswadi Idris		Goal	Stadium: Dongdaemun Stadium

5 May 1971 President's Cup	Hong Kong	1–2	Indonesia	Seoul, South Korea
18:00 UTC+9	85'	Report	Djunaedi Abdillah 2'; Kadir 65'	Stadium: Dongdaemun Stadium

8 May 1971 President's Cup	Burma	3–1	Indonesia	Seoul, South Korea
16:50 UTC+9	Maung Maung Tin 57' (pen.); Than Soe 75'; Win Maung 87'	Report	Abdul Kadir 11' (pen.)	Stadium: Dongdaemun Stadium

11 May 1971 President's Cup	South Korea	3–0	Indonesia	Seoul, South Korea
--:-- UTC+9	Chung Kyu-poong 12', 66'; 31' (o.g.)	Report		Stadium: Dongdaemun Stadium

13 May 1971 President's Cup	Indonesia	4–2	Malaysia	Seoul, South Korea
17:00 UTC+9	Idris 20', 24'; (o.g.); Sihasale	Report	Namat 32'; Salleh	Stadium: Dongdaemun Stadium

22 May 1972 AFC Asian Cup qualification	Indonesia	2–1	Hong Kong	Bangkok, Thailand
--:-- UTC+7	Budi Santoso 4'	Report	Goal

26 May 1972 AFC Asian Cup qualification	Indonesia	1–0	Thailand	Bangkok, Thailand
--:-- UTC+7	Djunaedi Abdillah 44'

28 May 1972 AFC Asian Cup qualification	Indonesia	9–0	Brunei	Bangkok, Thailand
--:-- UTC+7	Djunaedi Abdillah 7'; Andi Lala; Karno Wahid; Saleh Ramadaud; Budiman

30 May 1972 AFC Asian Cup qualification	Khmer Republic	2–0	Indonesia	Bangkok, Thailand
--:-- UTC+7	Goal

1 June 1972 AFC Asian Cup qualification	Malaysia	3–0	Indonesia	Bangkok, Thailand
--:-- UTC+7	Goal

5 June 1971 Jakarta Anniversary Tournament	Indonesia	3–0	Singapore	Jakarta, Indonesia
--:-- UTC+7	Idris 3', 12'; Abdul Kadir 78'			Stadium: Gelora Senayan Stadium; Attendance: 60,000

7 June 1971 Jakarta Anniversary Tournament	Indonesia	1–1	Burma	Jakarta, Indonesia
--:-- UTC+7	Abdul Kadir 36'		Khin Maing Tint 16'	Stadium: Gelora Senayan Stadium

11 June 1971 Jakarta Anniversary Tournament	Indonesia	0–0	Thailand	Jakarta, Indonesia
--:-- UTC+7				Stadium: Gelora Senayan Stadium

13 June 1971 Jakarta Anniversary Tournament	Indonesia	1–0	Khmer Republic	Jakarta, Indonesia
--:-- UTC+7	Abdul Kadir 74'			Stadium: Gelora Senayan Stadium

14 June 1971 Jakarta Anniversary Tournament	Indonesia	2–1	Malaysia	Jakarta, Indonesia
--:-- UTC+7	Idris 40'; Djuanedi 88'		Hamzah Hussein 33'	Stadium: Gelora Senayan Stadium; Attendance: 75,000; Referee: Kim Yin-Young (South Korea)

16 June 1971 Jakarta Anniversary Tournament Final	Indonesia	0–1	Burma	Jakarta, Indonesia
--:-- UTC+7			Win Maung 85'	Stadium: Gelora Senayan Stadium; Attendance: 90,000

8 August 1971 Merdeka Tournament	India	1–3	Indonesia	Kuala Lumpur, Malaysia
--:-- UTC+8	Mohammed Habib 42'		Waskito 1', 55', 58'	Stadium: Stadium Merdeka

9 August 1971 Merdeka Tournament	Indonesia	2–2	Burma	Kuala Lumpur, Malaysia
--:-- UTC+8	Abdul Kadir 58', 79'		Win Nyunt 38'; Hla Tay 82'	Stadium: Stadium Merdeka

11 August 1971 Merdeka Tournament	Indonesia	3–1	Philippines	Kuala Lumpur, Malaysia
--:-- UTC+8	Waskito 5'; Sihasale 22'; Djuanedi 70'		Miguel Crame 32'	Stadium: Stadium Merdeka

13 August 1971 Merdeka Tournament	Indonesia	4–0	Singapore	Perak, Malaysia
--:-- UTC+8	Waskito 17', 63', 70'; Abdul Kadir 33'			Stadium: Perak Stadium

15 August 1971 Merdeka Tournament	Indonesia	3–0	Hong Kong	Perak, Malaysia
--:-- UTC+8	Pattinasarany 12'; Budi Santoso 20'; Djunaedi Abdillah 52'			Stadium: Perak Stadium

18 August 1971 Merdeka Tournament	Indonesia	1–0	Taiwan	Kuala Lumpur, Malaysia
--:-- UTC+8	Sihasale 39'			Stadium: Stadium Merdeka; Attendance: 16,500

21 August 1971 Merdeka Tournament Final	Burma	1–0	Indonesia	Kuala Lumpur, Malaysia
--:-- UTC+8	Hla Tay 22'			Stadium: Stadium Merdeka

23 August 1971 Pesta Sukan Cup	India	2–1	Indonesia	Kallang, Singapore
--:-- UTC+8	Habib		Goal	Stadium: Jalan Besar Stadium

27 August 1971 Pesta Sukan Cup	Singapore	3–2	Indonesia	Kallang, Singapore
--:-- UTC+8	Lim Lye Huat 26'; Kassim 52' (pen.); Khrisnan 60'	Report	Abdul Kadir 42'; Suaib 75'	Stadium: Jalan Besar Stadium

10 November 1971 King's Cup	Indonesia	2–0	Malaysia	Bangkok, Thailand
--:-- UTC+7	Tumsila 36'; Abdul Kadir 50'	Report		Referee: Charoen Nirikanond (Thailand)

12 November 1971 King's Cup	South Korea	0–0	Indonesia	Bangkok, Thailand
--:-- UTC+7

14 November 1971 King's Cup SF	Thailand	1–0	Indonesia	Bangkok, Thailand
--:-- UTC+7

16 November 1971 King's Cup 3rd place	South Vietnam	3–2	Indonesia	Bangkok, Thailand
--:-- UTC+7

=== 1972 ===
20 March 1972 Summer Olympics qualification	Indonesia	4–0	Thailand	Rangoon, Burma
--:-- UTC+6:30	Sihasale 13', 69'; Idris 49'; Abdul Kadir 82'	Report		Stadium: Bogyoke Aung San Stadium

25 March 1972 Summer Olympics qualification	Indonesia	4–2	India	Rangoon, Burma
--:-- UTC+6:30	Sihasale 10'; Waskito 16', 38'; Abdul Kadir 75'	Report	S.Chowdhury 57'; D.Nataraj 89'	Stadium: Bogyoke Aung San Stadium

30 March 1972 Summer Olympics qualification	Israel	1–0	Indonesia	Rangoon, Burma
--:-- UTC+6:30	Sarusi 47'	Report		Stadium: Bogyoke Aung San Stadium

2 April 1972 Summer Olympics qualification	Burma	3–0	Indonesia	Rangoon, Burma
--:-- UTC+6:30	Win Maung 16', 52'; Ye Nyunt 59'	Report		Stadium: Bogyoke Aung San Stadium

5 June 1972 Jakarta Anniversary Tournament	Indonesia	1–0	Burma	Jakarta, Indonesia
--:-- UTC+7	Risdianto 65'			Stadium: Gelora Senayan Stadium; Attendance: 40,000

7 June 1972 Jakarta Anniversary Tournament	Indonesia	5–1	Laos	Jakarta, Indonesia
--:-- UTC+7	Idris 10', 25'; Abdul Kadir 23', 78'; Risdianto 30'		Anwar Udjang 3' (o.g.)	Stadium: Gelora Senayan Stadium; Attendance: 25.000; Referee: Valentino Bartholomeo (Philippines)

11 June 1972 Jakarta Anniversary Tournament	Indonesia	8–0	Sri Lanka	Jakarta, Indonesia
--:-- UTC+7	Sihasale 1' 42' 60'; Waskito 32'; Abdul Kadir 66' 72'; Risdianto 48' 88'			Stadium: Gelora Senayan Stadium

13 June 1972 Jakarta Anniversary Tournament	Indonesia	3–0	Malaysia	Jakarta, Indonesia
--:-- UTC+7	Abdul Kadir 30' (pen.), 77'; Risdianto 65'			Stadium: Gelora Senayan Stadium; Attendance: 60,000

17 June 1972 Jakarta Anniversary Tournament	Indonesia	4–0	Khmer Republic	Jakarta, Indonesia
--:-- UTC+7	Pattinasarany; Risdianto; Idris; Abdul Kadir			Stadium: Gelora Senayan Stadium

13 July 1972 Merdeka Tournament	Indonesia	0–0	Singapore	Kuala Lumpur, Malaysia
--:-- UTC+8				Stadium: Stadium Merdeka; Referee: Thaung Tin (Burma)

19 July 1972 Merdeka Tournament	Thailand	2–3	Indonesia	Kuala Lumpur, Malaysia
--:-- UTC+8	Sudsaraat 12', 84'		Panggabean 50'; Tumsila 64', 79'	Stadium: Stadium Merdeka; Referee: T. Kimura (Japan)

21 July 1972 Merdeka Tournament	Hong Kong	1–0	Indonesia	Kuala Lumpur, Malaysia
--:-- UTC+8	Wong Tak Choi 89'			Stadium: Stadium Merdeka

23 July 1972 Merdeka Tournament	South Korea	2–0	Indonesia	Kuala Lumpur, Malaysia
--:-- UTC+8	Lee Hoi-taek 51'; Cha Bum-kun 56'			Stadium: Stadium Merdeka; Referee: H.S Dhillon (Singapore)

2 August 1972 Pesta Sukan Cup	Indonesia	3–0	Singapore	Kallang, Singapore
--:-- UTC+8	Risdianto 11', 57'; Abdul Kadir 32'			Stadium: Jalan Besar Stadium; Attendance: 3,000

6 August 1972 Pesta Sukan Cup	Indonesia	1–0	Japan	Kallang, Singapore
--:-- UTC+8	Risdianto 38'			Stadium: Jalan Besar Stadium; Attendance: 8,000

8 August 1972 Pesta Sukan Cup	Indonesia	5–0	Khmer Republic	Kallang, Singapore
--:-- UTC+8	Risdianto 6'; Abdul Kadir 11', 54'; Sihasale 49'; Waskito 86'			Stadium: Jalan Besar Stadium; Attendance: 3,000

21 September 1972 President's Cup	Indonesia	2–1	Singapore	Seoul, South Korea
--:-- UTC+9	Abdul Kadir 26', 87' (pen.)	Report	M. Kumar 73'

23 September 1972 President's Cup	Burma	1–1	Indonesia	Seoul, South Korea
--:-- UTC+9	Aye Maung 88'	Report	Idris 54'

25 September 1972 President's Cup	Philippines	0–12	Indonesia	Seoul, South Korea
--:-- UTC+9		Report	Idris 3' 14' 56' (?); Sihasale 6'; Abdul Kadir 22', 30'; Budi Santoso 25', 68'; Risdianto; Yuswardi; Djunaedi Abdillah

27 September 1972 President's Cup	Indonesia	3–1 (a.e.t.)	Malaysia	Seoul, South Korea
--:-- UTC+9	Waskito 56'; Abdul Kadir 114', 118' (pen.)	Report	Shaharuddin 9'

30 September 1972 President's Cup Final	Burma	3–1	Indonesia	Seoul, South Korea
--:-- UTC+9	Win Maung 35', 69', 78'	Report	Risdianto 53'	Stadium: Dongdaemun Stadium

7 October Friendly	Indonesia	1–4	Australia	Jakarta, Indonesia
--:-- UTC+7	Abdul Kadir 83' (pen.)	Report	Branko Buljevic 52', 88'; Tolson 60'; Baartz 78' (pen.)	Stadium: Gelora Senayan Stadium; Attendance: 11,258; Referee: Achmad Karim (Indonesia)

11 October Friendly	Indonesia	1–1	New Zealand	Jakarta, Indonesia
--:-- UTC+7	Abdul Kadir 88' (pen.)		David Taylor	Stadium: Gelora Senayan Stadium

=== 1973 ===
4 February Friendly	Indonesia	0–4	Bulgaria	Jakarta, Indonesia
19:00 UTC+7		Report	Mihaylov 45', 61'; Dermendzhiev 59', 75'	Stadium: Gelora Senayan Stadium; Referee: Ahmed Karim (Indonesia)

11 March 1974 FIFA World Cup qualification	Indonesia	1–1	New Zealand	Sydney, Australia
--:-- UTC+10	Sarman Panggabean 13'		Alan Vest 74'	Stadium: Sydney Sports Ground; Attendance: 28,514; Referee: K. Mahendran (Malaysia)

13 March 1974 FIFA World Cup qualification	Australia	2–1	Indonesia	Sydney, Australia
--:-- UTC+10	Campbell 23'; Alston 42'		Idris 36'	Stadium: Sydney Sports Ground; Attendance: 12,763; Referee: Dau Van Dzu (South Vietnam)

16 March 1974 FIFA World Cup qualification	Iraq	1–1	Indonesia	Sydney, Australia
--:-- UTC+10	Kadhim 23'		Idris 43'	Stadium: Sydney Sports Ground; Attendance: 14,071; Referee: Kim Joo-Wom (South Korea)

18 March 1974 FIFA World Cup qualification	Indonesia	1–0	New Zealand	Melbourne, Australia
--:-- UTC+10	Tillotson 7' (o.g.)			Stadium: Olympic Park; Attendance: 10,684; Referee: Govindasamy Suppiah (Singapore)

21 March 1974 FIFA World Cup qualification	Iraq	3–2	Indonesia	Sydney, Australia
--:-- UTC+10	Aziz 22' (pen.); Obeid 33'; Nouri 72'		Sarman Panggabean 25'; Anjas Asmara 58'	Stadium: Sydney Sports Ground; Attendance: 2,000; Referee: Luk Tat Sun (Hong Kong)

24 March 1974 FIFA World Cup qualification	Australia	6–0	Indonesia	Sydney, Australia
--:-- UTC+10	Mackay 3', 40'; Abonyi 23', 54'; Richards 72'; Baartz 78'			Stadium: Sydney Sports Ground; Attendance: 12,390; Referee: Masatoshi Nagashima (Japan)

12 June 1973 Jakarta Anniversary Tournament	Indonesia	0–1	South Korea	Jakarta, Indonesia
--:-- UTC+7			Kim Jae-han 20'	Stadium: Gelora Senayan Stadium

14 June 1973 Jakarta Anniversary Tournament	Indonesia	2–0	Malaysia	Jakarta, Indonesia
--:-- UTC+7	Idris 24'; Sihasale 87'			Stadium: Gelora Senayan Stadium; Attendance: 40,000

17 June 1973 Jakarta Anniversary Tournament	Indonesia	0–0	Burma	Jakarta, Indonesia
--:-- UTC+7				Stadium: Gelora Senayan Stadium

24 September 1973 President's Cup	South Korea	3–1	Indonesia	Seoul, South Korea
--:-- UTC+9	Kim Jae-han 11', 79'; Kim Jin-kook 73'	Report	Abdul Kadir 21'	Stadium: Dongdaemun Stadium; Attendance: 30,000

26 September 1973 President's Cup	Indonesia	2–3	Khmer Republic	Seoul, South Korea
--:-- UTC+9	Anjas Asmara 4'; Abdul Kadir 88'	Report	Sea 47', 57'; Chin 59'	Stadium: Dongdaemun Stadium

=== 1974 ===
21 April Friendly	Indonesia	2–3	Uruguay	Jakarta, Indonesia
--:-- UTC+7	Nobon Kayamudin 18'; Abdul Kadir 61' (pen.)	Report	Fernando Morena 5', 50'; Denis Milar 44'	Stadium: Gelora Senayan Stadium; Attendance: 60,000

21 May Friendly	Indonesia	1–2	Australia	Jakarta, Indonesia
--:-- UTC+7	Waskito 89'		Peter Wilson 77'; Col Curran 80'	Stadium: Gelora Senayan Stadium; Attendance: 62,000; Referee: Juremi (Indonesia)

1 June 1974 Jakarta Anniversary Tournament	Indonesia	2–4	Burma	Jakarta, Indonesia
--:-- UTC+7	Abdul Kadir 14'; Pattinasarany 24'		Aye Maung 8'; Maung Thein Aung 50'; Maung Tin 52'; Maung Khin Lay 68'	Stadium: Gelora Senayan Stadium; Attendance: 75,000

3 June 1974 Jakarta Anniversary Tournament	Indonesia	2–1	South Korea	Jakarta, Indonesia
--:-- UTC+7	Abdul Kadir 19'; Risdianto 67'		Ho Min-Koo 85'	Stadium: Gelora Senayan Stadium; Attendance: 32,000

7 June 1974 Jakarta Anniversary Tournament	Indonesia	4–3	Malaysia	Jakarta, Indonesia
--:-- UTC+7	Abdul Kadir 5', 21', 70'; Waskito 12'	Report	Mohammed Bakar 7'; Mokhtar Dahari 31' 34'	Stadium: Gelora Senayan Stadium

9 June 1974 Jakarta Anniversary Tournament	Indonesia	3–0	Japan	Jakarta, Indonesia
--:-- UTC+7	Goal			Stadium: Gelora Senayan Stadium

24 July 1974 Merdeka Tournament	Indonesia	2–2	Hong Kong	Kuala Lumpur, Malaysia
--:-- UTC+8	Yuswardi 47'; Wibisono 53'		Chung Chor Wai 9'; Yu Kwok Tit 21'	Stadium: Stadium Merdeka

26 July 1974 Merdeka Tournament	Indonesia	1–2	Thailand	Kuala Lumpur, Malaysia
--:-- UTC+8	Andi Lala 90+1'		Niwat Srisawat 67'; Praphon 88'	Stadium: Stadium Merdeka

28 July 1974 Merdeka Tournament	Indonesia	5–0	Singapore	Kuala Lumpur, Malaysia
--:-- UTC+8	Kayamuddin 6'; Andi Lala 24'; Wibisono 54', 56'; Abdul Kadir 85'			Stadium: Stadium Merdeka

1 August 1974 Merdeka Tournament	India	0–0 (2–4 p)	Indonesia	Kuala Lumpur, Malaysia
--:-- UTC+8				Stadium: Stadium Merdeka

3 September Friendly	Denmark	9–0	Indonesia	Copenhagen, Denmark
--:-- UTC+2	Holmstrom 15', 41', 71'; Henning Jensen 17', 35', 76'; Kristensen Nygaard 22' (pen.); Allan Simonsen 29'; Niels Sorensen 86'	Report		Stadium: Idrætspark; Attendance: 6,700; Referee: Rolf Arnshed (Sweden)

8 December Friendly	Indonesia	1–1	Czechoslovakia	Jakarta, Indonesia
--:-- UTC+7	Goal		Goal	Stadium: Gelora Senayan Stadium

25 December Friendly	South Korea	3–1	Indonesia	Hong Kong
--:-- UTC+8	Goal		Goal

=== 1975 ===
15 March 1976 AFC Asian Cup qualification	Thailand	3–1	Indonesia	Bangkok, Thailand
--:-- UTC+7	Jesdaporn 60', 66'; Pallop Maklamthong 88'		Prajrit Pangdee 70' (o.g.)

17 March 1976 AFC Asian Cup qualification	Indonesia	2–1	South Vietnam	Bangkok, Thailand
--:-- UTC+7	Wibisono 9', 13'		Goal

20 March 1976 AFC Asian Cup qualification	Malaysia	0–0	Indonesia	Bangkok, Thailand
--:-- UTC+7

22 March 1976 AFC Asian Cup qualification	South Korea	1–0	Indonesia	Bangkok, Thailand
--:-- UTC+7	Goal

12 June 1975 Jakarta Anniversary Tournament	Indonesia	5–0	Thailand	Jakarta, Indonesia
--:-- UTC+7	Goal			Stadium: Gelora Senayan Stadium

14 June 1975 Jakarta Anniversary Tournament	Indonesia	3–1	Malaysia	Jakarta, Indonesia
--:-- UTC+7	Goal		Goal	Stadium: Gelora Senayan Stadium

17 June 1975 Jakarta Anniversary Tournament	Indonesia	0–2	Burma	Jakarta, Indonesia
--:-- UTC+7			Khin Maung Tint	Stadium: Gelora Senayan Stadium

19 June 1975 Jakarta Anniversary Tournament	Indonesia	3–2	South Korea	Jakarta, Indonesia
--:-- UTC+7	Goal		Goal	Stadium: Gelora Senayan Stadium

29 July 1975 Merdeka Tournament	Indonesia	4–0	Bangladesh	Kuala Lumpur, Malaysia
--:-- UTC+8	Djunaedi 2', 24'; Waskito 7', 80'			Stadium: Stadium Merdeka

1 August 1975 Merdeka Tournament	Indonesia	0–2	Burma	Kuala Lumpur, Malaysia
--:-- UTC+8			Maung Than Soe 1'; Maung Tien Sein 35'	Stadium: Stadium Merdeka

3 August 1975 Merdeka Tournament	Indonesia	3–2	Hong Kong	Kuala Lumpur, Malaysia
--:-- UTC+8	Risdianto 71'; Waskito 80', 86'		Fu Chi Ming 16', 37'	Stadium: Stadium Merdeka

7 August 1975 Merdeka Tournament	Indonesia	1–4	Japan	Kuala Lumpur, Malaysia
--:-- UTC+8	Waskito 20'		Kamamoto 32', 38'; Fujishima 34'; Maeda 89'	Stadium: Stadium Merdeka

9 August 1975 Merdeka Tournament	Indonesia	2–1	Thailand	Kuala Lumpur, Malaysia
--:-- UTC+8	Risdianto 55'; Andi Lala 67'		Chaivat 88'	Stadium: Stadium Merdeka

11 August 1975 Merdeka Tournament	Indonesia	1–5	South Korea	Kuala Lumpur, Malaysia
--:-- UTC+8	Djunaedi 89' (pen.)		Cha Bum-kun 22'; Cho Dong-hyun 39', 59'; Yoo Dong-chun 81'; Park Sung-hwa 83'	Stadium: Stadium Merdeka

14 August 1975 Merdeka Tournament	Indonesia	1–2	Malaysia	Kuala Lumpur, Malaysia
--:-- UTC+8	Kayamuddin 87'		Isa Bakar 43'; Shukor Salleh 85'	Stadium: Stadium Merdeka

=== 1976 ===
15 February 1976 Summer Olympics qualification	Indonesia	0–0	Singapore	Jakarta, Indonesia
--:-- UTC+7				Stadium: Gelora Senayan Stadium

17 February 1976 Summer Olympics qualification	Indonesia	8–2	Papua New Guinea	Jakarta, Indonesia
--:-- UTC+7	Abdillah 6' 38' 71' 83'; Waskito 12'; Idris 42'; Risdianto 61'; Asmara 64'		Willi Seph 50'; Stalin Aupai 52'	Stadium: Gelora Senayan Stadium; Attendance: 45,000

20 February 1976 Summer Olympics qualification	North Korea	2–1	Indonesia	Jakarta, Indonesia
--:-- UTC+7	An Sen Uk 59'; Hong Song Nam 72'		Johannes Auri 61'	Stadium: Gelora Senayan Stadium; Attendance: 100,000

24 February 1976 Summer Olympics qualification	Indonesia	2–1	Malaysia	Jakarta, Indonesia
--:-- UTC+7	Idris 23'; Risdianto 58'		Isa Bakar 29'	Stadium: Gelora Senayan Stadium; Attendance: 120,000; Referee: Tadashi Kimura (Japan)

26 February 1976 Summer Olympics qualification	Indonesia	0–0 (a.e.t.) (4–5 p)	North Korea	Jakarta, Indonesia
--:-- UTC+7				Stadium: Gelora Senayan Stadium; Attendance: 120,000
	Penalties
	Idris (penalty scored); Djunaedi (penalty scored); Waskito (penalty scored); Oyong Liza (penalty missed); Anjas Asmara (penalty missed); Risdianto (penalty scored); Suaeb Rizal (penalty missed)		(penalty scored) An Sek Uk; (penalty missed) Park Jo Hun; (penalty scored) Mak Jong U; (penalty scored) Yang Sok Guk; (penalty missed) Kim Jong Min; (penalty scored) Kim Zung Gon; (penalty scored) Hong Song Nam

11 June 1976 Jakarta Anniversary Tournament	Indonesia	1–2	Malaysia	Jakarta, Indonesia
--:-- UTC+7	TImo Kapisa 18'		Abdah Alif 61'; John Engkatesu 80'	Stadium: Gelora Senayan Stadium

12 June 1976 Jakarta Anniversary Tournament	Indonesia	1–1	Burma	Jakarta, Indonesia
--:-- UTC+7	Goal		Goal	Stadium: Gelora Senayan Stadium

20 October Friendly	Indonesia	1–1	Australia	Jakarta, Indonesia
--:-- UTC+7	Rizal 83'		Abonyi 5'	Stadium: Gelora Senayan Stadium

10 December Friendly	Indonesia	0–0	Soviet Union	Jakarta, Indonesia
--:-- UTC+7				Stadium: Gelora Senayan Stadium

=== 1977 ===
28 February 1978 FIFA World Cup qualification	Hong Kong	4–1	Indonesia	Kallang, Singapore
--:-- UTC+8	Chung Chor Wai 61' (pen.); Wun Chee Keung 67'; Kwok Ka Ming 71'; Lau Wing Yip 83'		Waskito 12'	Stadium: National Stadium; Referee: Namdar (Iran)

3 March 1978 FIFA World Cup qualification	Indonesia	0–0	Malaysia	Kallang, Singapore
--:-- UTC+7				Stadium: National Stadium; Referee: Asami (Japan)

7 March 1978 FIFA World Cup qualification	Thailand	3–2	Indonesia	Kallang, Singapore
--:-- UTC+8	Chaiyabutr 27'; Na Phatalung 30' (pen.); Srisawat 36'		Risdianto 44'; Djunaedi 70'	Stadium: National Stadium; Referee: Alex Vaz (India)

9 March 1978 FIFA World Cup qualification	Singapore	0–4	Indonesia	Kallang, Singapore
--:-- UTC+8			Pattinasarany 4'; Anjas Asmara 13'; Andi Lala 26'; Idris 48'	Stadium: National Stadium; Referee: Kim Joo-Won (South Korea)

19 November 1977 Sea Games GS	Malaysia	1–2	Indonesia	Kuala Lumpur, Malaysia
--:-- UTC+8	Abdah Alif 88'		Idris 28'; Ismanto 82'	Stadium: Stadium Merdeka

22 November 1977 Sea Games GS	Indonesia	4–0	Brunei	Kuala Lumpur, Malaysia
--:-- UTC+7	Idris			Stadium: Stadium Merdeka

23 November 1977 Sea Games GS	Philippines	1–1	Indonesia	Kuala Lumpur, Malaysia
--:-- UTC+8	Goal		Goal	Stadium: Stadium Merdeka

25 November 1977 Sea Games SF	Indonesia	0–2*	Thailand	Kuala Lumpur, Malaysia
--:-- UTC+8				Stadium: Stadium Merdeka; Referee: Othman Omar (Malaysia)
Note: *The match was abandoned in the 60th minute with the score at 1–1 because of an all-in brawl. The Disciplinary Committee found the Indonesian team guilty of violent conduct and awarded the match to Thailand.

26 November 1977 Sea Games Bronze Medal	Burma	2–0*	Indonesia	Kuala Lumpur, Malaysia
--:-- UTC+8				Stadium: Stadium Merdeka
Note: *Indonesia did not arrive at the appointed time; after waiting for 15 minutes, the referee abandoned the match and referred the matter to the technical committee. The bronze medal was awarded to Burma.

=== 1978 ===
13 June 1978 Jakarta Anniversary Tournament	Indonesia	3–0	Malaysia	Jakarta, Indonesia
--:-- UTC+7	Abdul Kadir 29', 33', 37'	Report		Stadium: Gelora Senayan Stadium; Attendance: 70,000

15 June 1978 Jakarta Anniversary Tournament	Indonesia	1–0	Thailand	Jakarta, Indonesia
--:-- UTC+7	Anjas Asmara 54'	Report		Stadium: Gelora Senayan Stadium; Attendance: 40.000; Referee: Bala Subramaniam (Singapore)

22 June 1978 Jakarta Anniversary Tournament	Indonesia	2–2	Singapore	Jakarta, Indonesia
--:-- UTC+7	Timo Kapisa 36'; Risdianto 60' (pen.)	Report	S. Manoharan 64', 86'	Stadium: Gelora Senayan Stadium; Attendance: 500

13 July 1978 Merdeka Tournament	Indonesia	1–0	Syria	Kuala Lumpur, Malaysia
--:-- UTC+8	Timo Kapisa 51'	Report		Stadium: Stadium Merdeka

15 July 1978 Merdeka Tournament	Indonesia	2–1	Japan	Kuala Lumpur, Malaysia
--:-- UTC+8	Timo Kapisa 66', 68'	Report	Nobuo Fujishima 25'	Stadium: Stadium Merdeka

17 July 1978 Merdeka Tournament	Iraq	4–0	Indonesia	Kuala Lumpur, Malaysia
--:-- UTC+9	Goal	Report		Stadium: Stadium Merdeka

19 July 1978 Merdeka Tournament	Malaysia	1–0	Indonesia	Kuala Lumpur, Malaysia
--:-- UTC+9	Goal	Report		Stadium: Stadium Merdeka

22 July 1978 Merdeka Tournament	Thailand	3–0	Indonesia	Kuala Lumpur, Malaysia
--:-- UTC+9	Goal	Report		Stadium: Stadium Merdeka

25 July 1978 Merdeka Tournament	South Korea	2–0	Indonesia	Kuala Lumpur, Malaysia
--:-- UTC+9	Goal	Report		Stadium: Stadium Merdeka

27 July 1978 Merdeka Tournament	Indonesia	0–0	Singapore	Kuala Lumpur, Malaysia
--:-- UTC+8		Report		Stadium: Stadium Merdeka

10 September 1978 President's Cup	Indonesia	0–2	Thailand	Jeonju, South Korea
--:-- UTC+8			Boonlert Iewchareon 15'; Pichai Kongsri 37'	Stadium: Jeonju Sports Complex

=== 1979 ===
1 May 1980 AFC Asian Cup qualification	Thailand	3–1	Indonesia	Bangkok, Thailand
--:-- UTC+7	Dara 13'; Jesdaporn Napathalung 49'; Manus Ratanatisoi 80'		Andi Lala 39'

5 May 1980 AFC Asian Cup qualification	Malaysia	4–1	Indonesia	Bangkok, Thailand
--:-- UTC+7	Singh 35'; Wong 51'; Ibni 55'; Dahari 88'		Idris 71'

7 May 1980 AFC Asian Cup qualification	North Korea	3–1	Indonesia	Bangkok, Thailand
--:-- UTC+7	Pak Jong-hun 22', 75'; Hong Song-nam 32'		Andi Lala 35'

31 May 1979 Kirin Cup	Japan	4–0	Indonesia	Tokyo, Japan
--:-- UTC+9		Report		Stadium: Nishigaoka Soccer Stadium

30 June 1979 Merdeka Tournament	Indonesia	0–0	Singapore	Kuala Lumpur, Malaysia
--:-- UTC+7		Report		Stadium: Stadium Merdeka

4 July 1979 Merdeka Tournament	Malaysia	1–1	Indonesia	Kuala Lumpur, Malaysia
--:-- UTC+8	Shukor Salleh 12'		Dede Sulaeman 68'	Stadium: Stadium Merdeka

8 July 1979 Merdeka Tournament	Indonesia	2–1	Thailand	Kuala Lumpur, Malaysia
--:-- UTC+7	Sofyan Hadi 25'; Harry Muryanto 88'	Report	Vithaya Laohakul 90+1'	Stadium: Stadium Merdeka

11 July 1979 Merdeka Tournament	Japan	0–0	Indonesia	Kuala Lumpur, Malaysia
--:-- UTC+8				Stadium: Stadium Merdeka

13 July 1979 Merdeka Tournament	Burma	4–0	Indonesia	Kuala Lumpur, Malaysia
--:-- UTC+8	Maung Maung Nu 66', 74'; Ishak Liza 70' (o.g.); Maung Pauk Si 88'			Stadium: Stadium Merdeka

22 September 1979 Sea Games GS	Indonesia	3–0	Singapore	Jakarta, Indonesia
--:-- UTC+7	Idris 52'; Risdianto 64'; Nere 80'			Stadium: Gelora Senayan Stadium

23 September 1979 Sea Games GS	Indonesia	1–3	Thailand	Jakarta, Indonesia
--:-- UTC+7	Dede Sulaeman 24'		Chuayboonchum 48', 72'; Sittiporn 58'	Stadium: Gelora Senayan Stadium

26 September 1979 Sea Games GS	Indonesia	0–0	Malaysia	Jakarta, Indonesia
--:-- UTC+7				Stadium: Gelora Senayan Stadium

28 September 1979 Sea Games GS	Indonesia	2–1	Burma	Jakarta, Indonesia
--:-- UTC+7	Risdianto 29'; Idris 57'		Than WIn 12'	Stadium: Gelora Senayan Stadium

29 September 1979 Sea Games Second place PO	Indonesia	0–0 (3–1 p)	Thailand	Jakarta, Indonesia
--:-- UTC+7				Stadium: Gelora Senayan Stadium
	Penalties
	Idris (penalty scored); Berti Tutuarima (penalty scored); Djoko Malis (penalty scored)		(penalty scored) Jesdaporn Napatalung; (penalty missed) Daoyod Dara; (penalty missed) Boonlert Eowchareon

30 September 1979 Sea Games Gold Medal	Indonesia	0–1	Malaysia	Jakarta, Indonesia
--:-- UTC+7			Mokhtar 21'	Stadium: Gelora Senayan Stadium; Attendance: 85,000
