= Indonesia–Vietnam football rivalry =

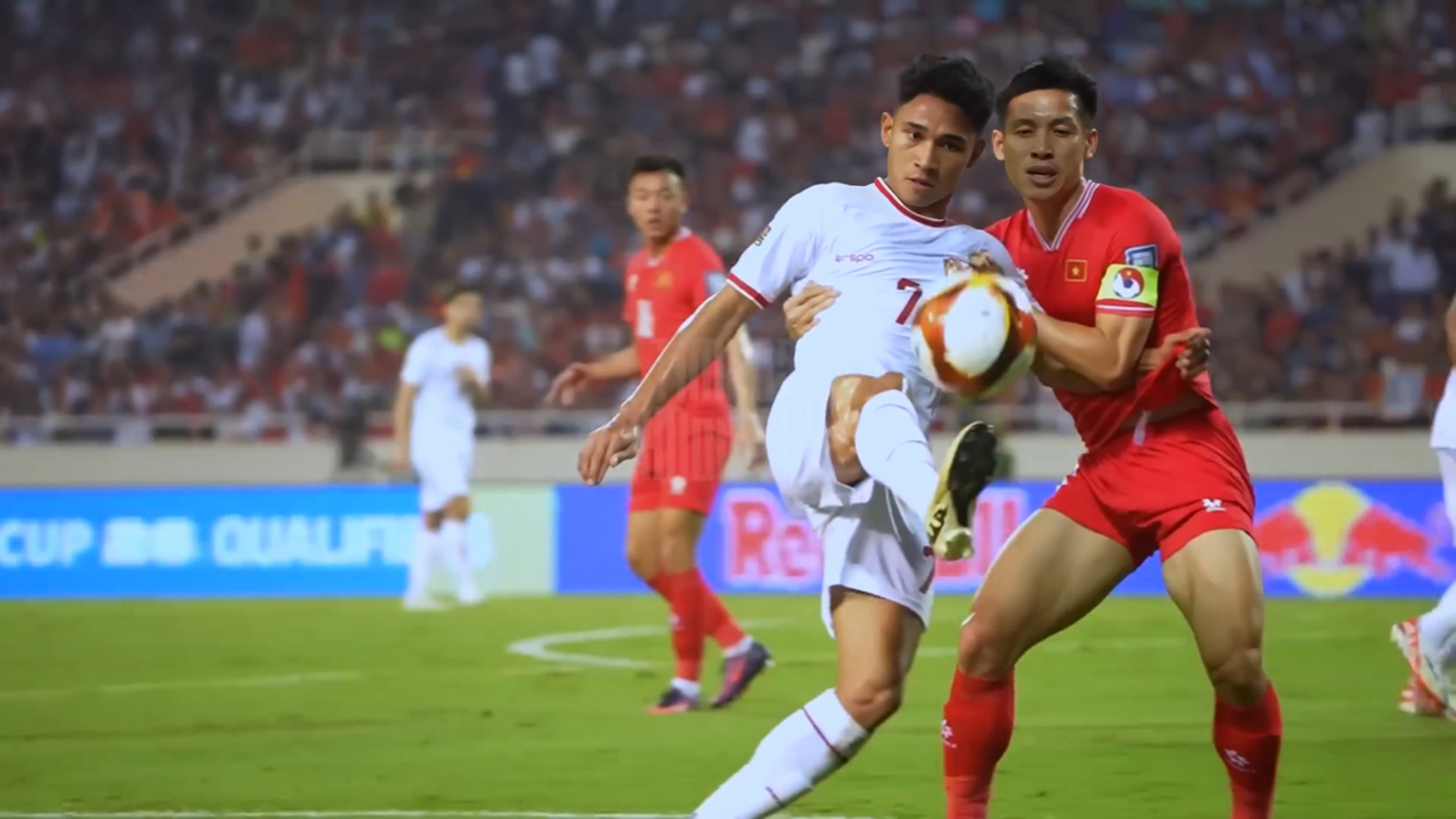
- Indonesia's Marselino Ferdinan (left) and Vietnam's Đỗ Hùng Dũng (right) battled for the ball.
- Other names: Southeast Asian Derby
- Location: Asia (AFC); Southeast Asia (AFF)
- Teams: Indonesia; Vietnam; Formerly; North Vietnam; South Vietnam
- First meeting: as South Vietnam; 5 September 1957; Indonesia 3–1 South Vietnam as Vietnam; 28 November 1991; Indonesia 1–0 Vietnam
- Latest meeting: 3 August 2026; ASEAN Championship; Indonesia 0–3 Vietnam

Statistics
- Total meetings: 51
- Most wins: Indonesia (21)
- Top scorer: Iswadi Idris (5)
- All-time series: Indonesia: 21; Draw: 13; Vietnam: 17
- Largest victory: as South Vietnam; Indonesia 9–1 South Vietnam (2 May 1971) as Vietnam; Vietnam 4–0 Indonesia (7 June 2021)

The rivalry between Indonesia and Vietnam men's national football teams is one the most enduring and competitive matchups of Asia in general and Southeast Asia in particular, with a history spanning over six decades. Their first encounter took place on 5 September 1957, during the Merdeka Tournament in Kuala Lumpur, Malaysia, where Indonesia secured a 3–1 victory over South Vietnam. Prior to the 1990s, Indonesia encountered South and North Vietnam on 16 occasions. Following the reunification of Vietnam, the newly unified team met Indonesia for the first time on 28 November 1991. Over the years, the two nations have clashed a total of 48 times, with Indonesia emerging victorious 21 times, Vietnam winning 15 times, and 12 matches ending in draws.

In 2024, Indonesia and Vietnam faced each other four times, with Indonesia emerging victorious in three encounters and Vietnam winning the last match. The series began with a group-stage match in the 2023 AFC Asian Cup on 19 January, where Indonesia secured a 1–0 win. This was followed by two consecutive meetings during the second round of the 2026 FIFA World Cup Asian qualifiers on 21 and 26 March. Both matches, ended with Indonesia claiming 1–0 and 3–0 victories, respectively. The two teams met again in the group stage of 2024 ASEAN Championship where Vietnam won 1-0.

== List of matches ==
=== Indonesia–North Vietnam ===
29 April 1963 1963 Piala Soekarno	Indonesia	3–1	North Vietnam	Jakarta, Indonesia
--:-- UTC+7	Goal	Report	Goal	Stadium: Gelora Senayan Main Stadium

8 August 1965 1965 GANEFO	North Vietnam	1–2	Indonesia	Pyongyang, North Korea
--:-- UTC+9	Goal	Report	Goal	Stadium: Moranbong Stadium

=== Indonesia–South Vietnam ===
5 September 1957 1957 Merdeka Tournament	Indonesia	3–1	South Vietnam	Kuala Lumpur, Malaya
--:-- UTC+8	Tee San Liong 10'; Suratmo 17'; Saari 50'		Don 78'	Stadium: Merdeka

2 September 1958 1958 Merdeka Tournament	Indonesia	4–1	South Vietnam	Kuala Lumpur, Malaya
--:-- UTC+8	Liong Houw 20' (pen.); Bakir Goordey 25'; Saari 38'; Soerjadi 52'		Han 70'	Stadium: Stadium Merdeka; Attendance: 10,000; Referee: T. Nadarajah (Malaya)

13 August 1960 1960 Merdeka Tournament	South Vietnam	3–5	Indonesia	Kuala Lumpur, Malaya
--:-- UTC+8	Don 31'; Ron 51'; Vinch 67'		Suratmo 6' (pen.), 53'; Tee San Liong 22'; Timisela 60', 76'	Stadium: Merdeka

17 August 1960 Friendly	Indonesia	1–1	South Vietnam	Kallang, Singapore
--:-- UTC+8	Timisela 55'		Ngo 58'	Stadium: Jalan Besar; Attendance: 5.109; Referee: Haron Angullia

21 October 1961 1961 Quoc Khanh Cup	South Vietnam	4–1	Indonesia	Saigon, South Vietnam
--:-- UTC+7	Goal		Goal

25 August 1962 1962 Asian Games GS	Indonesia	1–0	South Vietnam	Jakarta, Indonesia
--:-- UTC+7	Solong 62'			Stadium: Ikada; Attendance: 100.000; Referee: Ferguson (Singapore)

14 September 1962 1962 Merdeka Tournament	Indonesia	2–1	South Vietnam	Kuala Lumpur, Malaya
--:-- UTC+8	Maurits Manuhutu 43'; Hengki Timisela 50'	Report	Phan Duong Cam 46' (pen.)	Stadium: Merdeka

25 October 1962 1962 Quoc Khanh Cup	South Vietnam	4–0	Indonesia	Saigon, South Vietnam
--:-- UTC+7	Goal

31 October 1962 1962 Quoc Khanh Cup Final	South Vietnam	2–0	Indonesia	Saigon, South Vietnam
--:-- UTC+7	Goal

11 December 1966 1966 Asian Games GS	Indonesia	0–0	South Vietnam	Bangkok, Thailand
--:-- UTC+7

21 November 1969 1969 King's Cup	Indonesia	3–1	South Vietnam	Bangkok, Thailand
--:-- UTC+7	Mulyadi 22' (pen.); Timisela 24'; Sihasale 80'		Quang Kim Phung 35'

31 October 1970 1970 Quoc Khanh Cup	South Vietnam	3–1	Indonesia	Saigon, South Vietnam
--:-- UTC+7	Goal		Goal

9 November 1970 1970 King's Cup	Indonesia	5–3	South Vietnam	Bangkok, Thailand
--:-- UTC+8	Waskito 5', 12', 70'; Abdul Kadir 59', 63'		Cu Sinh 42'; Tran Tiet Van 88'	Stadium: Supachalasai Stadium

2 May 1971 1971 President's Cup	Indonesia	9–1	South Vietnam	Seoul, South Korea
16:30 UTC+9	Iswadi Idris		Goal	Stadium: Dongdaemun Stadium

16 November 1971 1971 King's Cup	Indonesia	2–3	South Vietnam	Bangkok, South Korea
16:30 UTC+9	Goal		Goal

17 March 1975 1976 AFC Asian Cup qualification	Indonesia	2–1	South Vietnam	Bangkok, Thailand
--:-- UTC+7	Wibisono 9', 13'		Goal

=== Indonesia–Vietnam ===
28 November 1991 1991 Sea Games GS	Indonesia	1–0	Vietnam	Manila, Philippines
--:-- UTC+8	Darwis 35'			Stadium: Rizal Memorial Stadium

16 April 1993 1994 FIFA World Cup qualification	Vietnam	1–0	Indonesia	Doha, Qatar
--:-- UTC+3	Hà Vương Ngầu Nại 61'

30 April 1993 1994 FIFA World Cup qualification	Indonesia	2–1	Vietnam	Singapore
--:-- UTC+8	Putut Widjanarko 55'; Sudirman 75'		Nguyễn Hồng Sơn 30'

9 June 1993 1993 Sea Games GS	Indonesia	1–0	Vietnam	Singapore
--:-- UTC+8	Taufik Yunus 51'

12 December 1995 1995 Sea Games GS	Vietnam	1–0	Indonesia	Chiang Mai, Thailand
--:-- UTC+7	Nguyễn Hữu Đang			Stadium: 700th Anniversary Stadium

11 September 1996 1996 AFF Cup GS	Indonesia	1–1	Vietnam	Jurong, Singapore
--:-- UTC+8	Kurniawan 43'		Võ Hoàng Bửu 77' (pen.)	Stadium: Jurong Stadium; Attendance: 1,300

15 September 1996 1996 AFF Cup Third place	Indonesia	2–3	Vietnam	Kallang, Singapore
--:-- UTC+8	Kurniawan 66'; Tecuari 85'		Huỳnh Quốc Cường 8'; Yeyen 27' (o.g.); Võ Hoàng Bửu 73' (pen.)	Stadium: National Stadium; Attendance: 32,000

24 February 1997 1997 Dunhill Cup	Indonesia	1–0	Vietnam	Kuala Lumpur, Malaysia
--:-- UTC+8	Widodo 3'	Report		Stadium: Stadium Merdeka

7 October 1997 1997 Sea Games GS	Indonesia	2–2	Vietnam	Jakarta, Indonesia
--:-- UTC+7	Bima; Kurniawan		Van Sy Hung	Stadium: Gelora Senayan Stadium

12 August 1999 1999 Sea Games SF	Indonesia	0–1	Vietnam	Bandar Seri Begawan, Brunei
--:-- UTC+8			Nguyen Hong Son 70'	Stadium: Hassanal Bolkiah Stadium; Attendance: 3,000; Referee: Sun Bao Jie (China)

16 November 2000 2000 AFF Cup Semi-finals	Vietnam	2–3 (a.e.t.)	Indonesia	Bangkok, Thailand
16:00 UTC+7	Nguyễn Hồng Sơn 45'; Vũ Công Tuyền 90'		Gendut 39' 120'; Nurdiantoro 75'	Stadium: Rajamangala Stadium; Referee: S. Kumbalingam Kennedy (Singapore)

2 August 2002 2002 LG Cup	Vietnam	3–1	Indonesia	Ho Chi Minh City, Vietnam
--:-- UTC+7	Huỳnh Hồng Sơn 15', 75'; Lê Huỳnh Đức 58'	Report	Kurniawan 20'	Stadium: Thống Nhất Stadium

21 December 2002 2002 AFF Cup Group A	Indonesia	2–2	Vietnam	Jakarta, Indonesia
18:35 UTC+7	Budi 12'; Zaenal 83'		Phan Văn Tài Em 53'; Lê Huỳnh Đức 59'	Stadium: Gelora Bung Karno Stadium; Attendance: 30,000; Referee: Subkhiddin Mohd Salleh (Malaysia)

11 December 2004 2004 AFF Cup Group A	Vietnam	0–3	Indonesia	Hanoi, Vietnam
19:30 UTC+7			Muhammad 18'; Boaz 21'; Ilham 45'	Stadium: Mỹ Đình National Stadium; Referee: Abdulhameed Ebrahim (Bahrain)

15 January 2007 2007 AFF Cup Group B	Indonesia	1–1	Vietnam	Kallang, Singapore
17:30 UTC+8	Saktiawan 90'	Report	Supardi 35' (o.g.)	Stadium: National Stadium; Attendance: 4,500; Referee: Mohamed Shahbuddin (Brunei)

11 June 2008 Friendly	Indonesia	1–0	Vietnam	Surabaya, Indonesia
--:-- UTC+7	Bambang 12' (pen.)	Report		Stadium: Gelora 10 November Stadium

15 September 2012 Friendly	Indonesia	0–0	Vietnam	Surabaya, Indonesia
15:30 UTC+7		Report		Stadium: Gelora Bung Tomo Stadium; Attendance: 8,000

16 October 2012 Friendly	Vietnam	0–0	Indonesia	Hanoi, Vietnam
15:30 UTC+7		Report		Stadium: Mỹ Đình National Stadium

22 November 2014 2014 AFF Cup Group A	Vietnam	2–2	Indonesia	Hanoi, Vietnam
19:00 UTC+7	Quế Ngọc Hải 11'; Lê Công Vinh 68'	Report	Zulham 33'; Samsul 84'	Stadium: Mỹ Đình National Stadium; Referee: Minoru Tōjō (Japan)

9 October 2016 Friendly	Indonesia	2–2	Vietnam	Sleman, Indonesia
16:45 UTC+7	Zulham 26'; Bachdim 28'	Report	Lê Văn Thắng 4'; Vũ Minh Tuấn 12'	Stadium: Maguwoharjo Stadium; Attendance: 22,167; Referee: Win Khin Maung (Myanmar)

8 November 2016 Friendly	Vietnam	3–2	Indonesia	Hanoi, Vietnam
19:00 UTC+7	Công Vinh 45'; Công Phượng 71'; Văn Toàn 83'	Report	Boaz 32'; Bachdim 52' (pen.)	Stadium: Mỹ Đình National Stadium; Referee: Feemuechang Alongkron (Thailand)

3 December 2016 2016 AFF Cup Semi-finals 1st Leg	Indonesia	2–1	Vietnam	Bogor, Indonesia
19:00 UTC+7	Hansamu 7'; Boaz 50' (pen.)	Report	Quyết 17' (pen.)	Stadium: Pakansari; Attendance: 30,000; Referee: Jarred Gillett (Australia)

7 December 2016 2016 AFF Cup Semi-finals 2nd Leg	Vietnam	2–2 (a.e.t.)	Indonesia	Hanoi, Vietnam
19:00 UTC+7	Vũ Văn Thanh 83'; Vũ Minh Tuấn 90+3'	Report	Lilipaly 54'; Lestusen 97' (pen.)	Stadium: Mỹ Đình National Stadium; Attendance: 40,000; Referee: Fu Ming (China)

15 October 2019 2022 FIFA World Cup qualification	Indonesia	1–3	Vietnam	Gianyar, Indonesia
19:30 UTC+8	Irfan 84'	Report (FIFA); Report (AFC)	Yanto 26' (o.g.); Quế Ngọc Hải 55' (pen.); Nguyễn Tiến Linh 61'	Stadium: Kapten I Wayan Dipta Stadium (Note: The Indonesia v Vietnam match was shifted to Kapten I Wayan Dipta Stadium, Gianyar from Gelora Bung Karno Stadium, Jakarta based on an internal risk management process and analysis by the PSSI General Secretariat.); Attendance: 8,237; Referee: Turki Al-Khudhayr (Saudi Arabia)

7 June 2021 2022 World Cup qualification R2	Vietnam	4–0	Indonesia	Dubai, United Arab Emirates
20:45 UTC+4	Nguyễn Tiến Linh 51'; Nguyễn Quang Hải 62'; Nguyễn Công Phượng 67'; Vũ Văn Thanh 74'	Report (FIFA); Report (AFC)		Stadium: Al Maktoum Stadium; Attendance: 225; Referee: Ahmed Al-Ali (Jordan)

15 December 2021 2020 AFF Championship	Indonesia	0–0	Vietnam	Bishan, Singapore
20:30 UTC+8		Report (AFFSZ); Report (AFF)		Stadium: Bishan Stadium; Attendance: 928; Referee: Kim Dae-yong (South Korea)

6 January 2023 2022 AFF Championship SF	Indonesia	0–0	Vietnam	Jakarta, Indonesia
16:30 UTC+7		Report (AFFMEC); Report (AFF)		Stadium: Gelora Bung Karno Stadium; Attendance: 49,595; Referee: Omar Al-Yaqoubi (Oman)

9 January 2023 2022 AFF Championship SF	Vietnam	2–0	Indonesia	Hanoi, Vietnam
19:30 UTC+7	Nguyễn Tiến Linh 3', 47'	Report (AFFMEC); Report (AFF)		Stadium: Mỹ Đình National Stadium; Attendance: 37,675; Referee: Yusuke Araki (Japan)

19 January 2024 2023 AFC Asian Cup GS	Vietnam	0–1	Indonesia	Doha, Qatar
17:30 UTC+3		Report	Asnawi 42' (pen.)	Stadium: Abdullah bin Khalifa Stadium; Attendance: 7,253; Referee: Sadullo Gulmurodi (Tajikistan)

21 March 2024 2026 World Cup qualification R2	Indonesia	1–0	Vietnam	Jakarta, Indonesia
20:30 UTC+7	Egy 52'	Report		Stadium: Gelora Bung Karno Stadium; Attendance: 57,696; Referee: Salman Falahi (Qatar)

26 March 2024 2026 World Cup qualification R2	Vietnam	0–3	Indonesia	Hanoi, Vietnam
19:00 UTC+7		Report	Idzes 9'; Oratmangoen 23'; Sananta 90+8'	Stadium: Mỹ Đình National Stadium; Attendance: 27,832; Referee: Alireza Faghani (Australia)

15 December 2024 2024 ASEAN Championship	Vietnam	1–0	Indonesia	Việt Trì, Vietnam
20:00 UTC+7	Nguyễn Quang Hải 77'	Report		Stadium: Việt Trì Stadium; Attendance: 27,832; Referee: Abdullah Dhafer Al-Shehri (Saudi Arabia)

3 August 2026 2026 ASEAN Championship	Indonesia	0–3	Vietnam	Bogor, Indonesia
20:30 UTC+7		Report	Nguyễn Văn Vĩ 6'; Nguyễn Hai Long 14'; Rafaelson 71'	Stadium: Pakansari; Attendance: 27,265; Referee: Tim Danaskos (Australia)

== Statistics ==
As of 3 August 2026

More wins More losses

Team	First	Last	GP	W	D	L	GF	GA	GD	% Win
Indonesia (Note: Includes matches against North Vietnam and South Vietnam.)	1957	2026	51	21	13	17	75	67	+8	41.18%
Vietnam (Note: Includes matches as North Vietnam and South Vietnam.)	1957	2026	51	17	13	21	67	75	−8	32.69%

== See also ==
- Indonesia–Vietnam relations
- Australia–Indonesia football rivalry
- Indonesia–Malaysia football rivalry
- Indonesia–Singapore football rivalry
