= Timisela =

Timisela is a Moluccan surname. Notable people with the surname include:

- Henky Timisela (1937 - 2025), Indonesian footballer
- Janny Timisela (born 1962), Dutch football manager and former player
- Max Timisela (born 1944), Indonesian footballer
- Michael Timisela (born 1986), Dutch footballer
