= Indonesia national football team results =

Indonesia national football team results may refer to:

- Dutch East Indies national football team results (1934–49)
- Indonesia national football team results (1950–1979)
- Indonesia national football team results (1980–1999)
- Indonesia national football team results (2000–2009)
- Indonesia national football team results (2010–2019)
- Indonesia national football team results (2020–present)
