= Soetjipto Soentoro =

Indonesian footballer

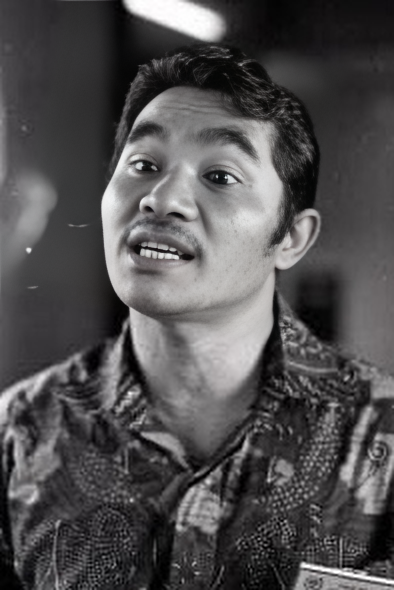
- Soentoro in 1985

Personal information
- Date of birth: 16 June 1941
- Place of birth: Bandung, Indonesia
- Date of death: 12 November 1994 (aged 53)
- Place of death: Jakarta, Indonesia
- Height: 1.69 m (5 ft 7 in)
- Position: Second striker

Youth career
- 1954–1955: IPPI Kebayoran
- 1955–1961: Setia Jakarta

Senior career*
Years	Team	Apps	(Gls)
1961–1968	Persija Jakarta	35	(37)
1969–1970	PSMS Medan	11	(6)
1971	Persija Jakarta	3	(2)

International career
1959–1961	Indonesia U19	9	(14)
1965–1970	Indonesia	61	(37)

Managerial career
- Buana Putra Galatama
- Persiba Balikpapan
- Persiraja Banda Aceh
- 1978–1979: Indonesia U19
Medal record
Men's football
Representing Indonesia
AFC U-20 Asian Cup
Winner	1961 Thailand	Team
- * Club domestic league appearances and goals

Soetjipto Soentoro (16 June 1941 – 12 November 1994), commonly known as "Gareng", was an Indonesian footballer who captained Indonesia's national team.

== Early life ==
Born in Bandung, Jawa Barat, he was raised in a family of football enthusiasts. His brothers, Soegijo and Soegito, were played for Persija Jakarta between 1952 and 1964. Soetjipto played football as a teenager in the streets in the area of Kebayoran Baru, Jakarta in 1954. He came to the attention of Djamiat Dalhar when playing for Setia Jakarta (a Persija youth team) who subsequently called Soetjipto up to the national junior team.

At 16 years old, Soentoro joined Persija where he was given his nickname "Gareng", after a diminutive character in Indonesia's Wayang, due his short stature.

== Club career ==
In his debut, Soentoro scored four goals in a 7–0 win against PSP Padang. He followed up that performance with a goal against PSB Bogor and an equaliser against PSM Makassar. With four more goals against PSMS and a hat trick against Persib, Soentoro helped Persija reach the final which they won against Persebaya to become the 1964 Perserikatan champions. After an unbeaten season, Soentoro was confirmed as the top scorer having scored 16 goals in his debut season.

During the newly formatted 1964–65 Perserikatan, Persija failed to defend their title, losing in the semi-final despite Soentoro scoring in their first leg victory over Persebaya. They would go on to lose the second leg 4–2 and be eliminated as a result.

In the 1965–66 Perserikatan, Persija finished forth in the West Zone with Soetjipto scoring three times in his five appearances.

Persija fared better in the 1966–67 Perserikatan, finishing third in the Western Group with Soetjipto scoring five goals in his five appearances.

In the 1969–71 Perserikatan, Soetjipto scored two goals in his three appearances.

== National team career ==
=== Junior team ===
In the 1960 AFC Youth Championship, Soetjipto Soentoro scored five goals to lead Indonesia to a third place finish, scoring his first against Singapore in the first minute. His performance at the tournament led him to receive his first senior call-up.

=== Senior team ===
In 1965, Indonesia travelled to Europe to play two powerhouses of European football, Feyenoord, of the Netherlands and SV Werder Bremen, of Germany.

Despite Sukarno's words of motivation prior to their game against the Eredivisie champions Feyenoord, featuring Guus Hiddink, Indonesia lost 6–1 with Soentoro scoring in the second minute. He would follow this performance with a hat trick against Bundesliga champions Werder Bremen Bremen manager, Günter Brocker, offered Soentoro a chance to play for Werder Bremen but this was not sanctioned by Sukarno, especially as the squad was preparing for the 1966 Asian Games.

Soetjipto made his debut in international competitions at the 1966 Asian Games in Tokyo, scoring two goals as Indonesia reached the quarter-finals and followed that up at the 1966 Aga Khan Gold Cup with nine goals in four games including a goal in the final against Mohammedan SC, which Indonesia won 2–1.

Soetjipto scored nine goals at the 1968 Merdeka Tournament and helped Indonesia win the 1968 King's Cup with seven goals in five games followed by victory in the 1969 Merdeka Tournament with another eleven goals from Soetjipto.

At the 1970 Asian Games, Soetjipto only managed one goal in their match against Iran. Following the tournament he announced his retirement.

== Managerial career ==
Initially Soetjipto joined Bank Negara Indonesia before choosing to study coaching in West Germany in 1978 and eventually coaching Buana Putra, Persiba Balikpapan and Persiraja Banda Aceh.

Soetjipto also managed the Indonesia under-19 during the 1978 AFC Youth Championship and 1979 FIFA World Youth Championship. However his Indonesian side were unable to progress beyond the group stage after losing each of their games by five or more goals.

== Death ==
In 1990, Soetjipto suffered from liver cancer, after four years fighting against the illness, he died on 12 November 1994. He was 53 years old. He left two children, Bisma and Tantri.

== Career statistics ==
=== Club ===
Club	Season	League	
Club	Season	Apps	Goals
Persija	1964	8	16
Persija	1965	14	11
Persija	1966	5	3
Persija	1967	5	5
Persija	1971	3	2
Total		35	37

=== International ===
National Team	Season		
National Team	Season	Apps	Goals
Indonesia	1965	6	2
Indonesia	1966	5	2
Indonesia	1967	9	7
Indonesia	1968	15	14
Indonesia	1969	8	6
Indonesia	1970	18	6
Total Career		61	37

Scores and results list Indonesia's goal tally first, score column indicates score after each Soentoro goal.

List of international goals scored by Soetjipto Soentoro
No.	Date	Venue	Opponent	Score	Result	Competition
1	29 April 1965	Gelora Bung Karno Stadium, Jakarta, Indonesia	Sri Lanka	3–0	5–0	Friendly
2	29 April 1965	Gelora Bung Karno Stadium, Jakarta, Indonesia	Sri Lanka	4–0	5–0	Friendly
3	14 December 1966	Bangkok, Thailand	Taiwan	1–0	3–1	1966 Asian Games
4	15 December 1966	Bangkok, Thailand	Burma	1–0	2–2	1966 Asian Games
5	27 July 1967	Taipei Municipal Stadium, Taipei, Republic of China	South Korea	1–1	1–1	1968 AFC Asian Cup qualification
6	3 August 1967	Taipei Municipal Stadium, Taipei, Republic of China	Taiwan	1–1	2–3	1968 AFC Asian Cup qualification
7	3 August 1967	Taipei Municipal Stadium, Taipei, Republic of China	Taiwan	2–3	2–3	1968 AFC Asian Cup qualification
8	5 August 1967	Taipei Municipal Stadium, Taipei, Republic of China	Japan	1–0	1–2	1968 AFC Asian Cup qualification
9	7 August 1967	Taipei Municipal Stadium, Taipei, Republic of China	Philippines	2–0	6–0	1968 AFC Asian Cup qualification
10	7 August 1967	Taipei Municipal Stadium, Taipei, Republic of China	Philippines	3–0	6–0	1968 AFC Asian Cup qualification
11	22 January 1968	Ipoh, Malaysia	Singapore	3–1	4–1	1967 Merdeka Tournament
12	22 January 1968	Supachalasai Stadium, Bangkok, Thailand	Iraq	1–0	1–1	1968 Summer Olympics qualification
13	15 August 1968	Merdeka Stadium, Kuala Lumpur, Malaysia	Singapore	1–0	4–0	1968 Merdeka Tournament
14	15 August 1968	Merdeka Stadium, Kuala Lumpur, Malaysia	Singapore	4–0	4–0	1968 Merdeka Tournament
15	18 August 1968	Merdeka Stadium, Kuala Lumpur, Malaysia	Taiwan	1–0	10–1	1968 Merdeka Tournament
16	18 August 1968	Merdeka Stadium, Kuala Lumpur, Malaysia	Taiwan	3–0	10–1	1968 Merdeka Tournament
17	18 August 1968	Merdeka Stadium, Kuala Lumpur, Malaysia	Taiwan	8–1	10–1	1968 Merdeka Tournament
18	24 November 1968	Bangkok, Thailand	Burma	1–1	3–1	1968 King's Cup
19	26 November 1968	Bangkok, Thailand	Singapore	2–0	7–0	1968 King's Cup
20	26 November 1968	Bangkok, Thailand	Singapore	3–0	7–0	1968 King's Cup
21	26 November 1968	Bangkok, Thailand	Singapore	4–0	7–0	1968 King's Cup
22	28 November 1968	Bangkok, Thailand	Malaysia	2–0	6–1	1968 King's Cup
23	28 November 1968	Bangkok, Thailand	Malaysia	4–1	6–1	1968 King's Cup
24	28 November 1968	Bangkok, Thailand	Malaysia	5–1	6–1	1968 King's Cup
25	2 December 1968	Bangkok, Thailand	Burma	1–0	1–0	1968 King's Cup
26	7 November 1969	Merdeka Stadium, Kuala Lumpur, Malaysia	Singapore	4–0	9–2	1969 Merdeka Tournament
27	7 November 1969	Merdeka Stadium, Kuala Lumpur, Malaysia	Singapore	8–2	9–2	1969 Merdeka Tournament
28	7 November 1969	Merdeka Stadium, Kuala Lumpur, Malaysia	Singapore	9–2	9–2	1969 Merdeka Tournament
29	9 November 1969	Merdeka Stadium, Kuala Lumpur, Malaysia	Malaysia	2–2	3–2	1969 Merdeka Tournament
30	26 November 1969	Bangkok, Thailand	Laos	2–0	3–1	1969 King's Cup
31	26 November 1969	Bangkok, Thailand	Laos	3–0	3–1	1969 King's Cup
32	1 August 1970	Kuala Lumpur, Malaysia	Singapore	1–0	3–1	1970 Merdeka Tournament
33	1 August 1970	Kuala Lumpur, Malaysia	Singapore	2–0	3–1	1970 Merdeka Tournament
34	10 August 1970	Kuala Lumpur, Malaysia	Thailand	1–0	6–3	1970 Merdeka Tournament
35	10 August 1970	Kuala Lumpur, Malaysia	Thailand	2–1	6–3	1970 Merdeka Tournament
36	13 November 1970	Bangkok, Thailand	Cambodia	1–0	2–4	1970 King's Cup
37	10 December 1970	Bangkok, Thailand	Iran	1–1	2–2	1970 Asian Games

== Honours ==
Persija Jakarta

- Perserikatan (1): 1964

PSMS Medan

- Perserikatan (1): 1969

Indonesia U19

- AFC Youth Championship (1): 1961

Indonesia

- Aga Khan Gold Cup (1): 1966
- Merdeka Tournament (1): 1969
- King's Cup (1): 1968

Individual

- Merdeka Tournament Top Scorer: 1969
- King's Cup Top Scorer: 1968
- Galatama Top Scorer: 1964
- AFC Asian All Stars: 1967, 1968
- IFFHS Men's All Time Indonesia Dream Team: 2022

Preceded by Maulwi Saelan	Indonesian Captain; 1965–1970	Succeeded by Iswadi Idris
