= Endang Witarsa =

Indonesian footballer (1916–2008)

Personal information
- Birth name: Liem Sun-Yu
- Date of birth: 16 October 1916
- Place of birth: Kebumen, Dutch East Indies
- Date of death: 2 April 2008 (aged 91)
- Place of death: Jakarta, Indonesia
- Position: Goalkeeper

Senior career*
Years	Team	Apps	(Gls)
- UMS 1905
- Persija Jakarta

International career
1956–1957	Indonesia		

Managerial career
- 1951–1957: UMS 1905
- 1962–1967: Persija Jakarta
- 1967–1976: Indonesia
- 1979–1996: Warna Agung
- * Club domestic league appearances and goals

Endang Witarsa (born Liem Sun-Yu (Chinese: 林順有; pinyin: Lín Shùnyǒu); 16 October 1916 – 2 April 2008) was an Indonesian former football player and coach.

== Career ==
Witarsa trained as a dentist, but discovered that his passion lay with football. During his youth, Witarsa joined UMS (Union Makes Strength), a Chinese Indonesian football club, in 1948 as a halfback.

In his later years, Witarsa became a goalkeeper, playing as such for the Indonesian national team in the football tournament of the 1956 Summer Olympics, becoming, at the age of 40, the oldest-ever player in the history of the Olympics. Witarsa is sometimes confused with fellow Indonesian footballer Aang Witarsa, who scored three goals for Indonesia in 1957, which led to some news outlets to wrongly claim that Endang was one of the oldest ever international goalscorers, aged 40 years, 7 months, and 21 days.

After retiring in 1957, Witarsa became a coach, taking over the likes of UMS 1905 and Persija Jakarta in the 1950s and 1960s, before taking charge of the Indonesian national team in 1967, a position that he held for nine years, until 1979.

== Later life ==
Witarsa received a Lifetime Achievement Award from Badan Liga Indonesia in October 2006 because of his dedication for nearly 70 years as a player and coach. Witarsa died on 2 April 2008, at Pluit Hospital, Jakarta.
