= Andi Ramang =

Indonesian footballer (1924–1987)

Personal information
- Full name: Andi Ramang
- Date of birth: 24 April 1924
- Place of birth: Barru, South Sulawesi, Dutch East Indies
- Date of death: 26 September 1987 (aged 63)
- Place of death: Ujung Pandang, South Sulawesi, Indonesia
- Position: Forward

Youth career
- 1939–1943: Barru

Senior career*
Years	Team	Apps	(Gls)
1947–1960	PSM Makassar		
1962–1969	PSM Makassar		

International career
1952–1962	Indonesia	18	(11)

Managerial career
- PSM Makassar
- PSBI Blitar
- Persipal Palu
- PSM Makassar
Medal record
Men's football
Representing Indonesia
Asian Games
Bronze medal – third place	1958 Tokyo
- * Club domestic league appearances and goals

Andi Ramang (24 April 1924 – 26 September 1987) was an Indonesian footballer who played as a forward, who was considered one of the most influential players in the country in the 1950s and 1960s. He was also referred to as Rusli Ramang in official FIFA documents.

== Early life ==
Ramang was born in 1924 in Barru, South Sulawesi. His father, Nyo'lo, was an aide to the King of Gowa, Djondjong Karenta Lemamparang, and was known for his ability in sepak takraw. Ramang spent his childhood playing sepak takraw using balls made out of rattan, cloth and even oranges. This is believed to be the reason why he frequently score goals using bicycle kicks.

== Club career and other jobs ==
Ramang started his career as a football player in 1939 by joining a football club in Barru. He played until 1943, when he decided to end his bachelorhood. Together with his wife, they opened a small coffee shop for a living. After the death of their newborn baby, they decided to leave for Ujungpandang (now Makassar) just before Indonesia's independence. They stayed at a friend's house, and Ramang started his life there as a becak driver, later becoming a truck driver assistant. During this time, his wife gave birth to their second child.

In 1947, Ramang was contracted by PSM Makassar, after seeing his performance in a competition held by PSM. His team, Persis (Persatuan Sepakbola Seluruh Sulawesi), won 9–0 in one of the matches, with only two names on the scoreboard, one of them being Ramang, scoring 7 goals. He only spent a year at PSM, later working in the Public Works Department, with a salary of 3,500 rupiahs (equal to 4 US cents).

== International career ==
In 1952, Ramang replaced Sunardi, Suardi Arland's brother – both of them football players – to join a training camp in Djakarta. This led to his call-up to the Indonesia national football team. During the All-Indonesia tour of the Far East in 1953, Indonesia played against the Philippines in their country, All-Hong Kong, Hong Kong Selection, Combined Chinese and South Korea in Hong Kong, and the Thai Royal Air Force in Bangkok, Thailand. Indonesia only lost once to South Korea and winning all the other games. They only conceded 7 goals and scored 25 goals, of which 19 of them are scored by Ramang.

Ramang was also called up by coach Antun Pogačnik to be the part of the 1956 Summer Olympics team in Melbourne. Indonesia automatically qualified to the quarterfinals after South Vietnam withdrew. They successfully held the Soviet Union 0–0, who at the time was considered to be one of the strongest teams in the world. In the replay match Indonesia lost 0–4 to USSR, but the first game was considered as one of the famous matches in the Indonesian football history.

Ramang, who wore shirt number 9 in the tournament stated in an interview with Tempo about the match: "Actually I was about to score a goal that time. But my shirt was being pulled from behind." It was the first time, also the only one so far for the Indonesian football team to participate in the Summer Olympics.

One of Ramang's famous goals was against China PR in the 1958 FIFA World Cup qualification, where Indonesia won 2–0, and one of the goals was done by a bicycle kick.

Ramang gained nationwide popularity during his international career, including in the late 50s, when many Indonesian mothers named their babies "Ramang".

== Later life and death ==
Ramang was suspended from football in 1960 after he was accused of accepting bribes, which he denied until his death. In 1962 he was called up again by PSM Makassar, but finally decided to retire from football in 1968, at the age of 44. He then decided to become a coach for PSM Makassar, then other football clubs, PSBI Blitar and Persipal Palu, and later returned to coach PSM Makassar.

One night in 1981, Ramang returned home with wet clothes after coaching PSM Makassar players under the rain. He then became sick and was diagnosed with pneumonia. Ramang stayed at home for six years because he had no money to pay for hospital care. Ramang died in Ujungpandang, on 26 September 1987, at the age of 63, and was survived by his 4 children and 10 grandchildren.

== Legacy ==
Minister of Youths and Sport Andi Mallarangeng said that Ramang was "an inspiration to Makassarese children who love football". Ramang's life story also was made to biographical book written by M. Dahlan Abu Bakar entitled Ramang, Macan Bola, released in August 2011. Harry Tjong, Ramang's partner in national team said that Ramang is worth called "the special one" such as Mourinho, and also he was like Maradona.

== Career statistics ==
=== International ===
Appearances and goals by national team and year
National team	Year	Apps	Goals
Indonesia	1953	1	2
Indonesia	1954	4	4
Indonesia	1956	5	1
Indonesia	1957	3	4
Indonesia	1958	5	0
Total		18	11

Scores and results list Indonesia's goal tally first, score column indicates score after each Ramang goal.

List of international goals scored by Andi Ramang
No.	Date	Venue	Cap	Opponent	Score	Result	Competition
1	25 April 1953	Government Stadium, So Kon Po, British Hong Kong	1	Hong Kong	–	4–1	Friendly
2	25 April 1953	Government Stadium, So Kon Po, British Hong Kong	1	Hong Kong	–	4–1	Friendly
3	1 May 1954	Rizal Memorial Stadium, Manila, Philippines	2	Japan	1–0	5–3	1954 Asian Games
4	5 May 1954	Rizal Memorial Stadium, Manila, Philippines	3	India	2–0	4–0	1954 Asian Games
5	5 May 1954	Rizal Memorial Stadium, Manila, Philippines	3	India	3–0	4–0	1954 Asian Games
6	8 May 1954	Rizal Memorial Stadium, Manila, Philippines	5	Burma	4–5	4–5	1954 Asian Games
7	16 November 1956	Ikada Stadium, Djakarta, Indonesia	7	United States	–	7–5	Friendly
8	12 May 1957	Ikada Stadium, Djakarta, Indonesia	11	China	1–0	2–0	1958 FIFA World Cup qualification
9	12 May 1957	Ikada Stadium, Djakarta, Indonesia	11	China	2–0	2–0	1958 FIFA World Cup qualification
10	2 June 1957	Xiannongtan Stadium, Beijing, China	12	China	1–2	3–4	1958 FIFA World Cup qualification
11	2 June 1957	Xiannongtan Stadium, Beijing, China	12	China	2–3	3–4	1958 FIFA World Cup qualification

== Honours ==
PSM Makassar

- Perserikatan: 1955–57, 1957–59, 1964–65, 1965–66

Indonesia

- Asian Games (bronze) Bronze medal: 1958

Individual

- IFFHS Men's All Time Indonesia Dream Team: 2022
