= Tan Ling Houw =

Indonesian footballer (1930–2026)

Tan Liong Houw
Personal information
- Date of birth: 26 July 1930
- Place of birth: Soerabaja, Soerabaja Residency, Dutch East Indies
- Date of death: 29 June 2026 (aged 95)
- Place of death: Jakarta, Indonesia
- Position: Midfielder

Youth career
- PS Tunas Jaya

Senior career*
Years	Team	Apps	(Gls)
1951–1963	Persija Jakarta	44	(8)
- UMS 1905

International career
1951–1962	Indonesia	38	(6)
Medal record
Men's football
Representing Indonesia
Asian Games
Bronze medal – third place	1958 Tokyo
- * Club domestic league appearances and goals

Tan Liong Houw (26 July 1930 – 29 June 2026) or Latief Harris Tanoto was an Indonesian footballer. He competed in the men's tournament at the 1956 Summer Olympics.

During his prime, Tan was an icon to the Indonesia national team and Persija Jakarta. Some Persija supporters gave him the nickname Macan Betawi (Betawi Tiger) despite being Chinese.

Tan died on 29 June 2026, at the age of 95.

== Career statistics ==
Scores and results list Indonesia's goal tally first, score column indicates score after each Tan goal.

List of international goals scored by Tan Ling Houw
No.	Date	Venue	Opponent	Score	Result	Competition
1	12 September 1956	Stadion Maksimir, Zagreb, SFR Yugoslavia	PR Croatia	1–3	2–5	Friendly
2	23 December 1956	Ikada Stadium, Djakarta, Indonesia	Yugoslavia	1–3	1–5	Friendly
3	25 May 1958	Tokyo, Japan	Burma	3–0	4–2	1958 Asian Games
4	2 July 1958	Jalan Besar Stadium, Kallang, Singapore	Singapore	4–0	5–0	Friendly
5	2 September 1958	Stadium Merdeka, Kuala Lumpur, Malaya	South Vietnam	1–0	4–1	1958 Merdeka Tournament
6	23 October 1961	Saigon, South Vietnam	Malaya	1–3	1–3	1961 Quoc Khanh Cup

*This is an incomplete list

== Honours ==
Persija Jakarta

- Perserikatan: 1953–54

Indonesia

- Merdeka Tournament: 1961
- Asian Games bronze medal: 1958
