= Anjas Asmara =

Indonesian footballer (born 1952)

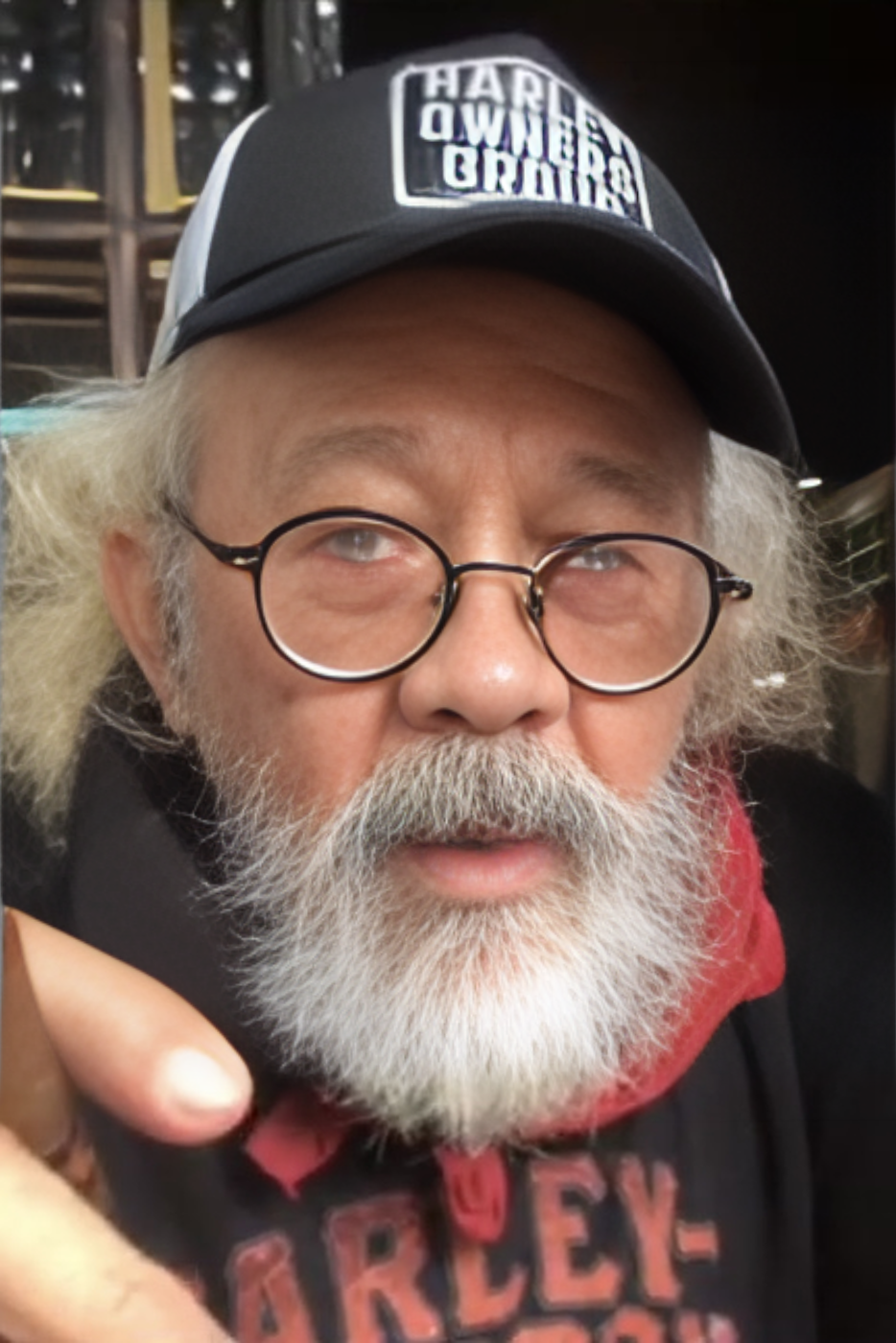
- Anjas in 2024

Personal information
- Date of birth: 30 April 1952 (age 74)
- Place of birth: Medan, Indonesia
- Position: Forward

Youth career
- –1970: Persija Jakarta

Senior career*
Years	Team	Apps	(Gls)
1970–1980	Persija Jakarta	30	(20)
1970–1972	→ PS Jayakarta (loan)		

International career
1972	Indonesia Yunior	4	(2)
1973–1977	Indonesia	30	(5)
- * Club domestic league appearances and goals

Anjas Asmara (born 30 April 1952), is an Indonesian former footballer who played as a forward. He was one of the Indonesia national team players who almost led Indonesia to the 1976 Summer Olympics. Alongside Suaib Rizal, his penalty kick failure against North Korea, guarded by Jin-In Chol in the qualification final at Gelora Senayan Stadium, Jakarta, denied Indonesia from qualifying to the Olympics. His current activity is coaching My Team, which is a collection of young non-amateur players recruited and selected from 6 cities in Indonesia.

== Career statistics ==
Scores and results list Indonesia's goal tally first, score column indicates score after each Anjas goal.

List of international goals scored by Andjas Asmara
No.	Date	Venue	Opponent	Score	Result	Competition
1	21 March 1973	Sydney Sports Ground, Sydney, Australia	Iraq	2–2	2–3	1974 FIFA World Cup qualification
2	26 September 1973	Dongdaemun Stadium, Seoul, South Korea	Khmer Republic	1–0	2–3	1973 President's Cup
3	19 April 1974	Gelora Senayan Stadium, Jakarta, Indonesia	Uruguay	2–0	2–1	Friendly
4	9 March 1977	National Stadium, Kallang, Singapura	Singapore	2–0	4–0	1978 FIFA World Cup qualification
5	15 June 1978	Gelora Senayan Stadium, Jakarta, Indonesia	Thailand	1–0	1–0	1978 Jakarta Anniversary Tournament

== Honours ==
Persija

- Perserikatan: 1971–73, 1973–75, 1978–79; runner-up 1975–78

Indonesia

- Jakarta Anniversary Tournament runner-up: 1973, 1974, 1978
