= Surya Lesmana =

Indonesian footballer and manager (1944–2012)

Surya Lesmana 林隋亮
Personal information
- Full name: Liem Soei Liang
- Date of birth: 20 May 1944
- Place of birth: Balaraja, Tangerang, Indonesia
- Date of death: 8 August 2012 (aged 68)
- Place of death: Glodok, West Jakarta, Indonesia
- Position: Midfielder

Youth career
- 1958–1960: UMS 1905

Senior career*
Years	Team	Apps	(Gls)
1960–1962	UMS 1905		
1962–1974	Persija Jakarta		
1974–1975	Mackinnons		

International career
1963–1973	Indonesia		

Managerial career
- 1975–2012: UMS 1905
- * Club domestic league appearances and goals

Liem Soei Liang (Chinese: 林隋亮), also known as Surya Lesmana (20 May 1944 – 8 August 2012) was an Indonesian association football player and manager. Lesmana played midfielder for Persija Jakarta and the Indonesia national team, He also played for Mackinnons in Hong Kong.

Lesmana died of a heart attack on 8 August 2012.
