= Henky Timisela =

Indonesian footballer (1937–2025)

Personal information
- Date of birth: 22 November 1937
- Place of birth: Soerabaja, Dutch East Indies
- Date of death: 26 September 2025 (aged 87)
- Place of death: Jakarta, Indonesia
- Position: Forward

Senior career*
| Years | Team | Apps | (Gls) |
| 1957–1962 | Persib Bandung | | |

International career
| 1958–1962 | Indonesia | 55 | (23) |
Medal record
Men's football
Representing Indonesia
Asian Games
| Bronze medal – third place | 1958 Tokyo |
- * Club domestic league appearances and goals

Henky Timisela (22 November 1937 – 26 September 2025) was an Indonesian professional football player who played as a forward. He played during the late 1950s to the early 1960s. He is recorded to have played 63 matches and scored 55 goals throughout his career representing the Indonesia national team (including non-FIFA matches). Upon his retirement, he pursued further education at the Faculty of Commerce at Hitotsubashi University, Tokyo.

Timisela was the son of a soldier of the Royal Netherlands East Indies Army Air Force. He had seven siblings, six of whom were also professional footballers. Three of his siblings, Freddy, Pietje, and Max Timisela, have also represented the Indonesia national team, while Jopie Timisela has coached the national team at youth level.

In 2014, the Ministry of Youth and Sports (Kemenpora) published a book that highlighted his story, titled Henky Timisela: Wonder Boy Sepak Bola Indonesia, written by Sumohadi Marsis.

Timisela died on 26 September 2025, at the age of 87.

== Career statistics ==
Scores and results list Indonesia's goal tally first, score column indicates score after each Timisela goal. The list is incomplete.

List of international goals scored by Henky Timisela
| No. | Date | Venue | Opponent | Score | Result | Competition |
|---|---|---|---|---|---|---|
| 1 | 11 February 1959 | Ikada Stadium, Djakarta, Indonesia | East Germany | 1–0 | 2–2 | Friendly |
| 2 | 11 February 1959 | Ikada Stadium, Djakarta, Indonesia | East Germany | 2–0 | 2–2 | Friendly |
| 3 | 14 April 1960 | Calcutta, India | India | 2–4 | 2–4 | 1960 Summer Olympics qualification |
| 4 | 8 August 1960 | Stadium Merdeka, Kuala Lumpur, Malaysia | Singapore | 1–1 | 8–3 | 1960 Merdeka Tournament |
| 5 | 8 August 1960 | Stadium Merdeka, Kuala Lumpur, Malaysia | Singapore | 2–1 | 8–3 | 1960 Merdeka Tournament |
| 6 | 8 August 1960 | Stadium Merdeka, Kuala Lumpur, Malaysia | Singapore | 4–1 | 8–3 | 1960 Merdeka Tournament |
| 7 | 8 August 1960 | Stadium Merdeka, Kuala Lumpur, Malaysia | Singapore | 5–1 | 8–3 | 1960 Merdeka Tournament |
| 8 | 13 August 1960 | Stadium Merdeka, Kuala Lumpur, Malaysia | South Vietnam | 4–2 | 5–3 | 1960 Merdeka Tournament |
| 9 | 13 August 1960 | Stadium Merdeka, Kuala Lumpur, Malaysia | South Vietnam | 5–3 | 5–3 | 1960 Merdeka Tournament |
| 10 | 14 August 1960 | Stadium Merdeka, Kuala Lumpur, Malaysia | Pakistan | 2–0 | 4–0 | 1960 Merdeka Tournament |
| 11 | 17 August 1960 | Jalan Besar Stadium, Kallang, Singapore | South Vietnam | 1–0 | 1–1 | Friendly |
| 12 | 2 August 1961 | Stadium Merdeka, Kuala Lumpur, Malaysia | Singapore | 1–0 | 1–0 | 1961 Merdeka Tournament |
| 13 | 9 August 1961 | Stadium Merdeka, Kuala Lumpur, Malaysia | Thailand | 2–0 | 2–1 | 1961 Merdeka Tournament |
| 14 | 12 August 1961 | Stadium Merdeka, Kuala Lumpur, Malaysia | South Korea | 1–1 | 1–1 | 1961 Merdeka Tournament |
| 15 | 13 August 1961 | Stadium Merdeka, Kuala Lumpur, Malaysia | Malaya | 1–0 | 2–1 | 1961 Merdeka Tournament |
| 16 | 12 July 1962 | Jalan Besar Stadium, Kallang, Singapore | Singapore | 1–0 | 2–1 | Friendly |
| 17 | 18 August 1962 | Jalan Besar Stadium, Kallang, Singapore | Malaya | 1–1 | 2–3 | 1962 Asian Games |
| 18 | 18 August 1962 | Jalan Besar Stadium, Kallang, Singapore | Malaya | 2–3 | 2–3 | 1962 Asian Games |
| 19 | 11 September 1962 | Stadium Merdeka, Kuala Lumpur, Malaysia | Singapore | 2–0 | 2–0 | 1962 Merdeka Tournament |
| 20 | 14 September 1962 | Stadium Merdeka, Kuala Lumpur, Malaysia | South Vietnam | 2–1 | 2–1 | 1962 Merdeka Tournament |
| 21 | 17 September 1962 | Stadium Merdeka, Kuala Lumpur, Malaysia | South Korea | 1–0 | 3–0 | 1962 Merdeka Tournament |
| 22 | 17 September 1962 | Stadium Merdeka, Kuala Lumpur, Malaysia | South Korea | 3–0 | 3–0 | 1962 Merdeka Tournament |
| 23 | 19 September 1962 | Stadium Merdeka, Kuala Lumpur, Malaysia | Pakistan | 2–1 | 2–1 | 1962 Merdeka Tournament |

== Honours ==
Persib Bandung

- Perserikatan: 1959–61; runner-up 1957–59

Indonesia

- Merdeka Tournament: 1961, 1962
- Asian Games bronze medal: 1958

Individual

- Merdeka Tournament top scorer: 1962

== Bibliography ==
- Marsis, Sumohadi (2014). Henky Timisela: Wonder Boy Sepak Bola Indonesia (in Indonesian) (1st ed.). Jakarta: Kemenpora.
- Kadir, Jusuf (1982). Sepak bola Indonesia: sistem blok, total-football, mencetak gol, catenaccio (in Indonesian) (1st ed.). Indonesia: Gramedia. pp. 17–18.
