= 1962 Merdeka Tournament =

Tournament details
- Host country: Federation of Malaya
- Dates: 8 September – 19 September
- Teams: 9
- Venue: 1 (in 1 host city)

Final positions
- Champions: Indonesia (1st title)
- Runners-up: Pakistan
- Third place: Malaya
- Fourth place: South Korea B

Tournament statistics
- Matches played: 18
- Goals scored: 65 (3.61 per match)

The 1962 Merdeka Tournament (Malay: 1962 Pestabola Merdeka) was the sixth invitational international association football championship held to commemorate the independence of Malaya. Hosted by Malaya, the competition ran from 8 to 19 September 1962 and was contested by the national teams of Burma, Indonesia, Japan, Malaya, Pakistan, the Philippines, Singapore and South Vietnam as well as the B team of South Korea.

After two rounds of play, Indonesia were crowned champions of the competition after defeating Pakistan 2–1 in the final. In the third-place play-off, Malaya defeated South Korea 3–1.

== Background ==
The Merdeka Tournament was founded in 1957 as a means to celebrate Independence Day in Malaya. It is the oldest invitational international association football tournament in Asia. Indonesia were the defending champions after defeating Malaya in the final of the previous edition in 1961. Malaya were the most successful team in the history of the competition having won the title on three occasions.

Israel and Thailand were originally invited to participate in the competition. However, Thailand withdrew on 31 August 1957 and Israel rescinded their invitation four days later.

The Korea Football Association sent a B team to contest the tournament while the first team were participating in the later stages of the 1962 Asian Games in Jakarta, Indonesia.

== Format ==
In total, nine teams took part in the competition. They were drawn into two single round robin groups – one of four teams and one of five teams. The group winners would contest the final and the group runners-up contested the third-place play-off.

=== Participants ===
- Burma
- Indonesia
- Japan
- Malaya
- Pakistan
- Philippines
- Singapore
- South Korea B
- South Vietnam

== Group stage ==
=== Group A ===
Indonesia advanced to the final and South Korea B advanced to the third-place play-off.

==== Table ====
Team	Pld	W	D	L	GF	GA	GD	Pts
Indonesia	4	4	0	0	16	1	+15	8
South Korea B	4	3	0	1	8	5	+3	6
South Vietnam	4	1	1	2	9	7	+2	3
Singapore	4	1	1	2	7	6	+1	3
Philippines	4	0	0	4	2	23	–21	0

==== Matches ====
9 September 1962

South Korea B	3–2	Philippines
Lim Kook Chan 1', 17' (?)		Wieneke 64', 65'

Merdeka Stadium, Kuala Lumpur
Referee: Oei Poh Hwa

11 September 1962

Indonesia	2–0	Singapore

Merdeka Stadium, Kuala Lumpur
11 September 1962

South Korea B	3–0	South Vietnam

Merdeka Stadium, Kuala Lumpur

12 September 1962

Indonesia	9–0	Philippines
Solong 7', 35', 61'; Timisela 30', 79'; Majorijus 51'; Suwarman 53'; Tahir 66'

Merdeka Stadium, Kuala Lumpur

13 September 1962

Singapore	5–0	Philippines

Merdeka Stadium, Kuala Lumpur

14 September 1962

Indonesia	2–1	South Vietnam

Merdeka Stadium, Kuala Lumpur

15 September 1962

South Korea B	2–0	Singapore

Merdeka Stadium, Kuala Lumpur

16 September 1962

South Vietnam	6–0	Philippines
Van Quang; Thoi Vinh; Van Yen; Tran Tu; Tran Ta (x2)

Merdeka Stadium, Kuala Lumpur

17 September 1962

South Vietnam	2–2	Singapore

Merdeka Stadium, Kuala Lumpur
17 September 1962

South Korea B	0–3	Indonesia

Merdeka Stadium, Kuala Lumpur

=== Group B ===
Pakistan advanced to the final and Malaya advanced to the third-place play-off.

==== Table ====
Team	Pld	W	D	L	GF	GA	GD	Pts
Pakistan	3	1	2	0	2	1	+1	5
Malaya	3	1	2	0	5	4	+1	4
Burma	3	1	0	2	5	5	0	2
Japan	3	0	2	1	4	6	–2	2

==== Matches ====
8 September 1962

Malaya	2–2	Japan

Merdeka Stadium, Kuala Lumpur

9 September 1962

Pakistan	1–0	Burma

Merdeka Stadium, Kuala Lumpur

12 September 1962

Pakistan	1–1	Japan

Merdeka Stadium, Kuala Lumpur

13 September 1962

Malaya	3–2	Burma

Merdeka Stadium, Kuala Lumpur

15 September 1962

Burma	3–1	Japan

Merdeka Stadium, Kuala Lumpur

16 September 1962

Malaya	0–0	Pakistan

Merdeka Stadium, Kuala Lumpur

== Third-place play-off ==
Malaya defeated South Korea B to finish third.

19 September 1962

Malaya	3–1	South Korea B
Mahat Ambu 3'; Richard Choe 47'; Robert 56'		Woo Jin 72'

Merdeka Stadium, Kuala Lumpur

== Final ==
Indonesia defeated Pakistan 2–1 to win the competition.

19 September 1962

Indonesia	2–1	Pakistan
Solong Hajah 35'; Timisela 36'		Moosa 28'

Merdeka Stadium, Kuala Lumpur
Attendance: 30,000
