= 1969 King's Cup =

Tournament details
- Host country: Thailand
- Dates: 19–28 November
- Teams: 8 (from 2 confederations)
- Venue: 1 (in 1 host city)

Final positions
- Champions: South Korea (1st title)
- Runners-up: Indonesia
- Third place: South Vietnam
- Fourth place: Laos

Tournament statistics
- Matches played: 16
- Goals scored: 54 (3.38 per match)

The 1969 King's Cup (Thai: คิงส์คัพ 1969) was the second invitational international association football championship organised by the Football Association of Thailand. Staged in Bangkok, the competition ran from 19 to 28 November 1969 and was contested by the national teams of Indonesia, Laos, Malaysia, Singapore, South Korea, South Vietnam and Thailand as well as a representative team from Western Australia.

After two rounds of play, defending champions Indonesia and South Korea contested the final. In a tightly contested match, South Korea narrowly edged out Indonesia 1–0 to win the competition. In the third-place play-off, South Vietnam defeated Laos 7–0.

== Background ==
The King's Cup was founded in 1968 and was inspired by the success of the Merdeka Tournament – an annual invitational international association football championship founded in 1957 and held to celebrate Independence Day in Malaysia. Indonesia were the defending champions after defeating Burma 1–0 in the final of the inaugural edition.

== Format ==
In total, eight teams took part in the competition. They were drawn into two single round robin groups of four teams. The group winners and runners-up would then contest the semi-finals which would determine the teams contesting the final and the third-place play-off.

=== Participants ===
- Indonesia
- Laos
- Malaysia
- Singapore
- South Korea
- South Vietnam
- Thailand
- Western Australia

== Group stage ==
=== Group A ===
South Korea and Laos advanced to the semi-finals.

==== Table ====
Pos	Team	Pld	W	D	L	GF	GA	GAv	Pts	Qualification
1	South Korea	3	2	1	0	4	0	—	5	Advance to semi-finals
2	Laos	3	1	1	1	5	6	0.833	3	Advance to semi-finals
3	Thailand	3	0	2	1	5	6	0.833	2	
4	Malaysia	3	0	2	1	3	5	0.600	2	

==== Matches ====
19 November 1969

Malaysia	2–2	Thailand

19 November 1969

Laos	0–2	South Korea

21 November 1969

Laos	4–3	Thailand

21 November 1969

South Korea	2–0	Malaysia

23 November 1969

South Korea	0–0	Thailand

23 November 1969

Laos	1–1	Malaysia

=== Group B ===
Indonesia and South Vietnam advanced to the semi-finals.

==== Table ====
Pos	Team	Pld	W	D	L	GF	GA	GAv	Pts	Qualification
1	Indonesia	3	2	0	1	8	5	1.600	4	Advance to semi-finals
2	South Vietnam	3	1	1	1	5	5	1.000	3	Advance to semi-finals
3	Singapore	3	1	1	1	5	6	0.833	3	
4	Western Australia	3	1	0	2	5	7	0.714	2	

==== Matches ====
19 November 1969

Western Australia	1–3	South Vietnam

19 November 1969

Indonesia	2–3	Singapore

21 November 1969

Western Australia	3–1	Singapore

21 November 1969

Indonesia	3–1	South Vietnam

23 November 1969

Western Australia	1–3	Indonesia

23 November 1969

Singapore	1–1	South Vietnam

== Semi-finals ==
South Korea defeated South Vietnam and Indonesia defeated Laos to advance to the final.

26 November 1969

South Korea	3–0	South Vietnam

26 November 1969

Indonesia	3–1	Laos

== Third-place play-off ==
South Vietnam defeated Laos to finish third.

28 November 1969

Laos	0–7	South Vietnam

== Final ==
South Korea defeated Indonesia to win the competition.

28 November 1969

Indonesia	0–1	South Korea
