= Aang Witarsa =

Indonesian footballer

Personal information
- Full name: Aang Witarsa
- Date of birth: 8 December 1930
- Place of birth: Bandung, Dutch East Indies
- Date of death: 8 August 1998 (aged 67)
- Place of death: Bandung, Dutch East Indies
- Position: Forward

Senior career*
| Years | Team | Apps | (Gls) |
| 1948–1959 | Persib Bandung | 43 | (14) |

International career
| 1951–1959 | Indonesia | 20 | (4) |
- * Club domestic league appearances and goals

Aang Witarsa (8 December 1930 – 8 August 1998) was an Indonesian footballer. He competed in the men's tournament at the 1956 Summer Olympics.

== Statistics ==
Aang Witarsa: International goals
| No. | Date | Venue | Opponent | Score | Result | Competition |
|---|---|---|---|---|---|---|
| 1 | 12 May 1957 | Djakarta, Indonesia | China | 2–0 | 2–0 | 1958 FIFA World Cup qualification |
| 2 | 2 June 1957 | Beijing, Indonesia | China | ?–1 | 4–3 | 1958 FIFA World Cup qualification |
| 3 | 2 June 1957 | Beijing, Indonesia | China | ?–1 | 4–3 | 1958 FIFA World Cup qualification |

*This is an incomplete list

== Honours ==
Persib Bandung

- Perserikatan: 1950
