= 1958 Merdeka Tournament =

Tournament details
- Host country: Federation of Malaya
- Dates: 30 August – 4 September
- Teams: 5
- Venue: 1 (in 1 host city)

Final positions
- Champions: Malaya (1st title)
- Runners-up: Hong Kong
- Third place: Indonesia
- Fourth place: Singapore

Tournament statistics
- Matches played: 10
- Goals scored: 38 (3.8 per match)

The 1958 Merdeka Tournament (Malay: 1958 Pestabola Merdeka) was the second invitational international association football championship held to commemorate the independence of Malaya. Hosted by Malaya, the competition ran from 30 August to 4 September 1958 and was contested by the national teams of Hong Kong, Indonesia, Malaya, Singapore and South Vietnam.

Played as a round-robin tournament, Malaya were crowned champions of the competition after defeating South Vietnam 2–0 in their final match.

== Background ==
The Merdeka Tournament was founded in 1957 as a means to celebrate Independence Day in Malaya. It is the oldest invitational international association football tournament in Asia. The inaugural tournament was won by a Hong Kong League XI.

== Format ==
In a change to the format from the inaugural season, there were no knock-out ties prior to the group stage and, as a result, no consolation round. Instead, all five teams contested a single round robin group to decide the winners of the competition.

=== Participants ===
- Hong Kong
- Indonesia
- Malaya
- Singapore
- South Vietnam

== Summary ==
The tournament began on 30 August 1958 when Malaya defeated Indonesia 3–2 and Singapore and South Vietnam played out a 4–4 draw. The following day, Hong Kong defeated South Vietnam 5–3 and Indonesia won 2–0 against Singapore. Malaya then defeated Hong Kong 3–0 on 1 September. With half the matches played, Malaya were top of the standings with four points ahead of Hong Kong and Indonesia on two points and Singapore and South Vietnam on one point.

The following day, Malaya and Singapore drew goalless and Indonesia recorded a 4–1 win against South Vietnam. On 3 September, Hong Kong defeated Singapore 2–0. The following day, in the final round of fixtures, Malaya won the competition by defeating South Vietnam 2–0 and Hong Kong defeated Indonesia 2–1.

== Table ==
Team	Pld	W	D	L	GF	GA	GD	Pts	Result
Malaya	4	3	1	0	8	2	+6	7	Champions
Hong Kong	4	3	0	1	9	7	+2	6	
Indonesia	4	2	0	2	9	6	+3	4	
Singapore	4	0	2	2	4	8	−4	2	
South Vietnam	4	0	1	3	8	15	−7	1	

== Matches ==
30 August 1958

Malaya	3–2	Indonesia

30 August 1958

Singapore	4–4	South Vietnam

31 August 1958

Hong Kong	5–3	South Vietnam

31 August 1958

Indonesia	2–0	Singapore

1 September 1958

Malaya	3–0	Hong Kong

2 September 1958

Malaya	0–0	Singapore

2 September 1958

Indonesia	4–1	South Vietnam

3 September 1958

Hong Kong	2–0	Singapore

4 September 1958

Malaya	2–0	South Vietnam

4 September 1958

Hong Kong	2–1	Indonesia
