= Max Timisela =

Indonesian footballer

Personal information
- Date of birth: 7 June 1944 (age 82)
- Place of birth: Bandung, Indonesia

Senior career*
Years	Team	Apps	(Gls)
- Persib Bandung

International career
1963–1970	Indonesia		
- * Club domestic league appearances and goals

Max Timisela (6 July 1944) is an Indonesian former footballer who played as a forward. He represented the Indonesia national team from 1963 to 1970. He was a part of Persib Bandung that won the Perserikatan in 1962.

== Early career ==
Timisela's early career started at Cimahi. In the 1950s, when he was at Junior High School, he signed into UNI Bandung following his brothers. From there, the chance to sign into Persib opened.

Finally, Timisela started to play for Persib in 1962. As other young players, started into the bench. After three years, he made it into Persib's starting eleven.

== International career ==
Timisela was called up for Indonesia in 1963. In 1965, he toured Europe with the PSSI team, playing against the Netherlands, West Germany, Bulgaria, and Yugoslavia.

== Personal life ==
Max is the youngest son of a soldier of the Royal Netherlands East Indies Army Air Force. He has seven siblings, six of whom were also professional footballers. Three of his siblings, Freddy, Pietje, and Henky Timisela, have also represented the Indonesia national team, while Jopie Timisela has coached the national team at youth level.
