= 1968 King's Cup =

Tournament details
- Host country: Thailand
- Dates: 20 November – 2 December
- Teams: 6 (from 1 confederation)
- Venue: 1 (in 1 host city)

Final positions
- Champions: Indonesia (1st title)
- Runners-up: Burma
- Third place: Thailand
- Fourth place: Malaysia

Tournament statistics
- Matches played: 13
- Goals scored: 46 (3.54 per match)

The 1968 King's Cup (Thai: คิงส์คัพ 1968) was the inauguaral invitational international association football championship organised by the Football Association of Thailand. Staged in Bangkok, the competition ran from 20 November to 2 December 1968 and was contested by the national teams of Burma, Indonesia, Laos, Malaysia, Singapore and Thailand.

After three rounds of play, Indonesia and Burma contested the final. In a tightly contested match, Indonesia narrowly edged out Burma 1–0 to win the competition.

== Background ==
The King's Cup was founded in 1968 and was inspired by the success of the Merdeka Tournament – an annual invitational international association football championship founded in 1957 and held to celebrate Independence Day in Malaysia.

== Format ==
In total, six teams took part in the competition. Group allocation matches were held to decide which group each team would enter in the group stage. They then contested two single round robin groups of three teams. The group winners and runners-up would contest the semi-finals which would determine the teams contesting the final and the third-place play-off.

=== Participants ===
- Burma
- Indonesia
- Laos
- Malaysia
- Singapore
- Thailand

== Group allocation matches ==
The winners of matches one (Burma) and three (Indonesia) entered group 1 along with the loser of match two (Singapore). The remaining teams (Laos, Thailand and Malaysia) entered group 2.

20 November 1968

Burma	3–0	Laos

20 November 1968

Thailand	3–0	Singapore

21 November 1968

Malaysia	0–1	Indonesia

== Group stage ==
=== Group 1 ===
Thailand and Malaysia advanced to the semi-finals.

==== Table ====
Pos	Team	Pld	W	D	L	GF	GA	GAv	Pts	Qualification
1	Thailand	2	2	0	0	4	0	—	4	Advance to semi-finals
2	Malaysia	2	1	0	1	5	3	1.667	2	Advance to semi-finals
3	Laos	2	0	0	2	0	6	0.000	0	

==== Matches ====
22 November 1968

Thailand	1–0	Laos

24 November 1968

Laos	0–5	Malaysia

26 November 1968

Thailand	3–0	Malaysia

=== Group 2 ===
Indonesia and Burma advanced to the semi-finals.

==== Table ====
Pos	Team	Pld	W	D	L	GF	GA	GAv	Pts	Qualification
1	Indonesia	2	2	0	0	10	1	10.000	4	Advance to semi-finals
2	Burma	2	1	0	1	3	3	1.000	2	Advance to semi-finals
3	Singapore	2	0	0	2	0	9	0.000	0	

==== Matches ====
22 November 1968

Burma	2–0	Singapore

24 November 1968

Indonesia	3–1	Burma

26 November 1968

Singapore	0–7	Indonesia

== Semi-finals ==
Indonesia defeated Malaysia and Burma defeated Thailand to advance to the final.

28 November 1968

Indonesia	6–1	Malaysia

29 November 1968

Thailand	0–2	Burma

== Third-place play-off ==
Thailand defeated Malaysia to finish third.

1 December 1968

Thailand	6–0	Malaysia

== Final ==
Indonesia defeated Burma to win the competition.

2 December 1968

Indonesia	1–0	Burma
