= Ikada Stadium =

Former multi purpose stadium in Indonesia

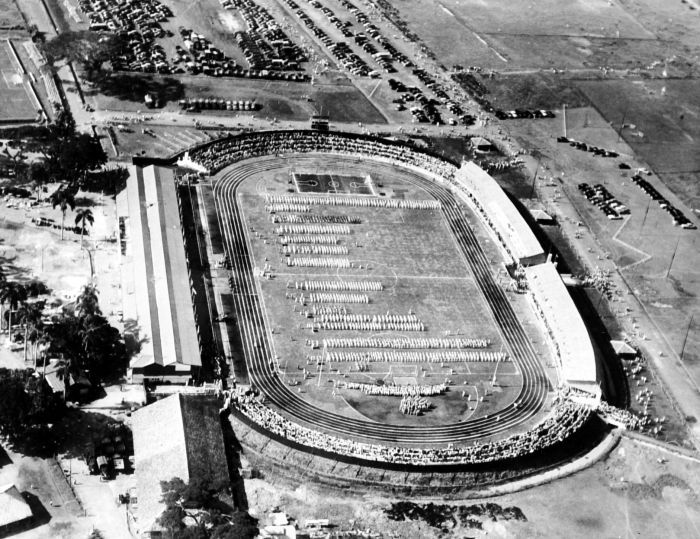
- Interactive map of Ikada Stadium
- Full name: Ikada Stadium
- Location: Jakarta, Indonesia
- Coordinates: 6.176683°S 106.827834°E
- Capacity: 15,000

Construction
- Opened: 1951
- Closed: 1962
- Demolished: 1963

Tenant
- Indonesia national football team (1951–1962)

Ikada Stadium was a multi-purpose stadium in Jakarta, Indonesia, designed by Indonesian modern architect Liem Bwan Tjie. The name Ikada only appeared during the Japanese occupation as an abbreviation of Ikatan Atletik Djakarta (Jakarta Athletic Association). This field was established in colonial times by Governor-General Herman Willem Daendels (1818) and was first called Champ de Mars because it coincided with the conquest of the Netherlands by Napoleon Bonaparte. When the Dutch succeeded in reclaiming their country from France, the name was changed to Koningsplein (King's Field) but people preferred to call it Gambir Field, which is now immortalized as the name of the nearby train station.

After the recognition of independence, it was used as a stadium for the Indonesian national football team as well as the Indonesian National Games in 1951. The capacity of the stadium was 30,000 spectators. It was the largest stadium in Jakarta before being replaced by Gelora Bung Karno Stadium in 1962. The stadium was demolished in 1963 to make way for the Indonesian National Monument. The site is now known as Merdeka Square.

== Ikada great meeting ==
The Ikada Field Great Meeting took place on September 19, 1945, when President Sukarno gave a short speech in front of thousands of people at Ikada Field in commemoration of one month of the Proclamation of Indonesian Independence. In various places, the community, spearheaded by youth, held meetings and mobilizations to round up determination to welcome independence. At Ikada Square Jakarta on September 19, 1945 a general meeting was held spearheaded by the Action Van Committee.

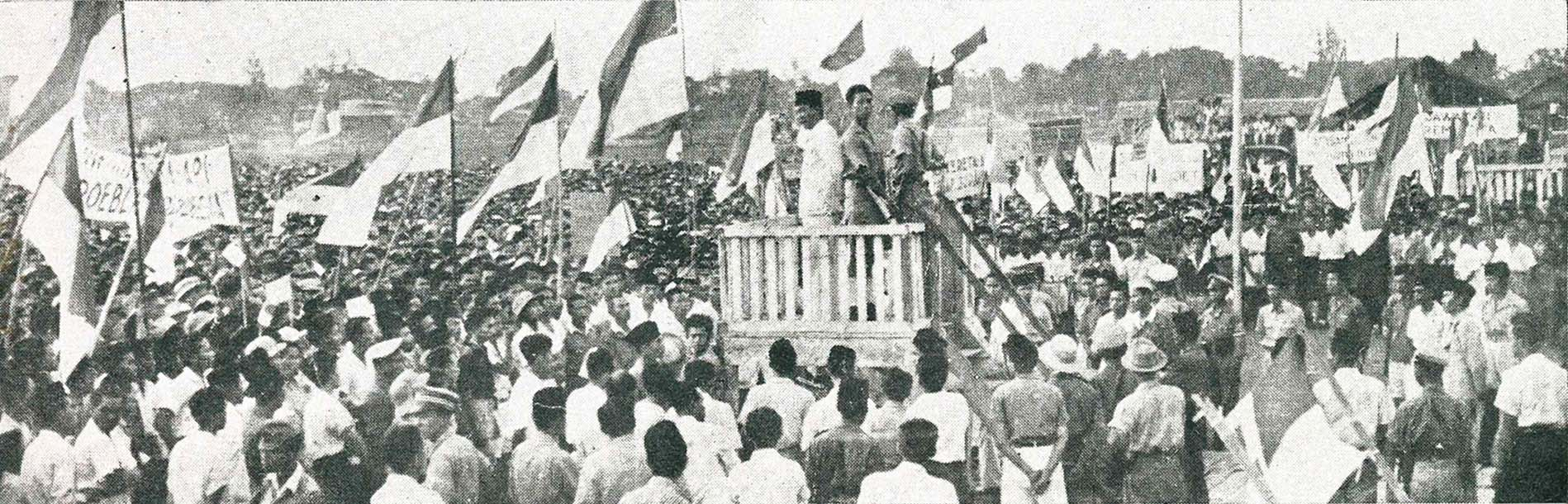
President Sukarno making a speech at the Ikada Field

The meaning of the great meeting at Ikada Field includes the following The meeting succeeded in bringing together the government of the Republic of Indonesia and its people, The meeting is a manifestation of the authority of the government of the Republic of Indonesia towards the people, Instill confidence that the Indonesian people are able to change their destiny with their own strength, The people support the newly formed government. The proof is, they carry out every instruction from their leaders.

== See also ==
- Merdeka Square
- Proclamation of Indonesian Independence

== Bibliography ==
- Bell, Daniel (2003). Encyclopedia of International Games. McFarland. ISBN 9781476615271.
- Merrillees, Scott (2015). Jakarta: Portraits of a Capital 1950-1980. Jakarta: Equinox Publishing. ISBN 9786028397308.
