= Sri Lanka national football team results (1949–1979) =

- Win Draw Loss

Sri Lanka national football team fixtures and results between 1949 and 1979 are as follows:

== Results ==
=== 1949 ===
26 April 1949 Friendly	Ceylon	0–1	India	Colombo, Ceylon
		Report	Noor 4' (o.g.)	Stadium: Government Services Ground; Referee: P.L. Pestonjee (Ceylon)

29 April 1949 Friendly	Ceylon	1–6	India	Colombo, Ceylon
	Tofts	Report	Raman; Dhanraj; Prasad	Stadium: Government Services Ground; Referee: Sgt. Boulton (Ceylon)

=== 1952 ===
9 March 1952 1952 Asian Quadrangular Football Tournament	Ceylon	0–2	India	Colombo, Ceylon
		Report	Venkatesh 13', 20'; Sheoo Mewalal 15'	Stadium: Colombo Oval, Colombo; Referee: Mr. A. Roy (India)

18 March 1952 1952 Asian Quadrangular Football Tournament	Ceylon	0–2	Pakistan	Colombo, Ceylon
		Report	Wahid 8'; Kutty 34'	Stadium: Colombo Oval, Colombo; Referee: U. Kim Teikh (Burma)

=== 1953 ===
24 October 1953 1953 Asian Quadrangular Football Tournament	Burma	3–2	Ceylon	Rangoon, Burma
	Samuel 22', 60', 64'	Report	Ossen 21'; Aziz 47'

27 October 1953 1953 Asian Quadrangular Football Tournament	India	2–0	Ceylon	Rangoon, Burma
	Venkatesh (?); Khan 35'	Report

2 November 1953 1953 Asian Quadrangular Football Tournament	Pakistan	6–0	Ceylon	Rangoon, Burma
	Akbar 7'; Jamil 10', 13'; Gunaid 11' (o.g.); Kutty 37', 42'	Report

5 November 1953 Friendly	Burma	7–9	Ceylon	Rangoon, Burma
	Boomgardt (?) ? (?)	Report	Azeez (?); K. Fernando (?); A. Fernando (?); Unknown (?)

=== 1954 ===
18 December 1954 1954 Asian Quadrangular Football Tournament	Pakistan	2–1	Ceylon	Calcutta, India
	Jamil; Amin	Report	M. Sainoon

21 December 1954 1954 Asian Quadrangular Football Tournament	India	1–1	Ceylon	Calcutta, India
	N. Mohammed (?)	Report	A. Fernando (?)	Stadium: Eden Gardens

25 December 1954 1954 Asian Quadrangular Football Tournament	Ceylon	2–1	Burma	Calcutta, India
	T.M. Deen (?); A. Fernando (?)	Report	Htoo Wa

=== 1955 ===
18 December 1955 1955 Asian Quadrangular Football Tournament	India	4–3	Ceylon	Dacca, East Pakistan
	Banerjee (?); Mewalal; Sattar	Report; Report	Ranasinghe (?); A. Fernando	Stadium: Dacca Stadium

21 December 1955 1955 Asian Quadrangular Football Tournament	Pakistan	2–1	Ceylon	Dacca, East Pakistan
	Fakhri (?)	FIFA; RSSSF; Report	Ranasinghe	Stadium: Dacca Stadium; Attendance: 20,000

25 December 1955 1955 Asian Quadrangular Football Tournament	Burma	3–1	Ceylon	Dacca, East Pakistan
	Suk Bahadur (?); Aung Myint	Report; Report	Sainoon	Stadium: Dacca Stadium

=== 1956 ===
26 August 1956 Friendly	Ceylon	3–5	Pakistan	Colombo, Ceylon
	Ranasinghe 31' (pen.), 32'; A. Fernando 46'	Report	Qayyum 27', 50' (pen.); Hanif 29'; Talib 34'; Umer 61'	Stadium: Government Services Ground

1 September 1956 Friendly	Ceylon	2–2	Pakistan	Colombo, Ceylon
	Ranasinghe 20' (pen.); A. Fernando 73'	Report	Talib 50'; Umer 75'	Stadium: Government Services Ground

=== 1963 ===
27 November 1963 1964 Olympic Q. P.R.	Ceylon	3–5	India	Colombo, Ceylon
	Mahinda (?); Sirisena (?)	Report	Appalaraju 11' (?), 80'; Y. Khan (?)	Stadium: Sugathadasa Stadium; Attendance: 30,000; Referee: I. Mansoor (Malaysia)

7 December 1963 1964 Olympic Q. P.R.	India	7–0	Ceylon	Bangalore, India
	Appalaraju (?); Sarmad Khan (?); I. Singh (?); Samajpati (?)	Report		Stadium: Sree Kanteerava Stadium; Attendance: 30,000; Referee: U Kyin Maung Aye (Burma)

=== 1964 ===
East Germany also played against Ceylon Army in 8 January ending in 0–14.

12 January 1964 Friendly	Ceylon	1–12	East Germany	Ceylon
	D.Walles 70'	Report	Heino 1', 40', 62', 88'; Wolfgang 3', 61'; Hermann 20', 47', 89'; Jürgen 37'; Gerd 42'; Otto 79'	Stadium: Sugathadasa Stadium; Attendance: 28,000; Referee: Mantare(SRI)

23 February 1964 Friendly	Ceylon	3–9	Indonesia	Ceylon
	Amidon; N/A; N/A	Report	Komar; N/A; N/A; N/A; N/A; N/A

29 February 1964 Friendly	Ceylon	2–4	Indonesia	Ceylon
		Report

=== 1965 ===
28 February 1965 Friendly	Ceylon	3–1	Pakistan	Colombo, Ceylon
	Amidon (?) de Silva 60'; Zainulabdeen (?)	Report	Umer (?)	Stadium: Sugathadasa Stadium; Attendance: 40,000

7 March 1965 Friendly	Ceylon	0–0	Pakistan	Colombo, Ceylon
		Report		Stadium: Sugathadasa Stadium

29 April 1965 Friendly	Indonesia	5–0	Ceylon	Indonesia

=== 1966 ===
5 April 1966 Friendly	Ceylon	0–3	Burma	Colombo, Ceylon
				Stadium: Sugathadasa Stadium

8 April 1966 Friendly	Ceylon	1–3	Burma	Colombo, Ceylon
		Report		Stadium: Sugathadasa Stadium

=== 1968 ===
17 March 1968 1968 Olympic Q.	Israel	7–0	Ceylon	Bloomfield Stadium, Tel Aviv, Israel
	George Borba 1', 63'; Mordechai Spiegler 11', 59', 85'; W.N.C. Perera 30' (o.g.); Giora Spiegel 47'	Report		Attendance: 14,000; Referee: Wanchai Suwaree (Thailand)

22 March 1968 1968 Olympic Q.	Israel	4–0	Ceylon	Bloomfield Stadium, Tel Aviv, Israel
	Giora Spiegel 55'; Rahamim Talbi 62'; Shmuel Rosenthal 66'; George Borba 77'	Report		Attendance: 10,000; Referee: Joseph Heymann (Switzerland)

=== 1971 ===
13 December 1971 Asian Cup Q.	Iraq	5–0	Ceylon	Kuwait
	Kadhim 32', 42', 69'; Kamil 51'; Khalaf 88'	Report		Referee: Sarkis Demirdjian (Lebanon)

16 December 1971 Asian Cup Q.	Jordan	2–1	Ceylon	Kuwait
		Report

20 December 1971 Asian Cup Q.	Bahrain	3–0	Ceylon	Kuwait
		Report

=== 1972 ===
22 March 1972 1972 Olympic Q.	Israel	3–0	Ceylon	Rangoon, Burma
	Calderon 12'; Dror Bar-Nur 52'; Borba 70'			Stadium: Bogyoke Aung San Stadium

24 March 1972 1972 Olympic Q.	Burma	5–1	Ceylon	Rangoon, Burma
	Than Soe 20', 80'; Aye Maung Lay 38'; Win Maung 55'; Khin Maung Tint 73'		Fawzeer 60'	Stadium: Bogyoke Aung San Stadium

26 March 1972 1972 Olympic Q.	Thailand	5–0	Ceylon	Rangoon, Burma
	Sudsa-ard 17', 27', 29'; Suvantada 39'; Kitboon 44'			Stadium: Bogyoke Aung San Stadium

7 June 1972 Jakarta Anniversary t.	Malaysia	3–0	Sri Lanka	Jakarta

9 June 1972 Jakarta Anniversary t.	Burma	4–2	Sri Lanka	Jakarta
	Maung Soe Myint 52'; Maung Myint Kyu 70'; Maung Sein Win Lay; Maung Khin Maung Tint	Report	Hassimdeen 28'; Perera 40'

11 June 1972 Jakarta Anniversary t.	Indonesia	8–0	Sri Lanka	Jakarta
	Jacob Sihasale (?); Abdul Kadir (?); Risdianto (?); Waskito (?)

13 June 1972 Jakarta Anniversary t.	Sri Lanka	3–1	Laos	Jakarta

23 June 1972 Friendly	Singapore	3–1	Sri Lanka	Singapore, Kallang
	Krishnan 6', 50'; Samad 10' (pen.)	Report	Preena 21'	Stadium: Jalan Besar Stadium

12 July 1972 Merdeka Tournament	Malaysia	4–1	Sri Lanka	Malaysia, Kuala Lumpur
	Hamzah Hussein 48'; S. Abdullah 56', 58', 61'		M. Nizarden 76'	Stadium: Merdeka Stadium; Attendance: 15.000

16 July 1972 Merdeka Tournament	Japan	5–0	Sri Lanka	Malaysia, Ipoh
	Kamamoto 5', 9', 58', 65', 89'			Stadium: Perak Stadium

20 July 1972 Merdeka Tournament	Philippines	4–1	Sri Lanka	Malaysia, Kuala Lumpur
	Juan Gutierrez 34'; M. Martinez 44'; I.Lozano 59'; Miguel Crame 63'		Hassimdeen 70'	Stadium: Merdeka Stadium

22 July 1972 Merdeka Tournament	Khmer Republic	6–1	Sri Lanka	Malaysia, Kuala Lumpur
	Doeur Soekhom 35'; Sea Cheng Eang 39', 66'; Sok Sun Seah 42'; Doeuk Miladord 63' (pen.), 87'		Hassimdeen 69'	Stadium: Merdeka Stadium

25 July 1972 Merdeka Tournament	Singapore	6–1	Sri Lanka	Malaysia, Kuala Lumpur
	S. P. Leong 24', 62', 84'; Samad 44', 56'; S. Rajagopal 87'		Clement da Silva 25'	Stadium: Merdeka Stadium

2 August 1972 1972 Pesta Sukan Cup	Singapore	6–1	Sri Lanka	Kallang, Singapore
	Samad 1', 25', 66', 72'; Arshad 51', 52'	Report	M.S. Dain (?)	Stadium: Jalan Besar Stadium

4 August 1972 1972 Pesta Sukan Cup	Hong Kong	2–1	Sri Lanka	Kallang, Singapore
	Wong Tak Choi 6' (?)	Report	Fawzeer (?)	Stadium: Jalan Besar Stadium

3 September 1972 Friendly	Sri Lanka	2–3	China	Sri Lanka

12 September 1972 Friendly	Sri Lanka	0–1	China	Sri Lanka

=== 1979 ===
2 May 1979 Asian Cup Q.	Malaysia	3–1	Sri Lanka	Bangkok

4 May 1979 Asian Cup Q.	Thailand	4–0	Sri Lanka	Bangkok

6 May 1979 Asian Cup Q.	Hong Kong	5–0	Sri Lanka	Bangkok

8 May 1979 Asian Cup Q.	Sri Lanka	4–0	Singapore	Bangkok
	Zaheer (?); Fernando (?)	Report

10 September 1979 President's Cup	Bahrain	1–0	Sri Lanka	South Korea, Seoul
15:45 UTC+9	Dosanghud 18'			Stadium: Seoul Stadium

12 September 1979 President's Cup	South Korea	6–0	Sri Lanka	South Korea, Daegu
18:45 UTC+9	Huh Jung-Moo 27'; Shin Hyun-Ho 36', 40'; Lee Jang-Soo 64'; Yoo Gun-Soo 71'; Lee Young-Moo 87'			Stadium: Daegu Civil Stadium

14 September 1979 President's Cup	Bangladesh	3–1	Sri Lanka	South Korea, Cheongju
14:00 UTC+9	Chunnu (?); Halim (?); Salahuddin (?)			Stadium: Cheongju Stadium

16 September 1979 President's Cup	Sudan	1–0	Sri Lanka	South Korea, Incheon
14:00 UTC+9	Abryu 71'			Stadium: Incheon Civil Stadium

22 November 1979 King's Cup	Thailand	5–1	Sri Lanka	Thailand
