= Philippines national football team results (1950–1979) =

This is a list of the Philippines national football team results from 1950 to 1979.

== 1977 ==
20 November 1977 Southeast Asian Games GS	Philippines	4–1	Brunei	Kuala Lumpur, Malaysia
	Benavidez 44', 52', 68', 70'	Report		Stadium: Merdeka Stadium

21 November 1977 Southeast Asian Games GS	Malaysia	5–0	Philippines	Kuala Lumpur, Malaysia
				Stadium: Merdeka Stadium

23 November 1977 Southeast Asian Games GS	Philippines	1–1	Indonesia	Kuala Lumpur, Malaysia
	Veloso 90'	Report	Andi Lala 30'	Stadium: Merdeka Stadium

== 1976 ==
14 March 1976 Summer Olympics qualification	Philippines	0–3	Japan	Tokyo, Japan
		Report	Ochiai 12', 73'; Takabayashi 17'	Stadium: National Stadium; Attendance: 25,000

17 March 1976 Summer Olympics qualification	Philippines	0–3	Japan	Tokyo, Japan
		Report	Fujishima 23', 44'; Maeda 72'	Stadium: National Stadium; Attendance: 2,000

8 April Aloha Soccer Festival	Philippines	1–0	Taiwan	Honolulu, United States
	Genato (?)	Report		Stadium: Aloha Stadium; Attendance: 21,705

== 1974 ==
3 September 1974 Asian Games R1	Japan	4–0	Philippines	Tehran, Iran
	Kamamoto 1', 15', 44'; Watanabe 76'	Report		Stadium: Amjadieh Stadium; Attendance: 21,705

6 September 1974 Asian Games R1	Israel	6–0	Philippines	Tehran, Iran
	Schweizer 16', 42'; Damti 24'; Shum 31'; Onana 41'; Feigenbaum 90'			Stadium: Aryamehr Stadium; Attendance: 60,000; Referee: Reza Heidari (Iran)

7 September 1974 Asian Games R1	Malaysia	11–0	Philippines	Tehran, Iran
		Report		Stadium: Persepolis Stadium

== 1972 ==
8 June 1972 Jakarta Anniversary Tournament	Singapore	0–2	Philippines	Jakarta

12 June 1972 Jakarta Anniversary Tournament	Philippines	1–0	Thailand	Jakarta

14 June 1972 Jakarta Anniversary Tournament	Khmer Republic	4–0	Philippines	Jakarta

14 July 1972 Merdeka Tournament	Malaysia	1–0	Philippines	Kuala Lumpur, Malaysia
	Veloso 86' (o.g.)	Report		Stadium: Merdeka Stadium

16 July 1972 Merdeka Tournament	Khmer Republic	2–2	Philippines	Kuala Lumpur, Malaysia
	Miladord 40'; Phalla 55'	Report	I. Lozano 32'; Crame 56'	Stadium: Merdeka Stadium

18 July 1972 Merdeka Tournament	Japan	5–1	Philippines	Kuala Lumpur, Malaysia
	Ogi 22' (pen.); Arai 38' 46'; Okudera 44'; Kamamoto 69'	Report	M. Martinez 62'	Stadium: Merdeka Stadium

20 July 1972 Merdeka Tournament	Philippines	4–1	Sri Lanka	Kuala Lumpur, Malaysia
	Gutierrez 34'; M. Martinez 44'; I.Lozano 59'; Crame 63'	Report	Hasshimdeen 70'	Stadium: Merdeka Stadium

2 August 1972 Pesta Sukan Cup	Indonesia	3–0	Philippines	Kallang, Singapore
	Risdianto 11', 57'; Abdul Kadir 32'	Report		Stadium: Jalan Besar Stadium; Attendance: 5,000; Referee: Major Ong

3 August 1972 Pesta Sukan Cup	Japan	4–1	Philippines	Singapore
	Kamamoto 29', 83'; Yoshimura 71'; T. Ojiro 75'	Report	Cuenca 33'

5 August 1972 Pesta Sukan Cup	Khmer Republic	?	Philippines	Singapore
		Report

21 September 1972 President's Cup Football Tournament	Burma	4–0	Philippines	Seoul, South Korea

23 September 1972 President's Cup Football Tournament	Singapore	5–0	Philippines	Seoul, South Korea
	Seak Poh Leong 11'; Arshad Khamis 15'; Lim Tien Jit 44'; Mohammed Nor 78', 86'	Report

23 September 1972 President's Cup Football Tournament	Philippines	0–11	Indonesia	South Korea
			Waskito 2', 8', 13', 50', 77'; Idris 13' 47' 62'; Sihasale 16' 22'; Kadir 36' 40'

29 October Friendly	Philippines	0–6	Australia	Manila, Philippines
		Report	Abonyi 29' (pen.); Buljevic 52'; Terry Butler 64'; Johnny Warren 66'; Utjesenovic 75'; Ray Richards 83'	Attendance: 4,000; Referee: Julian Esguarra (Philippines)

== 1971 ==
9 August 1971 Merdeka Tournament	Hong Kong	2–1	Philippines	Kuala Lumpur, Malaysia
	Tang Hung Cheong 39'; Lo Hung Hoi 80'	Report	Martínez 61'	Stadium: Merdeka Stadium; Attendance: 12,000

11 August 1971 Merdeka Tournament	Indonesia	3–1	Philippines	Kuala Lumpur, Malaysia
	Waskito 5'; Sihasale 22'; Abdillah 70'		Crame 32'	Stadium: Merdeka Stadium

14 August 1971 Merdeka Tournament	Burma	2–0	Philippines	Kuala Terengganu, Malaysia
	Than Soe 16', 88'			Attendance: Sultan Ismail Nasiruddin Shah Stadium

15 August 1971 Merdeka Tournament	Singapore	4–4	Philippines	Kuala Lumpur, Malaysia
	Quah Kim Lye 16'; Dollah 40'; Krishnan 56'; Ali 71'	Report	Cuenca 47'; Lozano 52' (pen.), 54'; Martínez 61'	Stadium: Merdeka Stadium

16 August 1971 Merdeka Tournament	India	5–1	Philippines	Kuala Lumpur, Malaysia
	S. Bhowmick 17', 50', 62'; Habib 38'; Thapa 42'	Report	Tomas Lozano 80'	Attendance: Merdeka Stadium

17 August 1971 Merdeka Tournament 11th place	Philippines	3–1	Thailand	Kuala Lumpur, Malaysia
	Martínez 16', 75'; Crame 70'	Report	? 36' (o.g.)	Stadium: Merdeka Stadium

24 August 1971 Pesta Sukan Cup	Thailand	1–0	Philippines	Kallang, Singapore
	Nut 36'	Report		Stadium: Jalan Besar Stadium; Referee: Bishan Singh (Singapore)

27 August 1971 Pesta Sukan Cup	South Korea	3–1	Philippines	Kallang, Singapore
	Kang Chong-tae (-); Kim Chin-kuk 50', 53'	Report	Lozano (-)	Stadium: Jalan Besar Stadium

25 September 1972 OQT	Philippines	3–0	Taiwan	Seoul, South Korea
	Crame 9'; Martínez 11'; Delgado 65'	Report

27 September 1972 OQT	Japan	8–1	Philippines	Seoul, South Korea
	Ogi 9' (pen.), 40'; Kamamoto 11', 52', 73'; Tomizawa 41'; Miyamoto 44'; Yoshimura 61'	Report	Martínez 62'

29 September 1972 OQT	South Korea	6–0	Philippines	Seoul, South Korea
	Park Soo-duk 49', 55', 85'; Chung Kyu-poong 60'; Choi Jae-mo 65'; Lee Cha-man 72'	Report

2 October 1972 OQT	Malaysia	5–0	Philippines	Seoul, South Korea
	Wong Choon Wah 20'; Looi Loon Teik 36', 67'; Syed Ahmad 45'; Mohammed Bakar 80'	Report

== 1967 ==
27 September 1967 1968 Summer Olympics qualification	Japan	15–0	Philippines	Tokyo, Japan
	Sugiyama 4', 75'; Ogi 5'; Kamamoto 15', 16', 26', 43', 64', 89'; Miyamoto 20', 30', 40', 46'; Watanabe 63'; Kuwahara 78'	Report		Stadium: National Stadium; Attendance: 7,939; Referee: Atef Sinan (Lebanon)

28 September 1967 1968 Summer Olympics qualification	Lebanon	11–1	Philippines	Tokyo, Japan
		Report	Pacheco 17'

3 October 1967 1968 Summer Olympics qualification	Taiwan	7–2	Philippines	Tokyo, Japan
		Report

7 October 1967 1968 Summer Olympics qualification	South Vietnam	10–0	Philippines	Tokyo, Japan
		Report

10 October 1967 1968 Summer Olympics qualification	South Korea	5–0	Philippines	Tokyo, Japan
		Report

== 1959 ==
29 March 1959 1960 AFC Asian Cup qualification	Philippines	0–7	Hong Kong	Manila, Philippines
			Lau Chi Lam; Ho Cheung Yau; Lau Kai Cheung; Leung Wai Hung	Stadium: Rizal Memorial Stadium; Attendance: 10,000

31 March 1959 1960 AFC Asian Cup qualification	Philippines	4–7	Taiwan	Manila, Philippines
				Stadium: Rizal Memorial Stadium; Attendance: 12,000

== 1958 ==
25 May 1958 1958 Asian Games	Hong Kong	4–1	Philippines	Tokyo, Japan

26 May 1958 1958 Asian Games	Philippines	1–0	Japan	Tokyo, Japan
				Stadium: Tokyo Football Stadium

30 May 1958 1958 Asian Games	Indonesia	5–2	Philippines	Tokyo, Japan

== 1956 ==
Unofficial friendly	Philippines	0–2	Japan	Manila, Philippines
		Report

Unofficial friendly	Philippines	0–3	Japan	Manila, Philippines
		Report

25 February 1956 1956 AFC Asian Cup qualification	Philippines	0–2	South Korea	Manila, Philippines
				Stadium: Rizal Memorial Stadium

21 April 1956 1956 AFC Asian Cup qualification	South Korea	3–0	Philippines	Seoul, South Korea

== 1954 ==
3 May 1954 1954 Asian Games	Philippines	2–3	South Vietnam	Manila, Philippines

6 May 1954 1954 Asian Games	Philippines	0–4	Taiwan	Manila, Philippines

== 1953 ==
31 January 1953 Unofficial friendly	Singapore	4–0	Philippines	Manila, Philippines

20 June 1953 Unofficial friendly	Singapore	3–1	Philippines	Singapore

== 1950 ==
19 February 1950 Unofficial friendly	Hong Kong	6–1	Philippines	British Hong Kong

== 1948 ==
21 February 1948 Unofficial friendly	Hong Kong	4–1	Philippines	British Hong Kong
