= Sri Lanka national football team results =

- Win Draw Loss

For Sri Lanka national football team results see:

- Sri Lanka national football team results (1949–1979)
- Sri Lanka national football team results (1980–2009)
- Sri Lanka national football team results (2010–present)
- Sri Lanka national football team results (unofficial matches)
