= Football at the 1964 Summer Olympics – Men's Asian Qualifiers – Group 2 =

The 1964 Summer Olympics football qualification – Asia Group 2 was one of the three Asian groups in the Summer Olympics football qualification tournament to decide which teams would qualify for the 1964 Summer Olympics football finals tournament in Japan. Group 2 consisted of five teams: Indonesia, Burma, Malaysia, North Korea and Thailand. The teams played home-and-away knockout matches. North Korea qualified for the Summer Olympics football finals after defeating Thailand 7–0 on aggregate in the second round.

== Summary ==
Team 1	Agg.	Team 2	1st leg	2nd leg
Preliminary round
Malaysia	3–4	Thailand	1–1	2–3
First round
Burma	0–1	North Korea	0–0	0–1
Thailand	w/o (Note: Indonesia withdrew.)	Indonesia	—	—
Second round
North Korea	7–0	Thailand	2–0	5–0

== Preliminary round ==
12 October 1963

Malaysia	1–1	Thailand
Gabrielle 24'	Report	Panich 79'

Stadium Merdeka, Kuala Lumpur
Referee: Fred Pratlett (Hong Kong)
16 November 1963

Thailand	3–2	Malaysia
Panikabutr 10'; Nilpirom 27', 59'	Report	Ambu 11'; Noordin 79'

Suphachalasai Stadium, Bangkok

Thailand won 4–3 on aggregate and advanced to the first round.

== First round ==
22 March 1963

Burma	0–0	North Korea
	Report

Bogyoke Aung San Stadium, Yangon
2 April 1963

North Korea	1–0	Burma
Pak Seung-zin (?)	Report

Girimri Stadium, Pyongyang

North Korea won 1–0 on aggregate and advanced to the second round.

Thailand	w/o	Indonesia
	Report

Indonesia	w/o	Thailand
	Report

Thailand won on walkover and advanced to the second round.

== Second round ==
31 May 1964

North Korea	2–0	Thailand
Pak Seung-zin 58'; Kong Si-hak 71'	Report

Bogyoke Aung San Stadium, Yangon
28 June 1964

Thailand	0–5	North Korea
	Report	Kim Seung-il 21'; Pak Doo-ik 24', 71', 76'; Pak Seung-zin 67'

Bogyoke Aung San Stadium, Yangon

North Korea won 7–0 on aggregate and qualified for the Summer Olympics.

== Goalscorers ==
There were 15 goals scored in 6 matches, for an average of 2.5 goals per match.

3 goals

- (North Korea national football team) Pak Seung-zin
- (North Korea national football team) Pak Doo-ik

2 goals

- (Thailand national football team) Yanyong Nilpirom

1 goal

- (Malaysia national football team) Stanley Gabrielle
- (Thailand national football team) Suphot Panich
- (Thailand national football team) Asdang Panikabutr
- (Malaysia national football team) Mahat Ambu
- (Malaysia national football team) Abdullah Yeop Noordin
- (North Korea national football team) Kong Si-hak
- (North Korea national football team) Kim Seung-il
