= Sri Lanka national football team results (unofficial matches) =

This is a list of the Sri Lanka national football team results, for various reasons, are not accorded the status of official International A Matches.

== 1930s ==
=== 1933 ===
31 January 1933 Friendly	Ceylon (British Ceylon)	0–1	(India) IFA XI	British Ceylon
		Report	Gostha Paul	Referee: Pankaj Gupta

=== 1935 ===
31 October 1935 Friendly	Ceylon (British Ceylon)	1–1	(India) Mohammedan Sporting	British Ceylon
	Chambers	Report	Rahmat

== 1940s ==
=== 1946 ===
3 January 1946 Friendly	Ceylon (British Ceylon)	2–2	India XI	Colombo, British Ceylon
	Reynolds; Sabreen	Report	Albert (o.g.); Narayan	Stadium: Government Services Ground; Referee: P. L. Pestonjee

=== 1948 ===
18 February 1948 Friendly	Ceylon	3–2	India XI	Ceylon
	Ghafoor (o.g.); Chelliah; Podiappuhamy	Report	Thomas; Ibrahim

=== 1949 ===
29 November 1949 Friendly	Ceylon	0–4	(Pakistan) Jinnah Gymkhana	Colombo, Ceylon
		Report	Kassim; Afzal	Stadium: Government Services Ground

2 December 1949 Friendly	Ceylon	0–1	(Pakistan) Jinnah Gymkhana	Colombo, Ceylon
		Report	Samshaud	Stadium: Parsons Road Ground

== 1950s ==
=== 1957 ===
1957 Friendly	Ceylon	1–16	(Soviet Union) Neftyanik	Colombo, Ceylon
		Report

1957 Friendly	Ceylon	2–14	(Soviet Union) Neftyanik	Colombo, Ceylon
		Report

1957 Friendly	Ceylon	1–2	(Soviet Union) Neftyanik	Colombo, Ceylon
		Report

=== 1958 ===
19 April 1958 Friendly	Kunming XI (China)	4–3	Ceylon	Kunming, China
		Report

23 April 1958 Friendly	Chongqing XI (China)	7–1	Ceylon	Chongqing, China
		Report

28 April 1958 Friendly	Beijing XI (China)	8–1	Ceylon	Beijing, China
		Report

30 April 1958 Friendly	Locomotive (China)	9–1	Ceylon	Beijing, China
		Report

8 May 1958 Friendly	Nanjing XI (China)	6–2	Ceylon	Nanjing, China
		Report

10 May 1958 Friendly	Shanghai Youth (China)	0–2	Ceylon	Shanghai, China
		Report

12 May 1958 Friendly	Red Flag (China)	6–1	Ceylon	Shanghai, China
		Report

== 1960s ==
=== 1960 ===
21 January 1960 Friendly	Ceylon	2–6	(Soviet Union) Zenit Leningrad	Colombo, Ceylon
		Report

24 January 1960 Friendly	Ceylon	0–5	(Soviet Union) Zenit Leningrad	Colombo, Ceylon
		Report

=== 1961 ===
2 January 1961 Friendly	Ceylon	0–7	(Soviet Union) Spartak Praha Sokolovo	Colombo, Ceylon
		Report

1 May 1961 Friendly	Ceylon	1–7	(Brazil) Madureira	Colombo, Ceylon
	Aluvihare	Report	Fernando; Azumir; Odir; Nelson; Batata

3 May 1961 Friendly	Ceylon	2–13	(Brazil) Madureira	Colombo, Ceylon
		Report

7 May 1961 Friendly	Ceylon	1–11	(Brazil) Madureira	Colombo, Ceylon
		Report

1961 Southern Pentangular Tournament	Ceylon	3–1	(India) Madras FA	Bangalore, India
		Report

1961 Southern Pentangular Tournament	Ceylon	N/A	(India) Kerala FA	Bangalore, India
		Report

1961 Southern Pentangular Tournament	Ceylon	N/A	(India) Andhra Pradesh FA	Bangalore, India
		Report

1961 Southern Pentangular Tournament	Ceylon	N/A	(India) Mysore FA	Bangalore, India
		Report

=== 1962 ===
1962 Southern Pentangular Tournament	Ceylon	N/A	(India) Madras FA	Madras, India
		Report

1962 Southern Pentangular Tournament	Ceylon	N/A	(India) Kerala FA	Madras, India
		Report

1962 Southern Pentangular Tournament	Ceylon	N/A	(India) Andhra Pradesh FA	Madras, India
		Report

1962 Southern Pentangular Tournament	Ceylon	N/A	(India) Mysore FA	Madras, India
		Report

=== 1963 ===
1963 Southern Pentangular Tournament	Ceylon	5–2	(India) Kerala FA	Colombo, Ceylon
		Report

1963 Southern Pentangular Tournament	Ceylon	1–1	(India) Andhra Pradesh FA	Colombo, Ceylon
		Report

1963 Southern Pentangular Tournament	Ceylon	N/A	(India) Madras FA	Colombo, Ceylon
		Report

1963 Southern Pentangular Tournament	Ceylon	N/A	(India) Mysore FA	Colombo, Ceylon
		Report

=== 1964 ===
1964 Friendly	Ceylon	N/A	(Switzerland) FC Red Star Zürich
		Report

1964 Southern Pentangular Tournament	Ceylon	2–1	(India) Kerala FA	Andhra Pradesh, India
		Report

1964 Southern Pentangular Tournament	Ceylon	N/A	(India) Madras FA	Andhra Pradesh, India
		Report

1964 Southern Pentangular Tournament	Ceylon	N/A	(India) Andhra Pradesh FA	Andhra Pradesh, India
		Report

1964 Southern Pentangular Tournament	Ceylon	N/A	(India) Mysore FA	Andhra Pradesh, India
		Report

=== 1965 ===
13 June 1965 Friendly	Ceylon	0–6	(West Germany) 1. FC Nürnberg	Colombo, Ceylon
		Report

16 June 1965 Friendly	Ceylon	0–11	(West Germany) 1. FC Nürnberg	Colombo, Ceylon
		Report

=== 1967 ===
1967 Southern Pentangular Tournament	Ceylon	3–0	(India) Kerala FA	Colombo, Ceylon
		Report

1967 Southern Pentangular Tournament	Ceylon	3–0	(India) Madras FA	Colombo, Ceylon
		Report

1967 Southern Pentangular Tournament	Ceylon	0–1	(India) Mysore FA	Colombo, Ceylon
		Report

1967 Southern Pentangular Tournament	Ceylon	N/A	(India) Andhra Pradesh FA	Colombo, Ceylon
		Report

22 November 1967 Friendly	Ceylon	2–1	(United States) Dallas Tornado	Colombo, Ceylon
	Noor; Zainulabdeen	Report	Chris Tonning

24 November 1967 Friendly	Ceylon	3–0	(United States) Dallas Tornado	Colombo, Ceylon
	Hassimdeen; Zainulabdeen; Noor	Report

6 December 1967 Friendly	Ceylon	2–5	(Soviet Union) FK Žalgiris	Colombo, Ceylon

=== 1968 ===
1968 Friendly	Maccabi (Israel)	1–3	Ceylon	Israel
		Report

1968 Friendly	VfR Übach-Palenberg (West Germany)	1–1	Ceylon	West Germany
		Report

1968 Friendly	Essen District (West Germany)	1–3	Ceylon	West Germany
		Report

1968 Friendly	Hamburg (West Germany)	3–0	Ceylon	West Germany
		Report

== 1970s ==
=== 1970 ===
1970 Southern Quadrangular Tournament	Ceylon	5–1	(India) Madras FA	Colombo, Ceylon
		Report

1970 Southern Quadrangular Tournament	Ceylon	3–1	(India) Kerala FA	Colombo, Ceylon
		Report

1970 Southern Quadrangular Tournament	Ceylon	1–0	(India) Mysore FA	Colombo, Ceylon
		Report

1970 Southern Quadrangular Tournament	Ceylon	5–0	(India) Madras FA	Colombo, Ceylon
		Report

1970 Southern Quadrangular Tournament	Ceylon	5–0	(India) Kerala FA	Colombo, Ceylon
		Report

1970 Southern Quadrangular Tournament	Ceylon	3–1	(India) Mysore FA	Colombo, Ceylon
		Report

=== 1972 ===
18 July 1972 Merdeka Tournament	Burma B (Myanmar)	5–2	Sri Lanka	Malaysia, Kuala Lumpur
		Report		Stadium: Merdeka Stadium

29 November 1972 Friendly	Sri Lanka	0–7	(Soviet Union) Dinamo Tbilisi	Colombo, Ceylon
		Report

2 December 1972 Friendly	Sri Lanka	0–4	(Soviet Union) Dinamo Tbilisi	Colombo, Ceylon
		Report

=== 1979 ===
9 November 1979 Friendly	Sri Lanka	1–1	(Sweden) Kronängs IF	Colombo, Ceylon
		Report

24 November 1979 1979 King's Cup	South Korea B	5–0	Sri Lanka	Bangkok, Thailand
		Report

26 November 1979 1979 King's Cup	Indonesia XI	N/A	Sri Lanka	Bangkok, Thailand
		Report

== 1980s ==
=== 1986 ===
18 April 1986 1986 Quaid-e-Azam International Tournament	Pakistan Whites	2–3	Sri Lanka	Islamabad, Pakistan
		Report		Stadium: Jinnah Sports Stadium

30 April 1986 1986 Quaid-e-Azam International Tournament	South Korea Works Selection	4–0	Sri Lanka	Islamabad, Pakistan
		Report		Stadium: Jinnah Sports Stadium

5 May 1986 Friendly	Habib Bank (Pakistan)	1–1	Sri Lanka	Multan, Pakistan
	Ejaz Karra		Unknown	Stadium: Ibn-e-Qasim Bagh Stadium

== 1990s ==
=== 1993 ===
22 July 1993 1993 SAARC Gold Cup	Pakistan Whites	1–2	Sri Lanka	Lahore, Pakistan
	Athar (?)	Report	Silva (?); Perera (?)	Stadium: Railway Stadium

=== 1995 ===
27 October 1995 Burma Tournament 1995	Singapore AFSA	1–0	Sri Lanka	Yangon, Burma
	Razuldin Yacob 30'	Report		Stadium: Thuwunna Stadium

=== 1998 ===
17 November 1998 Bristol Freedom Cup	Sri Lanka	2–1	Malaysia Olympic	Colombo, Sri Lanka
		Report

19 November 1998 Bristol Freedom Cup	Sri Lanka	1–1	India B	Colombo, Sri Lanka
		Report

21 November 1998 Bristol Freedom Cup	Sri Lanka	2–3 (a.e.t.)	India B	Colombo, Sri Lanka
		Report

== 2000s ==
=== 2000 ===
27 August 2000 Ho Chi Minh City Cup	Yunnan Hongta (China)	2–1	Sri Lanka	Ho Chi Minh City, Vietnam
		Report

30 October 2000 Friendly	Singapore U23	2–0	Sri Lanka	Singapore
		Report

=== 2009 ===
5 March 2009 2009 ANFA Cup	Nepal Blue	2–3	Sri Lanka	Kathmandu, Nepal
	Santosh Sahukhala 7'; Santosh Nepali 73'	Report	E.B Channa 25'; Chathura Gunaratne 28'; Chatura Madhuranga 65'

9 March 2009 2009 ANFA Cup	Sri Lanka	0–0	(Thailand) JW GROUP	Kathmandu, Nepal
		Report

12 March 2009 2009 ANFA Cup	Sri Lanka	4–0	(Bangladesh) Arambagh KS	Kathmandu, Nepal
		Report

== 2010s ==
=== 2015 ===
29 January 2015 Bangabandhu Cup	Malaysia U22	2–0	Sri Lanka	Sylhet District Stadium, Sylhet
17:00 UTC+6	Syahrul (45+4 p ) Ridzuan 60'			Attendance: 7,000

=== 2016 ===
15 January 2015 Bangabandhu Cup	Felda United (Malaysia)	1–2	Sri Lanka	Dhaka
14:45 UTC+6	Alias 82'		Nipuna 19'; Sanjeewa 63'	Stadium: Bangabandhu Stadium; Attendance: 300

=== 2018 ===
The Lithuanian team was a B team. A second match in 11 July ending in 0–2 defeat was played by Sri Lanka B.

8 July 2018 Friendly	Sri Lanka	0–0	Lithuania B	Colombo, Sri Lanka
		Report		Stadium: Colombo Racecourse

== 2020s ==
=== 2022 ===
The international friendly match against Nepal was played behind closed doors at the Grand Hamad Stadium.

31 May 2022 International Friendly	Sri Lanka	1–1	Nepal	Doha, Qatar
	Mariyathas	Report	Shrestha	Stadium: Grand Hamad Stadium

=== 2026 ===
2 October 2026 International Friendly	Mauritius	3–0	Sri Lanka	Saint Pierre, Mauritius
19:00 UTC+4	De Robillard 28' (pen.); W. François 33'; A. François 59'	Report		Stadium: Côte d'Or National Sports Complex
