= Football at the 1964 Summer Olympics – Men's Asian Qualifiers – Group 3 =

The 1964 Summer Olympics football qualification – Asia Group 3 was one of the three Asian groups in the Summer Olympics football qualification tournament to decide which teams would qualify for the 1964 Summer Olympics football finals tournament in Japan. Group 3 consisted of six teams: Ceylon, India, Iran, Iraq, Lebanon and Pakistan. The teams played home-and-away knockout matches. Iran qualified for the Summer Olympics football finals after defeating India 6–1 on aggregate in the second round.

== Summary ==
Team 1	Agg.	Team 2	1st leg	2nd leg
Preliminary round
Iran	4–2	Pakistan	4–1	0–1
Ceylon	3–12	India	3–5	0–7
First round
Iran	4–0	Iraq	4–0	0–0
India	w/o (Note: Lebanon withdrew.)	Lebanon	—	—
Second round
Iran	6–1	India	3–0	3–1

== Preliminary round ==
4 October 1963

Iran	4–1	Pakistan
Shahrokhi 20'; Shirzadegan 23' (pen.); Behzadi 65', 70'	Report; Report	Abbas 14'

Amjadieh Stadium, Tehran
Attendance: 25,000
Referee: Khachator Hakat (Lebanon)
3 November 1963

Pakistan	1–0	Iran
Jehangir 70'	Report

Lahore Stadium, Lahore
Attendance: 15,000
Referee: Liknakamik (Thailand)

Iran won 4–2 on aggregate and advanced to the first round.

27 November 1963

Ceylon	3–5	India
Mahinda 16', 89'; Sirisena 47'	Report	Appalaraju 11', 36', 78'; Y. Khan 56', 58'

Sugathadasa Stadium, Colombo
Attendance: 30,000
Referee: H.A.B. Mansoor (Malaysia)
7 December 1963

India	7–0	Ceylon
Samajpati 6'; Appalaraju 11', 75', 85'; I. Singh 27'; S. Khan 49', 80'	Report

Sree Kanteerava Stadium, Bangalore
Attendance: 30,000
Referee: U Kyin Maung Aye (Burma)

India won 12–3 on aggregate and advanced to the first round.

== First round ==
13 December 1963

Iran	4–0	Iraq
Shirzadegan (?); Shahrokhi (?); Arab (?); Barmaki (?)	Report

Amjadieh Stadium, Tehran
Attendance: 25,000
Referee: Jerome Pascoal D'Mello (India)
3 January 1964

Iraq	0–0	Iran
	Report

Al-Kashafa Stadium, Baghdad
Attendance: 20,000
Referee: Jerome Pascoal D'Mello (India)

Iran won 4–0 on aggregate and advanced to the second round.

India	w/o	Lebanon
	Report

Lebanon	w/o	India
	Report

India won on walkover and advanced to the second round.

== Second round ==
7 June 1964

Iran	3–0	India
Barmaki (?); Shirzadegan (?); Behzadi (?)	Report

Amjadieh Stadium, Tehran
Attendance: 30,000
Referee: Qimaqchi (Iraq)
28 June 1964

India	1–3	Iran
Goswami 10'	Report	Barmaki 4'; Shirzadegan 10'; Behzadi 88'

Rabindra Sarobar Stadium, Calcutta
Attendance: 25,000
Referee: Yohan Mint (Burma)

Iran won 6–1 on aggregate and qualified for the Summer Olympics.

== Goalscorers ==
There were 32 goals scored in 8 matches, for an average of 4 goals per match.

6 goals

- (India national football team) K. Appalaraju

4 goals

- (Iran national football team) Hamid Shirzadegan
- (Iran national football team) Homayoun Behzadi

3 goals

- (Iran national football team) Hamid Barmaki

2 goals

- (India national football team) Yousuf Khan
- (Sri Lanka national football team) Mahinda Aluvihare
- (India national football team) Sarmad Khan
- (Iran national football team) Mehrab Shahrokhi

1 goal

- (Pakistan national football team) Ghulam Abbas Baloch
- (Pakistan national football team) Jehangir Khan
- (Sri Lanka national football team) Pathiniya Durage Sirisena
- (India national football team) Sukumar Samajpati
- (India national football team) Inder Singh
- (Iran national football team) Mostafa Arab
- (India national football team) Subimal Goswami
