= Football at the 1964 Summer Olympics – Men's Asian Qualifiers – Group 1 =

The 1964 Summer Olympics football qualification – Asia Group 1 was one of the three Asian groups in the Summer Olympics football qualification tournament to decide which teams would qualify for the 1964 Summer Olympics football finals tournament in Japan. Group 1 consisted of five teams: Israel, Philippines, South Korea, South Vietnam and Taiwan. The teams played home-and-away knockout matches. South Korea qualified for the Summer Olympics football finals after defeating South Vietnam 5–2 on aggregate in the second round.

== Summary ==
Team 1	Agg.	Team 2	1st leg	2nd leg
Preliminary round
South Korea	2–2	Taiwan	2–1	0–1
Preliminary round play-off
South Korea	w/o (Note: The play-off was awarded to South Korea, as Taiwan were disqualified due to objecting to playing at a neutral venue and refused to travel.)	Taiwan		
First round
South Korea	w/o (Note: Philippines withdrew.)	Philippines	—	—
South Vietnam	2–1	Israel	0–1	2–0
Second round
South Korea	5–2	South Vietnam	3–0	2–2

== Preliminary round ==
28 November 1963

South Korea	2–1	Taiwan
Cho Yoon-ok 48', 73'	Report	Cho Nam-soo 6' (o.g.)

Hyochang Stadium, Seoul
Attendance: 20,000
8 December 1963

Taiwan	1–0	South Korea
Wong Man-wai 49'	Report

Taipei Municipal Stadium, Taipei

South Korea and Taiwan tied 2–2 on aggregate and advanced to a play-off.

=== Play-off ===
South Korea	w/o	Taiwan
	Report

South Korea won on walkover and advanced to the first round.

== First round ==
South Korea	w/o	Philippines
	Report

Philippines	w/o	South Korea
	Report

South Korea won on walkover and advanced to the second round.

28 December 1963

South Vietnam	0–1	Israel
	Report	Young 20'

Republic Stadium, Saigon
Attendance: 25,000
Referee: Greg da Silva (Malaysia)
17 March 1964

Israel	0–2	South Vietnam
	Report	Văn Quảng 27'; Văn Ngôn 41'

Ramat Gan Stadium, Ramat Gan
Attendance: 36,937
Referee: Hakkı Gürüz (Turkey)

South Vietnam won 2–1 on aggregate and advanced to the second round.

== Second round ==
31 May 1964

South Korea	3–0	South Vietnam
Cho Sung-dal 9'; Lee Yi-woo 79'; Cho Yoon-ok 82' (pen.)	Report

Hyochang Stadium, Seoul
Attendance: 20,000
28 June 1964

South Vietnam	2–2	South Korea
Văn Quảng 29', 70'	Report	Lee Yi-woo 17', 39'

Republic Stadium, Saigon
Attendance: 30,000

South Korea won 5–2 on aggregate and qualified for the Summer Olympics.

== Goalscorers ==
There were 14 goals scored in 6 matches, for an average of 2.33 goals per match.

3 goals

- (South Korea national football team) Cho Yoon-ok
- (South Korea national football team) Lee Yi-woo
- (South Vietnam national football team) Nguyễn Văn Quảng

1 goal

- (Chinese Taipei national football team) Wong Man-wai
- (Israel national football team) Roby Young
- (South Vietnam national football team) Nguyễn Văn Ngôn
- (South Korea national football team) Cho Sung-dal

1 own goal

- (Chinese Taipei national football team) Cho Nam-soo
