= Kim Sung-il =

- Hangul: 김성일
- RR: Gim Seongil
- MR: Kim Sŏngil

Kim Sung-il (김성일) may refer to:

- Kim Sŏngil (born 1538) (1538–1593), Joseon Dynasty politician
- Kim Sung-il (general) (born 1948)
- Kim Sung-il (footballer) (born 1973)
- Kim Seoung-il (born 1990), South Korean short track speed skater
- Kim Song-il (North Korean politician)
- Kim Song-il (gymnast), North Korean gymnast
- Sung-il Kim (born 1974), South Korean writer of science fiction, fantasy, and horror

== See also ==
- Kim Il Sung (1912–1994), North Korean leader and revolutionary
- Kim Seung-il (disambiguation) (김승일)
