= Mahinda Aluvihare =

Sri Lankan footballer

- Mahinda at the national team photoshoot

Personal information
- Full name: Mahinda Aluvihare
- Place of birth: Kandy, British Ceylon (present-day Sri Lanka)
- Place of death: Kandy, Sri Lanka
- Position: Midfielder

Youth career
- St. Sylvester's College

Senior career*
Years	Team	Apps	(Gls)
- Young Wanders SC
1961–1968	Royal Ceylon Air Force		

International career
1961	Ceylon U19		
1961–1968	Ceylon		
- * Club domestic league appearances and goals

Mahinda Aluvihare (Sinhala: මහින්ද අලුවිහාර) was a Sri Lankan football player who played primarily as a central midfielder and could also be deployed as a wide midfielder. He was also the captain of the Ceylon national team.

== Early life ==
Mahinda Aluvihare, an alumnus of St. Sylvester's College, in Kandy, excelled in multiple sports including football, basketball, athletics, field hockey, and boxing. He captained his school's football and basketball teams and competed as a sprinter in short-distance events at the Central Province Group meet. Aluvihare participated in numerous inter-school football tournaments with Combined School XI. His brother, Ratnapala Aluvihare, was also a national footballer.

== Club career ==
Mahinda joined the Royal Ceylon Air Force in 1961 and began representing its football team in various tournaments. Prior to that, he plied his trade with different Kandy-based clubs, including Young Wanders Sports Club. Mahinda led Ceylon Air Force to become the inter-service football champions in 1966, a title they had won for ten consecutive years. Mahinda, known for his long-range free kicks, led numerous clubs from Kandy to gain the upper hand over star-studded teams from Colombo in inter-club competitions. At domestic level, he played mainly as a central midfielder, in contrast to his more attacking role in the national team.

== International career ==
His first international tour came with the Ceylon U19 team at the 1961 AFC Youth Championship held in Thailand. In the same year, Mahinda played for the Ceylon national team beside his brother Ratnapala Aluvihare at the first Southern Football Pentangular Tournament in Bangalore under the captaincy of C.S. Fernando.

He scored a notable goal against India at the 1964 Summer Olympics qualifiers held in Sugathadasa Stadium, Colombo. He beat Indian goalkeeper, Peter Thangaraj, with a "40 yards powerful drive which broke the goal net", as Ceylon eventually lost 3–5.

On 28 February 1965, Mahinda was instrumental in Ceylon's first international victory on home soil, defeating Pakistan 3–1 in Colombo. The team under the captaincy of M.M. Hassimdeen, was considered to be one of the best in the country's football history. In 1968, he was part of the Ceylon Colts team that finished runners-up at the Aga Khan Gold Cup held in Dhaka, East Pakistan (now Bangladesh). The team captained by A. Zainulabdeen, lost the final 0–5 to Dhaka Mohammedan.

Mahinda captained Ceylon when they hosted the Southern Pentangular tournament in 1967. They finished runners-up in the tournament, losing 0–1 to Mysore football team. He was again appointed captain of the national team during their European tour in 1968. The team also included the likes of Muzammil Hassimdeen, Subhani Hassimdeen, Lionel Peiris and P.D. Sirisena, to name a few. He also featured in the 1968 Summer Olympics qualifiers over two legs against Israel.

== Post–playing career ==
After leaving the Royal Ceylon Air Force, he joined the Bank of Ceylon and significantly contributed to Kandy football and his former school. He was actively involved with the St. Sylvester's College Old Boys’ Association, where he once served as secretary.

== Career statistics ==
=== International goals ===
List of international goals scored by Mahinda Aluvihare
No.	Date	Venue	Opponent	Score	Result	Competition	Ref.
1	27 November 1963	Sugathadasa Stadium, Colombo, Ceylon	India	1–1	3–5	1964 Summer Olympics qualifiers	
2	27 November 1963	Sugathadasa Stadium, Colombo, Ceylon	India	3–5	3–5	1964 Summer Olympics qualifiers	
