= Roby Young =

Israeli footballer (born 1942)

Roby Young רובי יאנג
Personal information
- Full name: Reuven Young ראובן יאנג
- Date of birth: 15 May 1942 (age 84)
- Place of birth: Haifa, Israel
- Height: 1.70 m (5 ft 7 in)
- Position: Wing back

Senior career*
| Years | Team | Apps | (Gls) |
| 1959–1976 | Hapoel Haifa | 196 | (43) |
| 1972–1973 | → New York Cosmos (loan) | 18 | (2) |
| Total | | 214 | (45) |

International career
| 1961–1969 | Israel | 50 | (8) |
- * Club domestic league appearances and goals

Reuven "Roby" Young (Hebrew: רובי יאנג; born 15 May 1942) is an Israeli former international footballer, and captain of Hapoel Haifa.

== Early life ==
Born on 15 May 1942 in Haifa, Israel, Roby Young was raised (alongside his older brother) by his mother in a small one-bedroom apartment in a quaint beach-side neighborhood called Bat Galim (translated: Daughter of the Waves). Grounded by his poor and humble beginnings, where his mother worked multiple jobs.

== Career ==
Forced to quit school as a young teenager to earn wages at an oil factory, Young was first discovered playing soccer at age 15 for factory's team in an industrial league. His raw power and speed at such a young age attracted a scout from nearby professional club, Hapoel Haifa, who brought Young into their youth program. Young's impact on the youth program was immediate, as his team did not lose a single match and won the youth National Championship in Israel. By age 16, Young was promoted to the senior professional team and made his professional debut at age 16. Young remained loyal to Hapoel Haifa for his entire career in Israel, where he led his Hapoel Haifa team for over a decade and won two National Cups.

As a teenager, Young was invited to play for the Israeli National Soccer Team at age 17. As a left winger, Young was a mainstay on the National Team for 12 years, and became the first Captain of the Israeli national team from Haifa.

As Captain of the Israeli National Soccer Team during its golden age, Young paced the Israeli team to its best-ever finish in the 1968 Olympics in Mexico City (where he was the flag bearer for Israel), and led Israel to qualify for the FIFA World Cup (held in Mexico City in 1970). Young and his Israeli team are also the unlucky answers to a soccer trivia question: which is the LAST team to lose a World Cup or Olympics playoff game by "choosing lots" before FIFA changed the rules to introduce penalty kicks to decide games. In the 1968 Olympics, the Israeli soccer team Israeli National Soccer Team qualified for the quarter-finals from Group C 1968 Olympic Games. Israel faced Bulgaria and played them to a 1–1 draw after regulation and overtime. With no Penalty Kicks rule in place, the game would be decided by drawing names out of a hat—with Young, as Captain of the Israeli team, at midfield with the Bulgarian Captain (Dimitrov) and the officials. Israel was unlucky to lose that game, as Bulgaria prevailed and took home the silver medal.

Young became a household name in Israel when, on 15 October 1961, at age 19, he scored a brilliant goal against powerhouse Italy in a 1962 World Cup Qualifier to give Israel a 2–0 lead. While Israel went on to lose 4–2, the goal, in which he dribbled past Italy captain Cesare Maldini (father of Paolo Maldini) and blasted a long-range shot past Italy legend Lorenzo Buffon (uncle of Gigi Buffon), helping put Israel on the soccer map. This goal (and Young himself) captured the hearts and imaginations of Israelis young and old. Young later captained Israel to its Asia Cup title in 1964. Young also captained the team against a mighty England squad that would later win the 1966 World Cup. Young's Israeli squad eventually qualified for the 1970 World Cup (its only appearance to date) and tied Italy and Sweden but lost to Uruguay in the group stage. At the time of his retirement from international soccer, Young was the most capped player to play for Israel, earning 50 caps from age 18–27, after which he moved his family to the United States to play for the famed New York Cosmos.

Young was named soccer "Player of the Millennium" in Haifa, Israel in 2001.

== International goals ==
| No. | Date | Venue | Opponent | Score | Result | Competition |
|---|---|---|---|---|---|---|
| 1. | 15 October 1961 | Ramat Gan, Israel | Italy | 2–0 | 2–4 | 1962 FIFA World Cup qualification |
| 2. | 29 December 1963 | Saigon, South Vietnam | South Vietnam | 1–0 | 1–0 | 1964 Summer Olympics qualifiers |
| 3. | 6 April 1964 | Tel Aviv, Israel | Finland | 5–1 | 7–1 | Friendly |
| 4. | 8 May 1964 | Helsinki, Finland | Finland | 1–0 | 3–0 | Friendly |
| 5. | 19 October 1964 | Leeuwarden, Netherlands | Netherlands | 1–3 | 1–4 | Friendly |
| 6. | 19 February 1969 | Tel Aviv, Israel | Sweden | 2–0 | 2–3 | Friendly |
| 7. | 12 March 1969 | Tel Aviv, Israel | Greece | 1–1 | 3–3 | Friendly |
| 8. | 28 May 1969 | Athens, Greece | Greece | 2–1 | 3–1 | Friendly |

== United States ==
After retiring from international soccer and leaving Hapoel Haifa, Young enrolled at Adelphi University in the United States where he received his Bachelor of Science degree and Masters in Health Education. Young led his Adelphi soccer team to a 10-2-3 record (after a 5-10-1 record the year before his arrival), and was inducted into the Adelphi Sports Hall of Fame in 2000. Upon his arrival in the United States, Young was signed by the historic New York Cosmos soccer team in the North American Soccer League (NASL), where his team won the 1972 NASL Championship and were semi-finalists in 1973. Roby played left wing for the Cosmos and was a pivotal member of the championship squad. Young's coach with the New York Cosmos, Gordon Bradley, would later coach Young's middle son, Irad Young, at George Mason University, where Irad was an All-South and honorable All-American soccer player. Young retired from professional soccer at age 31 in 1973, after which he returned to Israel for several years to coach professionally at Macabbi Tel Aviv and Hapoel Haifa.

== Later life ==
From 1969 until 2013, (except for several years coaching professional soccer in Israel), Young worked as an athletic director at Buckley Country Day School in Roslyn, New York. He also coached the Queen's College men's soccer team from 1986 to 1989 and the women's football (soccer) team at Queens College from 1999 to 2008. He was the athletic director at Buckley Country Day School and co-founded the Buckley Summer Camp in 1984. He retired from Buckley in 2013 but is still an active teacher in their chess program.

== See also ==
- List of Queens College people
