= Jehangir Khan =

Pakistani former footballer

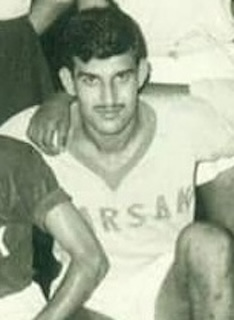
- Khan with Warsak football team in 1963

Personal information
- Full name: Jehangir Khan
- Place of birth: Peshawar, British India

Senior career*
Years	Team	Apps	(Gls)
1960s	Warsak FC		

International career
1963	Pakistan	1	(1)
- * Club domestic league appearances and goals

Jehangir Khan (Pashto, Urdu: جهانګير خان) was a Pakistani footballer who played as a forward. He represented the Pakistan national team in 1963.

== Early life ==
Khan was born in Peshawar, British India.

== Club career ==
Khan was a part of Warsak FC in the 1960s, and also represented Peshawar Division at the National Football Championship.

In 1963, Khan contributed to Warsak's triumph at the 1963 All-Pakistan Sheikh Mohammad Ismail Gold Shield Football Tournament. The same year, he was also present with the team for the 1963 Aga Khan Gold Cup. The following year, he once again helped his team to win the Ismail Gold Shield again, by scoring a brace in the final. At the 1964 Aga Khan Gold Cup, he helped Warsak win the qualifying stage by scoring in all two matches against PWD and East-West Pak Union SC, however the team failed to get past the group stage. At the 1968 Aga Khan Gold Cup, he scored a brace in a surprise victory against Dhaka Wanderers, but the team fell against Pakistan Airlines in the qualifying stage.

== International career ==
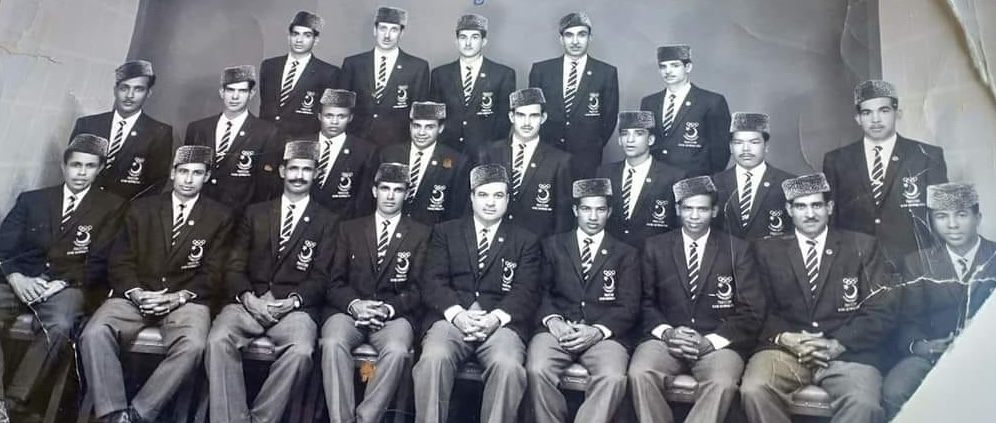
Khan in middle row fifth from left with Pakistan national squad for the 1964 Summer Olympics qualifiers

In 1963, Khan was selected to represent the Pakistan national football team for the 1964 Olympic Qualifiers, where he scored the winning goal against Iran in the second leg of the preliminary round at the 70th minute in a 1–0 victory.

== Post-retirement ==
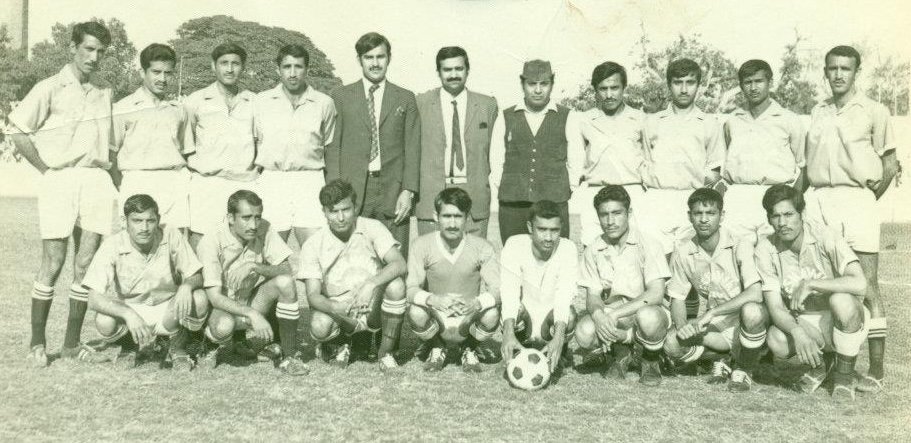
Khan (fifth from left, standing row) with the Peshawar Division football team in 1973.

After retiring, Khan coached the Peshawar Division at the 1973 National Football Championship.

== Career statistics ==
=== International goals ===
Scores and results list Pakistan's goal tally first, score column indicates score after each Jehangir goal.

List of international goals scored by Jehangir Khan
No.	Date	Venue	Opponent	Score	Result	Competition	Ref.
1	3 November 1963	Lahore Stadium, Lahore, Pakistan	Iran	1–0	1–0	1964 Summer Olympics qualification	
