= 1971 Merdeka Tournament =

Tournament details
- Host country: Malaysia
- Dates: 4–21 August
- Teams: 12

Final positions
- Champions: Burma (3rd title)
- Runners-up: Indonesia
- Third place: South Korea
- Fourth place: Taiwan

Tournament statistics
- Matches played: 37
- Goals scored: 126 (3.41 per match)

The 1971 Merdeka Tournament (Malay: 1971 Pestabola Merdeka) was the 15th invitational international association football championship held to commemorate the independence of Malaysia. Hosted by Malaysia, the competition ran from 4 to 21 August 1971 and was contested by the national teams of Burma, Hong Kong, India, Indonesia, Japan, Malaysia, the Philippines, Singapore, South Korea, South Vietnam, Taiwan and Thailand.

After two rounds of play, Burma were crowned champions of the competition after defeating Indonesia 1–0 in the final. In the third-place play-off, South Korea defeated Taiwan 2–0.

== Background ==
The Merdeka Tournament was founded in 1957 as a means to celebrate Independence Day in Malaya. It is the oldest invitational international association football tournament in Asia. South Korea were the defending champions after defeating Burma in the final of the previous edition in 1970. South Korea were also the most successful team in the history of the competition having won the title on four occasions.

== Format ==
In total, 12 teams took part in the competition. They were drawn into two single round robin groups of six teams. The group winners and runners-up would then contest the semi-finals which would decide the teams contesting the final and third-place play-off. Placement matches were also held for the teams finishing third, fourth, fifth and sixth in the group stage.

=== Participants ===
- Burma
- Hong Kong
- India
- Indonesia
- Japan
- Malaysia
- Philippines
- Singapore
- South Korea
- South Vietnam
- Taiwan
- Thailand

== Group stage ==
=== Group A ===
South Korea and Taiwan advanced to the semi-finals. Malaysia, South Vietnam, Japan and Thailand advanced to the placement matches.

==== Table ====
Team	Pld	W	D	L	GF	GA	GD	Pts
South Korea	5	4	0	1	9	1	+8	8
Taiwan	5	3	1	1	8	4	+4	7
Malaysia	5	2	1	2	6	4	+2	5
South Vietnam	5	2	0	3	8	8	0	4
Japan	5	2	0	3	6	11	–5	4
Thailand	5	1	0	4	6	15	–9	2

==== Matches ====
4 August 1971

Japan	3–2	Thailand

Merdeka Stadium, Kuala Lumpur
4 August 1971

Malaysia	2–0	South Vietnam
Zawawi 28'; Unknown 74' (o.g.)

Merdeka Stadium, Kuala Lumpur

6 August 1971

Japan	0–2	South Vietnam

Merdeka Stadium, Kuala Lumpur
6 August 1971

Malaysia	0–0	Taiwan

Merdeka Stadium, Kuala Lumpur
Referee: Tengku Ulung Yahaya
6 August 1971

South Korea	4–0	Thailand

Sultan Muhammad Stadium, Kota Bharu

8 August 1971

Taiwan	4–0	Thailand
Tsang Keng Hong 20'; Chan Chiu Ki 28'; Cheung Chi Doy 75'; Cheung Tze Wai 80'

Merdeka Stadium, Kuala Lumpur
8 August 1971

South Korea	3–0	Japan

Merdeka Stadium, Kuala Lumpur

10 August 1971

South Korea	0–1	Taiwan

Perak Stadium, Perak

12 August 1971

Taiwan	3–2	South Vietnam

Merdeka Stadium, Kuala Lumpur
12 August 1971

Malaysia	0–1	South Korea
		Kang Chong-tae 86'

Merdeka Stadium, Kuala Lumpur

14 August 1971

South Korea	1–0	South Vietnam

Merdeka Stadium, Kuala Lumpur
14 August 1971

Malaysia	0–2	Thailand
		Jaroongsak 57'; Songthai Sahavatcharin 85'

Merdeka Stadium, Kuala Lumpur
Attendance: 1,000

15 August 1971

Japan	2–0	Taiwan

Perak Stadium, Perak

11 August 1971

Malaysia	4–1	Japan

Perak Stadium, Perak

August 1971

Japan	0–2	South Vietnam

Merdeka Stadium, Kuala Lumpur

11 August 1971

South Vietnam	4–2	Thailand

Merdeka Stadium, Kuala Lumpur

14 August 1971

Japan	3–2	Taiwan

Merdeka Stadium, Kuala Lumpur

=== Group B ===
Indonesia and Burma advanced to the semi-finals. Singapore, Hong Kong, India and the Philippines advanced to the placement matches.

==== Table ====
Team	Pld	W	D	L	GF	GA	GD	Pts
Indonesia	5	4	1	0	15	4	+11	9
Burma	5	3	1	1	17	4	+13	7
Singapore	5	2	2	1	9	11	–2	6
Hong Kong	5	2	0	3	5	11	–6	4
India	5	1	1	3	10	17	–7	3
Philippines	5	0	1	4	7	16	–9	1

==== Matches ====
5 August 1971

India	5–1	Philippines
S. Bhowmick 17', 50', 62'; Mohammed Habib 38'; Shyam Thapa 42'		Thomas Lozano 80'

Merdeka Stadium, Kuala Lumpur
5 August 1971

Singapore	2–1	Hong Kong

Merdeka Stadium, Kuala Lumpur

7 August 1971

Burma	0–1	Singapore

Merdeka Stadium, Kuala Lumpur
7 August 1971

India	1–3	Indonesia

Merdeka Stadium, Kuala Lumpur

9 August 1971

Hong Kong	2–1	Philippines
Tang Hung Cheong 39'; Lo Hung Hoi 80'		Martínez 61'

Merdeka Stadium, Kuala Lumpur
Attendance: 12,000
9 August 1971

Indonesia	2–2	Burma

Merdeka Stadium, Kuala Lumpur

10 August 1971

India	2–2	Singapore

Merdeka Stadium, Kuala Lumpur

11 August 1971

Indonesia	3–1	Philippines

Merdeka Stadium, Kuala Lumpur
11 August 1971

Burma	4–0	Hong Kong

Merdeka Stadium, Kuala Lumpur

13 August 1971

Indonesia	4–0	Singapore

Perak Stadium, Perak
13 August 1971

Burma	2–0	Philippines

Sultan Ismail Nasiruddin Shah Stadium, Trengganu
13 August 1971

India	1–2	Hong Kong

Perak Stadium, Perak

15 August 1971

Singapore	4–4	Philippines
Quah Kim Lye 16'; Dollah 40'; Krishnan 56'; Ali 71'		Cuena 47'; Lozano 52' (pen.), 54'; Martínez 61'

Merdeka Stadium, Kuala Lumpur
15 August 1971

India	1–9	Burma

Merdeka Stadium, Kuala Lumpur
15 August 1971

Indonesia	3–0	Hong Kong

Perak Stadium, Perak

== 11th-place play-off ==
The Philippines defeated Thailand to finish 11th.

17 August 1971

Philippines	3–1	Thailand
Martínez 16', 75'; Crame 70'		Unknown 36' (o.g.)

Merdeka Stadium, Kuala Lumpur

== Ninth-place play-off ==
Japan defeated India to finish ninth.

18 August 1971

Japan	1–0	India

Merdeka Stadium, Kuala Lumpur

== Seventh-place play-off ==
South Vietnam defeated Hong Kong to finish seventh.

21 August 1971

South Vietnam	3–1	Hong Kong
Tran Tiet Ahn 11'; Vo Ba Hung 49'; Tran Van Xinh 66'		Li Kwok Keung 15'

Merdeka Stadium, Kuala Lumpur

== Fifth-place play-off ==
Malaysia defeated Singapore to finish fifth.

20 August 1971

Malaysia	4–2	Singapore

Merdeka Stadium, Kuala Lumpur

== Semi-finals ==
Burma and Indonesia advanced to the final.

17 August 1971

South Korea	0–1	Burma

Merdeka Stadium, Kuala Lumpur

18 August 1971

Indonesia	1–0	Taiwan

Merdeka Stadium, Kuala Lumpur

== Third-place play-off ==
South Korea defeated Taiwan to finish third.

20 August 1971

South Korea	2–0	Taiwan

Merdeka Stadium, Kuala Lumpur

== Final ==
Burma defeated Indonesia to win the competition.

21 August 1971

Burma	1–0	Indonesia

Merdeka Stadium, Kuala Lumpur
