= Wong Man-wai =

Taiwanese footballer

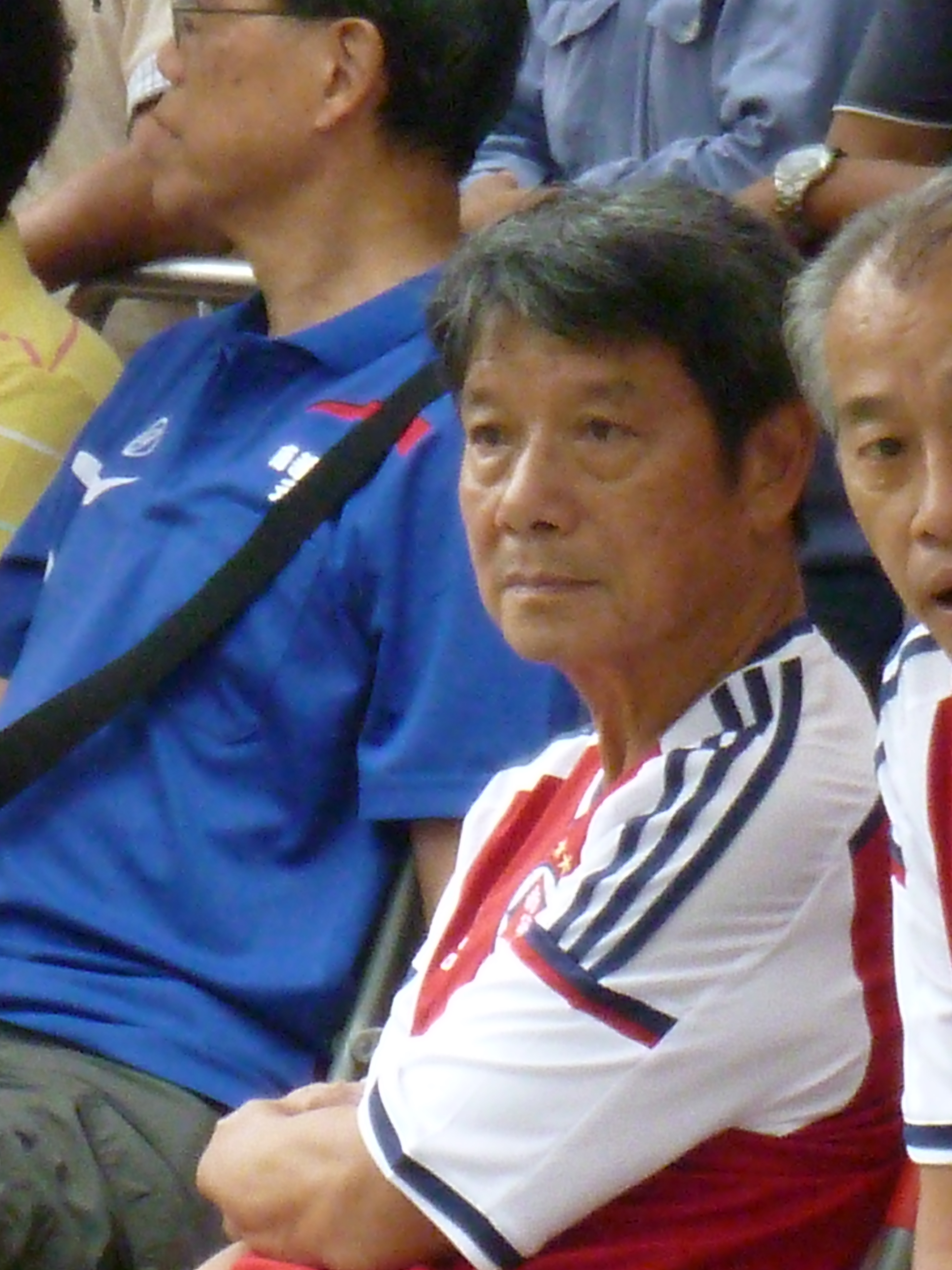
- Wong Man-wai in 2015

Personal information
- Date of birth: 10 March 1943 (age 83)
- Place of birth: Hong Kong, Hong Kong
- Position: Midfielder

International career
Years	Team	Apps	(Gls)
- Taiwan

Wong Man-wai (born 10 March 1943) is a Taiwanese former footballer. He competed in the men's tournament at the 1960 Summer Olympics.
