= Sri Lanka national football team results (1980–2009) =

- Win Draw Loss

Sri Lanka national football team fixtures and results between 1980–2009 are as follows:

== Results ==
=== 1980 ===
Date	Opponent	Result	Score	Venue	Competition
23 February 1980	Singapore	L	0–3	Singapore	Olympics Qualifiers
28 February 1980	North Korea	L	0–7	Singapore	Olympics Qualifiers
3 March 1980	India	L	0–4	Singapore	Olympics Qualifiers
5 March 1980	China	L	0–7	Singapore	Olympics Qualifiers
9 March 1980	Iran	L	0–11	Singapore	Olympics Qualifiers

=== 1983 ===
Date	Opponent	Result	Score	Venue	Competition
November 1983	Maldives	L	0–2	Maldives	Friendly
20 November 1983	Singapore	L	0–4	Colombo, Sri Lanka	Friendly

=== 1984 ===
Date	Opponent	Result	Score	Venue	Competition
30 September 1984	Maldives	W	5–0	Colombo, Sri Lanka	Friendly
20 October 1984	Oman	D	1–1	Jeddah, Saudi Arabia	1984 AFC Asian Cup qualification
24 October 1984	Nepal	W	4–0	Jeddah, Saudi Arabia	1984 AFC Asian Cup qualification
27 October 1984	Saudi Arabia	L	0–5	Jeddah, Saudi Arabia	1984 AFC Asian Cup qualification
31 October 1984	United Arab Emirates	L	1–5	Jeddah, Saudi Arabia	1984 AFC Asian Cup qualification

=== 1986 ===
Date	Opponent	Result	Score	Venue	Competition
23 April 1986	Pakistan	L	0–1	Islamabad, Pakistan	1986 Quaid-e-Azam International Tournament
30 April 1986	Nepal	D	2–2	Islamabad, Pakistan	1986 Quaid-e-Azam International Tournament
1 May 1986	China	L	0–3	Islamabad, Pakistan	1986 Quaid-e-Azam International Tournament

=== 1989 ===
Date	Opponent	Result	Score	Venue	Competition
21 October 1989	Bangladesh	L	0–3	Islamabad, Pakistan	South Asian Games
25 October 1989	India	L	1–2	Islamabad, Pakistan	South Asian Games

=== 1991 ===
Date	Opponent	Result	Score	Venue	Competition
22 December 1991	Nepal	D	2–2	Colombo, Sri Lanka	South Asian Games
26 December 1991	Maldives	L	0–1	Colombo, Sri Lanka	South Asian Games

=== 1993 ===
Date	Opponent	Result	Score	Venue	Competition
8 April 1993	United Arab Emirates	L	0–4	Tokyo, Japan	FIFA World Cup Q.
10 April 1993	Thailand	L	0–1	Tokyo, Japan	FIFA World Cup Q.
13 April 1993	Bangladesh	L	0–1	Tokyo, Japan	FIFA World Cup Q.
15 April 1993	Japan	L	0–5	Tokyo, Japan	FIFA World Cup Q.
28 April 1993	United Arab Emirates	L	0–3	Tokyo, Japan	FIFA World Cup Q.
3 May 1993	Thailand	L	0–3	Tokyo, Japan	FIFA World Cup Q.
5 May 1993	Japan	L	0–6	Tokyo, Japan	FIFA World Cup Q.
7 May 1993	Bangladesh	L	0–3	Tokyo, Japan	FIFA World Cup Q.
16 July 1993	India	L	0–2	Islamabad, Pakistan	SAFF Championship
18 July 1993	Pakistan	W	4–0	Islamabad, Pakistan	SAFF Championship
19 July 1993	Nepal	D	0–0	Islamabad, Pakistan	SAFF Championship
20 December 1993	Pakistan	W	2–1	Dhaka, Bangladesh	SAFF Games
22 December 1993	India	L	0–2	Dhaka, Bangladesh	SAFF Games
26 December 1993	Maldives	W	3–1	Dhaka, Bangladesh	SAFF Games

=== 1995 ===
Date	Opponent	Result	Score	Venue	Competition
29 March 1995	India	D	0–0	Colombo, Sri Lanka	SAFF Championship
31 March 1995	Nepal	W	2–1	Colombo, Sri Lanka	SAFF Championship
2 April 1995	India	W	1–0	Colombo, Sri Lanka	SAFF Championship
29 October 1995	Myanmar	L	0–2	(Myanmar) Yangon, Burma	Burma Tournament 1995
1 November 1995	Bangladesh	L	0–1	(Myanmar) Yangon, Burma	Burma Tournament 1995
23 December 1995	India	L	0–1	, India	South Asian Games
25 December 1995	Bangladesh	D	0–0	, Bangladesh	South Asian Games
28 December 1995	Nepal	D	0–0	Colombo, Sri Lanka	South Asian Games

=== 1996 ===
Date	Opponent	Result	Score	Venue	Competition
10 June 1996	Oman	L	0–3	Tehran, Iran	Asian Cup Q.
12 June 1996	Iran	L	0–7	Tehran, Iran	Asian Cup Q.
14 June 1996	Nepal	W	3–1	Tehran, Iran	Asian Cup Q.
17 June 1996	Iran	L	0–4	Tehran, Iran	Asian Cup Q.
19 June 1996	Oman	L	0–10	Tehran, Iran	Asian Cup Q.
21 June 1996	Nepal	W	2–0	Tehran, Iran	Asian Cup Q.
20 September 1996	Qatar	L	0–3	Qatar	FIFA World Cup q.
24 September 1996	India	D	1–1	Qatar	FIFA World Cup q.
26 September 1996	Philippines	W	3–0	Qatar	FIFA World Cup q.

=== 1997 ===
Date	Opponent	Result	Score	Venue	Competition
6 September 1997	Pakistan	W	2–0	, Nepal	SAFF Championship
8 September 1997	Nepal	W	3–1	, Nepal	SAFF Championship
10 September 1997	Maldives	L	1–2	, Nepal	SAFF Championship
13 September 1997	Pakistan	L	0–1	, Nepal	SAFF Championship

=== 1998 ===
Date	Opponent	Result	Score	Venue	Competition
15 November 1998	Maldives	D	2–2	Colombo, Sri Lanka	Bristol Freedom Cup

=== 1999 ===
Date	Opponent	Result	Score	Venue	Competition
23 April 1999	Maldives	D	0–0	India	SAFF Championship
25 April 1999	Nepal	L	2–3	India	SAFF Championship
24 September 1999	Maldives	L	0–4	Kathmandu.Nepal	SAFF Games
29 April 1999	Bangladesh	L	0–1	Kathmandu.Nepal	SAFF Games
22 November 1999	Uzbekistan	L	0–6	(United Arab Emirates) Abu dhabi.UAE	Asian Cup q.
24 November 1999	Bangladesh	L	1–3	(United Arab Emirates) Abu dhabi.UAE	Asian Cup q.
26 November 1999	India	L	1–3	(United Arab Emirates) Abu dhabi.UAE	Asian Cup q.
28 November 1999	United Arab Emirates	L	0–6	(United Arab Emirates) Abu dhabi.UAE	Asian Cup q.

=== 2000 ===
Date	Opponent	Result	Score	Venue	Competition
1 May 2000	Maldives	D	1–1	Malé, Maldives	Golden Jubilee Tournament
5 May 2000	India	W	1–0	Malé, Maldives	Golden Jubilee Tournament
7 May 2000	Bangladesh	W	1–0	Malé, Maldives	Golden Jubilee Tournament
10 May 2000	Maldives	W	1–1(6-5)	Malé, Maldives	Golden Jubilee Tournament
25 August 2000	Vietnam	D	2–2	Ho Chi Minh City, Vietnam	Ho Chi Minh City Cup
23 October 2000	Malaysia	L	0–2	Kuala Lumpur, Malaysia	Friendly
25 October 2000	Malaysia	L	1–3	Kuala Lumpur, Malaysia	Friendly
28 October 2000	Singapore	L	0–4	Singapore	Friendly

=== 2001 ===
Date	Opponent	Result	Score	Venue	Competition
28 March 2001	Cambodia	W	1–0	Colombo, Sri Lanka	Friendly
2 April 2001	United Arab Emirates	L	0–6	(United Arab Emirates) UAE	Friendly
13 May 2001	Thailand	L	2–4	Beirut, Lebanon	FIFA World Cup Q.
15 May 2001	Lebanon	L	0–4	Beirut, Lebanon	FIFA World Cup Q.
17 May 2001	Pakistan	D	3–3	Beirut, Lebanon	FIFA World Cup Q.
26 May 2001	Thailand	L	0–3	Beirut, Lebanon	FIFA World Cup Q.
28 May 2001	Lebanon	L	0–5	Beirut, Lebanon	FIFA World Cup Q.
30 May 2001	Pakistan	W	3–1	Beirut, Lebanon	FIFA World Cup Q.

=== 2002 ===
Date	Opponent	Result	Score	Venue	Competition
17 March 2002	Pakistan	D	1–1	Colombo, Sri Lanka	Friendly
19 March 2002	Pakistan	D	0–0	Kurunegala, Sri Lanka	Friendly
23 March 2002	Pakistan	W	1–0	Colombo, Sri Lanka	Friendly
25 March 2002	Pakistan	W	2–1	Kalutara, Sri Lanka	Friendly
4 April 2002	Maldives	W	1–0	Colombo, Sri Lanka	Friendly
6 April 2002	Maldives	D	1–1	Colombo, Sri Lanka	Friendly
27 November 2002	Vietnam	L	1–2	Colombo, Sri Lanka	Friendly
29 November 2002	Vietnam	D	1–1	Colombo, Sri Lanka	Friendly
1 December 2002	Vietnam	D	2–2	Colombo, Sri Lanka	Friendly

=== 2003 ===
Date	Opponent	Result	Score	Venue	Competition
10 January 2003	Afghanistan	W	1–0	Dhaka, Bangladesh	2003 South Asian Football Federation Gold Cup
12 January 2003	Pakistan	L	1–2	Dhaka, Bangladesh	2003 South Asian Football Federation Gold Cup
14 January 2003	India	D	1–1	Dhaka, Bangladesh	2003 South Asian Football Federation Gold Cup
21 March 2003	Timor-Leste	W	3–2	Colombo, Sri Lanka	Asian Cup Q.
25 March 2003	Chinese Taipei	W	2–1	Colombo, Sri Lanka	Asian Cup Q.
15 October 2003	Syria	L	0–5	Damascus, Syria	Asian Cup Q.
18 October 2003	Syria	L	0–8	Damascus, Syria	Asian Cup Q.
9 November 2003	Turkmenistan	L	0–1	Balkanabat, Turkmenistan	Asian Cup Q.
12 November 2003	Turkmenistan	L	0–3	Colombo, Sri Lanka	Asian Cup Q.
18 November 2003	United Arab Emirates	L	1–3	(United Arab Emirates) Dubai, UAE	Asian Cup Q.
22 November 2003	United Arab Emirates	L	0–3	Colombo, Sri Lanka	Asian Cup Q.
29 November 2003	Laos	D	0–0	Vientiane, Laos	FIFA World Cup Q.
3 December 2003	Laos	W	3–0	Colombo, Sri Lanka	FIFA World Cup Q.

=== 2004 ===
Date	Opponent	Result	Score	Venue	Competition
18 February 2004	Turkmenistan	L	0–2	Ashgabat, Turkmenistan	FIFA World Cup Q.
31 March 2004	Saudi Arabia	L	0–1	Colombo, Sri Lanka	FIFA World Cup Q.
9 June 2004	Indonesia	L	0–1	Jakarta, Indonesia	FIFA World Cup Q.
8 September 2004	Indonesia	D	2–2	Colombo, Sri Lanka	FIFA World Cup Q.
9 October 2004	Turkmenistan	D	2–2	Colombo, Sri Lanka	FIFA World Cup Q.
17 November 2004	Saudi Arabia	L	0–3	Dammam, Saudi Arabia	FIFA World Cup Q.
18 December 2004	Maldives	D	0–0	Colombo, Sri Lanka	Friendly

=== 2005 ===
Date	Opponent	Result	Score	Venue	Competition
7 December 2005	Pakistan	L	0–1	Islamabad, Pakistan	SAFF Championship
9 December 2005	Maldives	L	0–2	Islamabad, Pakistan	SAFF Championship
11 December 2005	Afghanistan	L	1–2	Islamabad, Pakistan	SAFF Championship

=== 2006 ===
Date	Opponent	Result	Score	Venue	Competition
2 April 2006	Brunei	W	1–0	Chittagong, Bangladesh	AFC Challenge Cup
4 April 2006	Bhutan	W	1–0	Chittagong, Bangladesh	AFC Challenge Cup
6 April 2006	Nepal	D	1–1	Chittagong, Bangladesh	AFC Challenge Cup
8 April 2006	Chinese Taipei	W	3–0	Chittagong, Bangladesh	AFC Challenge Cup
12 April 2006	Nepal	D	1–1	Chittagong, Bangladesh	AFC Challenge Cup
16 April 2006	Tajikistan	L	0–4	Chittagong, Bangladesh	AFC Challenge Cup

=== 2007 ===
Date	Opponent	Result	Score	Venue	Competition
24 March 2007	Malaysia	L	1–4	Colombo, Sri Lanka	Friendly
26 March 2007	Malaysia	W	2–1	Chittagong, Bangladesh	Friendly
21 October 2007	Qatar	L	0–1	Colombo, Sri Lanka	FIFA World Cup Q.
28 October 2007	Qatar	L	0–5	Doha, Qatar	FIFA World Cup Q.

=== 2008 ===
Date	Opponent	Result	Score	Venue	Competition
2 April 2008	Guam	W	5–1	(Chinese Taipei) Taipei, Taiwan	AFC Challenge Cup
4 April 2008	Pakistan	W	7–1	(Chinese Taipei) Taipei, Taiwan	AFC Challenge Cup
6 April 2008	Chinese Taipei	D	2–2	(Chinese Taipei) Taipei, Taiwan	AFC Challenge Cup
4 June 2008	Afghanistan	D	2–2	Colombo, Sri Lanka	SAFF Championship
6 June 2008	Bhutan	W	2–0	Colombo, Sri Lanka	SAFF Championship
8 June 2008	Bangladesh	W	1–0	Colombo, Sri Lanka	SAFF Championship
11 June 2008	Maldives	L	0–1	Colombo, Sri Lanka	SAFF Championship
31 July 2008	North Korea	L	0–3	Hyderabad, India	AFC Challenge Cup
2 August 2008	Myanmar	L	1–3	Hyderabad, India	AFC Challenge Cup
4 August 2008	Nepal	L	0–3	Hyderabad, India	AFC Challenge Cup

=== 2009 ===
Date	Opponent	Result	Score	Venue	Competition
14 March 2009	Nepal	L	0–0 2–4 (pen.)	Kathmandu, Nepal	2009 ANFA Cup
28 March 2009	Maldives	D	1–1	Colombo, Sri Lanka	Friendly
4 April 2009	Brunei	W	5–1	Colombo, Sri Lanka	AFC Challenge Cup
6 April 2009	Chinese Taipei	W	2–1	Colombo, Sri Lanka	AFC Challenge Cup
8 April 2009	Pakistan	D	2–2	Colombo, Sri Lanka	AFC Challenge Cup
22 August 2009	Lebanon	W	4–3	New Delhi, India	Nehru Cup
24 August 2009	Syria	L	0–4	New Delhi, India	Nehru Cup
26 August 2009	India	L	1–3	New Delhi, India	Nehru Cup
28 August 2009	Kyrgyzstan	L	1–4	New Delhi, India	Nehru Cup
4 December 2009	Pakistan	W	1–0	Dhaka, Bangladesh	SAFF Championship
6 December 2009	Bhutan	W	6–0	Dhaka, Bangladesh	SAFF Championship
8 December 2009	Bangladesh	L	1–2	Dhaka, Bangladesh	SAFF Championship
11 December 2009	Maldives	L	1–5	Dhaka, Bangladesh	SAFF Championship

== Head-to-head records ==
Sri Lanka national football team head-to-head records (1980–2009)
Opponent	Pld	W	D	L	GF	GA	GD	Pts	Confederation
Afghanistan	2	0	1	1	3	4	–1	1	AFC
Bangladesh	6	1	1	4	3	9	–6	4	AFC
Bhutan	2	2	0	0	8	0	+8	6	AFC
Brunei	1	1	0	0	5	1	+4	3	AFC
Cambodia	1	1	0	0	1	0	+1	3	AFC
China	1	0	0	1	0	7	–7	0	AFC
Chinese Taipei	2	2	1	0	7	3	+4	7	AFC
Guam	1	1	0	0	5	1	+4	3	AFC
India	7	2	2	3	4	10	–6	8	AFC
Indonesia	2	0	1	1	2	3	–1	1	AFC
Iran	2	0	0	2	0	18	–18	0	AFC
Japan	2	0	0	2	0	11	–11	0	AFC
Kyrgyzstan	1	0	0	1	1	4	–3	0	AFC
Laos	2	1	1	0	3	0	+3	4	AFC
Lebanon	3	1	0	2	4	12	–8	3	AFC
Malaysia	3	1	0	2	3	7	–4	3	AFC
Maldives	9	2	4	3	9	12	–3	10	AFC
Myanmar	2	0	0	2	1	5	–4	0	AFC
Nepal	7	2	4	1	9	7	+2	10	AFC
North Korea	2	0	0	2	0	10	–10	0	AFC
Oman	2	0	1	1	1	11	–10	1	AFC
Pakistan	11	6	3	2	19	11	+8	21	AFC
Qatar	3	0	0	3	0	9	–9	0	AFC
Saudi Arabia	2	0	0	2	0	6	–6	0	AFC
Singapore	2	0	0	2	0	7	–7	0	AFC
Syria	3	0	0	3	0	17	–17	0	AFC
Tajikistan	1	0	0	1	0	4	–4	0	AFC
Thailand	3	0	0	3	2	8	–6	0	AFC
Timor-Leste	1	1	0	0	3	2	+1	3	AFC
Turkmenistan	3	0	1	2	2	6	–4	1	AFC
United Arab Emirates	4	0	0	4	1	18	–17	0	AFC
Uzbekistan	1	0	0	1	0	6	–6	0	AFC
Vietnam	3	0	2	1	4	5	–1	2	AFC
Total	99	22	21	56	99	243	–144	87	
