= Abdullah Yeop Noordin =

Malaysian footballer

Abdullah bin Yeop Noordin
Personal information
- Date of birth: 7 March 1941
- Place of birth: Parit, Perak, Malaysia
- Date of death: 17 August 2014 (aged 73)
- Position: Right-back

Senior career*
Years	Team	Apps	(Gls)
1958–1959	Perak FA		
1960–1970	Selangor FA		

International career
1959–1960	Malaya U19		
1960–1962	Malaya		
1963–1969	Malaysia		

Managerial career
- 1971–1972: Selangor Burnley Cup
- 1973: Selangor FA
- 1988–89: Perak FA
- * Club domestic league appearances and goals

Abdullah bin Yeop Noordin (sometimes spelt as Abdullah Noordin or Abdullah Nordin; 7 March 1941 – 17 August 2014) was a Malaysian football player who represented the Malaysian national football team in the late 1960s.

== Career Overview ==
He start played for Perak FA and Selangor FA in Malaysia's domestic competition.

In 1959, he was selected for the inaugural Asian Youth Championship with Ng Boon Bee and became runners-up.

He was also a part of the Malaya player that winning bronze medals in the 1962 Asian Games.

Abdullah captained Malaysia from 1966 to 1969, winning the 1968 Pestabola Merdeka tournament.

After retired from playing, he became a coach for selangor youth in Burnley Cup and guiding Selangor to won 1973 Malaysia Cup. In 1988–89 Season, he managed Perak FA.

== Honour ==
=== Player ===
Perak

- Malaysia Cup runner-up:1959

Selangor

- Malaysia Cup: 1961, 1962, 1963, 1966, 1968, 1969
- Malaysia FAM Cup: 1961, 1962, 1966, 1968
- Asian Champion Club Tournament runner up: 1967

Malaysia U19

- AFC Youth Championship runner up: 1959, 1960

Malaysia

- Sea Games gold medal: 1961
- Asian Games bronze medal: 1962
- Pestabola Merdeka: 1968

=== Head coach ===
Selangor

- Malaysia Cup: 1973
