= Football at the 1964 Summer Olympics – Men's Asian Qualifiers =

Tournament details
- Teams: 16 (from 1 confederation)

Tournament statistics
- Matches played: 20
- Goals scored: 61 (3.05 per match)

The Asian section of the 1964 Summer Olympics – Men's Football Qualifiers acted as qualifiers for the 1964 Summer Olympics football tournament, held in Japan, for national teams that are members of Asia.

== Format ==
Five to six teams played home-and-away knockout matches over two legs each in three groups. The three winners of each group qualified for the Summer Olympics.

== Group 1 ==
| Team 1 | Agg. | Team 2 | 1st leg | 2nd leg |
|---|---|---|---|---|
Preliminary round
| South Korea | 2–2 | Taiwan | 2–1 | 0–1 |
Preliminary round play-off
| South Korea | w/o (Note: The play-off was awarded to South Korea, as Taiwan were disqualified due to objecting to playing at a neutral venue and refused to travel.) | Taiwan | | |
First round
| South Korea | w/o (Note: Philippines withdrew.) | Philippines | — | — |
| South Vietnam | 2–1 | Israel | 0–1 | 2–0 |
Second round
| South Korea | 5–2 | South Vietnam | 3–0 | 2–2 |

== Group 2 ==
| Team 1 | Agg. | Team 2 | 1st leg | 2nd leg |
|---|---|---|---|---|
Preliminary round
| Malaysia | 3–4 | Thailand | 1–1 | 2–3 |
First round
| Burma | 0–1 | North Korea | 0–0 | 0–1 |
| Thailand | w/o (Note: Indonesia withdrew.) | Indonesia | — | — |
Second round
| North Korea | 7–0 | Thailand | 2–0 | 5–0 |

== Group 3 ==
| Team 1 | Agg. | Team 2 | 1st leg | 2nd leg |
|---|---|---|---|---|
Preliminary round
| Iran | 4–2 | Pakistan | 4–1 | 0–1 |
| Ceylon | 3–12 | India | 3–5 | 0–7 |
First round
| Iran | 4–0 | Iraq | 4–0 | 0–0 |
| India | w/o (Note: Lebanon withdrew.) | Lebanon | — | — |
Second round
| Iran | 6–1 | India | 3–0 | 3–1 |

== Qualified teams ==
The following three teams from Asia qualified for the final tournament.

| Team | Qualified as | Qualified on | Previous appearances in the Summer Olympics |
|---|---|---|---|
| Japan | Hosts | 26 May 1959 | 2 (1936, 1956) |
| Iran | Group 3 winners | 21 June 1964 | 0 |
| South Korea | Group 1 winners | 28 June 1964 | 1 (1948) |
| North Korea | Group 2 winners | 28 June 1964 | 0 |
