= Tuan Mohamed Amidon =

Sri Lankan footballer

T.M. Amidon
- Amidon post-retirement

Personal information
- Full name: Tuan Mohamed Amidon
- Date of birth: c. 1935
- Place of birth: Kandy, British Ceylon (present-day Sri Lanka)
- Date of death: May 2018 (aged 83)
- Place of death: Unknown
- Position: Inside left

Senior career*
Years	Team	Apps	(Gls)
- Young Wonders SC
- Wells Spinning Club
- Black Square FC
1961–1983	Army Bullets		

International career
1964–1970	Ceylon		
- * Club domestic league appearances and goals

Tuan Mohamed Amidon (Sinhala: තුවාන් මොහොමඩ් ඇමිඩන්; c. 1935 – May 2018) was a Sri Lankan football player who primarily played as an inside-left. He represented the Sri Lanka national team.

== Early life ==
Born in Kandy, British Ceylon, Amidon attended Midland College in Peradeniya Road, Kandy. At fifteen he played for a combined schools side against a visiting combined schools side from Pakistan, a turning point in his early football career.

== Club career ==
After playing for Young Wanderers in Kandy, Amidon moved to Colombo, where he joined Wellawatte Spinning and Weaving Mills and played in the Mercantile Football League. His performances caught the attention of scouts, leading to a move to Black Square FC, a team playing in the Colombo Football League.

Amidon made a significant impact at Black Square, catching the attention of Brigadier Ramanayake, who was scouting for talent to join the Army Bullets team. Impressed by Amidon's abilities, Ramanayake recruited him, which led to a military football career spanning 22 years. In the Inter-Services Soccer tournaments, he helped Army secure the championship for nine consecutive years. His contributions in high-scoring matches, such as the 8–2 victory over the Ceylon Air Force, where Amidon scored three goals and the 15–1 demolition of the Ceylon Navy. In the latter match, Amidon contributed four goals, most of which came from the left side.

In addition to football, Amidon also played rugby, as a full-back, he represented the Army's rugby team, where he formed a partnership with two of Sri Lanka's best scrum halves, the late Denzil Kobbekaduwa and the late Bertie Dias.

== International career ==
In 1964, Amidon represented the Ceylon national team in two friendly matches against Indonesia, scoring in 3–9 defeat in the first match. On 28 February 1965, Ceylon secured their first international victory on home soil, defeating Pakistan 3–1 at the Sugathadasa Stadium in Colombo, with Amidon scoring the opening goal right before half-time. He represented the team in the Aga Khan Gold Cup in both 1968 and 1970. He was reserve member of the team that played two matches against Israel in the 1968 Summer Olympics qualifiers. In the same year, Amidon toured East Germany and England with Ceylon, playing exhibition matches against numerous amateur teams. He was also present during Ceylon's Southern Quadrangular Soccer Tournament triumph in 1970, defeating Mysore football team from India in the final.

== Death ==
He died in May 2018, at the age of 83.

== Career statistics ==
=== International goals ===
List of international goals scored by Tuan Mohamed Amidon
No.	Date	Venue	Opponent	Score	Result	Competition	Ref.
1	23 February 1964	Sugathadasa Stadium, Colombo, Ceylon	Indonesia		3–9	Friendly	
2	28 February 1965	Sugathadasa Stadium, Colombo, Ceylon	Pakistan	1–1	3–1	Friendly	
