= Kim Seung-il =

Kim Seung-il may refer to:

- Kim Seung-il (gymnast) (born 1985), South Korean gymnast
- Kim Seung-il (footballer) (born 1945), North Korean footballer

== See also ==
- Kim Sung-il (disambiguation)
