= José Mari Martínez (Filipino footballer) =

Filipino footballer and sports executive

President of the Philippine Football Federation
- In office 2007 – November 27, 2010
- Preceded by: Johnny Romualdez
- Succeeded by: Mariano Araneta

Personal details
- Born: Mariano V. Araneta, Jr.
Association football career
International career
| Years | Team | Apps | (Gls) |
| – | Philippines | | (~2) |

José Mari Martínez was a Filipino sports executive who served as President of the Philippine Football Federation and a Philippine international footballer.

== Football career ==
Martinez was a player for the Philippine national team. He was one of the three goalscorers in the Philippines' first official FIFA win, a 3–0 win over Republic of China (now playing as Chinese Taipei) in the Asian qualifiers for the 1972 Summer Olympics At the youth level, Martinez, also played for the San Beda College in the National Collegiate Athletic Association. In 2004, he was given an outstanding player award along with Miguel Crame by the Philippine Football Federation, with the two being prominent footballers of the 1970s.

Scores and results list the Philippines' goal tally first.

| Date | Venue | Opponent | Score | Result | Competition |
|---|---|---|---|---|---|
| 25 September 1971 | Seoul | Taiwan | 2–0 | 3–0 | 1972 Football Olympic Tournament - Asian Qualification |
| 27 September 1971 | Seoul | Japan | 1–7 | 1–8 | 1972 Football Olympic Tournament - Asian Qualification |

== President of the Philippine Football Federation ==
=== 2007 leadership dispute ===
In 2007, Martinez's first year as President of the Philippine Football Federation, there was an attempt to remove Martinez from office. However this move was halted when several members of the opposition decided against pursuing for Martinez's ouster, following a guest appearance by then Asian Football Confederation President Mohammed bin Hammam who announced a gift donation to the PFF amounting to ₱10 million. This move was viewed as a bribe by critics of Martinez.

=== PFF House of Football in Pasig ===
On August 2, 2008, the PFF's new headquarters, the PFF House of Football, was inaugurated by then FIFA President Sepp Blatter and AFC President bin Hammam in Barangay Oranbo, Pasig. The PFF moved to the building after occupying the PhilSports Complex as its headquarters for decades.

=== 2009 national teams crisis ===
In 2009, a crisis affected the Philippine women's national futsal and men's senior teams which saw the ouster of women's futsal coach Emmanuel Batungbacal and long-time men's national football coach Juan Cutillas. Batungbacal was sacked by the PFF under recommendation from PFF Futsal Committee chairman Esmaeil Sedigh, from his position for sending an unsanctioned squad to futsal competition in New Zealand. Batungbacal described the move as "ironic" and showed documents to the media showing that the PFF indeed sanctioned his squad. He also accused Martinez of ignoring his pleas to express his concerns regarding the matter. The players who played under Batungbacal resigned from international duty as protests. Martinez said that Batungbacal was sacked due to lack of a coaching license and denied accusations that he ignored Batungbacal saying a dialogue between them already took place.

=== Ouster in 2010 ===
Martinez was accused and charged in court for falsifying public documents particularly when he notarized a Secretary's Certification with an individual by the name of Henry Tsai included as one of the signatories to the account of the federation in Banco de Oro and Bank of the Philippine Islands even if there was no motion to include Tsai as a signatory. Tsai was a former co-worker of Martinez at Soriamont Steamship Agencies, who was also named Managing Consultant of the PFF and later Executive Vice President. Martinez is accused of misusing funds of the federation amounting to ₱5 million, ₱4 million of which is unliquidated, which was designated to Tsai, for his own personal use and buying shares at the Valle Verde Country Club.

Martinez said that he made a mistake of making Tsai as Executive Vice President of the PFF and entrusting the latter of funds of the federation. He accused the Tsai who went into hiding of taking away funds after hiring auditing firms to look on the PFF's books of accounts. He maintained to critics within the federation that he did not misuse any funds and will not resign from his post.

On November 27, 2010, at the PFF 7th Ordinary Congress at the PhilSports Complex in Pasig, Martinez was ousted by 25 Presidents out of the 29 present member associations to approve a resolution made by 8 members of the Board of Governors calling for the ousting and replacement of Martinez as PFF president. Mariano Araneta was named Interim President.
