= Subhani Hassimdeen =

Sri Lankan footballer

- Hassimdeen during his playing years

Personal information
- Full name: Subhani Hassimdeen
- Date of birth: Unknown
- Place of birth: Ceylon
- Date of death: 25 November 2023 (aged 77)
- Place of death: Colombo, Sri Lanka
- Position: Forward

Youth career
- Newnham Playground
- Zahira College

Senior career*
Years	Team	Apps	(Gls)
- Eleven Youngsters
- Black Square
- Victory SC
- Royal Ceylon Air Force
- Wellawatta Spinning & Weaving Mills
- Combined Services
- City Football League XI
- Colombo League XI
- Mercantile League XI

International career
1965–1975	Ceylon		

Managerial career
- 1996: Sri Lanka U16
- 1998: Sri Lanka U19
- 1999: Sri Lanka U23
- 1999: Sri Lanka
- * Club domestic league appearances and goals

Subhani Hassimdeen (died 25 November 2023) was a Sri Lankan footballer and coach. He was considered as one of the finest players to have played for Sri Lanka national football team at international level. He was considered as one of the go-to reliable strikers during the time frame between 1965 and 1975.

== Early life ==
Subhani was born in Ceylon into the prominent Hassimdeen sporting family of Slave Island. He was one of four brothers—Naheem Hassimdeen, Muzammil Hassimdeen and Farook Hassimdeen—who collectively represented Ceylon at international level football for a continuous 35-year period from 1951 to 1986. The family belonged to the Sri Lankan Malay community.

Subhani started playing football at a young age, representing Newnham Playground at age 8, and later played for Zahira College at age 14, where he also pursued his primary education.

== Club career ==
Subhani progressed to Sri Lanka’s first division, playing for Eleven Youngsters FC, Black Square FC and Victory FC, and in 1965 joined the Royal Ceylon Air Force football team, helping them win the Inter-Services Championship.

He later signed for Wellawatta Spinning & Weaving Mills, captaining the side to unbeaten league and knockout titles in the Mercantile League in 1970 and 1971. Over his domestic career he also represented Combined Services, the City Football League, the Colombo League and the Mercantile League representative teams in local competitions. In the Ran Pandu Football Festival in 1974, he was voted the best footballer.

== International career ==
Subhani donned the Sri Lanka national team jersey in 1965. He played a vital pivotal role in helping Ceylon Colts XI to secure runners-up finish at the 1968 Aga Khan Gold Cup. He also captained the national side in 1972 at several international tournaments in Malaysia, Singapore and India. He was also a key member of Sri Lanka's famous tours to countries such as Israel, West Germany, England and Iran with his brother Muzammil Hassimdeen. He was also instrumental in assisting Sri Lanka to win the 1970 Southern Quadrangular Football Tournament.

His final international appearance in Sri Lankan colours came during the 1975 Vittal Memorial Trophy Tournament which was held in Tamil Nadu. He scored a match winning goal in the semi-finals of the 1975 Vittal Memorial Trophy Tournament which propelled Sri Lanka to the final. With the national team, he also played international friendlies against touring club sides such as Nuremberg, Essen, Pallenberg and SC Wacker 04 of Germany, Maccabi of Israel, Dallas Tornado of USA, Žalgiris and Dynamo Moscow of the Soviet Union, and Manchester City and Southampton of England.

== Rugby career ==
Hassimdeen briefly played rugby for the Havelock Sports Club Bambaras side in 1971 while continuing his football commitments.

== Post-retirement ==
Following his retirement as player, Hassimdeen served in multiple national roles across different age groups, beginning as national selector in 1988 and later holding positions as intermediate national coach in 1989, junior national coach in 1996, Sri Lanka U19 coach at the 1998 AFC Youth Championship qualification, and Sri Lanka U23 coach in 1999. In 1999 he also briefly served as senior national team coach at the 1999 SAFF Gold Cup.

In 2000 he was appointed Director of Youth Football Development, launching a grassroots programme that introduced structured training to more than 600 schools in Sri Lanka for boys under 12. He also served as a member of the England Coaches Association from 2001 to 2004. He also followed many coaching courses conducted by FIFA and Asian Football Council.

He was also a guest writer for The Sunday Times newspaper, where he contributed as a football columnist for several years until his health conditions deteriorated due to the age factor.

== Death ==
He died on 25 November 2023 at the age of 77. His funeral was held on 25 November 2023 at the Jawatte Burial Ground in Colombo.

== Career statistics ==
=== International goals ===
List of international goals scored by Subhani Hassimdeen
No.	Date	Venue	Opponent	Score	Result	Competition	Ref.
1	9 June 1972	Jakarta, Indonesia	Burma	1–0	2–4	1972 Jakarta Anniversary Tournament	
2	20 July 1972	Merdeka Stadium, Kuala Lumpur, Malaysia	Philippines	1–4	1–4	1972 Merdeka Tournament	
3	22 July 1972	Merdeka Stadium, Kuala Lumpur, Malaysia	Khmer Republic	1–5	1–6	1972 Merdeka Tournament	
