= Pathiniya Durage Sirisena =

Sri Lankan footballer and coach

P. D. Sirisena
- Srisena post-retirement

Personal information
- Full name: Pathiniya Durage Sirisena
- Date of birth: 3 January 1940
- Place of birth: Colombo, British Ceylon (present-day Sri Lanka)
- Date of death: 18 December 2017 (aged 77)
- Place of death: Rajagiriya, Sri Lanka
- Position: Inside left

Senior career*
Years	Team	Apps	(Gls)
1956–1972	Saunders SC		
1963	Dhaka Wanderers		
1965	Dhaka Wanderers		
1966–1967	AVC Heracles		
1975–1977	Swansea United		

International career
1962–1969	Sri Lanka		

Managerial career
- –: Saunders SC
- 1976–1998: Sri Lanka
- 1987: New Radiant SC
- 1988: Maldives
- * Club domestic league appearances and goals

P. D. Sirisena (Sinhala: පී.ඩී. සිරිසේන; 3 January 1940 – 18 December 2017) was a Sri Lankan football player and coach. He was captain of the Sri Lanka national team and eventually served their coach on various occasions.

== Early life ==
Sirisena was born in Colombo, British Ceylon. He was a student at Maradana Central College.

== Club career ==
Sirisena started his football career with Saunders SC, whose home ground, Price Park, was just behind his house. At only 16 years old, he played his first significant game for the team. In 1960, he gained fame by scoring six goals in the Sri Lanka FA Cup final, a record that still remains unbroken. He is also one of the few from his country to feature in foreign leagues, representing Dhaka Wanderers Club in 1963 and 1965, AVC Heracles from 1966 to 1967, and Swansea United from 1975 to 1977.

== International career ==
Sirisena made his international debut in 1962 and went on to represent Sri Lanka in 35 matches, serving as the team captain on seven occasions over a span of seven years. At youth level, he participated in the 1959 AFC Youth Championship held in Malaysia. In August 1960, he traveled to Lahore, Pakistan to participate in a Sheikh Ismail Gold Shield Football Tournament, representing Ceylon Football League Team.

== Coaching career ==
Sirisena, an AFC A license holder and instructor, began his coaching career with Saunders SC and eventually went on to coach the Sri Lanka national team from 1976 to 1998. He also managed the Sri Lankan team at the 1980 Summer Olympics qualifiers held in Singapore, and before their encounter against North Korea, he declared "We are going to win!" to Singaporean media. Nonetheless, his team ended up suffering a 0–7 defeat. Sirisena also experienced coaching abroad, managing New Radiant SC in Maldives and was eventually appointed head coach of the Maldives national team in 1988.

== Personal life ==
In 2014, Sirisena had the rare honor of receiving a Lifetime Achievement Award from the then FIFA President, Sepp Blatter, along with a reward of Rs. 500,000, during the 75th anniversary celebration of football in Sri Lanka. He is the first Sri Lankan athlete to have a ground named in his honor while still alive. In 1987, Ranasinghe Premadasa, the Prime Minister at the time, renamed the Public Ground in Maligawatta, Colombo, to the P.D. Sirisena Ground.

== Death ==
Sirisena suffered from Parkinson's disease and died on 18 December 2017 at his residence in Rajagiriya in the Colombo District, Sri Lanka.

== Career statistics ==
=== International goals ===
List of international goals scored by P.D. Sirisena
No.	Date	Venue	Opponent	Score	Result	Competition	Ref.
1	27 November 1963	Sugathadasa Stadium, Colombo, Ceylon	India	2–2	3–5	1964 Summer Olympics qualifiers	
