= Miguel Crame =

Filipino footballer

Senior career*
Years	Team	Apps	(Gls)
1960s–1972	Meralco		
1972	Cheng Hua		

International career
1969–1970	Philippines U19		
1971–1972	Philippines		
- * Club domestic league appearances and goals

Miguel Crame is a retired footballer who played for the Philippine national football team.

== Club career ==
Miguel Crame is a center forward and winger, most known for his stint with Meralco. He helped the club win the Lobregat Cup for three consecutive editions from 1967 to 1969. He reportedly held the domestice-league record of 10 goals which he scored for Meralco in the 21-0 demolition of La Perla in 1972. He also briefly played for Cheng Hua in 1972.

== International career ==
Crame was a member of the Philippine national football team and played at both the youth and senior level. He made 52 appearances for the Philippines, including both youth and senior appearances and played at the 1970 AFC Youth Championship, 1972 Summer Olympic Asian qualifiers, 1971 and 1972 Merdeka Cup, 1972 Jakarta Independence Cup and 1972 President's Cup.

At the 1972 Summer Olympics Asian qualifiers, Crame was one of the three goalscorers in the Philippines' first official FIFA win, a 3–0 win over Republic of China (now playing as Chinese Taipei).

== Honors ==
Crame was awarded the Malakas at Maganda trophy for football at the first All-Filipino Sports Awards in 1973. In 2004, he was given an outstanding player award along with Jose Mari Martinez by the Philippine Football Federation, with the two being prominent footballers of the 1970s.

== Personal life ==
Crame migrated to the United States in 1973.
