= 1972 Merdeka Tournament =

Tournament details
- Host country: Malaysia
- Dates: 12–29 July
- Teams: 12

Final positions
- Champions: South Korea (4th title)
- Runners-up: Malaysia
- Third place: Japan
- Fourth place: Burma B

Tournament statistics
- Matches played: 38
- Goals scored: 142 (3.74 per match)

The 1972 Merdeka Tournament (Malay: 1972 Pestabola Merdeka) was the 16th invitational international association football championship held to commemorate the independence of Malaysia. Hosted by Malaysia, the competition ran from 12 to 29 July 1972 and was contested by the national teams of Hong Kong, Indonesia, Japan, the Khmer Republic, Malaysia, the Philippines, Singapore, South Korea, Sri Lanka and Thailand as well as the B teams of Burma and Malaysia.

After two rounds of play, South Korea were crowned champions of the competition after defeating Malaysia 2–1 in the final. In the third-place play-off, Japan defeated Malaysia B 1–0.

== Background ==
The Merdeka Tournament was founded in 1957 as a means to celebrate Independence Day in Malaya. It is the oldest invitational international association football tournament in Asia. Burma were the defending champions after defeating Indonesia in the final of the previous edition in 1971. South Korea were the most successful team in the history of the competition having won the title on four occasions.

== Format ==
In total, 12 teams took part in the competition. They were drawn into two single round robin groups of six teams. The group winners and runners-up would then contest the semi-finals which would decide the teams contesting the final and third-place play-off. Placement matches were also held for the teams finishing third, fourth, fifth and sixth in the group stage.

=== Participants ===
- Burma B
- Hong Kong
- Indonesia
- Japan
- Khmer Republic
- Malaysia
- Malaysia B
- Philippines
- Singapore
- South Korea
- Sri Lanka
- Thailand

== Group stage ==
=== Group A ===
Malaysia and Japan advanced to the semi-finals. The Khmer Republic, the Philippines, Burma B and Sri Lanka advanced to the placement matches.

==== Table ====
| Team | Pld | W | D | L | GF | GA | GD | Pts |
|---|---|---|---|---|---|---|---|---|
| Malaysia | 5 | 5 | 0 | 0 | 18 | 3 | +15 | 10 |
| Japan | 5 | 4 | 0 | 1 | 21 | 6 | +15 | 8 |
| Khmer Republic | 5 | 2 | 1 | 2 | 12 | 14 | –2 | 5 |
| Philippines | 5 | 1 | 2 | 2 | 8 | 10 | –2 | 4 |
| Burma B | 5 | 1 | 1 | 3 | 8 | 15 | –7 | 3 |
| Sri Lanka | 5 | 0 | 0 | 5 | 5 | 24 | –19 | 0 |

==== Matches ====
12 July 1972

| Malaysia | 4–1 | Sri Lanka |

Merdeka Stadium, Kuala Lumpur
12 July 1972

| Japan | 4–1 | Khmer Republic |

Merdeka Stadium, Kuala Lumpur

14 July 1972

| Malaysia | 1–0 | Philippines |

Merdeka Stadium, Kuala Lumpur
14 July 1972

| Khmer Republic | 2–1 | Burma B |

Merdeka Stadium, Kuala Lumpur

16 July 1972

| Malaysia | 4–0 | Burma B |

Merdeka Stadium, Kuala Lumpur
16 July 1972

| Japan | 5–0 | Sri Lanka |

Perak Stadium, Ipoh
16 July 1972

| Khmer Republic | 2–2 | Philippines |

Merdeka Stadium, Kuala Lumpur

18 July 1972

| Japan | 5–1 | Philippines |

Merdeka Stadium, Kuala Lumpur
18 July 1972

| Burma B | 5–2 | Sri Lanka |

Merdeka Stadium, Kuala Lumpur

19 July 1972

| Malaysia | 6–1 | Khmer Republic |

Perak Stadium, Ipoh

20 July 1972

| Japan | 6–1 | Burma B |

Merdeka Stadium, Kuala Lumpur
20 July 1972

| Philippines | 4–1 | Sri Lanka |

Merdeka Stadium, Kuala Lumpur

22 July 1972

| Malaysia | 3–1 | Japan |

Merdeka Stadium, Kuala Lumpur
22 July 1972

| Khmer Republic | 6–1 | Sri Lanka |

Merdeka Stadium, Kuala Lumpur

23 July 1972

| Philippines | 1–1 | Burma B |

Perak Stadium, Ipoh

=== Group B ===
South Korea and Malaysia B advanced to the semi-finals. Hong Kong, Thailand, Indonesia and Singapore advanced to the placement matches.

==== Table ====
| Team | Pld | W | D | L | GF | GA | GD | Pts |
|---|---|---|---|---|---|---|---|---|
| South Korea | 5 | 4 | 1 | 0 | 11 | 2 | +9 | 9 |
| Malaysia B | 5 | 4 | 0 | 1 | 11 | 5 | 6 | 8 |
| Hong Kong | 5 | 2 | 2 | 1 | 8 | 7 | +1 | 6 |
| Thailand | 5 | 1 | 1 | 3 | 6 | 9 | –3 | 3 |
| Indonesia | 5 | 1 | 1 | 3 | 4 | 7 | –3 | 3 |
| Singapore | 5 | 0 | 1 | 4 | 2 | 12 | –10 | 1 |

==== Matches ====
13 July 1972

| Malaysia B | 1–3 | South Korea |

Merdeka Stadium, Kuala Lumpur
13 July 1972

| Indonesia | 0–0 | Singapore |

Merdeka Stadium, Kuala Lumpur

15 July 1972

| Hong Kong | 0–0 | South Korea |

Merdeka Stadium, Kuala Lumpur
15 July 1972

| Thailand | 2–0 | Singapore |

Merdeka Stadium, Kuala Lumpur

16 July 1972

| Malaysia B | 2–1 | Indonesia |

Perak Stadium, Ipoh

17 July 1972

| South Korea | 2–0 | Thailand |

Merdeka Stadium, Kuala Lumpur
17 July 1972

| Hong Kong | 4–1 | Singapore |

Merdeka Stadium, Kuala Lumpur

19 July 1972

| South Korea | 4–1 | Singapore |

Perak Stadium, Ipoh
19 July 1972

| Malaysia B | 4–1 | Hong Kong |

Merdeka Stadium, Kuala Lumpur
19 July 1972

| Thailand | 2–3 | Indonesia |

Merdeka Stadium, Kuala Lumpur

21 July 1972

| Malaysia B | 2–0 | Thailand |

Merdeka Stadium, Kuala Lumpur
21 July 1972

| Hong Kong | 1–0 | Indonesia |

Merdeka Stadium, Kuala Lumpur

23 July 1972

| South Korea | 2–0 | Indonesia |

Merdeka Stadium, Kuala Lumpur
23 July 1972

| Malaysia B | 2–0 | Singapore |

Merdeka Stadium, Kuala Lumpur
23 July 1972

| Hong Kong | 2–2 | Thailand |

Perak Stadium, Ipoh

== 11th-place play-off ==
Singapore defeated Sri Lanka to finish 11th.

25 July 1972

| Singapore | 6–1 | Sri Lanka |

Merdeka Stadium, Kuala Lumpur

== Ninth-place play-off ==
Burma B defeated Indonesia to finish ninth.

26 July 1972

| Burma B | 3–2 | Indonesia |

Merdeka Stadium, Kuala Lumpur

== Seventh-place play-off ==
Thailand defeated the Philippines to finish seventh.

29 July 1972

| Thailand | 4–0 | Philippines |

Merdeka Stadium, Kuala Lumpur

== Fifth-place play-off ==
The Khmer Republic defeated Hong Kong to finish fifth.

28 July 1972

| Khmer Republic | 1–0 | Hong Kong |

Merdeka Stadium, Kuala Lumpur

== Semi-finals ==
Malaysia and South Korea advanced to the final.

25 July 1972

| Malaysia | 4–0 | Malaysia B |

Merdeka Stadium, Kuala Lumpur

26 July 1972

| South Korea | 3–0 | Japan |

Merdeka Stadium, Kuala Lumpur

== Third-place play-off ==
Japan defeated Malaysia B to finish third.

28 July 1972

| Malaysia B | 0–1 | Japan |

Merdeka Stadium, Kuala Lumpur

== Final ==
South Korea defeated Malaysia to win the competition.

29 July 1972

| Malaysia | 1–2 | South Korea |

Merdeka Stadium, Kuala Lumpur
