= Singapore national football team results (1970–1989) =

- Win Draw Loss

This article provides details of international football games played by the Singapore national football team from 1970 to 1989.

== Acronyms ==
Acronyms	Full Name
WC	FIFA World Cup
AFC	Asian Football Federation
AFF	ASEAN Football Federation
Q	Qualification rounds
PO	Play-off round
GS	Group stage
R32	Round of 32
R16	Round of 16
QF	Quarter-finals
SF	Semi-finals
3rd PO	Third place match/play-off
F	Final

== Results ==
=== 1970 ===
20 June 1970 Jakarta Anniversary Tournament	Malaysia	5–0	Singapore	Jakarta, Indonesia

1 August 1970 Merdeka Tournament	Indonesia	3–1	Singapore	Malaysia

4 August 1970 Merdeka Tournament	South Korea	4–0	Singapore	Malaysia

6 August 1970 Merdeka Tournament	Hong Kong	3–2	Singapore	Malaysia

8 August 1970 Merdeka Tournament	Thailand	5–4	Singapore	Malaysia

10 August 1970 Merdeka Tournament	Japan	4–0	Singapore	Malaysia

13 August 1970 Merdeka Tournament	South Vietnam	4–0	Singapore	Malaysia

19 August 1970 Friendly	Singapore	3–8	India	Singapore

8 November 1970 King's Cup	Singapore	1–0	Hong Kong	Thailand

10 November 1970 King's Cup	Thailand	3–1	Singapore	Thailand

14 November 1970 King's Cup	Laos	3–0	Singapore	Thailand

16 November 1970 King's Cup	South Korea	4–0	Singapore	Thailand

=== 1971 ===
5 June 1971 Jakarta Anniversary Tournament	Indonesia	3–0	Singapore	Jakarta, Indonesia

9 June 1971 Jakarta Anniversary Tournament	Burma	6–0	Singapore	Jakarta, Indonesia

5 August 1971 Merdeka Tournament	Singapore	2–1	Hong Kong	Kuala Lumpur, Malaysia

7 August 1971 Merdeka Tournament	Singapore	1–0	Burma	Kuala Lumpur, Malaysia

10 August 1971 Merdeka Tournament	India	2–2	Singapore	Kuala Lumpur, Malaysia

13 August 1971 Merdeka Tournament	Indonesia	4–0	Singapore	Kuala Lumpur, Malaysia

15 August 1971 Merdeka Tournament	Philippines	4–4	Singapore	Kuala Lumpur, Malaysia

20 August 1971 Merdeka Tournament	Malaysia	4–2	Singapore	Kuala Lumpur, Malaysia

23 August 1971 Friendly tournament	Singapore	2–2	Malaysia	Singapore

27 August 1971 Friendly tournament	Singapore	3–2	Indonesia	Singapore

28 October 1971 Vietnam Independence Cup	Thailand	1–0	Singapore	South Vietnam

30 October 1971 Vietnam Independence Cup	Malaysia	1–1	Singapore	South Vietnam

31 October 1971 Vietnam Independence Cup	Singapore	3–1	Thailand	South Vietnam

7 November 1971 King's Cup	Thailand	2–0	Singapore	Thailand

9 November 1971 King's Cup	South Vietnam	5–4	Singapore	Thailand

13 December 1971 1971 Southeast Asian Peninsular Games	South Vietnam	3–1	Singapore	Kuala Lumpur, Malaysia
	Tran Van Inh 33' 43'; Tran Tien Anh 61'		Quah Kim Song 31'	Stadium: Merdeka Stadium

14 December 1971 1971 Southeast Asian Peninsular Games	Burma	8–1	Singapore	Kuala Lumpur, Malaysia
	Ye Nyunt 16' 23' 42' 84'; Win Maung 38'; Win Nyunt 44'; Maung Tin 46' 61'		(o.g.)	Stadium: Merdeka Stadium

=== 1972 ===
6 June 1972 Jakarta Anniversary Tournament	Khmer Republic	3–0	Singapore	Jakarta, Indonesia

8 June 1972 Jakarta Anniversary Tournament	Philippines	2–0	Singapore	Jakarta, Indonesia

10 June 1972 Jakarta Anniversary Tournament	Singapore	1–1	Thailand	Jakarta, Indonesia

23 June 1972 Friendly tournament	Singapore	3–1	Sri Lanka	Singapore

25 June 1972 Friendly tournament	Singapore	1–0	Khmer Republic	Singapore

13 July 1972 Merdeka Tournament	Indonesia	0–0	Singapore	Malaysia

15 July 1972 Merdeka Tournament	Thailand	2–0	Singapore	Malaysia

17 July 1972 Merdeka Tournament	Hong Kong	4–1	Singapore	Malaysia

19 July 1972 Merdeka Tournament	South Korea	4–1	Singapore	Malaysia

25 July 1972 Merdeka Tournament	Singapore	6–1	Sri Lanka	Malaysia

2 August 1972 Friendly tournament	Singapore	6–1	Sri Lanka	Singapore

6 August 1972 Friendly tournament	Singapore	0–2	Hong Kong	Singapore

21 September 1972 Presidents Cup	Indonesia	2–1	Singapore	South Korea

23 September 1972 Presidents Cup	Singapore	5–0	Philippines	South Korea

25 September 1972 Presidents Cup	Burma	1–0	Singapore	South Korea

28 September 1972 Presidents Cup	Thailand	4–1	Singapore	South Korea

5 October 1972 Friendly	Hong Kong	2–3	Singapore	Hong Kong

28 October 1972 Vietnam Independence Cup	Singapore	1–0	Khmer Republic	South Vietnam

29 October 1972 Vietnam Independence Cup	South Vietnam	4–1	Singapore	South Vietnam

1 November 1972 Vietnam Independence Cup	Singapore	3–1	Malaysia	South Vietnam

18 November 1972 King's Cup	Thailand	4–0	Singapore	Thailand

20 November 1972 King's Cup	Singapore	2–1	Indonesia	Thailand

22 November 1972 King's Cup	Malaysia	2–0	Singapore	Thailand

24 November 1972 King's Cup	South Korea	2–0	Singapore	Thailand

28 November 1972 King's Cup	Singapore	0–0	South Korea	Thailand

=== 1973 ===
26 July 1973 Merdeka Tournament	Khmer Republic	1–1	Singapore	Malaysia

28 July 1973 Merdeka Tournament	Kuwait	2–0	Singapore	Malaysia

30 July 1973 Merdeka Tournament	Burma	1–0	Singapore	Malaysia

2 August 1973 Merdeka Tournament	Bangladesh	1–1	Singapore	Malaysia
	Salahuddin 6'	Report	Krishnan 20'	Stadium: Stadium Merdeka; Referee: Koh Guan Kiat (Malaysia)

5 August 1973 Merdeka Tournament	South Vietnam	1–0	Singapore	Malaysia

10 August 1973 Merdeka Tournament	Singapore	3–0	Khmer Republic	Malaysia

13 August 1973 Friendly tournament	Singapore	0–1	Bangladesh	Singapore
		Report	Nowsheruzzaman 69'	Stadium: National Stadium

15 August 1973 Friendly tournament	Singapore	4–5	India	Singapore

1 September 1973 1973 Southeast Asian Peninsular Games	Singapore	1–0	Thailand	Singapore
	Thinakorn Patcharoen 28' (o.g.)			Stadium: National Stadium

4 September 1973 1973 Southeast Asian Peninsular Games	Singapore	0–0	Malaysia	Singapore
				Stadium: National Stadium

6 September 1973 1973 Southeast Asian Peninsular Games	Singapore	1–1 (a.e.t.) (3–5 p)	South Vietnam	Singapore
	Quah Kim Lye 61'		Cu Sinh 63'	Stadium: National Stadium
	Penalties
	Seak Poh Leong (penalty missed); Muhammad Noh Hussein (penalty scored); Jafar Yacoob (penalty scored); Dollah Kassim (penalty scored); M. Kumar (penalty missed)		(penalty scored) Nguyen Van Tha; (penalty scored) Cu Sinh; (penalty scored) Hyunh Van Chiew; (penalty scored) Nguyen Vin Quan; (penalty scored) Le Van Tu

7 September 1973 1973 Southeast Asian Peninsular Games	Singapore	0–3	Malaysia	Singapore
			Reduan Abdullah 6'; Mokhtar Dahari 34'; R.Visvanathan 84'	Stadium: National Stadium

3 November 1973 Vietnam Independence Cup	Malaysia	2–1	Singapore	South Vietnam

4 November 1973 Vietnam Independence Cup	South Vietnam	4–2	Singapore	South Vietnam

15 December 1973 King's Cup	Laos	3–2	Singapore	Thailand

17 December 1973 King's Cup	Burma	6–1	Singapore	Thailand

19 December 1973 King's Cup	Thailand	3–0	Singapore	Thailand

=== 1974 ===
12 February 1974 Friendly	Singapore	0–1	Japan	Singapore

28 July 1974 Merdeka Tournament	Indonesia	5–0	Singapore	Malaysia

30 July 1974 Merdeka Tournament	Singapore	1–1	Thailand	Malaysia

7 August 1974 Friendly	Singapore	0–1	Hong Kong	Singapore

3 November 1974 Friendly	Singapore	1–1	China	Singapore

10 December 1974 King's Cup	Singapore	2–0	Laos	Thailand

12 December 1974 King's Cup	Malaysia	0–0	Singapore	Thailand

14 December 1974 King's Cup	Thailand	2–1	Singapore	Thailand

=== 1975 ===
2 May 1975 Friendly	China	1–0	Singapore	China

15 June 1975 1976 AFC Asian Cup qualification	Singapore	6–0	Brunei	Hong Kong

19 June 1975 1976 AFC Asian Cup qualification	North Korea	1–0	Singapore	Hong Kong

21 June 1975 1976 AFC Asian Cup qualification	Japan	2–1	Singapore	Hong Kong

9 November 1975 Friendly	Singapore	2–2	New Zealand	Singapore

10 December 1975 1975 Southeast Asian Peninsular Games	Burma	1–0	Singapore	Bangkok, Thailand
				Stadium: Supachalasai Stadium

12 December 1975 1975 Southeast Asian Peninsular Games	Thailand	2–2 (a.e.t.)	Singapore	Bangkok, Thailand
				Stadium: Supachalasai Stadium

15 December 1975 1975 Southeast Asian Peninsular Games	Burma	2–2 (a.e.t.)	Singapore	Bangkok, Thailand
				Stadium: Supachalasai Stadium

21 December 1975 King's Cup	Malaysia	0–0	Singapore	Thailand

24 December 1975 King's Cup	Burma	6–0	Singapore	Thailand

26 December 1975 King's Cup	Thailand	0–1	Singapore	Thailand

30 December 1975 King's Cup	South Korea	5–0	Singapore	Thailand

=== 1976 ===
15 February 1976	Indonesia	0–0	Singapore

20 February 1976	Singapore	7–4	Papua New Guinea

22 February 1976	Malaysia	6–0	Singapore

24 February 1976	North Korea	2–0	Singapore

13 September 1976	Malaysia	4–1	Singapore

15 September 1976	Singapore	2–1	India

17 September 1976	South Korea	7–0	Singapore

22 October 1976	Singapore	0–1	Australia

17 December 1976	South Korea	4–0	Singapore

19 December 1976	Thailand	6–0	Singapore

=== 1977 ===
14 February 1977	Singapore	0–4	South Korea

27 February 1977	Singapore	2–0	Thailand

2 March 1977	Singapore	2–2	Hong Kong

6 March 1977	Singapore	1–0	Malaysia

9 March 1977	Singapore	0–4	Indonesia

12 March 1977	Singapore	0–1	Hong Kong

28 October 1977	Thailand	2–0	Singapore

1 November 1977	Malaysia	4–3	Singapore

4 November 1977	India	2–1	Singapore

13 November 1977	Singapore	0–2	Australia

20 November 1977	Thailand	2–0	Singapore

21 November 1977	Burma	5–1	Singapore

=== 1978 ===
April 1978	Singapore	1–0	Malaysia

May 1978	Malaysia	3–2	Singapore

14 June 1978	South Korea	3–1	Singapore

16 June 1978	Malaysia	1–1	Singapore

17 June 1978	Thailand	3–1	Singapore

21 June 1978	Indonesia	2–2	Singapore

14 July 1978	Malaysia	6–0	Singapore

16 July 1978	South Korea	2–0	Singapore

18 July 1978	Thailand	2–1	Singapore

20 July 1978	Iraq	3–0	Singapore

23 July 1978	Singapore	2–1	Japan

25 July 1978	Singapore	4–1	Syria

27 July 1978	Indonesia	0–0	Singapore

1 October 1978	Singapore	0–2	New Zealand

=== 1979 ===
4 May 1979	Hong Kong	3–1	Singapore

6 May 1979	Thailand	4–0	Singapore

8 May 1979	Sri Lanka	4–0	Singapore

30 June 1979	Indonesia	0–0	Singapore

5 July 1979	Singapore	1–1	Thailand

9 July 1979	Malaysia	3–0	Singapore

11 July 1979	Burma	4–1	Singapore

13 July 1979	Japan	3–1	Singapore

22 September 1979	Indonesia	3–0	Singapore

23 September 1979	Malaysia	2–0	Singapore

25 September 1979	Singapore	2–2	Thailand

26 September 1979	Singapore	2–1	Burma

17 November 1979	Singapore	0–5	Sweden

25 November 1979	Singapore	4–0	Malaysia

=== 1980 ===
23 February 1980	Singapore	3–0	Sri Lanka

26 February 1980	Singapore	1–0	India

1 March 1980	Singapore	0–3	Iran

4 March 1980	Singapore	3–1	North Korea

8 March 1980	Singapore	1–0	China

12 March 1980	Singapore	0–4	Iran

20 November 1980	Singapore	3–0	Brunei

22 December 1980	Japan	1–0	Singapore

24 December 1980	Hong Kong	1–1	Singapore

26 December 1980	North Korea	1–0	Singapore

=== 1981 ===
17 February 1981	Singapore	0–1	Japan

19 February 1981	Singapore	0–0	Japan

24 February 1981	Singapore	1–1	Saudi Arabia

5 April 1981	Singapore	1–1	Malaysia

17 April 1981	Malaysia	1–2	Singapore

1 September 1981	Thailand	3–1	Singapore

4 September 1981	South Korea	2–0	Singapore

16 September 1981	Iraq	4–0	Singapore

9 November 1981 King's Cup	Thailand	2–1	Singapore	Thailand

11 November 1981 King's Cup	Singapore	1–0	Malaysia	Thailand

17 November 1981 King's Cup	Pakistan	1–0	Singapore	Thailand

7 December 1981 1981 Southeast Asian Games	Indonesia	1–0	Singapore	Pasig, Philippines

9 December 1981 1981 Southeast Asian Games	Singapore	4–0	Philippines	Pasig, Philippines

13 December 1981 1981 Southeast Asian Games	Malaysia	1–1 (5–4 p)	Singapore	Pasig, Philippines

14 December 1981 1981 Southeast Asian Games	Indonesia	2–0	Singapore	Pasig, Philippines

=== 1982 ===
17 January 1982 Friendly	Singapore	2–0	Bahrain	Singapore

10 March 1982 Friendly	United Arab Emirates	3–0	Singapore	United Arab Emirates

12 March 1982 Friendly	United Arab Emirates	5–3	Singapore	United Arab Emirates

1 May 1982 King's Cup 1982	Thailand	1–1	Singapore	Bangkok, Thailand
		Report

3 May 1982 King's Cup 1982	Tianjin (China)	1–1	Singapore	Bangkok, Thailand
		Report

5 May 1982 King's Cup 1982	Singapore	2–0	Nepal	Bangkok, Thailand
		Report

6 May 1982 King's Cup 1982	Singapore	1–0	Philippines	Bangkok, Thailand
		Report

10 May 1982 King's Cup 1982	Singapore	2–1	(China) Tianjin	Bangkok, Thailand
		Report

11 May 1982 King's Cup 1982	Singapore	1–1	Thailand B	Bangkok, Thailand
		Report

13 May 1982 King's Cup 1982	Thailand	1–0	Singapore	Bangkok, Thailand
		Report

15 May 1982 King's Cup 1982	Singapore	2–2	Thailand	Bangkok, Thailand
		Report

17 May 1982 King's Cup 1982	Thailand B	2–2 (Note: No extra time was played. The score is also reported as 0–0, 5–4 pen.) (3–2 p)	Singapore	Bangkok, Thailand
		Report

30 May 1982 Kirin Cup 1982	Nippon Kokan (Japan)	1–1	Singapore	Japan

2 June 1982 Kirin Cup 1982	Japan	2–0	Singapore	Japan

4 June 1982 Kirin Cup 1982	Singapore	1–6	(Germany) Werder Bremen	Japan

6 June 1982 Kirin Cup 1982	Singapore	1–5	(Netherlands) Feyenoord	Japan

7 August 1982 Merdeka Tournament	Ghana	3–0	Singapore	Kuala Lumpur, Malaysia
		Report

10 August 1982 Merdeka Tournament	Santa Catarina XI (Brazil)	4–1	Singapore	Kuala Lumpur, Malaysia
		Report

12 August 1982 Merdeka Tournament	India	0–3	Singapore	Kuala Lumpur, Malaysia
		Report

14 August 1982 Merdeka Tournament	Singapore	2–0	Thailand	Kuala Lumpur, Malaysia
		Report

5 October 1982 Merlion Cup 1982	Singapore	0–1	Malaysia	Singapore

7 October 1982 Merlion Cup 1982	Singapore	7–0	Brunei	Singapore

10 October 1982 Merlion Cup 1982	Singapore	0–2	South Korea	Singapore

=== 1983 ===
28 May 1983 1983 Southeast Asian Games	Singapore	2–1	Malaysia	Singapore
	Fandi Ahmad 7'; V. Sundramoorthy 47'		Chen Wooi Haw 20'	Stadium: National Stadium

1 June 1983 1983 Southeast Asian Games	Singapore	5–0	Philippines	Singapore
	Fandi Ahmad 2'; Salim Moin 32' 52' 64' 76'			Stadium: National Stadium

4 June 1983 1983 Southeast Asian Games	Singapore	4–0	Brunei	Singapore
	Fandi Ahmad 8' 35'; Amin Sariman 23'; Salim Moin 82'			Stadium: National Stadium

6 June 1983 1983 Southeast Asian Games	Singapore	1–2	Thailand	Singapore
	Au Yeong Pak Kuan 79' (pen.)		Piyapong Pue-on 10'; Chalor Hongkajohn 38'	Stadium: National Stadium

14 October 1983 Olympic Games qualifier	Singapore	0–3	Saudi Arabia	Singapore

17 October 1983 Olympic Games qualifier	Singapore	2–1	India	Singapore

20 October 1983 Olympic Games qualifier	Singapore	0–2	Malaysia	Singapore

23 October 1983 Olympic Games qualifier	Singapore	1–0	India	Singapore

26 October 1983 Olympic Games qualifier	Indonesia	1–1	Singapore	Malaysia

29 October 1983 Olympic Games qualifier	India	1–0	Singapore	Malaysia

1 November 1983 Olympic Games qualifier	Malaysia	1–0	Singapore	Malaysia

17 November 1983 Olympic Games qualifier	Saudi Arabia	5–0	Singapore	Saudi Arabia

3 December 1983 Merlion Cup 1983	Singapore	5–0	Indonesia	Singapore

7 December 1983 Merlion Cup 1983	Singapore	4–0	Brunei	Singapore

9 December 1983 Merlion Cup 1983	Singapore	2–4	South Korea U23	Singapore

14 December 1983 Merlion Cup 1983	Singapore	1–0	China	Singapore

18 December 1983 Merlion Cup 1983	Singapore	2–4	Australia	Singapore

=== 1984 ===
12 August 1984	Malaysia	1–0	Singapore

18 August 1984	Singapore	0–0	Malaysia

4 September 1984	Singapore	0–1	Qatar

22 October 1984	Singapore	5–1	Indonesia

5 November 1984	Qatar	0–0	Singapore

7 November 1984	Qatar	3–1	Singapore

2 December 1984	Singapore	2–0	India

5 December 1984	Singapore	0–2	China

8 December 1984	Singapore	0–1	United Arab Emirates

10 December 1984	Singapore	1–1	Iran

=== 1985 ===
4 January 1985 Friendly	Brunei	0–0	Singapore	Brunei

19 January 1985 1986 World Cup qualification	Singapore	1–1	North Korea	Singapore

23 February 1985 1986 World Cup qualification	Singapore	1–3	Japan	Singapore

18 May 1985 1986 World Cup qualification	Japan	5–0	Singapore	Tokyo, Japan

25 May 1985 1986 World Cup qualification	North Korea	2–0	Singapore	Pyongyang, North Korea

12 October 1985 Merlion Cup 1985	Singapore	2–0	(Germany) Eintracht Frankfurt	Singapore

14 October 1985 Merlion Cup 1985	Singapore	0–2	Yugoslavia Youth	Singapore

16 October 1985 Merlion Cup 1985	Singapore	2–1	Brunei	Singapore

18 October 1985 Merlion Cup 1985	Singapore	4–0	Indonesia B	Singapore

20 October 1985 Merlion Cup 1985	Singapore	2–0	Malaysia	Singapore

23 October 1985 Merlion Cup 1985	Singapore	4–0	Malaysia	Singapore

26 October 1985 Merlion Cup 1985	Singapore	1–1	Yugoslavia Youth	Singapore

9 December 1985 1985 Southeast Asian Games	Singapore	1–0	Indonesia	Thailand

13 December 1985 1985 Southeast Asian Games	Singapore	3–0	Brunei	Thailand

14 December 1985 1985 Southeast Asian Games	Malaysia	2–2	Singapore	Thailand

17 December 1985 1985 Southeast Asian Games	Thailand	2–0	Singapore	Thailand

=== 1986 ===
1 March 1986 1986 King's Cup	Indonesia	3–1	Singapore	Thailand

3 March 1986 1986 King's Cup	Thailand	3–1	Singapore	Thailand

5 March 1986 1986 King's Cup	August 1st (China)	3–1	Singapore	Thailand

24 August 1986 Merlion Tournament	Singapore	0–1	Singapore	Singapore

30 August 1986 Merlion Tournament	Singapore	0–2	North Korea	Singapore

1 September 1986 Merlion Tournament	Singapore	0–3	China	Singapore

3 September 1986 Merlion Tournament	Singapore	1–2	China	Singapore

6 September 1986 Merlion Tournament	Singapore	0–1	Canada	Singapore

7 September 1986 Friendly	Singapore	0–4	Saudi Arabia	Singapore

2 December 1986 Friendly tournament	Nepal	0–0	Singapore	Nepal

7 December 1986 Friendly tournament	Bangladesh	1–1	Singapore	Nepal

=== 1987 ===
4 April 1987 Olympic Games qualifier	Singapore	2–0	Indonesia	Singapore

12 April 1987 Olympic Games qualifier	Japan	1–0	Singapore	Japan

26 April 1987 Olympic Games qualifier	Indonesia	2–1	Singapore	Indonesia

14 June 1987 Olympic Games qualifier	Singapore	0–1	Japan	Singapore

10 September 1987 1987 Southeast Asian Games	Malaysia	0–0	Singapore	Jakarta, Indonesia
				Stadium: Senayan Stadium

14 September 1987 1987 Southeast Asian Games	Burma	0–0	Singapore	Jakarta, Indonesia
				Stadium: Senayan Stadium

=== 1988 ===
9 October 1988 Friendly	Malaysia	0–1	Qatar	Singapore

27 November 1988 Friendly	Singapore	2–3	Malaysia	Singapore

December 1988 Merdeka Tournament	Singapore	1–2	(Germany) Hamburger SV	Kuala Lumpur, Malaysia

December 1988 Merdeka Tournament	Singapore	0–2	(Austria) FC Tirol	Kuala Lumpur, Malaysia

9 December 1988 Merdeka Tournament	Singapore	3–1	Oman	Kuala Lumpur, Malaysia

=== 1989 ===
13 May 1989 Friendly	Singapore	1–2	Indonesia	Singapore

23 May 1989 1990 World Cup qualification	South Korea	3–0	Singapore	South Korea

25 May 1989 1990 World Cup qualification	Malaysia	1–0	Singapore	South Korea

27 May 1989 1990 World Cup qualification	Singapore	3–0	Nepal	South Korea

3 June 1989 1990 World Cup qualification	Singapore	2–2	Malaysia	Singapore

5 June 1989 1990 World Cup qualification	Singapore	7–0	Nepal	Singapore

7 June 1989 1990 World Cup qualification	Singapore	0–3	South Korea	Singapore

24 August 1989 1989 Southeast Asian Games	Singapore	1–1	Thailand	Kuala Lumpur, Malaysia

26 August 1989 1989 Southeast Asian Games	Singapore	4–0	Burma	Kuala Lumpur, Malaysia

28 August 1989 1989 Southeast Asian Games	Singapore	1–0	Indonesia	Kuala Lumpur, Malaysia

31 August 1989 1989 Southeast Asian Games	Malaysia	3–1	Singapore	Kuala Lumpur, Malaysia
