= Kallang Roar the Movie =

- Kallang Roar the Movie
- Directed by: Cheng Ding An
- Written by: Cheng Ding An
- Produced by: Tay Hoo Wee
- Starring: Lim Kay Siu; Leon Quah; Randall Tan; Melvinder Kanth; Anwar Hadi; Baskar Subramanian; Rei Poh; Ezaad; Tan Rui Xiang; Wu Chean; Mohd Faizal; Sharul; Santhanaram Jayaram; Adam Lau; Mohamad Hazriq Idrus; Mohammed Eshaan; Julie Katherina
- Cinematography: David Foo
- Edited by: Yim Mun Chong
- Music by: Denny Lin
- Distributed by: Shaw Organisation
- Release date: 21 August 2008
- Country: Singapore
- Language: English
- Budget: $1 million

Kallang Roar the Movie is a 2008 sports film on Singapore national football team’s legendary coach Choo Seng Quee (played by Lim Kay Siu). The film shows the events leading up to Singapore winning the Malaysia Cup in 1977, including the epic semi-final match against Selangor and the final against Penang.

== Cast ==
- Lim Kay Siu as Choo Seng Quee
- Ram, Santhanaram Jayaram as Nadesan Ganesan
- Leon Quah Hsun Chuen as Quah Kim Song
  - Leon Quah is the son of Quah Kim Song and he plays the role of his father in the movie.
- Anwar Hadi Bin Ramli as Dollah Kassim
- Randall Tan as Mat Noh
- Baskar Subramanian as S. Rajagopal
- Melvinder Kanth as Samad Allapitchay
- Mohd Ezaad bin Abdullah as Nasir Jalil
- Rei Poh Cheng Leong as Edmund Wee
- Mohamad Sharul bin Abdul Latib as Zainal Abidin
- Mohammed Yazri Bin Ya'akob as Hasli Ibrahim
- Tan Rui Xiang as Robert Sim
- Thavakumaran Ravintharan M.P. as V. Khanison
- Mohd Faizal bin Mohd Fadil as Sayed Mutalib
- Mohamed Rahmat bin Reme as M. Kumar
- Lee Wu Chean as Lim Tong Sai
- Ng Chi Wee as Lim Chew Peng
- Mohammed Eshaan Bin Mohammed Ezaad as Samad Allapitchay's son
- Julie Katherina as Samad Allapitchay's wife

== Production ==
Merlion Pictures started filming for the movie on February 29, 2008. Filming took place at the historic Kallang National Stadium where some of the matches had taken place. Filming also took place at the Jurong Stadium which was used as a substitute for the Merdeka Stadium as the latter was by then no longer being used for sporting events.

The trailer and teaser were released on the 26 June 2008.

Director Cheng Ding An said research for the film took three years and it would cost about S$1 million to produce the movie. The film was eventually released on August 21, 2008.

=== Historical inaccuracies ===
In the opening scene set in 1967, Tunku Abdul Rahman was seen trying to desuade Choo from returning to Singapore. Choo had in fact left the Football Association of Malaysia in September 1964 and had been coaching for Singapore since June 1964.

During the coach interview scene that was set in 1967, one of the Council members mentioned that twelve years had passed since Singapore last won the Malaysia Cup. Choo had actually coached Singapore to the 1965 title and would repeat that feat twelve years later, in 1977.

Although he had offered his services to coach Singapore for free previously, Choo was by 1965 a paid coach employed by the Football Association of Singapore.

Samad Allapitchay was depicted as a young boy when he first encountered Choo but Samad was born in 1950, and was 17 years old in 1967. Similarly, Quah Kim Song was 15, Mat Noh, 13 and Dollah Kassim, 18.

In the movie, Choo was finally offered the coaching position ten years later in 1977. In real life, that was Choo's 4th stint with the Singapore team, and he was appointed in September 1976 following Nadesan Ganesan's election as FAS chairman.

Trevor Hartley, Hussein Aljunied and Andrew Yap resigned after Choo's appointment while the trio withheld their resignations after meeting Ganesan in the movie.
