= Ghost on Air =

2012 Singaporean supernatural film

- The poster
- Directed by: Cheng Ding An
- Written by: Cheng Ding An; Dennis Chew
- Produced by: Tay Hoo Wee
- Starring: Dennis Chew; Gan Mei Yan; Eunice Olsen; Rei Poh; Samuel Chong; Sheena Chan
- Cinematography: Lim Beng Huat
- Edited by: WideScreen Media
- Music by: Ken Chong
- Distributed by: Shaw Organisation
- Release date: 17 May 2012
- Country: Singapore
- Language: Mandarin
- Budget: $1 Million
- Box office: $800 Thousand

Ghost on Air is a 2012 Singaporean horror film directed by Cheng Ding An and starred Y.E.S. 93.3FM deejay Dennis Chew. The film is released island-wide in Singapore on 17 May 2012 and released in Malaysia in June 2012.

== Plot ==
Ping Xiao is a popular radio DJ who had been nominated for the "Most Popular Male DJ" award nine times, winning two of them, and is expected to win the tenth nomination. However, when Ping Xiao is caught in a scandal in which he harasses a female patron of a bar while drunk, thinking that she is his deceased horror novelist girlfriend, Jia Li, he is demoted by his boss to host the late-night show, the "Ghost on Air", to save face, while his post is temporarily replaced by a young female host, Pauline. Thinking that Pauline is plotting to deny him his award, he acts cold to her, though she is genuinely worried for his deteriorating condition. As the host of the late-night show, Ping Xiao's job is to tell ghost stories to his audience, most of which he samples from those gathered by Jia Li. Jia Li had left several video detailing her researches to Ping Xiao before her sudden death a month later.

Throughout his experiences, Ping Xiao becomes haunted by the ghosts of the stories, which turn out to be real. One of the stories recounts the life of Jia Li's friend, Ya Ru, who disappeared for six months before suddenly returning, only to reveal that she is pregnant. She aborted the fetus, but felt that her unborn child is haunting her for aborting him. Ya Ru later committed suicide. Through Jia Li's mother, Ping Xiao visits Shophouse 14 boarding house, where a middle school student, Ai Xi, had committed suicide. After several nights, Ping Xiao discovers that the mean landlady, Mang Pao, has been hiding her son, Ya Nan, who had assaulted Ai Xi. He reports this to the authorities and recovers his status, ultimately winning the DJ award. The hauntings of the boarding house, though, has made him cold and distant.

After returning from the award celebration, Ping Xiao views the last video recorded by Jia Li, in which she, having returned from doing research in Shophouse 14, became terrified of the hauntings that she experienced, culminating in her death. Ping Xiao turns back and screams when he sees all the ghosts of the stories menacing him, suggesting that he will share Jia Li's fate.

== Cast ==
- Dennis Chew as Ping Xiao, a popular radio personality who has fallen from grace after a public scandal
- Gan Mei Yan as Jia Li, Ping Xiao's late girlfriend
- Samuel Chong as Albert, Ping Xiao's superior
- Eunice Olsen as Pauline, rival radio DJ to Ping Xiao
- Zhu Xiufeng as Mang Po, owner of Shophouse 14
- Rei Poh as Ya Nan, son of Mang Po
- Sheena Chan as Ya Ru, Jia Li's best friend
- William Lawandi as Guo Ming, fellow DJ
- Clarissa Kok as Nana, fellow DJ
- Lee Shan Hui as Ai Xi, a 14-year-old deceased schoolgirl

== Reception ==
Moviexclusive said of the film, "In all, Ghost On Air, due to its inexperienced cast and crew, is certainly not on par with the standard of a locally produced movie."
