= Anwar Hadi =

Singaporean actor

Anwar Hadi Ramli
- Born: March 28, 1980 (age 46); Singapore
- Occupation: Actor

Anwar Hadi Ramli is a playwright and actor who has appeared in several TV films and theatre productions since 2000. He appeared in the 2008 Kallang Roar the Movie as Gelek King Dollah Kassim in Singapore national football team of the 1970s. He is currently working in theatre. In 2017, his play, The (Assumed) Vicious Cycle of a (Melayu) Youth, won the Best Theatre Script at the Anugerah Persuratan (Malay Literary Awards) by the Malay Language Council of Singapore.

== Filmography ==
- Kallang Roar the Movie (2008) .... Dollah Kassim
- Blood Ties (2009) .... Nazri

== Theatre ==
- Keris Sempana Daik (2003) .... Majlis Pusat Teater Titisan
- Hikayat Hang Tuah (2003) .... Teater Kami Ltd
- Awang Batil (2003) .... Teater Kami Ltd
- NSMen Life! (2003) .... Teater Kami Ltd
- VIA 3 Dramatic reading (2004) .... Teater Ekamatra
- Lelaki 9 Akal 1 Nafsu (2004) .... Teater Kami Ltd
- Ainul Jauhara (2004) .... Majlis Pusat – Teater Titisan
- Psikosis (2004) .... Teater Kami Ltd
- VIA 4 Dramatic reading (2004) .... Teater Ekamatra
- Mat Rock Minah Kental (2004) .... Teater Kami Ltd
- Kelab Dangdut (2005) .... Teater Kami Ltd
- Puteri Saadong (2005) .... Teater Kami Ltd
- VIA 5 Dramatic reading (2005) .... Teater Ekamatra
- Horlick Milo Kopi Teh (2005) .... Teater Kami Ltd
- Rock Opera the Musical (2006) .... IMG Promotions
- Bicara (2006) .... Teater Artistik
- VIA 7 Dramatic reading (2006) .... Teater Ekamatra
- Tekong Highway (200) .... Teater Kami Ltd
- Mat Champion the Musical (2007) .... Teater Ekamatra
- Al-Kisah Jakun dan Tengek (2007) .... Teater Kami Ltd
- Gentarasa Titisan Cacamerba (2007) .... MESRA
- Balada Tun Fatimah (2007) .... Teater Kami Ltd
- Adventures of Han and Geet (2007) .... Act3 Theatrics
- Wayang Betul..Lah (2007) .... Teater Kami Ltd
- Campur Satu (2007) .... Teater Kami Ltd
- Awang Batil (2008) .... ACJC
- Robinson Crusoe (2008) .... Act3 Theatrics
- Treasury of Singapore Tales (2008) .... Act3 Theatrics
- Love Story of Romzi and Juleha (2008) .... Teater Kami Ltd
- Badang Returns (2008) .... Teater Kami Ltd
- Sidang Burung (2008) .... Teater Ekamatra
- The Assumed Vicious Cycle of a Malay Youth (TVCY) (2016) ... Pentas Karyawan
- Claustrophobia (2017) ... Pentas Karyawan
- Mahameru (2018) ... Pentas Karyawan
- Kurun Yang Hilang (2019) ... Pentas Karyawan
