= Melvinder Kanth =

Singaporean documentary filmmaker and actor

- Born: Singapore
- Occupation: Actor
- Awards: Life! Theatre Awards 2002 (Best Supporting Actor), Singapore Film Festival 2002 Digital Film Award (In Search Of Afghanistan).

Melvinder Kanth is a documentary film-maker and actor who has appeared in several TV films and theatre in the United Kingdom and Singapore since 1996. He appeared in 2008's Kallang Roar the Movie as Captain of the Legendary Singapore national football team of the 1970s. Kanth trained at the Bristol Old Vic Theatre School in England.

== Filmography ==
- In Search of the Penan (1999)
- In Search of Afghanistan (2001)
- 1988..Segaris Sinar (2008) ... Mail
- Kallang Roar the Movie (2008) .... Samad Allapitchay
