= National Stadium, Singapore (1973–2010) =

Demolished stadium in Singapore

Coordinates: 1°18′15.4″N 103°52′28.6″E

Singapore National Stadium
- Kallang Stadium
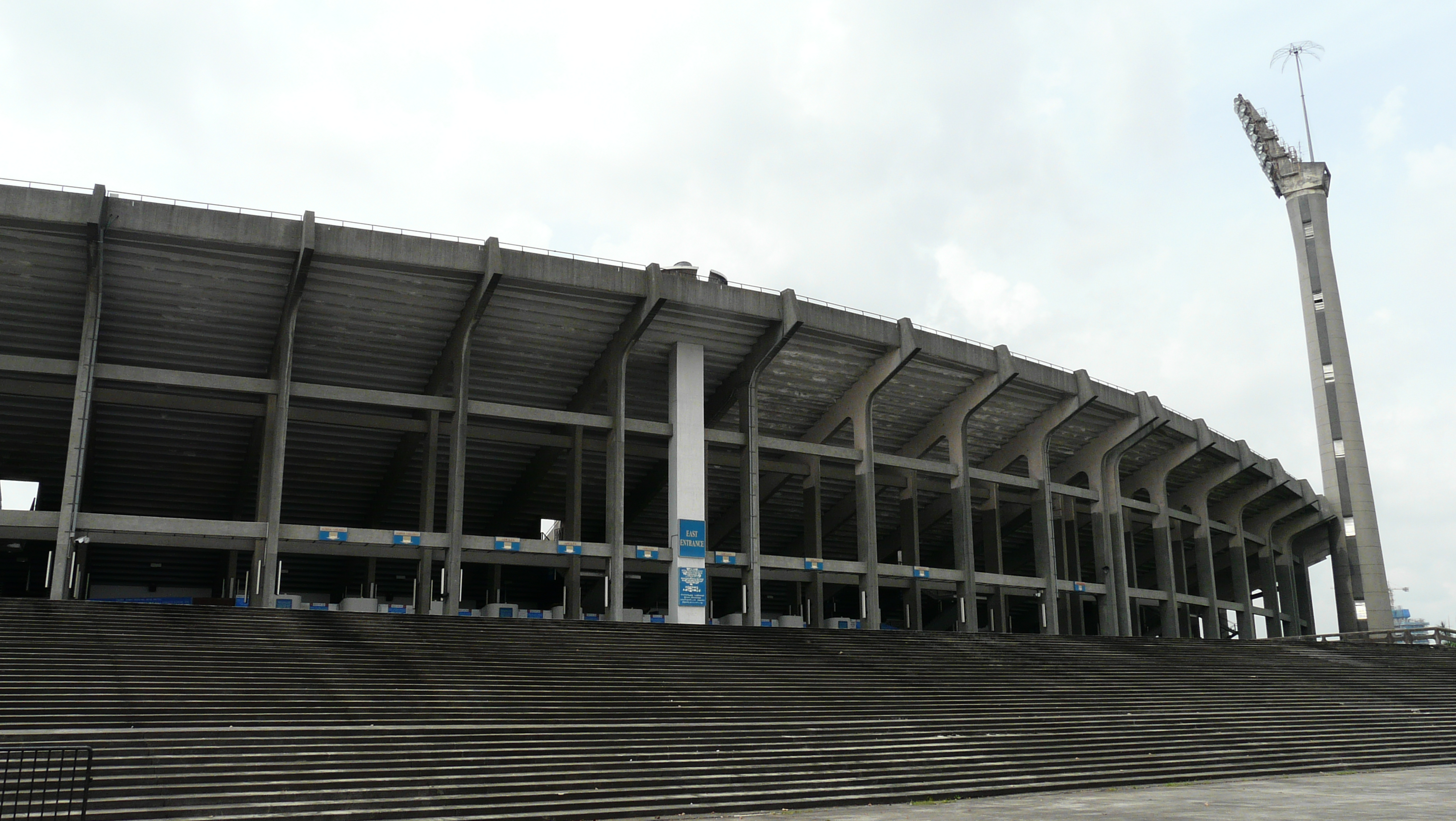
- Former National Stadium, Singapore

- Location within Singapore
- Full name: Singapore National Stadium
- Address: 15 Stadium Road, Singapore 397718
- Location: Kallang, Singapore
- Owner: Singapore Sports Council
- Operator: Singapore Sports Council
- Capacity: 55,000
- Surface: Grass

Construction
- Groundbreaking: 1966; 60 years ago
- Opened: 21 July 1973; 53 years ago
- Closed: 30 June 2007; 19 years ago
- Demolished: February 2011; 15 years ago

Tenants
- Singapore national football team (1973–2007); Singapore FA (1973–1994)

The former Singapore National Stadium was a multi-purpose stadium in Kallang, which opened in July 1973 and closed on 30 June 2007. The stadium was demolished from 2010 to 2011 for the development of the Singapore Sports Hub, which houses its successor. During its closure from 2007 to 2014, the National Day Parade (NDP) and sports events were held at the Marina Bay Floating Platform and Jalan Besar Stadium.

The stadium was prominently the home of Singapore FA, a club side, and the Singapore national team. It also hosted the Singapore Cup finals annually, the first in 1996, and the second leg of the 2004 AFF Championship finals.

In addition to association football matches, the stadium hosted the 1973, 1983 and 1993 Southeast Asian Games, the Singapore Armed Forces day parades and the opening ceremony of the biennial Singapore Youth Festival, as well as numerous music and cultural events. It was the primary venue for the NDP.

== History ==
=== Conceptualisation ===
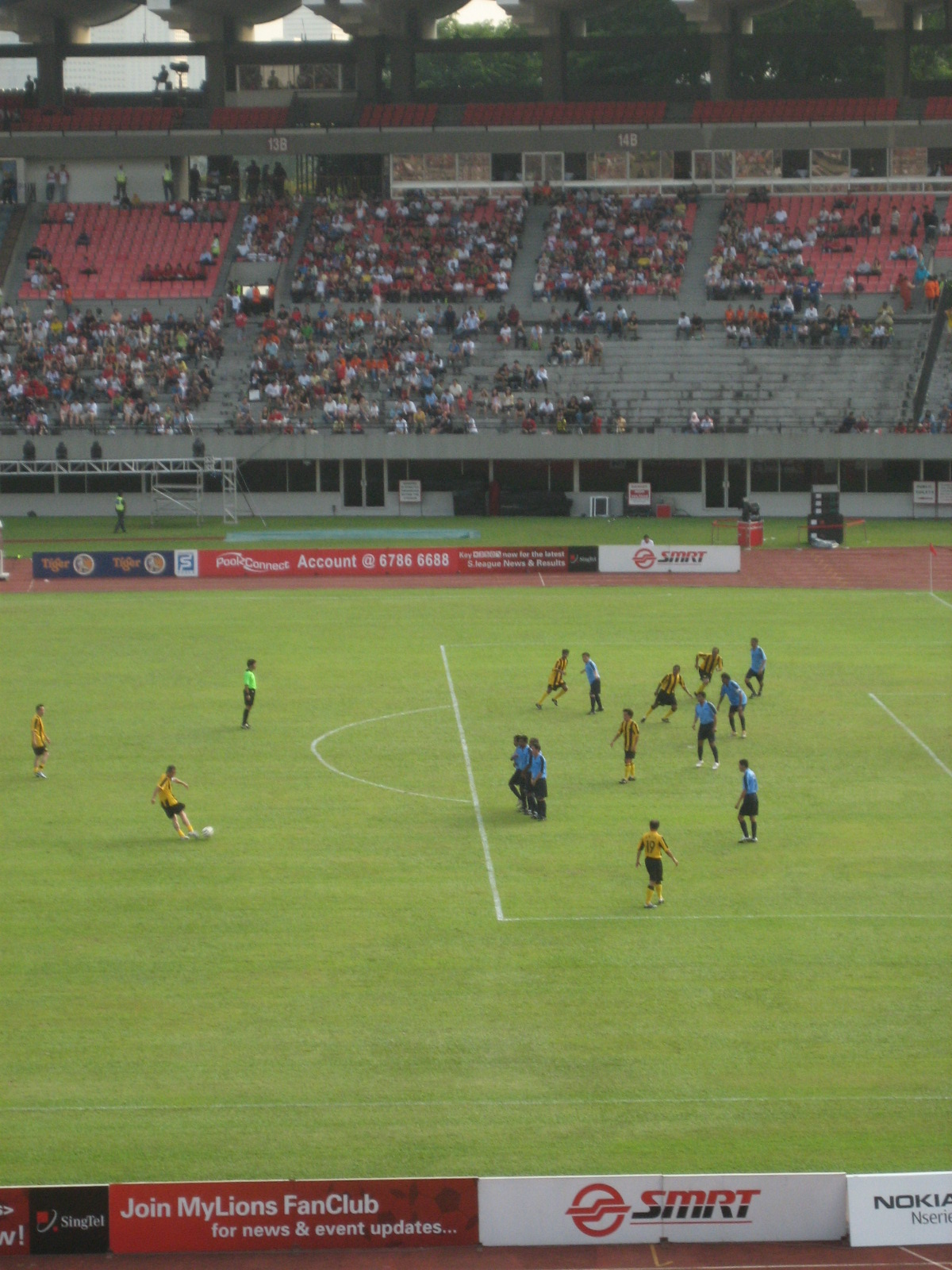
One of the final football games played at Kallang, June 2007

Shortly after the Second World War, as Singapore moved towards self-government and independence, the call for a national stadium began.

=== Planning ===
In June 1963, the Singapore government announced plans to build a national stadium in Kallang Park, and a 19-member committee was formed to oversee planning and fund-raising for the project. Comprising two outdoor stadiums, a covered stadium, and a swimming complex, and intended to be large enough to host the South East Asia Peninsular Games, the stadium was expected to cost S$16 million.

As part of the planning process, the Public Works Department's chief architect, Tan Beng Kiat, studied several stadiums overseas. In March 1966, then-Minister for Law and National Development E.W Barker announced that the stadium's development was of top priority in the government's infrastructure development plan, and that the main stadium would be developed first. Expected to cost between S$20 million and S$25 million, the main stadium was to have a capacity of 50,000.

A state-owned lottery company, Singapore Pools, was set up in 1968 to raise funds for the stadium. Proceeds from the Singapore Sweep and TOTO were used to pay a substantial part of the construction bill. Between 1968 and 1976, the company contributed S$14.5 million towards the project. Singapore Pools also helped the stadium repay a government loan of $7.8 million meant as start-up money for a stadium management corporation. Following the completion of the National Stadium, Singapore Pools remained a major sponsor of the stadium, as well as the National Day Parade.

=== Construction ===
Construction of the stadium began in December 1966, and the groundbreaking ceremony was officiated by then-Minister of Social Affairs Othman Wok. The foundations were completed by February 1970, and the stadium's foundation stone was laid on 23 February. By the end of 1970, the stadium was three-quarters completed and was starting to take its definitive shape. Thirty-six steps, each 76 metres (249 ft) wide, formed an impressive entrance; and a cauldron was built within the stadium to carry a flame that would burn at special events and at the opening of the stadium. By the end of June 1973 when the stadium was completed, 300,000 bags of cement, 3,000,000 bricks and 4,500 tons of steel and timber had been used. The new stadium was opened to the public for the first time on 19 July 1973.

=== Redevelopment ===
Plans were made to demolish the stadium and build a multipurpose, 35.6 hectares (88 acres) Singapore Sports Hub in its place. Demolition works began in the second half of 2007, and the new Sports Hub was eventually completed in 2014. Three finalist consortia submitted redevelopment plans.

The 2007 ASEAN Football Championship was the last major event held at the National Stadium before its redevelopment.

=== Closure ===
On 30 June 2007, a closing ceremony titled Field of Dreams – A Tribute to the National Stadium was held at the stadium. 45,000 people attended the event, together with President S R Nathan, members of the Cabinet and Singapore athletes, past and present. Before the ceremony, a football match featuring ex-internationals from Singapore and Malaysia like Quah Kim Song, Terry Pathmanathan, Samat Allapitchay, V. Sundramoorthy, David Lee, Dollah Kassim, Soh Chin Aun, Santokh Singh, Chow Siew Wai and K. Gunalan was played.

The match was followed by the highlight of the evening, an international friendly between ASEAN champions Singapore and the Asian Cup bound Australian team, the Socceroos. The Australians won 3–0 with goals scored by English Premier League players Mark Viduka (50, 86 mins) and Harry Kewell (75 min).

This was not the last football match to be played in the stadium as it was subsequently used for 11 football matches. The very last goal scored at the stadium was scored by Gholamreza Rezaei of Iran in a 1–3 loss for the hosts against the Iranian national team in an Asian Cup qualifying match on 6 January 2010.

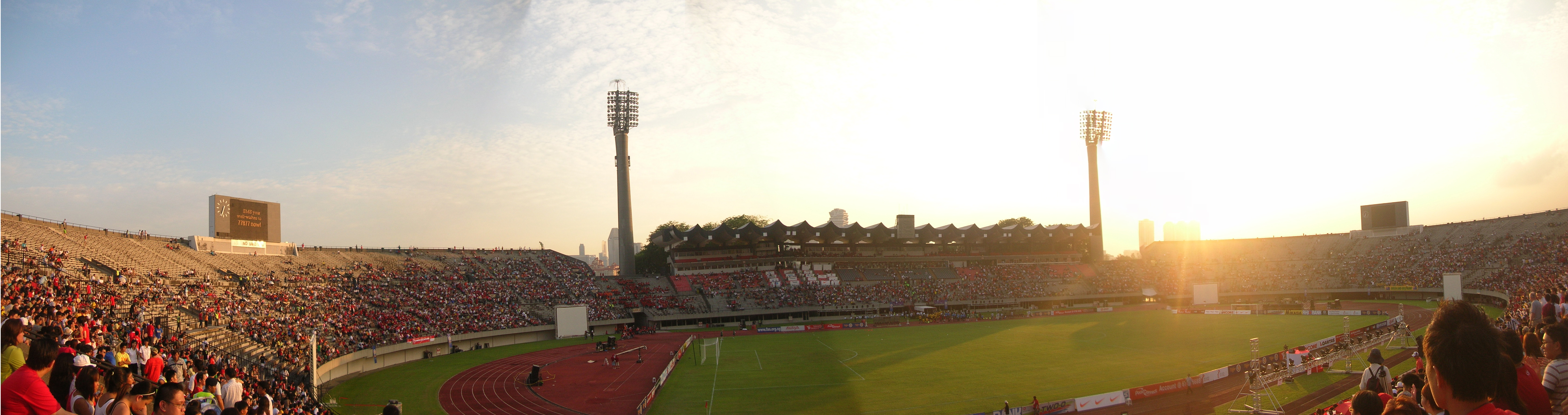
The closing ceremony held at the National Stadium on 30 June 2007

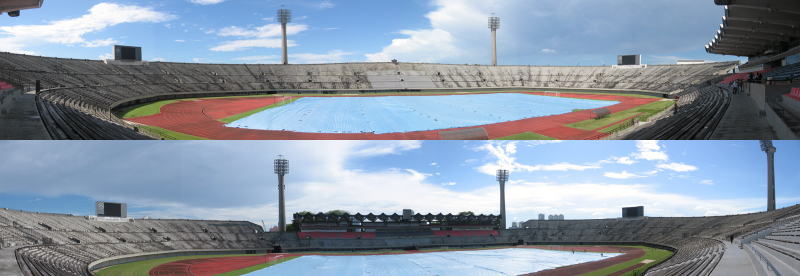
A montage of National Stadium, towards the eastern entrance (top) and the western entrance (bottom).

=== Demolition ===
On 29 September 2010, the former National Stadium started its demolition to make way for the construction of the Sports Hub. It was completely torn down in February 2011.

=== Post-closure ===
During the demolition of the former National Stadium, seating planks were salvaged and National Development Minister Khaw Boon Wan said that the salvaged planks could be recycled into bench as a way of commemorating the former National Stadium.

In 2012, the Urban Redevelopment Authority (URA) launched a design competition to design benches using the salvaged planks. A total of 30 designs were selected where 93 benches are created and located at 23 public spaces in Singapore. Of the designs and locations, ten designs and 15 locations chosen by the public in a competition. Some of the locations picked by public are Fort Canning, HortPark, Bishan-Ang Mo Kio Park and the National Museum of Singapore.

In 2017, URA launched a second design competition for the public to design benches using the remaining salvaged planks left after building the benches from the 2012 competition.

== Facilities ==
The National Stadium had an eight-lane running track and two 400m eight-lane tartan training tracks and football field in addition to other miscellaneous facilities such as table tennis tables, a weights room and an auditorium, housed underneath the spectator stands.

While the facilities were often used for high-profile sporting events, they could also be used by members of the public and other local organizations for a nominal fee. For example, when not otherwise used, the running track could be used by joggers for S$0.50 per entry.

The headquarters of the Singapore Sports Council used to be located at 15 Stadium Road.

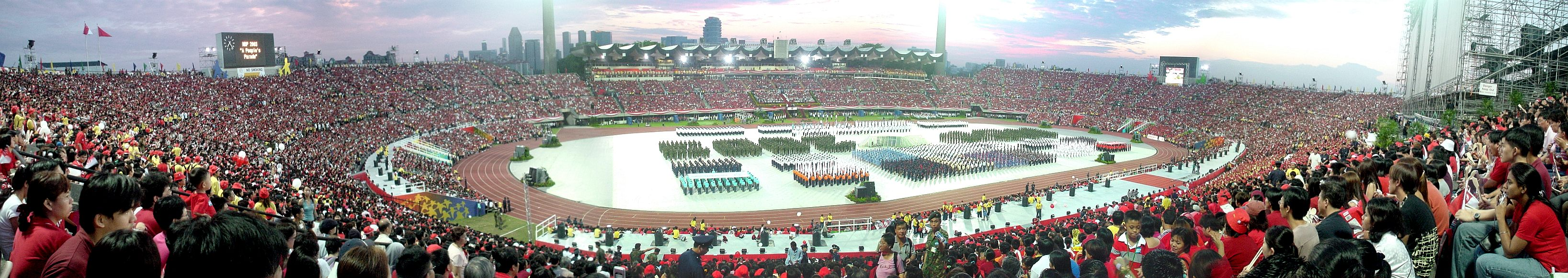
The preview show of the National Day Parade held at the National Stadium in 2003

=== New National Stadium ===
The new National Stadium was officially opened on 30 June 2014 on the site of the Former National Stadium.

== Timeline ==
The stadium's 44-year history is as follows:

- 1966
  - December: Work begins on the S$50 million complex.
- 1971
  - 4 June: Then-president Benjamin Sheares visits stadium before completion.
- 1973
  - 17 June: First event at the stadium – an international field hockey friendly between Singapore and Australia. Australia wins 3–0.
  - 24 June: First football match – Sultan's Gold Cup final between Singapore Malays and Kelantan Malays. Singapore wins 4–1 in front of a 32,000-strong crowd.
  - 21 July: Official opening by then Prime Minister Lee Kuan Yew.
  - 1–8 September: Hosts the 7th Southeast Asian Peninsular Games. Singapore wins 45 golds, 50 silvers and 45 bronzes. Singapore football team reach semi-finals before losing 3–5 on penalties to South Vietnam, after a 1–1 draw in extra-time.
  - 17 September: Practice track and tennis courts are open to public.
  - 24 October: Boxer Muhammad Ali fights in a five-round exhibition bout.
- 1976
  - 28 January: Former Philippines first lady, Imelda Marcos, visits in a Rolls-Royce.
  - 9 August: Stadium hosts first Singapore National Day Parade (NDP).
- 1977
  - 13 May: A crowd crush occurs at the ticketing booths before the Malaysia Cup final between Singapore and Selangor. One man dies as he suffers a fatal heart attack, and 44 are injured.
  - 13 July: Scottish football team Celtic beat Singapore 5–0 in Metro Quadrangular.
- 1982
  - 28 July: Singapore beat UCD 3–1 during the League of Ireland club's annual tour of South Asia.
- 1983
  - 28 May–6 June: Singapore hosts the Southeast Asian Games, winning 38 golds, 38 silvers and 58 bronzes. The football team, led by Fandi Ahmad and V. Sundramoorthy, reach their first final but are beaten 1–2 by Thailand.
  - Friday, 2 December: David Bowie performs with his band, Carlos Alomar, Carmine Rojas, Tony Thompson, Earl Slick, Lenny Pickett, Stan Harrison, Steve Elson, and David Lebolt in The Serious Moonlight Tour.
- 1986
  - 26 July: David Bowie performs.
  - 20 November: Pope John Paul II makes first visit to Singapore, and conducts a mass.
- 1988
  - 18 May: Stevie Wonder performs.
- 1990
  - 30 March: Arsenal beat South Korea 2–1 in the Caltex Cup, a match to commemorate Singapore's 25th year of independence.
- 1993
  - 18 March: Singapore beat J-League club Nagoya Grampus Eight 4–3 in a friendly.
  - 12–20 June: Singapore hosts Southeast Asian Games, winning 50 golds, 40 silvers and 74 bronzes. The football team however lose 4–5 to Myanmar in semi-finals on penalties. They lead 2–0 before Lim Tong Hai scores two own goals.
  - 29 August and 1 September: Michael Jackson performs two concerts there during his Dangerous World Tour in front of 94,000 people.
  - 2 October: Bon Jovi perform at the stadium on their I'll Sleep When I'm Dead Tour.
- 1995
  - 8 May: Bon Jovi perform at the stadium on their These Days Tour.
  - 20 May: English football club Nottingham Forest beat Singapore 3–1 in a friendly.
  - 26 May: Singapore beat English football club Tottenham Hotspur 4–2 on penalties in a friendly, drawing 1–1 at full-time.
- 1996
  - 1 April: Then-Prime Minister Goh Chok Tong is guest-of-honour at S-League's opening ceremony.
  - 1 August: English football club Newcastle United beat S-League All-Stars 5–0 in a friendly.
  - 25 October: Michael Jackson performs during the HIStory World Tour with 35,000 people in attendance.
- 1997
  - 3 September: J-League club Kashima Antlers beat Geylang United FC 2–1 in an Asian Club Championship (predecessor of AFC Champions League.)
- 1998
  - 4 March: Billy Joel and Elton John perform together.
  - 31 October: Singapore win their first international rugby union trophy, beating Sri Lanka 25–13 in the plate final of the Standard Chartered Asian Rugby Championships.
- 1999
  - 1 May: Taiwanese singer A*Mei is the first Asian artist to perform at Singapore National Stadium.
- 2000
  - 13 March: Mariah Carey performs for the first time in Singapore.
- 2001
  - 1 February: A fire causes damage to a media room above the grandstand.
  - 16 July: English football club Liverpool beat Singapore 2–0 in a friendly.
  - 24 July: English football club Manchester United thrash Singapore 8–1 in a friendly.
- 2002
  - 24 July: The National Day Parade's main stage catches fire because of an electrical fault.
  - 18 December: Singapore are beaten 0–4 by Malaysia in the Tiger Cup. Singapore, who were joint hosts with Indonesia for the group stages, were eventually knocked out of the competition after only managing a 1–1 draw with Thailand on 22 December.
- 2005
  - 16 January: Singapore wins the Tiger Cup at National Stadium, beating Indonesia 2–1 (5–2 on aggregate), in the second leg of the final.
- 2006
  - 9 August: Stadium hosts last National Day Parade.
- 2007
  - 31 January: Singapore beat Thailand 2–1 in the first leg of the Asean Football Championship final. They clinch their third Asean title on 4 February, drawing 1–1 in Bangkok to win 3–2 on aggregate.
  - 30 June: Official closing ceremony, as the stadium was scheduled to be torn down by the end of 2007 to make way for the new Singapore Sports Hub.
  - 9 August: The stadium's temporary facilities at Marina Bay Float stadium open and the National Day Parade 2007 is the first major event to be held there.
- 2008
  - 26 March: The National Stadium hosts a World Cup third round qualifying match for the first time, and Singapore beat Lebanon 2–0.
  - 3 April: The Sports Council announces that the stadium will host at least two more football games, due to ongoing delays in securing the paperwork for the Sports Hub construction.
  - 2 June: The stadium hosts the second home game for the World Cup third round qualifying match; Singapore lose 3–7 to Uzbekistan.
  - 14 June: The stadium hosts the third home game for the qualifying; Singapore lose 0–2 to Saudi Arabia.
  - 28 July: With the project for the new Sports Hub delayed, the stadium hosts a friendly against the Brazil Olympic team; Brazil win 3–0.
  - 21 December: In the Suzuki Cup semi-finals, the renamed Asean Football Championship, one leg of the game against Vietnam is played at the National Stadium, but Singapore lose to ten-man Vietnam to a goal by Nguyễn Quang Hải, then lose 0–1 on aggregate and are eliminated.
- 2009
  - 27 January: The stadium hosts the first Group E Asian Cup qualifiers match; the Singapore Lions beat Jordan 2–1.
  - 26 July: English football club Liverpool makes their second visit to Singapore and the Reds beat the Singapore national team 5–0.
  - 12 August: Singapore holds the Chinese national team to a 1–1 draw in a special National Day Challenge but lose 4–3 in the penalty shootout.
  - 4 November: The Singapore national team beat the Indonesian national team 3–1 in a friendly.
  - 14 November: The second Group E qualifier on home soil for the Asian Cup results in a 1–3 reverse to Thailand.
- 2010
  - 6 January: The third Group E qualifier for the Asian Cup is a 1–3 defeat to Iran.
  - 17 April: Taiwanese pop group Mayday's series of 2010 concerts Singapore leg, initially scheduled to be held at the Padang, was moved to the National Stadium due to overwhelming response. This is the first non-football event to be held at the stadium since the official closure.
  - June: The grass pitch is stripped bare and the grass is transplanted to other fields under the Sports Council such as the Kallang Practice Track. This is the first sign of the demolition of the stadium after a three-year delay.
  - 29 September: Demolition of the National Stadium begins, making way for the construction of the Sports Hub.
- 2011
  - February: The demolition of the entire stadium completes.
- 2012
  - Late 2012: It is announced that National Day Parade 2013 will be the last National Day Parade to be held at the Marina Bay Floating Stadium before moving back to Kallang in 2014.
- 2013
  - 10 June: Acting Minister for Culture, Community and Youth, Mr Lawrence Wong visits the construction site of the new National Stadium before its completion.
  - 26 November: It is announced that the National Day Parade in 2014 will now be the official last one at Marina Bay, as the Sports Hub will not make it on time for the parade.
- 2014
  - 14 February: Sports Hub CEO Philippe Collin Delavaud announces that the Sports Hub will not be fully open by April 2014 as the National Stadium's completion was pushed back to June 2014.
  - 30 June: The new National Stadium is officially opened on the former site of the National Stadium.

== See also ==
- Singapore Indoor Stadium
- National Stadium, Singapore

Preceded by Sabah Al-Salem Stadium; Kuwait City	AFC Asian Cup; Final Venue; 1984	Succeeded by Al-Ahly Stadium (Qatar) Doha
