= Cheng Ding An =

Singaporean director

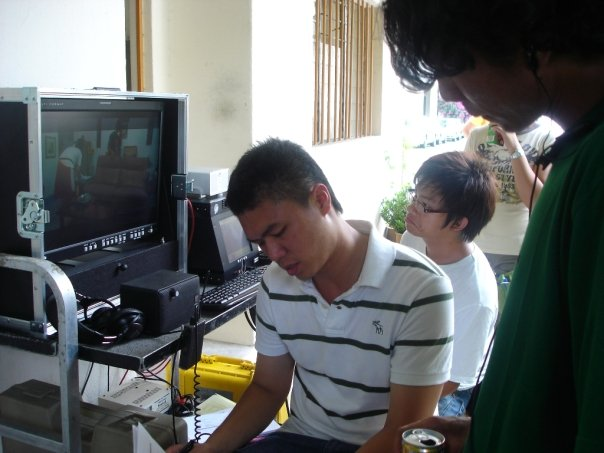
- Cheng in 2008
- Born: Singapore
- Occupation: Director

Cheng Ding An is a Singaporean director.

Cheng made his directing debut with Kallang Roar the Movie, a sports film on Singapore national football team’s legendary coach Choo Seng Quee which was released on 21 August 2008.

He also directed, Ghost on Air, starring deejay Dennis Chew in the lead role. It was released on 19 May 2012.

== Filmography ==
- Kallang Roar the Movie (2008)
- Ghost on Air (2012)
- Caishen "The God of Fortune" web series (2017)
