= Au-yeong Pak Kuan =

Singaporean footballer

Au-Yeong Pak Kuan
Personal information
- Full name: Au-Yeong Pak Kuan
- Date of birth: 24 August 1960 (age 66)
- Place of birth: Singapore
- Position: Defender

Senior career*
Years	Team	Apps	(Gls)
1979–1981	Singapore Armed Forces (SAFSA)	60	(18)
1982–1984	Changi CSC	54	(15)
1989–1990	Jurong Town FC	30	(5)

International career
1979–1989	Singapore	80	(16)
- * Club domestic league appearances and goals

Au-Yeong Pak Kuan (simplified Chinese: 欧阳伯钧; traditional Chinese: 歐陽伯鈞, born 24 August 1960) is a Singaporean former footballer and team captain for the Singapore national football team, for which he made more than 80 appearances. He was nominated by the Football Association of Singapore for the Singapore National Olympic Council's meritorious award, was the recipient of a Football Association of Singapore overseas scholarship studies award and also captained Singapore at the 1984 Asian Cup.

== Early life ==
Au Yeong studied in Raffles Institution, Singapore Polytechnic and the University of Surrey. During his years in Raffles Institution from 1973 to 1978, he developed his football and leadership skills. Coaches who had inspired him were RBI Pates and Syed Ahmad Alsagoff. Au Yeong went on to represent the Combined Schools Team (1976-1978), Singapore Youth Team (1977–78) and the National Intermediate Team (1978).The pinnacle of this youth development phase was when Au Yeong coached, played and captained the Raffles Institution's Post Secondary Team to win the Post Secondary National Schools Championship Finals at the National Stadium in 1978. He scored a hattrick and Raffles Institution went on to win 5–1 over Geylang Serai Vocational Institute. A memorable match firmly etched in his young memory. That team was one of the best which Raffles Institution had ever produced.

== Football career ==
=== Club career ===
Au Yeong played his first club level football with the Singapore Armed Forces football team (SAFSA) when he was drafted into the armed forces in 1979. Between 1979 and 1981 Au Yeong represented SAFSA in the domestic National Football League Division I. He then joined Changi CSC between 1982 and 1984. Following his graduation from his overseas studies, Au Yeong returned to Singapore FA in 1988 and retired from national football duties in 1989. He however continued playing at club level for Jurong FC (formerly known as Jurong Town FC) in the FAS Premier League, an inaugural semi professional league, in Singapore where they won the President's Cup and Singapore Pool's Cup in 1989 and finished runners-up to Geylang International in the league in 1989 and 1990. In 1991, at the age of 30, Au Yeong subsequently retired from football in Singapore.

=== International career ===
Au Yeong was recruited to the national team by Jita Singh in 1979 and made his international debut for Singapore FA in friendly match against the South Korea national football team in the same year. He captained the Singapore national football team from 1981 to 1985 amassing more than 80 caps and 16 goals in total for the country from 1979 to 1989 tournaments. Au Yeong participated in the following tournaments.

FIFA World Cup Qualifying Tournament (AFC)

o 1982 (group stage)

o 1986 (group stage)

o 1990 (group stage)

Summer Olympic Qualifying Tournament (Asia Qualifying)

o 1980 (final round group 3 runners up to Iran)

o 1984 (group stage)

AFC Asian Cup

o 1984 (Singapore)

South East Asian (SEA) Games

o 1979 (Jakarta - group stage)

o 1981 (Manila - 4th place)

o 1983 (Singapore - Silver Medalist)

o 1989 (Kuala Lumpur - Silver Medalist)

Malaysia Cup

o 1980 (League runners-up and Cup champions)

o 1981 (League champions and Cup runners-up)

o 1985 (League champions and Cup quarterfinalist)

Au Yeong also participated in numerous other regional tournaments in Asia including the Merdeka Cup (Malaysia), Merlion Cup & Ovaltine Cup (Singapore), King's Cup (Thailand), The Great Wall Cup (China) and Kirin Cup (Japan).

Au Yeong was often referred to as Captain Courageous, with a report of the Singapore Monitor praising him for his hallmark leadership, motivation and communication skills on the field well acknowledged by the football fraternity. He was also nicknamed "The Utility Man" as he was able to play in any position comfortably. He was an extremely versatile and consistent player having performed well, as either a striker / midfielder / defender in major tournaments. Au Yeong was also the team's penalty kicker having missed only 2 kicks in his entire football career.

== Career ==
In recognition of his effort for serving the Singapore National Football Team from 1979 to 1985, Au Yeong was awarded a Football Association of Singapore (FAS) Scholarship, a first in Singapore, to pursue an Electrical & Electronics Engineering Degree in the University of Surrey (England) from 1985 to 1987. Upon his return from England with a Bachelor of Science Degree (first class honors), Au Yeong started his engineering career with Pepperl+Fuchs Pte Ltd, a German company based in Singapore as a systems engineer.

After retiring from football, Au Yeong switched to the sister company Pepperl+Fuchs Systems BV which would later, become Honeywell Safety Management System BV. Between 1991 and 2013, Au Yeong worked for various Honeywell companies. He lived and worked in The Netherlands and Austria and held various general management and director positions. After more than 25 years with Honeywell, Au Yeong joined Tridonic GmbH, a sister company of the Zumtobel Group in Dornbirn, Austria. He has been with Tridonic GmbH since 2013.

== Accolades ==
He was a member of the Singapore national football team which was awarded Team of Year by the Singapore National Olympic Council in 1980.

In 1985, he was nominated by the Football Association of Singapore for the Singapore National Olympic Council's meritorious award.

== Personal life ==
Au Yeong is married to Karin Hörburger, an Austrian from Bregenzerwald, Vorarlberg who worked at the Austrian High Commission in Singapore. They met shortly after Karin arrived in Singapore for her foreign assignment in February 1990 and were married in November 1991. Together they have two sons, Alexander and Daniel and a daughter, Serena. The family migrated to Vorarlberg, Austria in 2009.

Sporting positions
Preceded by Samad Allapitchay	Singapore national team captain 1981-1985	Succeeded by Malek Awab
