= Gan Mei Yan =

Malaysian radio announcer (born 1984)

- Born: 9 June 1984 (age 42); Petaling Jaya, Selangor, Malaysia
- Education: Tunku Abdul Rahman University College
- Occupations: Radio announcer, Actress, Host, Influencer
- Years active: 2004–present

Chinese name
- Simplified Chinese: 颜薇恩
- Hanyu Pinyin: Yán Wēi'ēn
- Jyutping: Ngaan4 Mei4 Jan1

Gan Mei Yan (颜薇恩; born 9 June 1984) is a Malaysian former radio announcer, actress, TV and event host, brand ambassador, and influencer. She was born in Petaling Jaya, West Malaysia. Gan started her entertainment career as a radio announcer at Astro Radio in 2004, at the age of 19, with MY and has hosted numerous events, shows, and ceremonies. She has appeared in various feature films, television programs and shows, music videos, online advertisements, and television commercials.

== Career ==
Gan graduated from Tunku Abdul Rahman University College with a Diploma of Media Study. She started her career at the age of 19 when she was chosen to be the host of TV program Fan Miu Dai Gik Jin on Astro Wah Lai Toi. In 2004, Gan switched careers to become a radio announcer at MY.

Currently, she is a breakfast announcer of MY Yong Guong Can Lan (阳光灿烂) from 6 to 10 am on weekdays. She is also the leading female announcer in MY (Astro Radio Sdn Bhd) until July 31, 2026.

Other than radio, Gan hosts dinner shows, artist showcases, artist fans meeting, live shows, concerts, press conferences, and client's events. Additionally, she is also a social media influencer with a large following on Instagram and Facebook. She shares her lifestyle and interacts with her fans and followers via social media platforms.

Besides, Gan debuted in the Malaysian feature film Tiger Woo Hoo and played Ah Lian’s role, which were presented by Astro in 2010 and her performance was remarkable. In the following year, she received more performance opportunities and featured in many Malaysian feature films, such as Xiao Yong Chun, Great Day, Ah Beng the Movie: 3 Wishes, 3x Trouble, and many more.

=== MY Yong Guong Can Lan ===
MY – Yong Guong Can Lan is the most popular Chinese radio program in Malaysia. From AC Nielsen's and GSK market research on Malaysian listener's behaviour, MY have been achieving the highest listenership since year 1996. Many have credited the program's No.1 rating as due to her creativity, energy, and powerful voice seen throughout her breakfast show. Gan left MY on July 31, 2026, ending her career as a full time radio announcer.

== Personal life ==
Gan has been married to Eddie Lee since 17 May 2013 and is a mother of two children, Jo and Sum.

== Filmography ==
=== Film ===
Year	Title	Role	Director	Notes
2010	Tiger Woo Hoo	Ah Beng's neighbour, Ah Lian	Chiu Keng Guan	
2011	Xiao Yong Chun	Mary	Choi Lik	
2011	Great Day	Ah Lian	Chiu Keng Guan	
2012	Ah Beng the Movie: 3 Wishes	Ah Lian	Silver Yee	
2012	3x Trouble	Mei Mei	Patrick Yau	
2012	Ghost on Air	Ping Xiao's late girlfriend, Jia Li	Cheng Ding An	
2013	Once Upon A Time	Ru Hua	Silver Yee	
2013	Taxi! Taxi!	Lee Ah Tau's tenant, Regina	Kelvin Sng	
2014	Balistik (Malay movie)		Silver Yee	
2014	3 Brothers	Ah Yun	Silver Yee	
2014	Ah Beng: Mission Impossible	Ah Lian	Silver Yee	
2016	Huat the Fish	Qiao Yu	Silver Yee	
2017	Shuttle Life	Xiao Chuan	Seng Kiat Tan	
2020	Good Wealth 2020	Prodigy	Teddy Chin	
2022	Kongsi Raya	Sumi	Teddy Chin	
2023	What! The Heist	Professor's Wife	Matt Lai	
2026	Ah Beng vs Liang Popo	Ah Lian	Matt Lai	

=== Television programme (Host) ===
Year	Title	Notes
2004	Running Out of Time	Chinese version of Amazing Race
2005	Astro Talent Quest	Singing competition
2006-2007	Go Go Trendy	Program about being trendy
2008	Yes Madam	Makeover program in which Gan is a fashion policewoman
2008-2013	Astro On Demand	Introduced the latest Hong Kong drama
2008-2009	Battle Ground	Street dance competition
2012	Miss Astro Chinese International Pageant	
2016	Super Comedian	
2017-2018	Astro Go Shop	Gan's show

== Endorsement ==
Year	Title	Notes
2006-2007	Julie's biscuits (MYVITO)	Food
2007-2008	JF Beauty	Cosmetic
2008-2010	Jacob's Walk of Health campaign	Food
2008-2010	Purina One dog food (Representative – my dog HACKER)	Pet Food
2008-2009	MONICA eyewear	Eyewear
2008	Nivea White Sparkling	Cosmetic
2009-2010	White horse tiles (only on radio)	Ceramic
March 2013	SASA store anniversary	Cosmetic
February–April 2013	KWC Fashion Mall	Fashion
April–August 2013	Osim	Healthy Living
2017	Himmel Food Dehydrator	Kitchen Appliances
2017	SWS 28 Medical	Medical & Confinement
2017-2018	YYC Tax Consultant Sdn Bhd	Accounting Firm
2018-2019	Sushi Mentai	Food
2018-2020	Dorra Slimming	Body Health
2019-2020	Tour Rite	Travelling
2019-2020	Guardian	Cosmetic
2019-2020	Comfy Baby	
