= Seak Poh Leong =

Singaporean footballer

Personal information
- Place of birth: Singapore
- Position: Midfielder

Senior career*
Years	Team	Apps	(Gls)
- SAFSA
- Singapore FA

International career
1971–1976	Singapore	56	

Managerial career
- 1979: Singapore (assistant)
- 1987–1988: Singapore
- 1997–2002: Geylang United (director of football)
- 2000: Geylang United (caretaker)
- 2002: Geylang United
- 2002–2005: Geylang United (director of football)
- 2005: Geylang United
- 2009: Geylang United
- 2009–2010: Geylang United (technical advisor)
- * Club domestic league appearances and goals

Seak Poh Leong (born 1952) is a former Singapore national football team captain who played for National Football League side Singapore Armed Forces Sports Association and Singapore FA in the Malaysia Cup as a midfielder. He was the national team coach from 1987 to 1988 and had a reputation as a strict disciplinarian.

== Coaching career ==
=== Singapore national team ===
Seak began his coaching career as assistant to Singapore national team coach Trevor Hartley in 1979 and coach of Singapore's intermediate and youth teams. Following an 18-month training stint in West Germany, Seak became Singapore's first professional football coach in August 1984. He was appointed by the Football Association of Singapore (FAS) as their Soccer Development Director as well as the Director of Coaching in 1985. A year later, he was confirmed as national team coach on a 2-year contract. (Note: Two-year deal starting from January 1987.) He rejected a 2-year extension following the expiry of his initial deal in favour of focusing on his Director of Coaching role to be actively involved in the long-term development of Singapore football. His services were terminated by the FAS in 1991 due to a lack of funding for the position.

=== Geylang United ===
Seak was appointed Geylang United's Director of Football on 10 October 1997. In a surprise move, he relinquished the position to take over as team manager in early 2002, taking charge of "picking the team and determining how it plays". 2001 Coach of the year Jang Jung who had won the S.League with Geylang the previous year was reassigned to coaching duties, Jang resumed head coach responsibilities after Seak decided to step down as team manager, reverting to his Director of Football role in August 2002 with 6 matches left and Geylang 3rd in the league standings. Jang's contract was not renewed at the end of the season.

With the resignation of Scott O'Donell and Darren Stewart's rejection of the position, Seak officially took over as Geylang head coach in August 2005.

Geylang United appointed a committee of three - Seak (technical advisor), Lim Tong Hai (team manager) and coach Mike Wong - to manage the squad at the start of the 2009 S.League season. The committee was abolished in March with the head coach reins handed over solely to Wong, with Lim and Seak retaining their respective roles, following disappointing league results.

== Notes ==
Sporting positions
Preceded by Quah Kim Lye	Singapore national team captain 1973-1976	Succeeded by Samad Allapitchay
