= Choo Seng Quee =

Singaporean footballer and manager (1914–1983)

Choo Seng Quee 朱成贵

Personal information
- Full name: Joseph Choo Seng Quee
- Date of birth: 1 December 1914
- Place of birth: Singapore, Straits Settlements
- Date of death: 30 June 1983 (aged 68)
- Place of death: Singapore
- Position: Centre-half

Senior career*
Years	Team	Apps	(Gls)
1933–1939	Singapore Chinese FA		
1939–1940	Chinese Athletic Association		
1940–1941	Sing Tao		
1945–1949	Chinese Athletic Association		

International career
1936–1939	Singapore		

Managerial career
- 19??–19??: Chinese Athletic Association (player-coach)
- 1945–1949: Chinese Athletic Association (player-coach)
- 1949–1950: Singapore FA
- 1951–1953: Indonesia
- 1952–1957: Star Soccerites
- 1957: Marine Department Sports Club
- 1958–1964: Malaya / Malaysia
- 1964–1965: Singapore
- 1967: Singapore
- 1968–1969: Police Sports Association
- 1971: Singapore
- 1976–1977: Singapore
- 1980–1981: Johor FA
- * Club domestic league appearances and goals

Joseph Choo Seng Quee (Note: Chinese: 朱成贵; pinyin: Zhū Chéngguì) PBM (1 December 1914 – 30 June 1983), popularly known as Uncle Choo, was a Singaporean footballer and football coach. He was a coach for the Indonesia, Malaya/Malaysia and Singapore national teams, and is widely recognised as one of Singapore's best football coaches.

Choo began his playing career playing as a right full-back with Singapore Chinese Football Association in the SAFA leagues in 1933. His performances led to a call-up to the Singapore FA team in the Malaya Cup competition. He was converted to a centre-half as the Lions won the Malaya Cup in 1937 and 1939. During World War II, he wrote British propaganda in Macau. In 1939, he helped to found the Chinese Athletic Association where he took on the role of player-coach. He retired as a player to concentrate on his coaching duties in 1949.

From 1951 to 1953, Choo coached the Indonesia national team on an honorary basis. The team toured Hong Kong in 1953, achieving wins over professional Hong Kong outfits. Choo was appointed Malaya national coach in 1958. He led the team to three Merdeka Tournament titles from 1958 to 1960. With Choo, Malaya also won the 1961 Southeast Asian Peninsular Games football competition and the bronze at the 1962 Asian Games. Choo left Malaysia and returned to Singapore in 1964. He was appointed Singapore national coach over four stints from 1964 to 1977. He won the Malaysia Cup in 1977, twelve years after Singapore's last triumph. His achievements earned him the 1977 Coach of the Year award. The following year, he was honoured with the Pingat Bakti Masyarakat medal for his services to Singapore football.

Choo had a skin infection of his leg which he left untreated during the 1977 season. With diabetes as a complication, his condition worsened and he was forced to amputate his gangrenous right leg in September 1977. He returned to coaching during a brief stint with Johor FA in 1980 but left in early 1981. In June 1983, he was admitted to hospital with kidney problems. He died at the age of 68 on 30 June.

== Early life ==
Choo received his education at Victoria Bridge School and Raffles Institution. He picked up football when he was studying for his Senior Cambridge certificate at Raffles Institution. He represented the school in the inter-school competition in 1930, playing as a right full-back. National player Lim Yong Liang began to mentor him after he was impressed by his ability.

== Club career ==
Choo began his playing career for Singapore Chinese F.A.'s third team in the Third Division in 1933. The club won all of their league games that season to win the title. The following year, he was selected for their Second Division title-winning team. He broke into the S.C.F.A.'s senior team in 1935 and won the SAFA First Division in 1937 and 1938, and the SAFA Challenge Cup in 1935, 1937 and 1939.

His performances led to a call-up by Singapore FA (Note: Singapore FA were the representative state team which participated in Malayan competitions.) for the Malaya Cup. He was converted to the centre-half position he played in the team from 1936 to 1939. Choo won the Malaya Cup with Singapore in 1937 and 1939, after defeating Selangor in both finals.

In 1939, Choo was part of the Malayan Chinese F.A. side that toured Manila, Hong Kong and Macau. The China national team selectors expressed interest in calling Choo for the 1940 Summer Olympics but the event was cancelled with the impending World War II.

Choo left S.C.F.A. in 1939 to help found the Chinese Athletic Association (Note: Also known as Chung Wah FC.) as well as assuming the role of player-coach. The club was admitted to the SAFA league in 1941. He played for Hong Kong club Sing Tao from 1940 to 1941. Choo stayed in Macau and China during World War II, and wrote propaganda while an agent for the British as manager of the British-backed Macao Tribune. He once had to secretly relocate the fiancée of a Singapore friend from Macao to China and although he was found out by the Japanese, escaped capture by walking back to Macao over five nights. Despite his activities, he was never caught during the Japanese occupation.

After the war, Choo returned to Chinese A.A. as player-coach. He retired as a player in 1949 to concentrate on his coaching duties.

== Coaching career ==
=== Early career ===
Choo was elected coach of Singapore Chinese F.A. in early 1949. He started coaching Singapore FA for their Malaya Cup campaign in March 1949. He stepped down as coach of S.C.F.A. in July 1949 and as manager and coach of Chinese A.A. a month later.

In 1952, Choo became manager and coach of SAFA Second Division Star Soccerites, a club he founded. The club had ended 7th in the league the previous season but finished runners-up in 1952 to secure promotion to the First Division. Star Soccerites won the title in 1954. On 5 March 1957, the club opened their league season with a record 17–1 win over Royal Engineers Civilian Association. Choo left Star Soccerites in 1957 and joined Marine Department Sports Club, coaching them to the First Division title.

Choo was appointed the first foreign coach of the Indonesia national team in 1951, which he held in an honorary position concurrent with his club duties. He led the team at the 1951 Asian Games. In April 1953, Indonesia toured Hong Kong, beating professional sides Hong Kong Interport 4–1, Hong Kong Selection 3–2, and Hong Kong Combined Chinese 5–1.

=== Malaya / Malaysia ===
On 1 February 1958, Choo was employed on $700 monthly wages to coach the Malaya national team and hold coaching clinics for the Malay states. Choo's first match in charge ended in a 5–2 victory over Singapore on 2 March. Malaya hosted the five-nation Merdeka Tournament at the end of August, defeating 1958 Asian Games bronze medalists Indonesia 3–2 and Hong Kong 3–0 (Note: The Hong Kong players apparently made up the same team that won the 1958 Asian Games gold medal for the Republic of China.) en route to winning the tournament. Malaya started their defence of the Merdeka Tournament in 1959 with a 4–3 win over South Vietnam. The team then drew 1–1 with India before a 2–1 win over Hong Kong confirmed them as champions. Nine countries took part in the 1960 Merdeka Tournament. Malaya began with a 3–0 win over Japan. An 8–2 defeat of Thailand and a one-goal win over Pakistan followed. Malaya shared the trophy with South Korea after a goalless draw in the final.

In January 1961, Choo signed a two-year contract extension with the FAM. Right after extending his contract, Choo departed on a six-month coaching course in England where he was attached to champions Burnley and other clubs like Everton, Sheffield United for the 1960–61 Football League season. The trip was made under a personal arrangement by FAM president Tunku Abdul Rahman (Note: Tunku was also the Malayan Prime Minister.) with a British Council bursary. Choo tendered his resignation as Malayan national coach in 1961 but was persuaded by Tunku to continue in his coaching position. Tunku declared that his resignation "will certainly be a calamity to the football fraternity of Malaya".

At the Southeast Asian Peninsular Games in December 1961, Malaya defeated Burma 2–1 and Cambodia 4–0 to top their group. They advanced to the final by virtue of winning the coin toss after a 2–2 draw with Thailand in the semi-finals. Malaya scored two late goals in the final ten minutes to defeat hosts Burma 2–0 to win the football competition.

Malaya opened their 1962 Asian Games campaign with a 15–1 win over the Philippines in the preliminary group stage. They finished second in the group and were drawn against South Korea in the semi-final, which they lost 2–1 after extra time. In the third-place play-off, Malaya defeated South Vietnam 4–1 to clinch the bronze medal.

Choo's contract ended in March 1963 and was not renewed. He was appointed the national schools coach responsible for training and scouting youth players on 1 April. With the delay in the appointment of a new national coach, Choo was tasked by Tunku with coaching the Malaysia (Note: The country of Malaysia was formed through the merger of Malaya, North Borneo, Sarawak and Singapore on 16 September 1963.) team from 10 September to prepare the players for the 1964 Olympics qualifiers and other upcoming tournaments. Choo left Malaysia at the end of the Merdeka Tournament in September 1964 after he felt he was under-utilised in his coaching capacity. Choo had also rejected coaching offers from Japan, Thailand, Hong Kong and Indonesia during his time with the FAM.

=== Singapore ===
==== 1964 to 1971 ====
The SAFA had rejected Choo's previous offers to coach the Singapore national team. Choo again indicated his availability to coach the team over his three months' leave from April 1964. The next month, SAFA put in a request to engage Choo's services in training Singapore FA for the Malaya Cup. Tunku Abdul Rahman, the Malaysian Prime Minister and President of the FAM, approved Choo's secondment to SAFA in June. Following a 1–1 draw, Singapore beat Hong Kong 2–1 in the replay to claim the Aw Hoe Cup, an annual competition between Singapore and Hong Kong, in July. The next month, Singapore defeated Perak 3–2 in the final to clinch the 1964 Malaya Cup. Choo offered to coach Singapore in January 1965 and SAFA responded with a contract offer of $250 monthly wages plus a cut of the gate receipts in February which Choo accepted in March. Singapore retained the Malaya Cup in 1965, defeating Selangor 3–1 in the final. For the second consecutive year, Singapore won the Aw Hoe Cup after a replay.

In December 1965, Singapore was eliminated at the group stage of the 1965 Southeast Asian Peninsular Games after losses to Burma and South Vietnam. On 28 December, the SAFA sacked Choo with immediate effect and dropped six players from national team due to alleged misconduct and insubordination at the 1965 Southeast Asian Peninsular Games. Team manager Tan Peng Yee had reported that Choo "was being difficult from the very moment the team arrived in Kuala Lumpur from Hong Kong". Choo was also charged with not following the manager's instructions and inciting resentment and undisciplined behaviour of the team in general. He offered to assist in coaching the national team in June 1966 but was rejected by the Football Association of Singapore (FAS), formerly known as SAFA, which cited a lack of funds to pay his salary.

Choo was one of three coaches appointed to coach the national team reserves in January 1967 and took full reins over the reserves in March. He returned as national coach on 8 August 1967, taking charge of the squad for the Merdeka Tournament in the same month. Singapore ended up last in the 10-team competition. Due to concerns expressed by Sports Minister Othman Wok that an inter-state competition is inappropriate for the national team, Singapore withdrew from the Malaysia Cup (Note: The Malaya Cup was renamed the Malaysia Cup in 1967.) and FAM Cup in 1968 and 1969. In his time outside the national team set-up, Choo coached Police Sports Association from September 1968 and led them to the 1968 President's Cup.

In June 1971, the National Sports Promotion Board (Note: Caretakers of FAS pending election of new FAS council.) assigned Choo to the national team coaching panel. Singapore was invited to the 12-nation Merdeka Tournament in August. The team defeated Hong Kong 2–1 and achieved a shock 1–0 win over pre-tournament favourites and 1970 Asian Games champions Burma. Singapore failed to make the semi-finals after a 4–4 draw with the Philippines. Choo later resigned in December due to poor health. In 1973, Choo rejected a coaching contract worth $2,800 per month, with first-class board and lodging, and free transport from professional Hong Kong club Caroline Hill FC. He accepted an $2,500 per month offer by the PSSI to coach the West Irian state team in December but resigned after two months.

==== 1971 onwards ====
Between 1971 and 1975, Choo was honorary coach of local clubs including:

- Burnley United,
- Singapore Marble (Note: Later renamed Toa Payoh United.),
- Tampines Rovers,
- Farrer Park Constituency, and
- Toa Payoh United (a return to Singapore Marble after it changed its name), and
- Upper Serangoon United.

The FAS rejected Choo's application for national coach in September 1974.

On 2 September 1976, Choo was appointed to coach Singapore for the preliminary World Cup tournament in February 1977 in his 4th stint with the FAS. His appointment prompted FAS advisor Trevor Hartley, coach Hussein Aljunied and trainer Andrew Yap to resign from the coaching panel although Hussein would return to assist Choo in late September. With the support of newly elected FAS chairman N. Ganesan, Choo was able to have non-interference in matchday selection of players for the first time. Singapore started the tournament with a 2–0 win over Thailand and a 2–2 draw with Hong Kong. They then defeated fancied Malaysia 1–0 to secure a play-off spot despite losing to Indonesia in the last group match. In the play-off match on 12 March, Singapore lost 1–0 to Hong Kong to eliminate their chances of reaching the final qualifying round. Choo had announced his intention to relinquish his position after the play-off due to his advanced age and a need to focus on his business. but eventually stayed on as national coach on a voluntary basis with performance-based payouts.

"But Singapore players let the ball do work for them because my theory has always been that a player can never be fitter than the ball. And the ball can never get tired."

— Choo on the 1977 Malaysia Cup final.

In the 1977 Malaysia Cup, Singapore overcame defending champions Selangor 4–2 over two legs to advance to the final. Twelve years after its last triumph, Singapore defeated Penang 3–2 to win the Malaysia Cup on 28 May. Choo was praised for his tactical substitutes in the second half in which he replaced captain Samad Allapitchay and free-kick specialist S. Rajagopal with Lim Teng Sai and Nasir Jalil respectively. Following reported unhappiness of the players over the disparity in bonuses and mistreatment by the management leading to an alleged boycott of training, Choo rejected a one-year contract offer by the FAS and tendered his resignation on 27 June but withdrew it after talks with the FAS and the national players.

Choo had developed a skin infection on his right leg after a fall sustained during the Malaysia Cup semi-final second leg against Selangor in May. He failed to seek treatment and with diabetes as a complication, gangrene set in. He had his lower right leg amputated in September. Following his operation, Choo was relieved of his duties as national coach. Despite the loss of his leg, Choo stated his intention to continue coaching. He returned to coaching with Malaysian outfit Johor FA midway through the 1980 season but left the team abruptly in January 1981.

== Personal life ==
Choo and wife Margaret Boon Khin Siang had three children - son Boon Keng, Robert and daughters Geok Lan, Theresa and Geok Kim, Helen.

Choo was the owner of the Maju Jaya Sports Store at Owen Road, Singapore. Choo had donated trophies made by his store for football competitions.

Choo was a diabetic. He refused treatment for a leg infection leading into the 1977 Malaysia Cup final. His condition worsened and he had his gangrenous right lower leg amputated to the knee on 14 September 1977. As a result of spreading gangrene, a further amputation on his right upper leg was performed five days later. Choo's heart stopped thrice - during the first and second operations, and a third following internal bleeding.

== Death ==
Choo was hospitalised with kidney problems in June 1983. On 30 June, he died at the age of 68 in his sleep at home. Over 1,500 fans attended his funeral wake and around 500 mourners were present at his burial. Players Edmund Wee, Quah Kim Song, Ho Kwang Hock, R. Suriamurthi, T. Pathmanathan were among the pallbearers.

== Honours ==
Choo's performances in the preliminary World Cup tournament and the 1977 Malaysia Cup win earned him recognition with the 1977 SNOC Coach of the Year award. He was honoured with the Pingat Bakti Masyarakat medal in 1978 for his services to Singapore football. On 3 August 1982, he received a First Class gold medal from the PSSI for his contributions to Indonesian football.

=== Player ===
Singapore Chinese Football Association

- SAFA First Division: 1937, 1938
- SAFA Second Division: 1934
- SAFA Third Division: 1933
- SAFA Challenge Cup: 1935, 1937, 1939

Singapore FA

- Malaya Cup: 1937, 1939

=== Coach ===
Star Soccerites

- SAFA First Division: 1954

Marine Department Sports Club

- SAFA First Division: 1957

Police SA

- President's Cup: 1968

Singapore FA

- Malaya Cup: 1964, 1965, 1977
- FAM Cup: 1967

Malaya

- Merdeka Tournament: 1958, 1959, 1960 (shared)
- Southeast Asian Peninsular Games: 1961
- Asian Games: Bronze medal – 1962

=== Individual ===
- SNOC Coach of the Year: 1977

=== Civil ===
- Pingat Bakti Masyarakat: 1978

== See also ==
- Kallang Roar the Movie – A film on Choo Seng Quee and Singapore's Malaysia Cup win in 1977.
