= Jang Jung =

South Korean footballer (born 1964)

Jang Jung 장정
Personal information
- Full name: Jang Jung
- Date of birth: 5 May 1964 (age 62)
- Place of birth: South Korea
- Position: Centre-back

Youth career
- Ajou University

Senior career*
Years	Team	Apps	(Gls)
1987–1988	Lucky-Goldstar Hwangso	33	(2)
1989	Ilhwa Chunma	16	(2)
1990–1991	Perak	38	(6)
1992–1993	Singapore FA	23	(1)
1997–1998	Geylang United	25	(1)

International career
1981–1983	South Korea U-20	17	(2)
1983–1984	South Korea	5	(1)
1995	Singapore	1	(0)

Managerial career
- 1998–2000: Geylang United (youth)
- 1998–2000: Geylang United (assistant)
- 2001: Geylang United
- 2002: Geylang United (assistant)
- 2002: Geylang United
- 2003–2004: Balestier Khalsa
- 2004–2005: Balestier Khalsa (technical advisor)
- 2006–2007: Sri Lanka U23
- 2007–2008: Sri Lanka
- 2010–2012: Sri Lanka
- 2012: Perak
- * Club domestic league appearances and goals

Jang Jung (Korean: 장정) is a South Korean former footballer who mostly played as a centre-back throughout his entire career.

== Playing career ==
=== Club career ===
Jang formerly played with Lucky-Goldstar Hwangso in South Korea.

In 1991, he joined Perak FA in Malaysia. In 1993, he joined Singapore FA and Geylang United in Singapore.

=== International career ===
Jang played for the South Korea U20 team and won the bronze medal in the 1983 World Youth Championship.

He also represented the South Korean Olympic team for the 1985 Merlion Cup.

Jang played several matches for the South Korea senior side, including qualifying matches to the 1984 Summer Olympics between 1983 and 1984.

He also capped once for the Singapore national team in February 1995 during a friendly match against New Zealand.

== Coaching career ==
=== Geylang United ===
While playing for Geylang United, Jang was trained as a coach and completed his qualifications. He eventually became part of the club's youth coaching system and also the club assistant head coach after his retirement in 1998.

Jang then became the head coach of the club in 2001 where he won the S.League title in his first season in charge of the club. In 2002, he was reassigned to assistant under Seak Poh Leong before he became the club technical director thus seeing Jang back at the helms. He left the club after the 2002 season has ended

=== Balestier Khalsa ===
On 10 April 2003, Jang was appointed as head coach at Balestier Khalsa. On 26 June 2004, he was reassigned as the club technical director.

=== Sri Lanka national team ===
In January 2006, Jang coached the Sri Lanka's U23 and their Sri Lanka senior national team for six years until April 2012.

=== Perak FA ===
On 19 July 2012, it was announced that Jang will take over his former team Perak FA's head coach position from Norizan Bakar on an interim basis until the end of the 2012 Malaysia Cup campaign. His spell with Perak was a disappointing one, recording only one win, while suffering three draws and two defeats in six Malaysia Cup group stage matches, failing to qualify to the quarter-finals. His contract was not renewed after the Malaysia Cup exit.

== Personal life ==
Jang is married and has a son and a daughter.

== International goals ==
Results list South Korea's goal tally first.

Date	Venue	Opponent	Score	Result	Competition
July 29, 1983	(United States) Los Angeles	Guatemala	1 goal	1–1 (3–5 PSO)	1983 LA Tournament

== Honours ==
=== Player ===
Perak

- Malaysia FA Cup: 1990

Singapore Lions

- M-League: 1994
- Malaysia Cup: 1994

=== Manager ===
Geylang United

- S.League: 2001

=== Individual ===
- S.League Coach of the Year: 2001
