= Geylang International FC =

Football club in Singapore

Geylang International
- Full name: Geylang International Football Club
- Nickname: The Eagles
- Founded: 1973; 53 years ago as International Contract Specialist; 1975; 51 years ago as Geylang International; 1996; 30 years ago as Geylang United; 2013; 13 years ago as Geylang International
- Ground: Our Tampines Hub
- Capacity: 5,000
- Chairman: Desmond Gay
- Head coach: Mohd Noor Ali
- League: Singapore Premier League
- 2025–26: Singapore Premier League, 5th from 8
- Website: geylang.football
Home colours	Away colours

Geylang International Football Club is a professional football club based in Bedok, Singapore, that competes in Singapore Premier League, the top division of football in Singapore. The club was founded in 1973. They played their first league game in 1974, winning the FAS Division Three League which earned them a spot in National Football League Division One the following year. Their most successful period was during the 1980s and 90s, winning six consecutive FAS Premier League titles.

Geylang International has won 2 league titles and 1 Singapore Cup since the inception of a professional league in 1996. Their greatest season was in 1996, when they became the first team to win both the league title and the FA Cup. They also reached the 1997 Singapore FA Cup final, 2001 and 2003 Singapore Cup finals, and the 2012 Singapore League Cup final, finishing as runners-up.

Geylang International has a traditional rivalry with closest neighbour Tampines Rovers. Matches between these two are referred to as the "Eastern Derby" which is known to be one of the best rivalries in Singapore football.

== History ==
=== Beginnings and breakthrough (1973–1995) ===
==== Formation ====
Formally founded by Colin Ng in 1973 during a dinner gathering with Arshad Khamis, Gulam Mohamed and Omar Ashiblie, Ng planned to build a successful club in Singapore. They were soon known as International Contract Specialists Football Club (ICS) and played their first friendly match against Rollel, a Singapore Business Houses Football League (SBHFL) Division One league club on 15 November 1973 with a 2–0 win. They made their season debut in 1974, walking away with 2 titles – FAS Division Three League & President's Cup with no losses. They had several top players including Arshad Khamis, Dollah Kassim, Gulam Mohamed, Samad Allapitchay, Kamal Mohd Nor and Robert Sim.

==== Name change and early success ====
For the 1975 season, in line with the plans of the Football Association of Singapore to streamline the FAS League and have teams based on geographical identity for the new National Football League, ICS changed its name to Geylang Internationals, as their home ground was based at Geylang Field, Lorong 12. They were placed in Division One and won it that year, adding another title in 1976. Their back to back victories was made sweeter by winning the 1976 President's Cup.

==== Revival ====
A relegation in 1981 prompted the arrival of a new management committee that guided the club back to the top division in 1983. In 1984, club president Kasim Chik financed the club and businessman Patrick Ang, who joined in 1986, managed to secure sponsors for them. Despite being relegated that year, they returned to Division 1 of the National Football League the following season.

In 1988, the FAS started a semi-professional league competition called the FAS Premier League as the top tier of the Singapore football league structure. The club's name had remained unchanged until 1987.. Before the start of the FA Premier League, the "s" was dropped and the name became Geylang International.

Geylang International dominated all eight years of the FAS Premier League, winning six consecutive titles from 1988 to 1993 before finishing third in 1994 and second in 1995. Every game would see their home ground packed to the brim as fans clamoured to catch a game of the Eagles’ skilful players. Subsequently, due to the huge fan following which numbered in the thousands, all their games had to be played either in Jalan Besar Stadium or National Stadium.

The success behind winning the FAS Premier League was also aided by the players they had. Notably players such as Malek Awab, Razali Saad, Dollah Kassim, Samad Allapitchay and Robert Sim all contributed to the success of the team. These were players who would also go on to represent the country. It might not be known widely by many but they even managed to attract one of the biggest European stars of that era to turn up in their club's colours. French forward and legend, Michel Platini visited Singapore to attend a football clinic conducted by them and played half a game for the Eagles to highlight the club's attraction.

=== Progressive and golden era (1996–2012) ===
==== Joining the S. League ====
When the FAS formed the fully professional S. League in 1996, Geylang International changed their name to Geylang United Football Club. They were one of the eight teams in the inaugural season of the S.League in 1996. They won the first stage (the Tiger Beer Series) of the league season and finished fifth in the second stage (the Pioneer Series). They won the league after defeating SAFFC (the Pioneer Series champions) 2–1 in the Championship Play-off. They completed the season with another trophy, beating the same team on penalties, 4–2, in the Singapore FA Cup. As the team was full of international stars, led by 1998 Iranian World Cup head coach Jalal Talebi, players such as Fandi Ahmad, Kadir Yahaya, David Lee, Hamid Reza Estili, Mohammad Khakpour, and Chris Riley, Vincent Subramaniam (Head Coach for SAFFC) identified them as the Manchester United of Singapore. As league champions, they qualified for the 1997–98 Asian Club Championship but were eliminated after losing 8–2 on aggregate by Japanese side Kashima Antlers in the first round.

The 1997 season was a disappointing season for them. They failed to defend the S.League title, finishing fifth. The Eagles also failed to defend the FA Cup, after losing to SAFFC in the finals. They did not win any silverware till 2001, when they won their second league title by a close margin. Both forwards, Aleksandar Đurić and Brian Bothwell scored 57 goals for the team. It was the best performing S.League season for the team; scoring 84 goals and conceding 28 goals. Just days after winning the league title, they suffered their worst defeat in history; losing 8–0 to Home United in the Singapore Cup finals. As league champions, they were guaranteed a slot in the qualifying round of the 2002–03 AFC Champions League but were eliminated after losing to Chinese side Shanghai Shenhua 5–1 on aggregate in the second round.

==== AFC Cup debut ====
The 2002 season saw Geylang United finish third in both the S.League and Singapore Cup. They came close to winning their third S.League title and first Singapore Cup in 2003, only to finish runners-up to Home United for both competitions. As runners-up, they qualified to play in the AFC Cup 2004 due to Home United's double. Their debut in the AFC Cup 2004 was an impressive one. Despite losing their opening match, they managed to stay unbeaten for their next five games in the group stage. They went on to qualify for the quarter-finals, beating Malaysian club Perak FA before losing to Syrian side Al-Wahda in the semi-final.

Geylang United won their first Singapore Cup in 2009, beating Thailand side Bangkok Glass 1–0 at the Jalan Besar Stadium. The win ensured them a place in the 2010 AFC Cup where they were placed in Group H alongside Vietnam SHB Da Nang, Thailand club Port and Hong Kong side Tai Po. However, they failed to qualify for the knockout stages, finishing 3rd in the group stages with four draws and two losses.

Weeks before the start of the 2012 season, Patrick Ang announced his retirement as club chairman. Ang, who had been with the club since 1986, moved up the ranks at the club as manager; vice-president; president and eventually chairman. He was given the nickname "Geylang's Godfather" after helping the club to gain main and co-sponsors. Former Singapore international, Leong Kok Fann took over the position. Mike Wong stepped down as coach after their 7–1 thrashing by Home United kept the club at the bottom of the league without a point. Under-21 coach, Vedhamuthu Kanan, swopped roles with Wong. Under the guidance of Kanan, the Eagles made it into the League Cup finals; only to lose in the final to Brunei DPMM. In the league itself, Kanan gave the U21 players the chance to be in the first team. It turned out to be a positive effort as some of these players who were given the chance to play in the S.League matches performed better than some of the first team players. They ended the season second from bottom in the nine-team table.

=== Decline in performances (2013–2016) ===
==== Renamed as Geylang International ====
On 4 January 2013, the club announced in a pre-season press conference that it would change its club logo and name back to Geylang International Football Club. The club has set on a vision statement, playing philosophy and values like discipline and commitment to a six-week training routine planned for the players to follow meanwhile on the community outreach side, there will be a new partnership with Singapore Management University [SMU] Mentorship Programme which includes opportunities to interact with the club players. A vision statement, playing philosophy and values like discipline and commitment have also been clearly set out, and a six-week training routine planned for the players to follow. They started off the season playing against Malaysian club Johor Darul Ta'zim, ATM FA and Selangor losing 1–0, 2–1 and drawing 0–0 respectively. The Eagles then signed three Japanese trios, Takuma Ito, Norihiro Kawakami and Shotaro Ihata however the squad saw plenty of long-term injury crises, forcing their then-assistant coach, former Singapore international,Mohd Noor Ali to come out of retirement. They finished the season in 9th place. On 19 August 2013, they faced the Hong Kong club, Sun Source winning the match 5–0 at the Bedok Stadium.

The 2014 season was something to look out for as Vedhamuthu Kanan flew to Argentina during the pre-season to look for new foreign players. It was later announced that Leonel Felice, Franco Chivilo and Joaquin Lopez had signed a 1-year contract. In addition, Nazareno Velez joined in as assistant coach. The Eagles started off their 2014 pre season friendlies participating in the IFA Shield 2014 in India playing against Kingfisher East Bengal, United Sports Club and Korean Sun Moon University at the Salt Lake Stadium. However, the season did not start well as one of the Argentinian players failed to get their employment pass before the season kicked off. V. Kanan eventually got demoted back to coaching the U-21 team after 3 straight losses. German Jörg Steinebrunner was then appointed as the new head coach 24 hours before their next match. Despite their poor league performance, Steinebrunner almost led the team to the finals of the League Cup and Singapore Cup; only to lose both domestic competitions on penalty shoot-outs. The team ended the 2014 season in eighth place.

In 2015, Steinebrunner took this opportunity to get his players ahead of the new season. The Eagles participated in the 2015 Kata Group Hotel Challenge Cup tournament in Thailand facing Phuket winning 1–3 in the 1st leg and 2–1 in the 2nd leg. They then fly off to Indonesia to face Semen Padang and Felda United of Malaysia in a friendly match. The Eagles were inconsistent throughout the season, failing to win most of their matches. After their defeat in the semi-finals of the League Cup, they failed to collect any points for six consecutive games, remaining rooted to the bottom of the table for months. An unbeaten run in their last five matches with 3 wins and 2 draws allowed them to finish one place off the bottom.

==== New club chairman ====
Weeks after the 2015 S.League season ended, it was announced that Ben Teng would replace Leong Kok Fann as club chairman. Ben Teng and his new management committee (comprising mainly Singaporeans who have worked in Dubai/Abu Dhabi previously) set about to revamp the club by recruiting young players from the disbanded LionsXII and Courts Young Lions, anchored by seasoned players such as Daniel Bennett and Indra Sahdan. Four players, Hairul Syirhan, Yuki Ichikawa, Nor Azli Yusoff and Shawal Anuar from the 2015 season were retained. In line with the club's philosophy of promoting young players from within, four Prime League players were promoted to the senior team (one was subsequently released to Young Lions at the request of FAS). The new 2016 squad also featured returning former Geylang Prime League players such as Stanely Ng, Amy Recha and Taufiq Ghani. Former Singapore international and championship winner with the 2001 Geylang team, Hasrin Jailani, was appointed as head coach. His teammate from the 2001 winning team, Mohd Noor Ali, was appointed as assistant head coach and Prime League coach. In its first S-League away match of the 2016 season against title favourites Tampines Rovers, the Eagles recovered from an early 2–0 lead by the hosts to lead 2–3 before an 86th-minute equaliser by the hosts. Geylang International finished 5th out of the 9 teams competing in the 2016 S league.

=== 2017–present ===
==== Mohd Noor Ali as head coach ====
In June 2017, Mohd Noor Ali took over as head coach of Geylang International, managing the team he had won the 2001 S league with as a player. The Eagles played their pre season friendlies against Malaysian club, Johor Darul Ta'zim, Melaka United, and Petaling Jaya Rangers before returning home to face Philippines club, Ceres–Negros and Australian club, Rydalmere Lions winning 3–1 in the process at the Bedok Stadium. The Eagles improved on their previous position and attained 4th position in the 2017 S league. It was Geylang International's first top four finish in 14 years

In 2018, Mohd Noor Ali went abroad for a 1-year coaching stint with Japanese club Matsumoto Yamaga (as part of Geylang International's collaboration with their sponsor Epson). Noor Ali's venture abroad meant Hirotaka Usui took charge of The Eagles for the inaugural 2018 Singapore Premier League. Geylang International finished in a disappointing 8th position that season.

In 2019, Mohd Noor Ali returned to Geylang International after guiding Yamaga's “B” team to a league title. The Eagles welcomed new players like former Dutch U-20 Barry Maguire, and retained a strong youthful core in Darren Teh and Zikos Chua, and Azril Suhaili. Zikos Chua scored vital late goals during the season, as the Eagles finished 5th place in the 2019 Singapore Premier League. That season, The Eagles also knocked out defending champions Albirex Niigata (S) en route to finishing 3rd in the 2019 Singapore Cup. The Eagles beat the 2019 Singapore Premier League champions, Brunei DPMM, in the 3rd/4th placing match 12–11 on penalties, after the match ended 2–2.

After beating title favourites Lion City Sailors 1–0 in their opening game of 2022, Geylang went on an 11-game winless run despite putting in commendable performances. The newly revamped Geylang squad for 2022, consisting of a new group of foreign players - Vincent Bezecourt, Šime Žužul, Rio Sakuma, Takahiro Tezuka had to find a way to get back to winning ways. When Round 2 and 3 of the 2022 Singapore Premier League came around, Geylang International picked up form, picking up 5 wins in 6 games. By beating the Lion City Sailors 3–1 in the final round of matches (Round 4), and ending the season with a 1–1 draw with eventual champions Albirex Niigata (S), Geylang International finished the season 4th, matching their 4th-place finish in 2020. As a result, the Eagles secured the second and final AFC Cup berth.

==== Collaboration with City Football Group ====
In February 2023, Geylang International and City Football Group (CFG) formalized a collaboration agreement to further develop the Eagles, making it the first Southeast Asian team to be associated with CFG, which owns English Premier League club Manchester City. Geylang club adviser Ben Teng, who was also the club's chairman from 2015 to 2020, played a key role in securing the deal. The partnership has already reaped benefits as CFG's Football Operations department helped Geylang to bring in striker Yushi Yamaya for the 2023 season, a former academy player of Yokohama F. Marinos, J-League champions and part of the CFG family.

==== Stale performances ====
Geylang International started off the 2023 season in a Malaysia tour competing in the Harapan Cup in which they lost 4–0 to Penang and 1–2 to Kedah Darul Aman.

In preparation for the inaugural two years league cycle 2024–25 season, Geylang International turned their attention towards Japanese national signing Keito Hariya, Ryoya Taniguchi, 2021 Singapore Premier League 'Player of the Year' winner, Tomoyuki Doi and also loaning in youngster, Sora Tanaka from partnership club, Matsumoto Yamaga. The Eagles also retained Japanese duo, Rio Sakuma and Takahiro Tezuka while Vincent Bezecourt remained the only European foreign in the club. Geylang International started off their season getting 10 points with 2 wins, 4 draws and 0 losses in their first six matches where the club also ended Lion City Sailors winning streak making them drop points in their first four matches. The club also went on to beat Albirex Niigata (S) in a 6–0 win on 6 July 2024, where Tomoyuki Doi went on to score 3 hat tricks in 7 league matches. On 7 March 2025, Tomuyuki Doi went on to score his 39 league goal surpassing the all-time league record goalscorer of 38 goals set by Mirko Grabovac in 2001.

Japanese players Tomuyuki Doi, Rio Sakuma and Takahiro Tezuka would go on to leave the club. Geylang International then shifts their attention to finding Japanese players to replace the outgoing players; the club sign Riku Fukashiro, Kaisei Ogawa, Shodai Yokoyama, and Shuhei Hoshino ahead of the 2025–26 season. Geylang International also signed Hougang United captain Nazrul Nazari, and Serbian Nikola Ignjatovic for the new season.

== Team image ==
=== Supporters ===
==== Ultra Eagles ====
Supporters are known as the Ultras Eagles. Typically dressed in black and green, they are known for their use of drums and vocal support, contributing to a distinctive matchday atmosphere. The supporters have developed a close relationship with the team, which is reflected in post-match traditions. Following each game, regardless of the result, the Ultras, players, and coaching staff participate together in a shared song.

=== Official anthem ===
Geylang International Football Club's Official Anthem, "We Are The Mighty Eagles" was launched on 22 February 2022. The anthem is played at all home matches, before kick-off, at half-time, and whenever the Eagles score a goal. The anthem is composed by Evil Singing Pandas, a band from Singapore and Bangkok, Thailand.

The anthem is also being used in various videos promoting the club, including a behind the scenes pre-season photoshoot and tribute clip to the main sponsor Epson in 2022.

== Stadiums ==
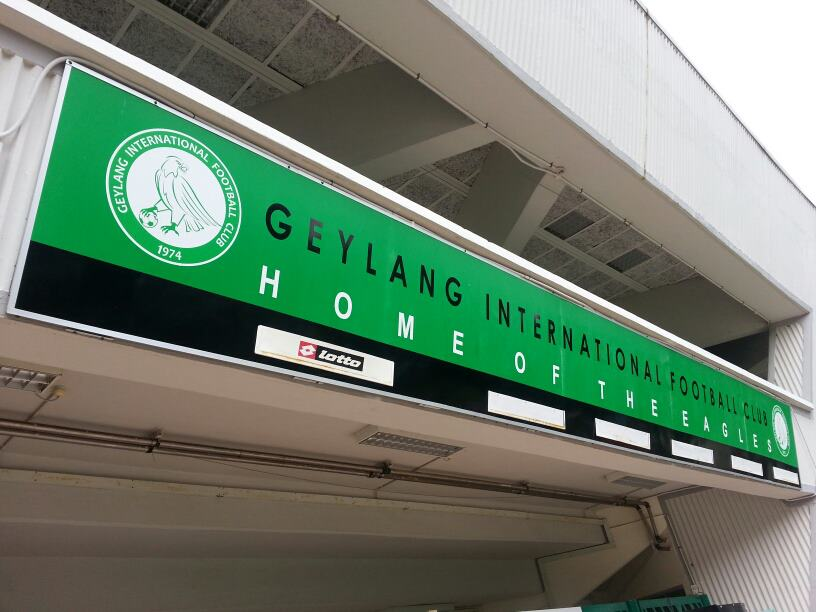
Bedok Stadium Entrance

=== Bedok Stadium ===
The Eagles’ home ground is the Bedok Stadium, located in the eastern part of Singapore. It is used both for football matches and community events. Besides that, the pitch is also used by the club for their training sessions. The stadium has a natural grass football pitch, an 8-lane running track and some athletic facilities. The stadiums are closed to the public during official events and S.League matches. The stadium can hold up to 3,800 spectators. The stadium is currently managed by the Singapore Sports Council.

=== Our Tampines Hub ===
The Eagles’ home ground moved to Our Tampines Hub for the 2019 Singapore Premier League season, which they share with Tampines Rovers.

Geylang International players train at the Geylang Training Centre in which is mainly used by the Singapore national team.

== Kit suppliers and shirt sponsors ==
Period	Kit	Main Sponsor
1996	(Italy) Diadora	(Japan) Hitachi
1997	(Italy) Diadora	(United States) Hewlett-Packard
1998	(Italy) Diadora	(Singapore) Akira
1999–2002	(United States) Nike	(Singapore) Ponggol Marina
2003	(United States) Nike	No sponsors
2004–2006	(Singapore) Pan	(Singapore) Akira
2007–2008	(Italy) Diadora	(Singapore) Five Stars Tours
2009	(Italy) Lotto	(Singapore) Five Stars Tours
2010–2013	(Italy) Lotto	No sponsors
2014	(Italy) Lotto	(Singapore) Rotary Engineering
2015	(Singapore) Dreamatron	No sponsors
2016	(Singapore) THORB	(Japan) Epson
2017–2022	(Thailand) FBT	(Japan) Epson
2023	(Thailand) FBT	(Australia) Rolos
2024–2025	(Thailand) FBT	(Singapore) Vector Green
2025–present	(Thailand) FBT	(Singapore) Emerald Eagles

== Affiliated clubs ==
- (Japan) Matsumoto Yamaga (2016–present)

On 23 November, 2016, Geylang International and Matsumoto Yamaga signed a Memorandum of Understanding (MOU) in a press event that was held earlier today at the Marina Bay Floating Platform. This MOU will enable both clubs to establish a platform to exchange expertise and knowledge with the objective of promoting cohesion and development of football between the two clubs. The MOU spells out possible areas of collaboration such as the exchange of players and technical staff for training attachments and loans. Geylang will be looking to select promising players from its Active SG-GIFC Soccer Academy and junior teams to send on short training stints with Matsumoto Yamaga while the Japanese club is also looking into the possibility of sending players from their junior team to Singapore for pre-season training stints. Among the key initiatives of the partnership with Matsumoto Yamaga is the exchange program for head coach, Mohd Noor Ali, who had a one-year attachment with the Japanese side in 2018, where he guided their B team to the Japan FA's Under-18 Football League Nagano prefecture title on 17 August 2018, Anders Aplin become the first Singaporean football player to sign for a J.League team signing on loan until the end of the 2018 J2 League season in November.

On 30 October 2022, both clubs reaffirmed their close and long-standing relationship as the club officials went to Japan to explore future collaborations going into the seventh year of partnership since 2016. Geylang International has a memorandum of understanding with J.League outfits, Matsumoto Yamaga that was signed in 2016, while Epson's relationship with the club also dates back to the same year when it became the club's platinum sponsor. In the past seven years, Epson has enjoyed premium hospitality access to the club's home matches and has also supported the local football community and youths with the staging of the Epson Youth Cup.

- (Vietnam) Ho Chi Minh City (2019–present)

Geylang International and V.League, Ho Chi Minh City has signed a Memorandum of Understanding (MOU) that aims to further the growth of football through the open sharing of technical expertise and knowledge between both clubs. Under this MOU, cooperative efforts between both clubs will be boosted in four key sectors; training, attachments, player transfers, and fan club support. It will also allow the two clubs to send their youth and senior squad to train or participate in short-term tournaments within each other's regions. The agreement will also ensure the priority of players’ transfer for both clubs as well as facilitate the exchange of players and technical staff for training attachments. Additionally, both parties will strive to increase each other's club profile in their regions and encourage cultural exchanges and interactions between their fan clubs. This includes providing support, privileges, and on-site concierge services for official club tours, visits, or match attendances requested by each other's fan clubs through their respective clubs.

- City Football Group (2023–present)

On 1 February, 2023, Geylang International had become the first Southeast Asian club to partner with the group. The agreement is set to be an initial, highly targeted collaboration, with the potential to evolve into a broader, more comprehensive strategic partnership in the future. The commitment will enable the club to start tapping into CFG's football expertise and technology, allowing the club to improve its structure and operations.

== Players ==
As of 15 September 2026

=== First-team squad ===
Note: Flags indicate national team as defined under FIFA eligibility rules; some limited exceptions apply. Players may hold more than one non-FIFA nationality.

No.	Pos.	Nation	Player
1	GK	SRB	Miloš Čupić
2	DF	SGP	Darren Teh
3	DF	KOR	Cho Eun-su
4	DF	PRK	Kim Tae-uk
5	MF	JPN	Naoki Yoshioka
6	MF	SGP	Anumanthan Kumar
7	MF	JPN	Kaisei Ogawa
8	MF	SGP	Joshua Pereira (captain)
9	DF	MNE	Dejan Račić
10	FW	JPN	Ryoya Taniguchi
11	DF	SGP	Harith Kanadi
13	GK	SGP	Aniq Matin ^{U21}
15	DF	SGP	SC Denilson ^{U21}

No.	Pos.	Nation	Player
17	MF	SGP	Prince Rio Rifae'i ^{U21}
18	FW	PRK	Ryang Hyon-ju
19	MF	SGP	Raiyan Noor ^{U21}
21	MF	SGP	Ryu Hardy ^{U23}
22	MF	SGP	Nur Ikhsanuddin ^{U21}
23	DF	SGP	Nazrul Nazari
24	MF	PHI	Diego Aspiras
25	GK	SGP	Dylan Pereira Singh
30	MF	USA	Milan Landreman
32	FW	SGP	Sahil Suhaimi
37	MF	USA	Daniel Serrano

=== Reserve League (SPL2) squad ===
Note: Flags indicate national team as defined under FIFA eligibility rules; some limited exceptions apply. Players may hold more than one non-FIFA nationality.

No.	Pos.	Nation	Player
17	FW	SGP	Hairil Sufi
26	DF	SGP	Nizwan Izzairie ^{U21}
31	GK	SGP	Naufal Affandi ^{U21}
32	MF	ENG	Timothy Cheng ^{FP U21}
33	DF	SGP	Kyan Neo ^{U21}
34	FW	NOR	Abdusukur Abduryim ^{FP U23}
35	GK	SGP	Azakhir Azali ^{U21}

No.	Pos.	Nation	Player
36	MF	SGP	Shaquille Danish ^{U21}
40	MF	SGP	Sachin Dev Balamurali ^{U21}
42	FW	SGP	Adam Irfan ^{U21}
44	DF	SGP	Irfan Rifqi ^{U21}
48	DF	JPN	Sho Gamoh ^{FP U21}
50	MF	SGP	Raoul Hadid ^{U21}

=== Players on loan ===
Note: Flags indicate national team as defined under FIFA eligibility rules; some limited exceptions apply. Players may hold more than one non-FIFA nationality.

No.	Pos.	Nation	Player
53	MF	SGP	Muthukumaran Navaretthinam (National Service till 2025)
68	DF	SGP	Ilhan Noor (National Service till 2025, to Young Lions)
54	DF	SGP	Kieran Teo (National Service till 2025, to Young Lions)
55	DF	SGP	Syafi Suhaimi (National Service till 2027)
57	DF	SGP	Hud Ismail (National Service till 2027)
25	DF	SGP	Ahmad Munthaha Sriwaluya (National Service till 2028)

== Management and staff ==
In February 2020, Thomas Gay, co-founder and deputy chairman of Goodrich Global Pte Ltd, and the club's vice-chairman for the last two years, took over from Ben Teng as the chairman of Geylang International. Ben Teng remained as the Eagles' club adviser and continues to oversee their strategic direction, specifically in the building of alliances with overseas clubs.

Thomas Gay was appointed chairman of Geylang International in February 2020, succeeding Ben Teng. Prior to his appointment, Gay had served as the club's vice-chairman for two years. He was also the co-founder and deputy chairman of Goodrich Global, and brought his business experience into the club's management. During his tenure, Geylang continued to develop its commercial and sporting partnerships, including its relationship with Epson and a partnership with fitness and wellness group True Group. The club also maintained a focus on youth and player development, while competing consistently in the Singapore Premier League. Geylang finished fourth in the 2020 season, sixth in 2021, fifth in 2022 and fifth in 2023, before finishing third in the 2024–25 season. Gay remained chairman through the club's 50th anniversary celebrations in November 2024 and the 2025–26 season, before being succeeded by Desmond Gay in 2026.

Desmond Gay succeeded Thomas Gay as chairman of Geylang International in 2026, having previously served as the club's vice-chairman. He is the chairman of JGL Worldwide Group, a logistics and supply-chain company with operations across Southeast Asia. Under his chairmanship, Geylang underwent significant changes to its playing squad, football operations and management structure ahead of the 2026–27 Singapore Premier League season. The club appointed additional technical staff, including a dedicated strength and conditioning coach and a first-team analyst, while expanding its first-team squad. Gay stated that the club's plans would require significant investment and that his aim was to build Geylang as a long-term institution that could be a source of pride for both its supporters and Singapore. The new management set its sights on returning the club to continental competition, with head coach Noor Ali targeting a top-three league finish and qualification for Asian competition.

=== Management ===
Position	Name
Chairman	Desmond Gay
Vice-Chairman	David Hia
Vice-Chairman	Aaron Kok
Club Advisor	Goh Pei Ming
Club Patron	Ben Teng
Club Patron	Thomas Gay
Honorary Secretary	Derick Ting
Honorary Treasurer	Tan Kian Tiong
General Manager	David Hia

=== Technical staff ===
Position	Name
Head Coach	(Singapore) Mohd Noor Ali
Assistant Coach	(Singapore) Hasrin Jailani
Goalkeeper Coach	(Singapore) Yusri Aziz
Sports Trainer	(Singapore) Haizal Sufri
Women’s Team Sports Trainer	(Singapore) Redzuan Abdullah
SPL2 head coach	(Singapore) Andi Agus
Set Piece Analyst	(Singapore) Rudie Imran Masih
Fitness & Conditioning Coach	(Malaysia) Mohd Khairulanwar Isa

== Honours ==
Type	Competition	Titles	Seasons
League	Singapore Premier League	2	1996, 2001
League	FAS Premier League	6	1988, 1989, 1990, 1991, 1992, 1993
League	National Football League Division One	3	1975, 1976, 1977
League	FAS Division Three	1	1974
Cup	Singapore Cup	1	2009
Cup	Singapore FA Cup	2	1996, 2007
Cup	Singapore League Cup 'Plate Winners'	1	2016
Cup	President's Cup	6	1974, 1976, 1978, 1990, 1991, 1995
Others	Prime League	3	1998, 2006, 2011

Bold is for those competition that are currently active.

== Award winners ==
=== Domestic ===
- League Player of the Year
  - (Japan) Tomoyuki Doi (2024–25)
- League Young Player of the Year
  - (Singapore) Robin Chitrakar (1996)
  - (Singapore) Ahmad Latiff (1997)
  - (Singapore) Indra Sahdan (2000, 2001)
  - (Singapore) Baihakki Khaizan (2003)
- League Coach of the Year
  - (South Korea) Jang Jung (2001)
  - (Australia) Scott O'Donell (2003)
- League Player of the Year
  - (Japan) Tomoyuki Doi (2024–25)
- League Goal of the Year
  - (Netherlands) Barry Maguire against Young Lions 20 August 2019
  - (Singapore) Khairul Nizam against Tampines Rovers on 7 November 2020
- League Golden Gloves
  - (Singapore) Zaiful Nizam (2022)
- League Team of the Year
  - (Singapore) Shawal Anuar (2019)
  - (Singapore) Joshua Pereira (2022)
  - (Singapore) Zaiful Nizam (2022)
  - (France) Vincent Bezecourt (2022, 2024–25)
  - (Japan) Tomoyuki Doi (2024–25)

== Records and statistics ==
As of 13 September 2026.

=== Top 10 all-time appearances ===
Rank	Player	Years	Club appearances
1	(Japan) Yuki Ichikawa	2014–2021	205
2	(Singapore) Shah Hirul	2008–2015	161
5	(Singapore) Amy Recha	2011–2013, 2016–2017, 2019–2021, 2026	145
3	(Singapore) Syed Thaha	2004-2005 2007–2011 2015	142
4	(Singapore) Yazid Yasin	2009–2012, 2015–2016	139
6	(Singapore) Syed Fadhil	1997–2002 2004–2007 2010–2012	121
7	(Singapore) Hafiz Rahim	2003–2004 2006–2011	112
8	(Singapore) Shawal Anuar	2014–2019	111
9	(Singapore) Joshua Pereira	2020–present	104
10	(France) Vincent Bezecourt	2021–2026	102

=== Top 10 all-time scorers ===
Rank	Player	Club appearances	Total goals
1	(Slovakia) Jozef Kapláň	95	54
2	(Japan) Tomoyuki Doi	35	50
3	(Singapore) Shawal Anuar	111	32
4	(France) Vincent Bezecourt	102	31
5	(Singapore) Amy Recha	145	30
6	(Japan) Ryoya Taniguchi	58	24
7	(Singapore) Masrezwan Masturi	80	22
8	(Croatia) Šime Žužul	29	19
9	(Japan) Bruno Suzuki	32	18
10	(South Korea) Kim Jae-hong	66	17

- Biggest wins: 0–9 vs Sengkang Marine (On 18 July 2002)
- Heaviest defeats: 0–8 vs Lion City Sailors (On 11 April 2021)
- Youngest goal scorers: Zikos Chua ~ 16 years 11 months 30 days old (On 14 April 2019 vs Young Lions)
- Oldest goal scorers: Daniel Bennett ~ 38 years 9 months 18 days old (25 October 2016 vs Home United)
- Youngest ever debutant: Zikos Chua ~ 16 years 2 months 19 days old (On 4 July 2018 vs Young Lions)
- Oldest ever player: Daniel Bennett ~ 38 years 09 months 18 days old (On 25 October 2016 vs Home United)

== Notable players/managers ==
=== Players ===
- (Australia) PJ Roberts
- Hamid Reza Estili (The former Iranian international left Geylang after two years with the club and would go on to seal his name in world football history when he scored in Iran's 2–1 win over United States in the 1998 FIFA World Cup)
- Mohammad Khakpour (Leaving Singapore after that season, Khakpour went on to captain the Iran national team at the 1998 FIFA World Cup)
- (Singapore) Fandi Ahmad
- (Singapore) Kadir Yahaya
- (Singapore) David Lee
- (Singapore) Amy Recha
- (New Zealand) Chris Riley
- (Germany) Lutz Pfannenstiel
- (France) Vincent Bezecourt
- (Japan) Yuki Ichikawa
- (Japan) Yushi Yamaya
- (Japan) Tomoyuki Doi

=== Coach ===
- Jalal Talebi (Managed Iran at the 1998 FIFA World Cup)
- (South Korea) Jang Jung

=== International capped players ===
AFC/OFC.: (Australia) Danny Kim; (Australia) Warren Spink; (India) Abneet Bharti; (Iran) Hamid Estili; (Iran) Mohammad Khakpour; (Iran) Mohsen Garousi; (South Korea) Jang Jo-yoon; (South Korea) Jang Jung; (Philippines) Mark Hartmann; (New Zealand) Chris Riley; (New Zealand) Gareth Rowe; (New Zealand) Gavin Wilkinson; (New Zealand) Jason Batty; (New Zealand) Matthew Palmer; (North Korea) Ryang Hyon-ju; (Thailand) Pitipong Kuldilok; (Thailand) Rangsan Viwatchaichok; (Thailand) Surachai Jirasirichote; (Timor-Leste) Adriano Quintão	CAF.: (Cape Verde) Gilson Varela; (Ghana) Kim Grant; (Guinea) Ballamodou Conde	UEFA.: (England) Rhema Obed; (Germany) Lutz Pfannenstiel; (Republic of Ireland) Wayne O'Sullivan; (Montenegro) Dejan Račić; (Netherlands) Barry Maguire	CONMEBOL/ CONCACAF. – NIL –

== Club captains ==
Year	Captain
1974	(Singapore) Gulam Mohammad
1975	(Singapore) TBC
1976	(Singapore) TBC
1977	(Singapore) TBC
1978	(Singapore) TBC
1979	(Singapore) TBC
1980	(Singapore) TBC
1981	(Singapore) TBC
1982	(Singapore) TBC
1983	(Singapore) TBC
1984	(Singapore) TBC
1985	(Singapore) TBC
1986	(Singapore) TBC
1987	(Singapore) TBC
1988–1995	(Singapore) Razali Saad

Year	Captain
1996	(Singapore) Fandi Ahmad
1997	(Singapore) TBC
1998	(Singapore) TBC
1999	(Singapore) TBC
2000	(Singapore) TBC
2001	(Singapore) TBC
2002	(Singapore) TBC
2003	(Singapore) TBC
2004	(Singapore) TBC
2005	(Singapore) TBC

Year	Captain
2006	(Singapore) TBC
2007	(Singapore) TBC
2008	(Singapore) TBC
2009	(Singapore) TBC
2010	(Singapore) TBC
2011	(Singapore) TBC
2012	(Singapore) Yazid Yasin
2013	(Slovakia) Jozef Kaplan
2014	(Singapore) Ridhuan Muhammad
2015	(Slovakia) Jozef Kaplan
2016–2017	(Singapore) Isa Halim
2018	(Singapore) Anders Aplin
2019	(Singapore) Darren Teh
2020–2021	(Japan) Yuki Ichikawa
2022	(Singapore) Zaiful Nizam
2023–present	(Singapore) Joshua Pereira

== Managerial history ==
=== Performance by coach ===
The following table provides a summary of the coach appointed by the club.

Manager	Season	Achievements
(Singapore) Andrew Yap	1973 – 1974	
(Malaysia) Haji Ahmad Bakri Fahrin	1974 – 1976	– 1974, 1976 President's Cup – 1974 FAS Division Three – 1975, 1976 National Football League Division One
(Singapore) Dennis Bent	1977 – 1978	– 1977 National Football League Division One
(Singapore) Cheng Meng Sak	1979	– 1978 President's Cup
(Australia) Zayid Ramsay	1980 – 1988	– 1988 FAS Premier League
(Singapore) Ibrahim Awang	1989	– 1989 FAS Premier League
(Singapore) Sulaiman Karim	1989 – 1991	– 1989, 1990, 1991 FAS Premier League – 1991 President's Cup
(Singapore) Subhash Singh	1991 – 1994	– 1992, 1993 FAS Premier League
(Singapore) Vincent Subramaniam	1994 – 1995	– 1995 President's Cup
=== S.League ===
(Iran) Jalal Talebi	1 January 1996 – 12 March 1997	– 1996 S.League – 1996 Singapore FA Cup
(Singapore) Robert Lim	13 March 1997 – 14 October 1997	
(New Zealand) Douglas Moore	15 October 1997 – 31 December 1998	
(New Zealand) Alan Vest	1 January 1999 – 26 July 2000	
(Singapore) Seak Poh Leong	17 July 2000 – 31 December 2000	
(South Korea) Jang Jung	1 January 2001 – 31 December 2001	– 2001 S.League
(Singapore) Seak Poh Leong (2)	1 January 2002 – 26 August 2002	
(South Korea) Jang Jung (2)	27 August 2002 – 30 November 2002	
(Australia) Scott O'Donell	1 January 2003 – 31 May 2005)	
(Singapore) Seak Poh Leong (3)	1 June 2005 – 31 December 2005	
(Thailand) Attaphol Buspakom	1 January 2006 – 8 August 2006	
(Singapore) Lim Tong Hai	9 August 2006 – 4 October 2007	
(Slovakia) Joseph Herel	1 January 2008 – 22 October 2008	
(Singapore) Lim Tong Hai (2)	23 October 2008 – 31 October 2008	
(Singapore) Mike Wong	1 January 2009 – 16 March 2012	
(Singapore) Kanan Vedhamuthu	17 March 2012 – 19 March 2014	
(Germany) Jörg Steinebrunner	21 March 2014 – 31 December 2015	
(Singapore) Hasrin Jailani	1 January 2016 – 20 June 2017	
(Singapore) Mohd Noor Ali	20 June 2017 – 1 February 2018	
=== Singapore Premier League ===
(Japan) Hirotaka Usui	1 February 2018 – 29 September 2018	
(Singapore) Mohd Noor Ali (2)	21 December 2019 – present	

== Season by season record ==
Season	League	Pos.	P	W	D	L	GS	GA	Pts	Singapore Cup	League Cup
1996-1	S.League	1st	14	9	1	4	27	14	28		
1996-2	S.League	5th	14	6	3	5	20	16	21		
1997	S.League	5th	16	6	7	3	23	18	25		
1998	S.League	3rd	20	11	5	4	32	18	38	Group stage	
1999	S.League	4th	22	9	8	5	33	21	35	Quarter-finals	
2000	S.League	3rd	22	13	2	7	42	29	41	Third place	
2001	S.League	1st	33	23	7	3	84	28	76	Runners-up	
2002	S.League	3rd	33	17	8	8	80	39	59	Third place	
2003	S.League	2nd	33	21	3–2	7	75	30	71	Runners-up	
2004	S.League	7th	27	10	7	10	43	43	37	Semi-finals	
2005	S.League	8th	27	7	5	15	38	57	26	Preliminary	
2006	S.League	10th	30	6	5	19	22	62	23	Round of 16	
2007	S.League	6th	33	10	9	14	43	44	39	Round of 16	Withdrew
2008	S.League	6th	33	13	6	14	56	57	45	Round of 16	Round of 16
2009	S.League	6th	30	12	4	14	36	39	40	Winners	Quarter-finals
2010	S.League	5th	33	12	11	10	32	30	47	Round of 16	Quarter-finals
2011	S.League	8th	33	13	2	18	43	63	41	Round of 16	Quarter-finals
2012	S.League	11th	24	5	6	13	28	50	21	Round of 16	Runners-up
2013	S.League	9th	27	8	8	11	31	38	32	Quarter-finals	Quarter-finals
2014	S.League	8th	27	8	8	11	33	34	32	Quarter-finals	Semi-finals
2015	S.League	8th	27	7	7	13	36	44	28	Quarter-finals	Semi-finals
2016	S.League	5th	24	10	7	7	35	29	37	Quarter-finals	Group stage
2017	S.League	4th	24	11	3	10	32	37	36	Preliminary	Semi-finals
2018	Singapore Premier League	8th	24	5	5	14	26	57	20	Quarter-finals	
2019	Singapore Premier League	5th	24	10	3	11	41	48	33	Third place	
2020	Singapore Premier League	4th	14	6	2	6	18	22	20		
2021	Singapore Premier League	6th	21	6	2	13	33	52	20		
2022	Singapore Premier League	4th	28	10	9	9	48	46	39	Group stage	
2023	Singapore Premier League	5th	24	10	3	11	41	52	33	Group stage	
2024–25	Singapore Premier League	3rd	32	15	9	8	97	64	54	Group stage	
2025–26	Singapore Premier League	5th	21	7	3	11	29	42	24	Group stage	

- The 1996 season of the S.League was split into two series. Tiger Beer Series winners Geylang United defeated Pioneer Series winners Singapore Armed Forces in the Championship playoff to clinch the S.League title.
- 2003 saw the introduction of penalty shoot-outs if a match ended in a draw in regular time. Winners of penalty shoot-outs gained two points instead of one.

== Continental record ==
Season	Competition	Round	Opponents	Home	Away	Aggregate
2002-03	AFC Champions League	Qualifying Zone 2 Round 4	(China) Shanghai Shenhua	3–0	2–1	5–1
2004	AFC Cup	Group E	(India) East Bengal	2–3	1–1	2nd out of 4
2004	AFC Cup	Group E	(Maldives) Island FC	1–0	0–5	2nd out of 4
2004	AFC Cup	Group E	(Malaysia) Negeri Sembilan	2–1	0–1	2nd out of 4
2004	AFC Cup	Quarter-finals	(Malaysia) Perak FA	3–2	1–2	3–5
2004	AFC Cup	Semi-finals	(Syria) Al-Wahda	0–1	1–1	2–1
2010	AFC Cup	Group H	(Hong Kong) Tai Po	1–1	1–1	3rd out of 4
2010	AFC Cup	Group H	(Vietnam) SHB Đà Nẵng	1–1	3–2	3rd out of 4
2010	AFC Cup	Group H	(Thailand) Thai Port	0–1	2–2	3rd out of 4
2021	AFC Cup	Group I	(Malaysia) Terengganu	Cancelled		
2021	AFC Cup	Group I	(Cambodia) Visakha	Cancelled		
2021	AFC Cup	Group I	(Timor-Leste) Lalenok United	Cancelled		

== Performance in AFC competitions ==
- AFC Champions League: 1 appearance

2002–03: Qualifying East – 3rd Round

- Asian Club Championship: 4 appearances

1989: Qualifying Stage
1990: Qualifying Stage
1991: Qualifying Stage
1998: First Round

- AFC Cup: 2 appearances

2004: Semi-finals
2010: Group stage

- Asian Cup Winners Cup: 2 appearances

1990/91: First Round
1991/92: First Round

== Media controversies ==
=== 2016 Post-season issues ===
On 7 November 2016, The Straits Times reported that Geylang International will not pay two of their players' December salaries. Former Singapore national captain Indra Sahdan and Carlos Delgado were affected. It is believed that the club docked Indra's salary as it is displeased that he missed many training sessions while Delgado had some disagreement with the management over money. Club chairman, Ben Teng revealed that as many as 12 players signed two-year full-time contracts at the beginning of this season. The management committee made most of the decisions regarding the handing out of contracts last season, before Teng came on board to replace Leong Kok Fann. Teng added that he has spoken to all the players and will intend to honour their contracts. In addition, some players, who supplemented their income by driving for Uber, have been ordered to stop such off-field activity. Teng revealed his concern and decided to impose a ban on such activities. The players have signed declarations that they do not have other employment outside of football. As professional, players should be focused on raising our playing standards and should not be distracted by off-field activities.

=== 2018 Foreign Players Recruitment ===
On 13 February 2018, Geylang International attempted to recruit foreign players online. The advertisement was swiftly removed once the public took notice of it. Despite this, Geylang International continued to boast a crop of talented foreign players. Japanese central defender and fan favourite Yuki Ichikawa played in his 7th season with Geylang International during the 2020 Singapore Premier League season. Yuki will be remembered for scoring the dramatic last minute winner against his former club Albirex Niigata in the first game of the Eagles' 2019 season. Barry Maguire also starred for The Eagles in the 2019 season, scoring a tremendous long range goal against the Young Lions, winning the 2019 Singapore Premier League Goal of the Year award.
