= Football at the 1983 SEA Games =

1983 SEA Games Football
Tournament details
- Host country: Singapore
- Dates: 28 May – 6 June
- Teams: 7
- Venue: 1 (in 1 host city)

Final positions
- Champions: Thailand (4th title)
- Runners-up: Singapore
- Third place: Malaysia
- Fourth place: Brunei

Tournament statistics
- Matches played: 13
- Goals scored: 39 (3 per match)

Football was contested as part of the programme for the 1983 Southeast Asian Games which was hosted in Singapore from 28 May to 6 June 1983. It was the 12th edition of the men's football tournament at the multi-sport event organised by the SEA Games Federation Committee.

The football tournament began with the first matches of the group stage on 28 May 1983 and ended with the gold medal match on 6 June 1983. Defending champions Thailand and hosts Singapore contested the final. Thailand defeated Singapore 2–1 to win the gold medal. In the bronze medal match, Malaysia defeated Brunei 5–0.

== Background ==
Football had been part of the Southeast Asian Games programme following the debut of the men's competition at the inaugural 1959 SEAP Games in Thailand. Thailand were the defending champions after defeating Malaysia 2–1 in the gold medal match at the previous edition in 1981. Burma were the most successful team having won the gold medal five times previously.

== Format ==
In total, seven teams took part in the competition. They were drawn into two single round robin groups – one of four teams and one of three teams. The winners and runners-up would then contest the semi-finals which would decide the teams contesting the gold and bronze medal matches.

=== Participants ===
- Brunei
- Burma
- Indonesia
- Malaysia
- Philippines
- Singapore
- Thailand

== Venue ==
Matches were played at the National Stadium in Singapore.

== Group stage ==
=== Group A ===
Singapore and Malaysia advanced to the semi-finals.

==== Table ====
Pos	Team	Pld	W	D	L	GF	GA	GD	Pts	Qualification
1	Singapore	2	2	0	0	7	1	+6	4	Advance to semi-finals
2	Malaysia	2	0	1	1	1	2	−1	1	Advance to semi-finals
3	Philippines	2	0	1	1	0	5	−5	1	

==== Matches ====
28 May 1983

Singapore	2–1	Malaysia

National Stadium, Singapore

30 May 1983

Philippines	0–0	Malaysia

National Stadium, Singapore

1 June 1983

Singapore	5–0	Philippines

National Stadium, Singapore

=== Group B ===
Thailand and Brunei advanced to the semi-finals.

==== Table ====
Pos	Team	Pld	W	D	L	GF	GA	GD	Pts	Qualification
1	Thailand	3	2	0	1	7	2	+5	4	Advance to semi-finals
2	Brunei	3	1	1	1	4	4	0	3	Advance to semi-finals
3	Indonesia	3	1	1	1	3	7	−4	3	
4	Burma	3	1	0	2	3	4	−1	2	

==== Matches ====
29 May 1983

Thailand	5–0	Indonesia

National Stadium, Singapore
29 May 1983

Burma	1–2	Brunei

National Stadium, Singapore

31 May 1983

Indonesia	2–1	Burma

National Stadium, Singapore
31 May 1983

Thailand	2–1	Brunei

National Stadium, Singapore

2 June 1983

Burma	1–0	Thailand

National Stadium, Singapore
2 June 1983

Indonesia	1–1	Brunei

National Stadium, Singapore

== Semi-finals ==
Singapore defeated Brunei and Thailand defeated Malaysia on penalties to advance to the gold medal match.

4 June 1983

Singapore	4–0	Brunei

National Stadium, Singapore
4 June 1983

Thailand	1–1 (a.e.t.)	Malaysia
Penalties
	3–0

National Stadium, Singapore

== Bronze medal match ==
Malaysia defeated Brunei to win the bronze medal.

5 June 1983

Malaysia	5–0	Brunei

National Stadium, Singapore

== Gold medal match ==
Thailand defeated Singapore to win the gold medal.

6 June 1983

Singapore	1–2	Thailand

National Stadium, Singapore
