= Dollah Kassim =

Singaporean footballer

Personal information
- Full name: Abdullah bin Kassim
- Date of birth: 13 March 1949
- Place of birth: Singapore
- Date of death: 14 October 2010 (aged 61)
- Position: Striker

Senior career*
Years	Team	Apps	(Gls)
- International Contract Specialists
- Singapore Lions

International career
1969–1979	Singapore	155	(56)
- * Club domestic league appearances and goals

Abdullah "Dollah" bin Kassim (13 March 1949 – 14 October 2010) was one of the most famous Singaporean footballers during the 1970s. In 1977, he helped Singapore bring the Malaysia Cup to the country. He was dubbed the "Gelek King", a nickname referring to his superior ball control and extraordinary dribbling skills which made him look as if he was dancing past opposing defenders.

== Early life ==
Dollah grew up in a kampong at Owen Road in Farrer Park,. He was the fourth child in the family, with five brothers and two sisters. He attended Rangoon Road Primary School from 1957 to 1962, and then Serangoon English Secondary School between 1963 and 1966.

While still a schoolboy, coach Choo Seng Quee spotted Dollah playing football in the kampong and brought him for training sessions at the famous Farrer Park fields. In 1966, Dollah formed a team named Burnley United with some friends, including future national team players, Samad Alapitchay and S. Rajagopal.

== Career ==
In 1968, Burnley United competed in and won the FAS’s youth tournament. Dollah impressed in the tournament and was called up for the national football team, which came with a training allowance of S$5 per session.

After serving the National Service, Dollah joined Singapore Pools as a clerk and played for the Toto Pools team in the FAS's National Football League (NFL) Division One. His national team career progressed as he was named in the Singapore squad for the 1969 and 1970 editions of the Merdeka Tournament in Kuala Lumpur.

Dollah went on to make an impact on the tournament by scoring four goals in 1971, including a penalty in a memorable 1–0 win over Burma. The following year, Dollah was part of the Singapore squad which spent a month training in London with English clubs Arsenal and Chelsea.

The National Stadium opened in 1973 and Singapore hosted the Southeast Asian Peninsular (SEAP) Games that year. Dollah was part of the team which reached the semi-finals of the SEAP Games in the newly minted stadium, as Singapore beat Thailand 1-0 and drew with Malaysia 0-0 before going out on penalties against South Vietnam.

Having been briefly dropped from the national team for skipping training in September 1974, Dollah was back in the national team in January 1975. That year he was the top goal scorer for Singapore in the Malaysia Cup, with one goal proving particularly memorable. It came in the semi-final against Pahang at the National Stadium, as Dollah tricked his way past four defenders and the goalkeeper before scoring. Singapore however lost the Malaysia Cup final 1–0 to Selangor. At the end of the year, Dollah was in the Singapore side which finished joint third with Burma at the SEAP Games in Thailand.

In 1976, Dollah appeared in the Malaysia Cup final but Singapore again lost to Selangor. The next year, however, he was part of the team which defeated Penang 3–2 in the final, marking the first time in 12 years Singapore had won the Malaysia Cup. Dollah played in two more Malaysia Cup finals for Singapore in 1978 and 1979, but was denied another winner's medal on both occasions by Selangor.

== Death ==
On 4 October 2009, Dollah collapsed during a friendly match between ex-international players from Singapore and Malaysia in the Sultan of Selangor Cup due to a seizure and a cardiac event. He was admitted to Tan Tock Seng Hospital in a critical condition.

On 21 January 2010, the S.League raised $82,000 for Dollah Kassim at a Charity Shield match between Singapore Armed Forces FC and Swedish champions AIK at the Choa Chu Kang Stadium. The proceeds from the match, donations from the 2,352 spectators, a pledge of $10,000 from S.League co-title sponsors Great Eastern Life and various contributions from other corporations and club chairmen were donated to Dollah's family to help them pay for his medical bills.

On 14 October 2010, Dollah Kassim died after being in a coma for a year.

== Honours ==
=== International ===
- Malaysia Cup: 1977
