= Trevor Hartley =

English footballer and manager

Personal information
- Full name: Trevor Hartley
- Date of birth: 16 March 1947 (age 79)
- Place of birth: Doncaster, West Riding of Yorkshire, England
- Position: Midfielder

Youth career
- 1966–1967: West Ham United

Senior career*
| Years | Team | Apps | (Gls) |
| 1967–1969 | West Ham United | 5 | (0) |
| 1969–1971 | Bournemouth & Boscombe Athletic | 42 | (2) |
| Total | | 47 | (2) |

Managerial career
- 1974–1975: AFC Bournemouth
- 1977: Singapore (Director of Coaching)
- 1987: Tottenham Hotspur (caretaker)
- 1988–1990: Malaysia
- * Club domestic league appearances and goals

Trevor Hartley (born 16 March 1947) is an English former footballer with West Ham United and Bournemouth & Boscombe Athletic and football manager with AFC Bournemouth and Tottenham Hotspur.

== Biography ==
=== Footballing career ===
Trevor Hartley was born in Doncaster, West Riding of Yorkshire. He joined West Ham United as a junior in 1966. He made his first-team debut in a 3–1 away defeat by West Bromwich Albion, on 28 April 1967. He made only five appearances for West Ham as a right winger between 1967 and 1969 before being transferred to Bournemouth & Boscombe Athletic where he made 42 appearances between 1969 and 1971 scoring two goals.

=== Managerial career ===
Between 1974 and 1975, he was manager at AFC Bournemouth. In 1986, he became David Pleat's Assistant Manager at Tottenham and when Pleat stood down in October 1987, he stood in as caretaker manager together with Doug Livermore who subsequently took charge, pending the arrival of Terry Venables in November that year. He later took charge of the national team of Malaysia between 1988 and 1990.
