= Samad Allapitchay =

Singaporean former footballer

Personal information
- Date of birth: 1950 (age 75–76)
- Place of birth: Singapore
- Position: Centre-back

Senior career*
Years	Team	Apps	(Gls)
- Geylang International
- Singapore FA
- Tampines Rovers

International career
1968–1981	Singapore	105	
- * Club domestic league appearances and goals

Samad Allapitchay (born 1950) is a Singaporean former footballer who played as a centre-back. Known as a hard-tackling, no-nonsense defender with a penchant for bulldozing his way from defence to attack, he was once dubbed "The Rock of Gibraltar" by his Singapore national team coach Mick Walker.

A former national team captain, Samad played for Singapore Football League sides Geylang International and Tampines Rovers, and the Singapore Lions in the Malaysia Cup.

== Personal life ==
Samad is married to Norizan Aljunied. His late youngest son was Singapore international defender Shariff Samat. Like his father, Shariff was a centre-back who played for Tampines Rovers and Geylang International.

== Honours ==
=== Club ===
Singapore Lions

- Malaysia Cup: 1977, 1980

Sporting positions
Preceded by Seak Poh Leong	Singapore national team captain 1977-1981	Succeeded by Au Yeong Pak Kuan
