= Burma national football team results (1970–1979) =

Team results

This article details the fixtures and results of the Burma national football team from 1970 till 1989. The country is now known as Myanmar, a name adopted in 1989.

== Results ==
Burma's score is shown first in each case.

Win Draw Lose

=== 1970 ===
Date	Opponent	Score	Competition	Myanmar scorers	Ref.
3 August 1970	India	2–0	1970 Merdeka Tournament	Ye Nyunt, Win Maung	
5 August 1970	South Vietnam	4–2	1970 Merdeka Tournament	Unknown	
7 August 1970	Taiwan	1–1	1970 Merdeka Tournament	Unknown	
9 August 1970	Malaysia	2–1	1970 Merdeka Tournament	Unknown	
12 August 1970	Hong Kong	5–0	1970 Merdeka Tournament	Unknown	
16 August 1970	South Korea	0–1	1970 Merdeka Tournament		
10 December 1970	Khmer Republic	2–1	1970 Asian Games	Win Maung, Myo Win Nyunt	
12 December 1970	Malaysia	1–0	1970 Asian Games	Win Maung	
14 December 1970	Japan	1–2	1970 Asian Games	Win Maung	
16 December 1970	Thailand	2–2	1970 Asian Games	Win Maung (2)	
17 December 1970	South Korea	1–0	1970 Asian Games	Than Soe	
18 December 1970	India	2–0	1970 Asian Games	Ye Nyunt (2)	
20 December 1970	South Korea	0–0	1970 Asian Games		

=== 1971 ===
Date	Opponent	Score	Competition	Myanmar scorers	Ref.
3 May 1971	Hong Kong	2–0	1971 President's Cup	Unknown	
6 May 1971	South Vietnam	2–0	1971 President's Cup	Unknown	
8 May 1971	Indonesia	3–1	1971 President's Cup	Maung Maung Tin, Than Soe, Win Maung	
11 May 1971	Malaysia	6–1	1971 President's Cup	Unknown	
13 May 1971	South Korea	0–0	1971 President's Cup		
15 May 1971	South Korea	0–0	1971 President's Cup		
7 June 1971	Indonesia	1–1	1971 Jakarta Anniversary Tournament	Khin Maing Tint	
9 June 1971	Singapore	6–0	1971 Jakarta Anniversary Tournament	Maung Kiaw Min (3), Ye Nyunt (3)	
11 June 1971	Malaysia	5–1	1971 Jakarta Anniversary Tournament	Ye Nyunt, Than Soe, Khin Maing Tint (2), Win Maung	
14 June 1971	Khmer Republic	8–0	1971 Jakarta Anniversary Tournament	Unknown	
16 June 1971	Indonesia	1–0	1971 Jakarta Anniversary Tournament	Win Maung	
6 August 1971	India	9–1	1971 Merdeka Tournament	Ye Nyunt (3), Win Maung (2), Aye Maung Gyi (2), Tin Aung Moe, Hia Tay	
10 August 1971	Philippines	2–0	1971 Merdeka Tournament	Than Soe (2)	
11 August 1971	Hong Kong	4–0	1971 Merdeka Tournament	Tin Aung Moe (2), Win Maung, Than Soe	
15 August 1971	Indonesia	2–2	1971 Merdeka Tournament	Win Nyunt, Hla Tay	
18 August 1971	Singapore	0–1	1971 Merdeka Tournament		
23 August 1971	Indonesia	1–0	1971 Merdeka Tournament	Hla Tay	
12 December 1971	South Vietnam	0–0	1971 SEAP Games		
15 December 1971	Singapore	8–1	1971 SEAP Games	Ye Nyunt (4), Maung Tin (2), Win Maung, Win Nyunt	
17 December 1971	Thailand	3–1	1971 SEAP Games	Tin Sein, Maung Kyan Myint, Ye Nyunt	
18 December 1971	Malaysia	2–1	1971 SEAP Games	Win Maung (2)	

=== 1972 ===
Date	Opponent	Score	Competition	Myanmar scorers	Ref.
21 March 1972	India	4–3	1972 Summer Olympics Qualifiers	Than Soe (2), Win Maung (2)	
24 March 1972	Ceylon	5–1	1972 Summer Olympics Qualifiers	Than Soe (2), Aye Maung Lay, Win Maung, Khin Maung Tint	
29 March 1972	Thailand	7–0	1972 Summer Olympics Qualifiers	Win Maung (2), Aye Maung Gyi, Tin Aung Moe, Aye Maung Lay, Ye Nyunt	
2 April 1972	Indonesia	3–0	1972 Summer Olympics Qualifiers	Win Maung (2), Ye Nyunt	
4 April 1972	Thailand	1–0	1972 Summer Olympics Qualifiers	Than Soe	
5 June 1972	Indonesia	0–1	1972 Jakarta Anniversary Tournament		
9 June 1972	Sri Lanka	4–2	1972 Jakarta Anniversary Tournament	Maung Soe Myint, Maung Myint Kyu, Maung Sein Win Lay, Maung Khin Maung Tint	
11 June 1972	Laos	6–1	1972 Jakarta Anniversary Tournament	Unknown	
15 June 1972	Malaysia	2–2	1972 Jakarta Anniversary Tournament	Maung Hla Tay, Maung Tint	
17 June 1972	South Korea	1–2	1972 Jakarta Anniversary Tournament	Unknown	
19 June 1972	Khmer Republic	0–3	1972 Jakarta Anniversary Tournament		
28 August 1972	Soviet Union	0–1	1972 Summer Olympics		
30 August 1972	Mexico	0–1	1972 Summer Olympics		
1 September 1972	Sudan	2–0	1972 Summer Olympics	Soe Than, Aung Moe Thin	
21 September 1972	Philippines	4–0	1972 President's Cup	Win Maung (2), Ye Nyunt, Tin Win	
23 September 1972	Indonesia	1–1	1972 President's Cup	Aye Maung	
25 September 1972	Singapore	1–0	1972 President's Cup	Khin Win	
27 September 1972	South Korea	1–0	1972 President's Cup	Ye Nyunt	
30 September 1972	Indonesia	3–1	1972 President's Cup	Win Maung (3)	

=== 1973 ===
Date	Opponent	Score	Competition	Myanmar scorers	Ref.
12 June 1973	Malaysia	2–2	1973 Jakarta Anniversary Tournament	Unknown	
28 July 1973	South Korea	0–0	1973 Merdeka Tournament		
30 July 1973	Singapore	1–0	1973 Merdeka Tournament	Than Soe	
2 August 1973	South Vietnam	2–1	1973 Merdeka Tournament		
5 August 1973	Kuwait	2–0	1973 Merdeka Tournament	Than Soe, Aye Kyaing	
8 August 1973	Bangladesh	6–0	1973 Merdeka Tournament	Maung Win Maung (2), Than Soe (2), Myo Win Nyunt, Ye Nyunt	
10 August 1973	Malaysia	1–2	1973 Merdeka Tournament	Ye Nyunt	
11 August 1973	South Korea	2–1	1973 Merdeka Tournament	Maung Tin Sein, Shan Pain	
2 September 1973	Laos	8–0	1973 SEAP Games	Than Soe (2), Win Maung (2), Maung Khin Lay (2), Maung Ye Nyunt, Mya Kyaing	
3 September 1973	South Vietnam	3–2	1973 SEAP Games	Win Maung, Mya Kyaing, Maung Ye Nyunt	
6 September 1973	Malaysia	1–0	1973 SEAP Games	Maung Ye Nyunt	
7 September 1973	South Vietnam	3–2	1973 SEAP Games	Mya Kyaing (3)	
22 September 1973	Thailand	2–2	1973 President's Cup Football Tournament	Win Lay Sein, Maung Maung Tin	
26 September 1973	Malaysia	1–3	1973 President's Cup Football Tournament	Win Maung	
28 September 1973	South Korea	1–0	1973 President's Cup Football Tournament	Tin Win	
30 September 1973	Khmer Republic	0–0	1973 President's Cup Football Tournament		
22 December 1973	South Korea	0–2	1973 King's Cup		

=== 1974 ===
Date	Opponent	Score	Competition	Myanmar scorers	Ref.
16 May 1974	Thailand	2–1	1974 President's Cup		
18 May 1974	South Korea	0–2	1974 President's Cup		
20 May 1974	Khmer Republic	6–0	1974 President's Cup	Unknown	
3 September 1974	Bahrain	4–0	1974 Asian Games	Ye Nyunt (2), Tin Win	
5 September 1974	Iran	1–2	1974 Asian Games	Mya Kyaing	
7 September 1974	Pakistan	5–1	1974 Asian Games	Than Soe (2), Mya Kyiang (2), Ye Nyunt	
10 September 1974	Israel	0–3	1974 Asian Games		
12 September 1974	Kuwait	2–5	1974 Asian Games		
14 September 1974	North Korea	2–2	1974 Asian Games	Maung Maung Tin, Tin Aung	

=== 1975 ===
Date	Opponent	Score	Competition	Myanmar scorers	Ref.
15 May 1975	Thailand	4–1	1975 President's Cup Football Tournament	Unknown	
22 May 1975	South Korea	0–1	1975 President's Cup Football Tournament		
12 June 1975	South Korea	0–2	1975 Jakarta Anniversary Tournament		
16 June 1975	Indonesia	2–0	1975 Jakarta Anniversary Tournament	Khin Maung Tint (2)	
18 June 1975	Malaysia	2–0	1975 Jakarta Anniversary Tournament	Unknown	
30 July 1975	Thailand	1–0	1975 Merdeka Tournament	Unknown	
1 August 1975	Bangladesh	7–1	1975 Merdeka Tournament	Than Soe (3), Khin Maung Tint (2), Mya Kyaing (2)	
3 August 1975	Malaysia	1–2	1975 Merdeka Tournament	Unknown	
5 August 1975	South Korea	2–3	1975 Merdeka Tournament	Than Soe, Khin Maung Tint	
9 August 1975	Hong Kong	5–0	1975 Merdeka Tournament	Unknown	
11 August 1975	Indonesia	2–0	1975 Merdeka Tournament	Than Soe, Tien Sein	
14 August 1975	Japan	0–2	1975 Merdeka Tournament		
10 December 1975	Singapore	1–0	1975 SEAP Games	Unknown	
13 December 1975	Malaysia	0–1	1975 SEAP Games		
15 December 1975	Singapore	2–2	1975 SEAP Games	Unknown	
21 December 1975	South Korea	1–3	1975 King's Cup	Unknown	
24 December 1975	Singapore	6–0	1975 King's Cup	Khin Maung Lay (2), Ye Nyunt (2), Tun Hla Aung	
27 December 1975	Malaysia	2–1	1975 King's Cup	Unknown	
30 December 1975	Indonesia	1–0	1975 King's Cup	Unknown	

=== 1976 ===
Date	Opponent	Score	Competition	Myanmar scorers	Ref.
1 January 1976	Thailand	0–0	1975 King's Cup		
4 January 1976	South Korea	0–1	1975 King's Cup		
12 June 1976	Indonesia	1–1	1976 Jakarta Anniversary Tournament	Unknown	
7 August 1976	Malaysia	1–3	1976 Merdeka Tournament	Unknown	
9 August 1976	Indonesia	5–1	1976 Merdeka Tournament	Unknown	
13 August 1976	India	2–2	1976 Merdeka Tournament	Maung Win, Maung Kyi Lon	
13 August 1976	Japan	2–2	1976 Merdeka Tournament	Unknown	
15 August 1976	South Korea	2–2	1976 Merdeka Tournament	Mya Kyiang, Tin Win	
17 August 1976	Thailand	1–0	1976 Merdeka Tournament	Unknown	
12 September 1976	New Zealand	0–2	1976 President Park's Cup		
16 September 1976	Thailand	2–0	1976 President Park's Cup	Kyi Lin, Mya Kyaing	

=== 1977 ===
Date	Opponent	Score	Competition	Myanmar scorers	Ref.
16 July 1977	Malaysia	0–1	1977 Merdeka Tournament		
19 July 1977	Indonesia	1–1	1977 Merdeka Tournament	Tin Win	
21 July 1977	Iraq	0–3	1977 Merdeka Tournament		
24 July 1977	South Korea	0–4	1977 Merdeka Tournament		
27 July 1977	Libya	3–1	1977 Merdeka Tournament	Tin Win (2), Sein Win Lay	
29 July 1977	Thailand	1–1	1977 Merdeka Tournament	Kyi Lwin	
21 November 1977	Singapore	5–1	1977 SEA Games	Than Win, Maung Nyint Aung, Aye Maung, Tin Win, Soe Naing	
22 November 1977	Thailand	3–0	1977 SEA Games	Aye Maung, Maung Maung Tin, Soe Naing	
25 November 1977	Malaysia	1–9	1977 SEA Games	Aye Maung	

=== 1978 ===
Date	Opponent	Score	Competition	Myanmar scorers	Ref.
11 December 1978	Thailand	1–2	1978 Asian Games	Unknown	
13 December 1978	North Korea	0–3	1978 Asian Games		

=== 1979 ===
Date	Opponent	Score	Competition	Myanmar scorers	Ref.
27 April 1979	South Korea	1–0	Friendly	Unknown	
28 June 1979	Thailand	2–0	1979 Merdeka Tournament	Unknown	
1 July 1979	Japan	0–1	1979 Merdeka Tournament		
4 July 1979	Malaysia	1–4	1979 Merdeka Tournament	Unknown	
9 July 1979	Singapore	4–1	1979 Merdeka Tournament	Maung Nu (2), Maung Than Win, Maung Thet Tin	
11 July 1979	Indonesia	4–0	1979 Merdeka Tournament	Maung Maung Nu (2), Maung Pauk Si	
22 September 1979	Thailand	0–1	1979 SEA Games		
25 September 1979	Malaysia	0–0	1979 SEA Games		
26 September 1979	Singapore	1–2	1979 SEA Games	Aye Maung	
28 September 1979	Indonesia	1–2	1979 SEA Games	Thai Win	

== Head-to-head records ==
Burma national football team head-to-head records (1970–1979)
Opponent	Pld	W	D	L	GF	GA	GD	Pts	Confederation
Bahamas	1	1	0	0	4	0	+4	3	AFC
Bangladesh	1	1	0	0	7	1	+6	3	AFC
Hong Kong	3	3	0	0	11	0	+11	9	AFC
India	5	4	1	0	17	5	+12	13	AFC
Indonesia	11	6	3	2	21	9	+12	21	AFC
Iran	1	0	0	1	1	2	–1	0	AFC
Iraq	1	0	0	1	0	3	–3	0	AFC
Israel	1	0	0	1	0	3	–3	0	AFC
Japan	3	0	1	2	3	5	–2	1	AFC
Khmer Republic	4	3	1	0	16	1	+15	10	AFC
Kuwait	2	1	0	1	4	5	–1	3	AFC
Laos	2	2	0	0	14	1	+13	6	AFC
Libya	1	1	0	0	3	1	+2	3	CAF
Malaysia	9	3	2	4	18	20	–2	11	AFC
Mexico	1	0	0	1	0	1	–1	0	CONCACAF
New Zealand	1	0	0	1	0	2	–2	0	OFC
North Korea	2	0	1	1	2	5	–3	1	AFC
Pakistan	1	1	0	0	5	1	+4	3	AFC
Philippines	2	2	0	0	6	0	+6	6	AFC
Singapore	5	3	1	1	20	4	+16	10	AFC
South Korea	10	3	3	4	5	11	–6	12	AFC
South Vietnam	5	4	1	0	12	5	+7	13	AFC
Ceylon/Sri Lanka	2	2	0	0	9	3	+6	6	AFC
Sudan	1	1	0	0	2	0	+2	3	CAF
Taiwan	1	0	1	0	1	1	0	1	AFC
Thailand	8	4	3	1	17	7	+10	15	AFC
Soviet Union	1	0	0	1	0	1	–1	0	UEFA
Total	85	44	18	23	198	97	+101	15	
