= Burma national football team results (1950–1969) =

This article details the fixtures and results of the Burma national football team from 1950 till 1969. The country is now known as Myanmar, a name adopted in 1989.

== Results ==
Burma's score is shown first in each case.

=== 1951 ===
Date	Opponent	Score	Competition	Myanmar scorers	Ref.
5 February 1951	Iran	0–2	1st Asian Games		

=== 1952 ===
Date	Opponent	Score	Competition	Myanmar scorers	Ref.
16 March 1952	India	0–4	1952 Asian Quadrangular Football Tournament		
23 March 1952	Pakistan	0–1	1952 Asian Quadrangular Football Tournament		

=== 1953 ===
Date	Opponent	Score	Competition	Myanmar scorers	Ref.
24 October 1953	Ceylon	3–2	1953 Asian Quadrangular Football Tournament	Gordon Samuel (3)	
28 October 1953	Pakistan	1–1	1953 Asian Quadrangular Football Tournament	Ba Kyu	
31 October 1953	India	2–4	1953 Asian Quadrangular Football Tournament	Gordon Samuel, Ba Kyu	

=== 1954 ===
Date	Opponent	Score	Competition	Myanmar scorers	Ref.
4 May 1954	Singapore	1–1	1954 Asian Games	Gordon Samuel	
5 May 1954	Pakistan	2–1	1954 Asian Games	Gordon Samuel, Sein Pe	
7 May 1954	South Korea	2–2	1954 Asian Games	Unknown	
7 May 1954	Indonesia	5–4	1954 Asian Games	Unknown	
19 December 1954	Pakistan	1–1	1954 Asian Quadrangular Football Tournament	Sein Pe	
23 December 1954	India	1–2	1954 Asian Quadrangular Football Tournament	Gordon Samuel	
25 December 1954	Ceylon	1–2	1954 Asian Quadrangular Football Tournament	Htoo Wa	

=== 1955 ===
Date	Opponent	Score	Competition	Myanmar scorers	Ref.
17 December 1955	Pakistan	2–4	1955 Asian Quadrangular Football Tournament	Suk Bahadur, Kyaw Zan	
20 December 1955	India	2–5	1955 Asian Quadrangular Football Tournament	Suk Bahadur, Aung Shein	
23 December 1955	Ceylon	1–3	1955 Asian Quadrangular Football Tournament	Suk Bahadur (2), Aung Myint	

=== 1957 ===
Date	Opponent	Score	Competition	Myanmar scorers	Ref.
27 June 1957	China	2–1	Friendly	Unknown	
1 September 1957	Malaya	2–5	1957 Merdeka Tournament	Yaui Do, Vernon Stiles	
3 September 1957	Cambodia	2–0	1957 Merdeka Tournament	Maung Maung, Pe-khin	
5 September 1957	Thailand	5–2	1957 Merdeka Tournament	Gordon Samuel, Vernon Stiles, Tun Kyi (2)	
7 September 1957	Singapore	2–3	1957 Merdeka Tournament	Suk Bahadur (2)	

=== 1958 ===
Date	Opponent	Score	Competition	Myanmar scorers	Ref.
25 May 1958	Indonesia	2–4	1958 Asian Games	Gordon Samuel, Tun Aung	
26 May 1958	India	2–3	1958 Asian Games	Unknown	

=== 1959 ===
Date	Opponent	Score	Competition	Myanmar scorers	Ref.
22 April 1959	Pakistan	1–0	Friendly	Muhammad Siddiq (own goal)	
24 April 1959	Pakistan	2–3	Friendly	Vernon Stiles, Ni Tut	
26 April 1959	Pakistan	4–2	Friendly	Maung Ko (3), Vernon Stiles	
28 April 1959	Pakistan	1–4	Friendly	Suk Bahadur	
13 December 1959	Malaya	1–2	1959 SEAP Games	Unknown	
14 December 1959	South Vietnam	0–3	1959 SEAP Games		
15 December 1959	Thailand	2–5	1959 SEAP Games	Unknown	

=== 1961 ===
Date	Opponent	Score	Competition	Myanmar scorers	Ref.
18 January 1961	Pakistan	3–1	Friendly	Suk Bahadur (2), Ko Ko Gyi	
20 January 1961	Pakistan	0–4	Friendly		
27 January 1961	Pakistan	1–1	Friendly	Ko Ko Gyi	
28 October 1961	South Korea	1–3	Friendly	Maung Ko	
11 December 1961	Cambodia	4–0	1961 SEAP Games	Unknown	
13 December 1961	Malaya	1–2	1961 SEAP Games	Unknown	
14 December 1961	South Vietnam	2–1	1961 SEAP Games	Unknown	
16 December 1961	Malaya	0–2	1961 SEAP Games	Unknown	

=== 1962 ===
Date	Opponent	Score	Competition	Myanmar scorers	Ref.
9 September 1962	Pakistan	0–1	1962 Merdeka Tournament		
12 September 1962	Malaya	2–3	1962 Merdeka Tournament	Ko Ko Gyi (2)	
16 September 1962	Japan	2–1	1962 Merdeka Tournament	Unknown	

=== 1963 ===
Date	Opponent	Score	Competition	Myanmar scorers	Ref.
14 January 1963	China	0–3	Friendly		
20 January 1963	China	2–1	Friendly	Unknown	
22 March 1963	North Korea	0–0	1964 Summer Olympics Qualifiers		
2 April 1963	North Korea	0–1	1964 Summer Olympics Qualifiers		
4 September 1963	China	0–4	Friendly		
October 1963	North Vietnam	1–1	Friendly		
17 December 1963	East Germany	1–5	Friendly	Unknown	

=== 1964 ===
Date	Opponent	Score	Competition	Myanmar scorers	Ref.
28 August 1964	Malaysia	3–0	1964 Merdeka Tournament	Suk Bahadur, Aung Khin, Khin Maung Latt	
30 August 1964	Taiwan	2–4	1964 Merdeka Tournament	Win Maung	
2 September 1964	South Vietnam	1–0	1964 Merdeka Tournament	Aung Khin	
6 September 1964	India	1–0	1964 Merdeka Tournament	Ba Pu	

=== 1965 ===
Date	Opponent	Score	Competition	Myanmar scorers	Ref.
22 March 1965	Japan	1–1	Friendly	Unknown	
15 August 1965	Hong Kong	4–2	1965 Merdeka Tournament	Unknown	
22 August 1965	Thailand	1–1	1965 Merdeka Tournament	Maung Pan Sit	
24 August 1965	Taiwan	3–1	1965 Merdeka Tournament	Sonny Tin Tun, Pan Sit, Kyaw Thaung	
27 August 1965	India	1–1	1965 Merdeka Tournament	Unknown	
15 December 1965	Singapore	1–0	1965 SEAP Games	Unknown	
18 December 1965	Malaysia	2–0	1965 SEAP Games	Maung Myint, Than Win	
22 December 1965	Thailand	2–2	1965 SEAP Games	Unknown	

=== 1966 ===
Date	Opponent	Score	Competition	Myanmar scorers	Ref.
5 April 1966	Ceylon	3–0	Friendly	Unknown	
8 April 1966	Ceylon	3–1	Friendly	Unknown	
13 August 1966	Singapore	2–2	1966 Merdeka Tournament	Han Thein, Aye Maung	
17 August 1966	Thailand	3–0	1966 Merdeka Tournament	Hla Kyi (2), Hla Htay	
21 August 1966	Malaysia	0–0	1966 Merdeka Tournament		
23 August 1966	South Korea	2–0	1966 Merdeka Tournament	Aung Khin (2)	
25 August 1966	Hong Kong	2–0	1966 Merdeka Tournament	Aung Khin (2)	
27 August 1966	South Vietnam	0–1	1966 Merdeka Tournament		
12 December 1966	South Korea	1–0	1966 Asian Games	Han Thien	
14 December 1966	Thailand	1–1	1966 Asian Games	Unknown	
15 December 1966	Indonesia	2–2	1966 Asian Games	Unknown	
17 December 1966	Iran	1–0	1966 Asian Games	Tin Aye	
18 December 1966	Singapore	2–0	1966 Asian Games	Hla Kyi, Ba Pu	
20 December 1966	Iran	1–0	1966 Asian Games	Hla Kyi	

=== 1967 ===
Date	Opponent	Score	Competition	Myanmar scorers	Ref.
13 August 1967	South Korea	0–1	1967 Merdeka Tournament		
15 August 1967	Singapore	3–0	1967 Merdeka Tournament	Unknown	
19 August 1967	Indonesia	5–0	1967 Merdeka Tournament	Unknown	
20 August 1967	Taiwan	1–2	1967 Merdeka Tournament	Unknown	
23 August 1967	South Vietnam	3–0	1967 Merdeka Tournament	Ba Pu, Win Maung (2)	
26 August 1967	South Korea	0–0	1967 Merdeka Tournament		
12 November 1967	India	2–0	1968 AFC Asian Cup qualification	Suk Bahadur, Aung Khin	
16 November 1967	Cambodia	1–0	1968 AFC Asian Cup qualification	Win Maung	
19 November 1967	Pakistan	2–0	1968 AFC Asian Cup qualification	Suk Bahadur, Hla Kyi	
11 December 1967	Malaysia	2–1	1967 SEAP Games	Unknown	
12 December 1967	Thailand	1–0	1967 SEAP Games	Unknown	
14 December 1967	Laos	2–0	1967 SEAP Games	Unknown	
16 December 1967	South Vietnam	2–1	1967 SEAP Games	Unknown	

=== 1968 ===
Date	Opponent	Score	Competition	Myanmar scorers	Ref.
11 May 1968	Taiwan	1–1	1968 AFC Asian Cup	Hla Htay	
14 May 1968	Israel	1–0	1968 AFC Asian Cup	Ye Nyunt	
16 May 1968	Iran	1–3	1968 AFC Asian Cup	Hla Tay	
18 May 1968	Hong Kong	2–0	1968 AFC Asian Cup	Aung Khin, Suk Bahadur	
10 August 1968	South Vietnam	3–0	1968 Merdeka Tournament	Hla Htay, Suk Bahadur, Ye Nyunt	
12 August 1968	Hong Kong	3–0	1968 Merdeka Tournament	Unknown	
13 August 1968	Thailand	0–0	1968 Merdeka Tournament		
17 August 1968	Malaysia	1–1	1968 Merdeka Tournament	Suk Bahadur	
18 August 1968	India	1–3	1968 Merdeka Tournament	Suk Bahadur	
21 August 1968	Indonesia	2–1	1968 Merdeka Tournament	Ye Nyunt (2)	
25 August 1968	Malaysia	0–3	1968 Merdeka Tournament		
20 November 1968	Laos	3–0	1968 King's Cup	Suk Bahadur, Tin Aye, Ye Nyunt	
22 November 1968	Singapore	2–0	1968 King's Cup	Aye Maung, Bu Pa	
24 November 1968	Indonesia	1–3	1968 King's Cup	Tin Aung Moe	
29 November 1968	Thailand	2–0	1968 King's Cup	Unknown	
2 December 1968	Indonesia	0–1	1968 King's Cup		

=== 1969 ===
Date	Opponent	Score	Competition	Myanmar scorers	Ref.
1 November 1969	India	6–0	1969 Merdeka Tournament	Ye Nyunt (3), Hia Tay (2), Maung Maung Tin	
5 November 1969	Singapore	3–1	1969 Merdeka Tournament	Unknown	
7 November 1969	Malaysia	1–3	1969 Merdeka Tournament	Unknown	
9 November 1969	Singapore	9–0	1969 Merdeka Tournament	Unknown	
8 December 1969	Thailand	1–1	1969 SEAP Games	Unknown	
11 December 1969	Laos	4–0	1969 SEAP Games	Unknown	
13 December 1969	Thailand	3–0	1969 SEAP Games	Unknown	
