= Laos national football team results (1961–1999) =

This article details the fixtures and results of the Laos national football team from 1961 up to until 1999.

== Key ==
Key to matches

- Att. = Match attendance
- (H) = Home ground
- (A) = Away ground
- (N) = Neutral ground

Key to record by opponent

- Pld = Games played
- W = Games won
- D = Games drawn
- L = Games lost
- GF = Goals for
- GA = Goals against

== Results ==
Laos's score is shown first in each case.

Laos national football team results
No.	Date	Venue	Opponents	Score	Competition	Laos scorers	Att.	Ref.
1	12 December 1961	Bogyoke Aung San Stadium, Rangoon (N)	South Vietnam	0–7	1961 SEAP Games			
2	13 December 1961	Bogyoke Aung San Stadium, Rangoon (N)	Thailand	2–5	1961 SEAP Games	Unknown		
3	13 November 1963	Indonesia (N)	North Vietnam	1–9	1963 GANEFO Tournament			
4	15 November 1963	Indonesia (N)	Egypt	0–15	1963 GANEFO Tournament			
5	11 December 1967	National Stadium, Bangkok (N)	South Vietnam	0–5	1967 SEAP Games			
6	14 December 1967	National Stadium, Bangkok (N)	Burma	0–2	1967 SEAP Games			
7	15 December 1967	National Stadium, Bangkok (A)	Thailand	2–5	1967 SEAP Games			
8	22 November 1968	Bangkok (A)	Thailand	0–1	1968 King's Cup			
9	24 November 1968	Bangkok (N)	Malaysia	0–5	1968 King's Cup			
10	19 November 1969	Bangkok (N)	South Korea	0–2	1969 King's Cup			
11	21 November 1969	Bangkok (A)	Thailand	4–3	1969 King's Cup	Unknown		
12	23 November 1969	Bangkok (N)	Malaysia	1–1	1969 King's Cup	La Mone		
13	26 November 1969	Bangkok (N)	Indonesia	1–3	1969 King's Cup	Unknown		
14	6 December 1969	Bogyoke Aung San Stadium, Rangoon (N)	Malaysia	1–2	1969 SEAP Games	Unknown		
15	9 December 1969	Bogyoke Aung San Stadium, Rangoon (N)	South Vietnam	0–0	1969 SEAP Games			
16	11 December 1969	Bogyoke Aung San Stadium, Rangoon (A)	Burma	0–4	1969 SEAP Games			
17	23 October 1970	Saigon (A)	South Vietnam	0–4	Friendly			
18	8 November 1970	Bangkok (A)	Thailand	0–1	1970 King's Cup			
19	10 November 1970	Bangkok (N)	South Korea	0–4	1970 King's Cup			
20	14 November 1970	Bangkok (N)	Singapore	3–0	1970 King's Cup	Unknown		
21	16 November 1970	Bangkok (N)	Hong Kong	2–4	1970 King's Cup	Unknown		
22	12 December 1971	Merdeka Stadium, Kuala Lumpur (A)	Malaysia	0–5	1971 SEAP Games	Unknown		
23	14 December 1971	Merdeka Stadium, Kuala Lumpur (N)	Khmer Republic	0–2	1971 SEAP Games			
24	16 December 1971	Merdeka Stadium, Kuala Lumpur (N)	Thailand	0–3	1971 SEAP Games			
25	7 June 1972	Jakarta (A)	Indonesia	1–5	1972 Jakarta Anniversary Tournament	Udjang (og)		
26	9 June 1972	Jakarta (N)	Malaysia	0–2	1972 Jakarta Anniversary Tournament			
27	11 June 1972	Jakarta (N)	Burma	1–6	1972 Jakarta Anniversary Tournament	Unknown		
28	13 June 1972	Jakarta (N)	Sri Lanka	1–3	1972 Jakarta Anniversary Tournament	Unknown		
29	2 September 1973	National Stadium, Singapore (N)	Burma	0–8	1973 SEAP Games	Unknown		
30	4 September 1973	National Stadium, Singapore (N)	South Vietnam	1–5	1973 SEAP Games	Unknown		
31	1 November 1974	Saigon (A)	South Vietnam	0–1	1974 Vietnam Independence Tournament			
32	2 November 1974	Saigon (N)	Malaysia	0–0	1974 Vietnam Independence Tournament			
33	5 November 1974	Saigon (N)	Taiwan	1–2	1974 Vietnam Independence Tournament	Unknown		
34	10 December 1974	Bangkok (N)	Singapore	0–2	1974 King's Cup			
35	12 December 1974	Bangkok (A)	Thailand	1–6	1974 King's Cup	Unknown		
36	14 December 1974	Bangkok (N)	Malaysia	2–2	1974 King's Cup	Unknown		
37	7 June 1993	National Stadium, Singapore (N)	Brunei	3–2	Football at the 1993 SEA Games	Khenkitisack (2), Saysana	6,000	
38	9 June 1993	Jurong Stadium, Singapore (N)	Myanmar	1–7	Football at the 1993 SEA Games	Khenkitisack	1,000	
39	11 June 1993	Jurong Stadium, Singapore (N)	Malaysia	0–9	Football at the 1993 SEA Games		1,500	
40	13 June 1993	National Stadium, Singapore (N)	Thailand	1–4	Football at the 1993 SEA Games	Saysana	10,000	
41	6 December 1995	Thailand (N)	Philippines	1–0	Football at the 1995 SEA Games	Maicompiuto		
42	8 December 1995	Thailand (N)	Brunei	3–0	Football at the 1995 SEA Games	Luang, Auxaynoma, Sinahoukiena		
43	10 December 1995	Thailand (N)	Singapore	0–0	Football at the 1995 SEA Games			
44	12 December 1995	Thailand (N)	Myanmar	0–1	Football at the 1995 SEA Games			
45	2 September 1996	Jurong Stadium, Jurong (N)	Indonesia	1–5	1996 AFF Championship	Saysana	2,800	
46	5 September 1996	Jurong Stadium, Jurong (N)	Vietnam	1–1	1996 AFF Championship	Chalana	1,400	
47	9 September 1996	Jurong Stadium, Jurong (N)	Cambodia	1–0	1996 AFF Championship	Keolakhone	4,000	
48	11 September 1996	Jurong Stadium, Jurong (N)	Myanmar	2–4	1996 AFF Championship	Khenkitisack, Phonesavanh	500	
49	5 October 1997	Senayan Stadium, Jakarta (A)	Indonesia	2–5	Football at the 1997 SEA Games	Somsack, Khenkitisack		
50	9 October 1997	Senayan Stadium, Jakarta (N)	Philippines	4–1	Football at the 1997 SEA Games	Thammavongsa, Channiphone, Fegidero (og), Unknown		
51	12 October 1997	Senayan Stadium, Jakarta (N)	Vietnam	1–2	Football at the 1997 SEA Games	Thepsouvanh		
52	14 October 1997	Senayan Stadium, Jakarta (N)	Malaysia	1–0	Football at the 1997 SEA Games	Channiphone		
53	16 March 1998	Thuwunna Stadium, Yangon (N)	Brunei	2–1	1998 AFF Championship qualification	Unknown		
54	18 March 1998	Thuwunna Stadium, Yangon (A)	Myanmar	0–3	1998 AFF Championship qualification			
55	26 August 1998	Hanoi Stadium, Hanoi (A)	Vietnam	1–4	1998 AFF Championship	Keolakhone	20,000	
56	28 August 1998	Hanoi Stadium, Hanoi (N)	Malaysia	0–0	1998 AFF Championship		15,000	
57	30 August 1998	Hanoi Stadium, Hanoi (N)	Singapore	1–4	1998 AFF Championship	Phonephachan	15,000	
58	3 December 1998	Sri Nakhon Lamduan Stadium, Sisaket (N)	Kazakhstan	0–5	Football at the 1998 Asian Games			
59	5 December 1998	Sri Nakhon Lamduan Stadium, Sisaket (N)	Iran	1–6	Football at the 1998 Asian Games	Keophet		
60	30 July 1999	Berakas Sports Complex, Bandar Seri Begawan (N)	Vietnam	0–9	Football at the 1999 SEA Games		1,000	
61	1 August 1999	Berakas Track and Field Complex, Bandar Seri Begawan (N)	Thailand	1–4	Football at the 1999 SEA Games	Khenkittisack	20,000	
62	3 August 1999	Berakas Sports Complex, Bandar Seri Begawan (N)	Philippines	3–2	Football at the 1999 SEA Games	Thamavongsa, Soubinh, Louang-Amath	500	
63	5 August 1999	Berakas Track and Field Complex, Bandar Seri Begawan (N)	Myanmar	0–0	Football at the 1999 SEA Games		500	
