= Football at the 1975 SEAP Games =

Football at the 1975 Southeast Asian Peninsular Games
- Venue: 1 (in 1 host city)
- Dates: 9 December - 16 December 1975
- Nations: 4

Football was contested as part of the programme for the 1975 Southeast Asian Peninsular Games which was hosted in Bangkok, Thailand from 9 to 16 December 1975. It was the eighth edition of the men's football tournament at the multi-sport event organised by the SEAP Games Federation Committee.

The football tournament began with the first matches of the group stage on 9 December 1975 and ended with the gold medal match on 16 December 1975. Five-time defending champions Burma lost their crown after losing to Malaysia in the semi-finals. Hosts Thailand and Malaysia contested the final. Thailand defeated Malaysia 1–0 to win the gold medal. In the bronze medal match, Burma and Singapore drew 2–2 so the bronze medal was shared.

== Background ==
Football had been part of the Southeast Asian Peninsular Games programme following the debut of the men's competition at the inaugural 1959 SEAP Games in Thailand. Burma were five-time defending champions after defeating South Vietnam 3–2 in the gold medal match. Burma were also the most successful team having won the gold medal five times previously.

== Format ==
In total, four teams took part in the competition. They were drawn into two single round robin groups of two teams. The winners and runners-up would then contest the semi-finals which would decide the teams contesting the gold and bronze medal matches.

=== Participants ===
- Burma
- Malaysia
- Thailand
- Singapore

== Venue ==
Matches were played at the National Stadium in Bangkok, Thailand.

Bangkok is located in Thailand	Bangkok
Bangkok is located in Thailand	National Stadium
Bangkok is located in Thailand	Capacity: 20,000

== Group stage ==
=== Group A ===
Thailand and Malaysia advanced to the semi-finals.

==== Table ====
Pos	Team	Pld	W	D	L	GF	GA	GD	Pts	Qualification
1	Thailand	1	0	1	0	1	1	0	1	Advance to Knockout stage
2	Malaysia	1	0	1	0	1	1	0	1	Advance to Knockout stage

==== Match ====
9 December 1975

Thailand	1–1 (a.e.t.)	Malaysia
Sawasdi 38'		Dahari
Penalties
Sawasdi (penalty missed); Tooprasert (penalty scored); Naphatalung (penalty scored); Laohakul (penalty scored); Chivabutr (penalty scored)	4–3	(penalty scored) Dahari; (penalty missed) Singh; (penalty missed) Daud; (penalty scored) Bakar; (penalty scored) Norbit

National Stadium, Bangkok

=== Group B ===
Burma and Singapore advanced to the semi-finals.

==== Table ====
Pos	Team	Pld	W	D	L	GF	GA	GD	Pts	Qualification
1	Burma	1	1	0	0	1	0	+1	2	Advance to Knockout stage
2	Singapore	1	0	0	1	0	1	−1	0	Advance to Knockout stage

==== Match ====
10 December 1975

Burma	1–0	Singapore
Gulam 78' (o.g.)

National Stadium, Bangkok
Attendance: 1,500
Referee: Udom Anantapong (Thailand)

== Semi-finals ==
Thailand and Malaysia advanced to the gold medal match.

12 December 1975

Thailand	2–2 (a.e.t.)	Singapore
Sawasdi 18'; Khemngern 45'		Quah Kim Song 35'; Abidin 72'
Penalties
Pangdee (penalty scored); Naphatalung (penalty scored); Sawasdi (penalty missed); Kasiwat (penalty scored); Laohakul (penalty missed)	3–2	(penalty scored) Lim Teng Sai; (penalty missed) Allapitchay; (penalty missed) Kassim; (penalty scored) Noh; (penalty missed) Kumar

National Stadium, Bangkok
Attendance: 15,000
Referee: Sivapalan Kathiravale (Malaysia)

13 December 1975

Burma	0–1	Malaysia

National Stadium, Bangkok

== Bronze medal match ==
After a 2–2 draw after extra time, the bronze medal was shared between Burma and Singapore.

15 December 1975
19:00 (UTC+7)

Burma	2–2 (a.e.t.)	Singapore
Khin Maung Lay 37', 68'		Batchelor 53'; Kassim 72'

National Stadium, Bangkok
Referee: Thomson Chan (Hong Kong)

== Gold medal match ==
Thailand defeated Malaysia to win the gold medal.

16 December 1975

Thailand	2–1	Malaysia
Arumugam 31' (o.g.); Naphatalung 43'		Dahari 44'

National Stadium, Bangkok
Attendance: 30,000
Referee: R. Hatta (Indonesia)

== Goalscorers ==
There were 15 goals scored in 6 matches, for an average of 2.5 goals per match.

2 goals

- (Myanmar) Khin Maung Lay
- (Malaysia) Mokhtar Dahari
- (Thailand) Weerayudth Sawasdi

1 goal

- (Singapore) Brian Batchelor
- (Singapore) Dollah Kassim
- (Singapore) Quah Kim Song
- (Singapore) Zainal Abidin
- (Thailand) Jesdaporn Naphatalung
- (Thailand) Surin Khemngern

1 own goal

- (Malaysia) Arumugam Rengasamy
- (Singapore) Mohamed Gulam
