= 1975 Merdeka Tournament =

Tournament details
- Host country: Federation of Malaya
- Dates: 29 July – 17 August 1975
- Teams: 8
- Venue: 1 (in 1 host city)

Final positions
- Champions: South Korea (1st title)
- Runners-up: Malaysia
- Third place: Burma
- Fourth place: Japan

Tournament statistics
- Matches played: 28
- Goals scored: 105 (3.75 per match)
- Top scorer(s): Yu Kwok Kit (8 goals)

The 1975 Merdeka Tournament was the nineteenth edition of the annual football tournament hosted by Malaysia. It took place from 29 July to 17 August 1975 with eight participating nations.

== Venues ==
Kuala Lumpur
Merdeka Stadium
Capacity: 20,000
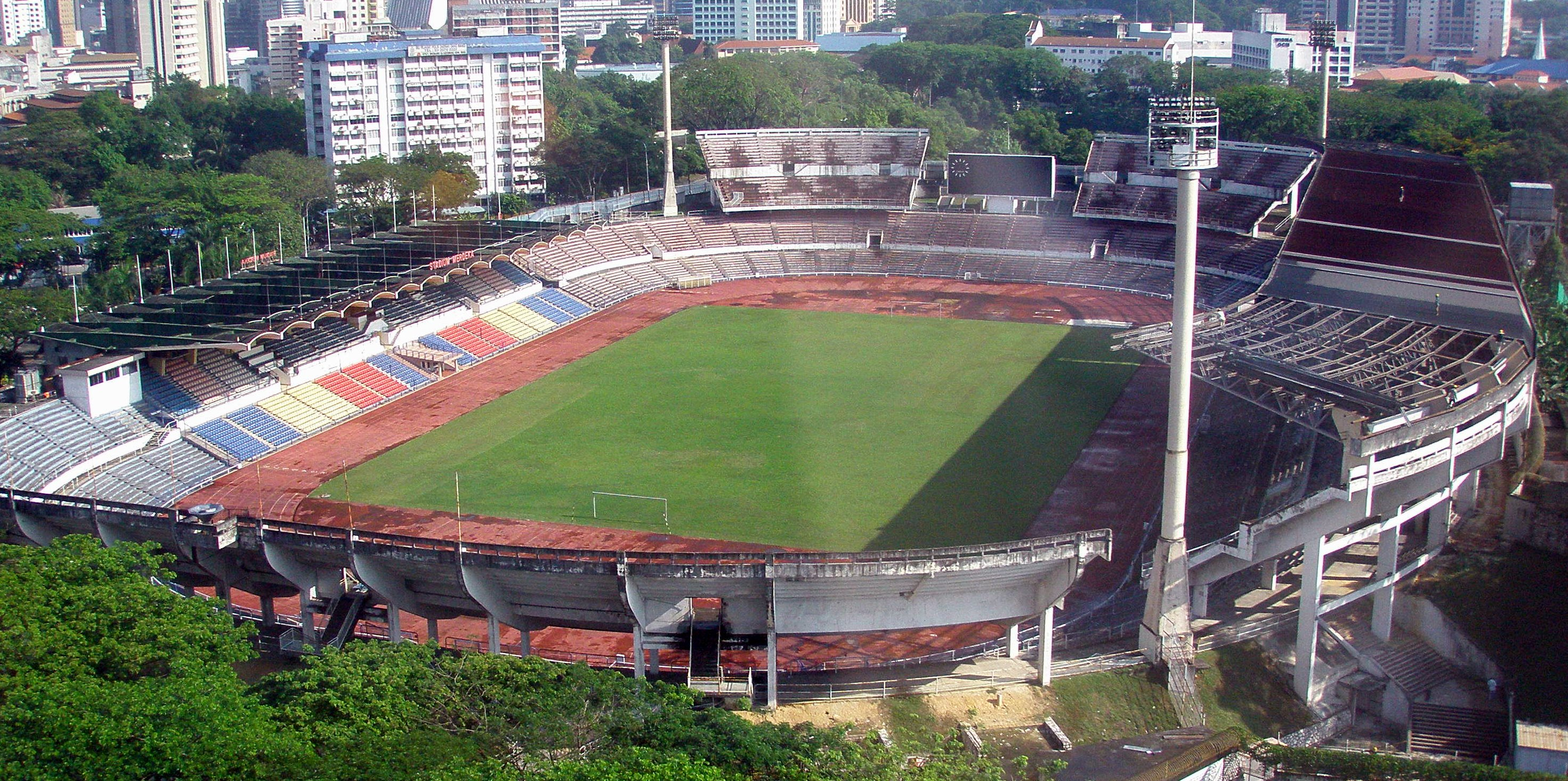

== Group stage ==
Team	Pld	W	D	L	GF	GA	GD	Pts
South Korea	7	7	0	0	25	5	20	14
Malaysia	7	6	0	1	14	6	8	12
Burma	7	4	0	3	18	8	10	8
Japan	7	4	0	3	14	8	6	8
Hong Kong	7	3	0	4	17	13	4	6
Indonesia	7	3	0	4	12	16	−4	6
Thailand	7	0	1	6	2	18	−16	1
Bangladesh	7	0	1	6	3	31	−28	1

29 July 1975

Malaysia	1–3	South Korea
Mokhtar 90'		Kim Jin-kook 2'; Cha Bum-kun 38'; Park Sung-hwa 84'

Merdeka Stadium, Kuala Lumpur
29 July 1975

Indonesia	4–0	Bangladesh
Junaedi 2', 24'; Waskito 7', 80'

Merdeka Stadium, Kuala Lumpur

30 July 1975

Japan	0–2	Hong Kong
	Report	Yu Kwok Kit; Unknown (o.g.)

Merdeka Stadium, Kuala Lumpur
Attendance: 8,000
30 July 1975

Burma	1–0	Thailand
Thein Aung	Report

Merdeka Stadium, Kuala Lumpur

1 August 1975

Burma	2–0	Indonesia
Thein Aung 1'; Than Soe 35'	Report

Merdeka Stadium, Kuala Lumpur
Attendance: 30,000
1 August 1975

South Korea	1–0	Hong Kong
Kim Jin-kook 68'	Report

Merdeka Stadium, Kuala Lumpur
Attendance: 30,000
Referee: G.Abeysekra (Malaysia)

2 August 1975

Thailand	1–1	Bangladesh
Sithipok 5' (pen.)	Report	Salahuddin 56'

Merdeka Stadium, Kuala Lumpur
Referee: Chen Tam Shing (Hong Kong)
2 August 1975

Malaysia	2–0	Japan
Isa 6'; Wong Choon Wah 16'	Report

Merdeka Stadium, Kuala Lumpur
Attendance: 15,000
Referee: U Tin Htut (Burma)

3 August 1975

Hong Kong	2–3	Indonesia
Fung Chi Ming 18', 37'	Report	Risdianto 71', 85'; Waskito 82'

Merdeka Stadium, Kuala Lumpur
3 August 1975

South Korea	3–2	Burma
Cho Dong-hyun 8'; Kim Jae-han 10'; Kim Ho-kon 49' (pen.)	Report	Than Soe 23'; Khin Maung Tint 45'

Merdeka Stadium, Kuala Lumpur
Referee: S.Kathiravale (Malaysia)

4 August 1975

Japan	3–0	Bangladesh
Kamamoto 12', 88'; Fujishima 58'	Report

Merdeka Stadium, Kuala Lumpur
Attendance: 4,000
4 August 1975

Malaysia	1–0	Thailand
Mokhtar 85'	Report

Merdeka Stadium, Kuala Lumpur
Referee: Toshio Asami (Japan)

6 August 1975

Malaysia	3–0	Bangladesh
Ali 5'; Isa 55'; Mokhtar 59'	Report

Merdeka Stadium, Kuala Lumpur
Attendance: 4,000
Referee: Chen Tam Shing (Hong Kong)
6 August 1975

Burma	5–0	Hong Kong
Aye Maung Lay 36'; Khin Maung Tint 61', ?'; Thein Aung 86'; Mya Kyaing ?'	Report

Merdeka Stadium, Kuala Lumpur

7 August 1975

Japan	3–1	Indonesia
Kamamoto 30', 38'; Fujishima 32'	Report	Waskito 19'

Merdeka Stadium, Kuala Lumpur
7 August 1975

South Korea	6–0	Thailand
Kim Jin-kook 14', 20', 43'; Cha Bum-kun 41'; Park Byung-chul 74'; Lee Young-moo 83'	Report

Merdeka Stadium, Kuala Lumpur
Referee: Koh Guan Kiat (Malaysia)

8 August 1975

Burma	7–1	Bangladesh
Than Soe 29', 33', 35'; Khin Maung Tint 38', 73'; Mya Kyaing 53', 61'	Report	Salahuddin 67'

Merdeka Stadium, Kuala Lumpur
8 August 1975

Malaysia	3–1	Hong Kong
Isa ?'; Mokhtar 56'; Wong Choon Wah 61'	Report	Lau Wing Yip 89'

Merdeka Stadium, Kuala Lumpur
Referee: Toshio Asami (Japan)

9 August 1975

Thailand	2–1	Indonesia
Preecha 88'	Report	Risdianto 55'; Amnart ?' (o.g.)

Merdeka Stadium, Kuala Lumpur
Attendance: 1,000
9 August 1975

South Korea	3–1	Japan
Cha Bum-kun 4', 42', 47'	Report	Ochiai 17'

Merdeka Stadium, Kuala Lumpur

10 August 1975

Hong Kong	9–1	Bangladesh
Kwok Ka Ming 6'; Yu Kwok Kit ?', 32', ?', ?'; Lai Yik Shu 40'; Sze Kin Hay 42', ?'; Fung Chi Ming ?'	Report	Salahuddin 85'

Merdeka Stadium, Kuala Lumpur
10 August 1975

Malaysia	2–1	Burma
Shah Norbit 36'; Mokhtar ?'	Report	Tin Sein 53'

Merdeka Stadium, Kuala Lumpur
Attendance: 40,000
Referee: Toshio Asami (Japan)

11 August 1975

South Korea	5–1	Indonesia
Cha Bum-kun 22'; Cho Dong-hyun 39', 59'; Yoo Dong-chun 82'; Park Sung-hwa 84'	Report	Junaedi 89' (pen.)

Merdeka Stadium, Kuala Lumpur
Referee: Zainal Abidin (Malaysia)
11 August 1975

Japan	4–0	Thailand
Fujishima 9'; Yoshimura 25'; Watanabe 67'; Ochiai 85'	Report

Merdeka Stadium, Kuala Lumpur

14 August 1975

Burma	0–2	Japan
	Report	Watanabe 31'; Kamamoto 35'

Merdeka Stadium, Kuala Lumpur
14 August 1975

Malaysia	2–1	Indonesia
Soh Chin Ann 43'; Salleh 85'	Report	Nobon 87'

Merdeka Stadium, Kuala Lumpur
Referee: Chen Tam Shing (Hong Kong)

15 August 1975

South Korea	4–0	Bangladesh
Kim Jin-kook 41'; Park Sung-hwa 57', 60'; Cha Bum-kun 87'	Report

Merdeka Stadium, Kuala Lumpur
15 August 1975

Thailand	0–3	Hong Kong
	Report	Yu Kwok Kit 5', 11', 65'

Merdeka Stadium, Kuala Lumpur

== Final ==
17 August 1975

South Korea	1–0	Malaysia
Lee Young-moo 31'	Report

Merdeka Stadium, Kuala Lumpur
Attendance: 40,000
Referee: Toshio Asami (Japan)
