= Football at the 1971 SEAP Games =

Football at the 1971 Southeast Asian Peninsular Games
- Venue: 3 (in 1 host city)
- Dates: 12 December - 18 December 1971
- Nations: 7

Football was contested as part of the programme for the 1971 Southeast Asian Peninsular Games which was hosted in Kuala Lumpur, Malaysia from 11 to 18 December 1971. It was the sixth edition of the men's football tournament at the multi-sport event organised by the SEAP Games Federation Committee.

The football tournament began with the first matches of the group stage on 12 December 1971 and ended with the gold medal match on 18 December 1971. Hosts Malaysia and three-time defending champions Burma contested the final. Burma defeated Malaysia 2–1 to win the gold medal. In the bronze medal match, Thailand and South Vietnam drew 0–0 so the bronze medal was shared.

== Background ==
Football had been part of the Southeast Asian Peninsular Games programme following the debut of the men's competition at the inaugural 1959 SEAP Games in Thailand. Burma were three-time defending champions after defeating Thailand 3–0 in the gold medal match. Burma were also the most successful team having won the gold medal three times previously.

== Format ==
In total, seven teams took part in the competition. They were drawn into two single round robin groups – one of three teams and one of four teams. The winners and runners-up would then contest the semi-finals which would decide the teams contesting the gold and bronze medal matches.

=== Participants ===
- Burma
- Khmer Republic
- Laos
- Malaysia
- Singapore
- South Vietnam
- Thailand

== Venue ==
Matches were played at the Stadium Merdeka in Kuala Lumpur, Malaysia.

Kuala Lumpur is located in Malaysia	Kuala Lumpur
Kuala Lumpur is located in Malaysia	Stadium Merdeka
Kuala Lumpur is located in Malaysia	Capacity: 25,000

== Group stage ==
=== Group A ===
Malaysia and Thailand advanced to the semi-finals.

==== Table ====
Pos	Team	Pld	W	D	L	GF	GA	GD	Pts	Qualification
1	Malaysia	3	3	0	0	12	2	+10	6	Advance to Knockout stage
2	Thailand	3	1	1	1	6	5	+1	3	Advance to Knockout stage
3	Khmer Republic	3	1	1	1	3	4	−1	3	
4	Laos	3	0	0	3	0	10	−10	0	

==== Matches ====
12 December 1971

Khmer Republic	1–1	Thailand
Sok Sun Hean 67'		Thongpleow 17'

Merdeka Stadium, Kuala Lumpur
12 December 1971

Malaysia	5–0	Laos
Wong Choon Wah (x2); Hussain 25'; Ahmad; S. Abdullah 75'

Merdeka Stadium, Kuala Lumpur
Referee: U Kyaw Nyein (Burma)

14 December 1971

Laos	0–2	Khmer Republic
		Sea Cheng Eang 39'; Salim 83' (pen.)

Merdeka Stadium, Kuala Lumpur
14 December 1971

Malaysia	4–2	Thailand
Ruangrung 18' (o.g.); S. Abdullah (x2); N. Abdullah		Sudsa-art 7', 42'

Merdeka Stadium, Kuala Lumpur

15 December 1971

Thailand	3–0	Laos
Sudsa-art 75', 76'; Meelarpkit 83'

TPCA Ground, Kuala Lumpur
15 December 1971

Malaysia	3–0	Khmer Republic
Ibrahim 5'; Wong Choon Wah 42', 57'

Mindef Stadium, Kuala Lumpur
Referee: Ng Eng Khim (Singapore)

=== Group B ===
Burma and South Vietnam advanced to the semi-finals.

==== Table ====
Pos	Team	Pld	W	D	L	GF	GA	GD	Pts	Qualification
1	Burma	2	1	1	0	8	1	+7	3	Advance to Knockout stage
2	South Vietnam	2	1	1	0	3	1	+2	3	Advance to Knockout stage
3	Singapore	2	0	0	2	2	11	−9	0	

==== Matches ====
12 December 1971

Burma	0–0	South Vietnam

Merdeka Stadium, Kuala Lumpur

14 December 1971

South Vietnam	3–1	Singapore
Trần Văn Xinh 33', 43', 61'		Quah Kim Song 31'

Merdeka Stadium, Kuala Lumpur

15 December 1971

Burma	8–1	Singapore
Ye Nyunt 16', 23', 42', 84'; Win Maung 38'; Myo Win Nyunt 44'; Maung Maung Tin 46', 61'		Unknown 58' (o.g.)

Merdeka Stadium, Kuala Lumpur

== Semi-finals ==
Malaysia and Burma advanced to the gold medal match.

17 December 1971

Malaysia	3–2	South Vietnam
S. Abdullah 46' (pen.), 66', 76'		Dương Văn Tha 5'; Trần Tiết Anh 27'

Merdeka Stadium, Kuala Lumpur

17 December 1971
21:00 (UTC+8)

Burma	3–1	Thailand
Tin Sein 83'; Maung Kyan Myint; Ye Nyunt 90'		Sudsa-art

Merdeka Stadium, Kuala Lumpur

== Bronze medal match ==
The bronze medal match was controversial after neither team appeared to want to win the match. No goals were scored in regulation time or extra time and the bronze medal was shared between Thailand and Vietnam.

18 December 1971

Thailand	0–0 (a.e.t.)	South Vietnam

TPCA Ground, Kuala Lumpur
Referee: K. Mahendran (Malaysia)

== Gold medal match ==
Burma defeated Malaysia to win the gold medal.

18 December 1971

Burma	2–1	Malaysia
Win Maung 1', 71'		S. Abdullah 15'

Merdeka Stadium, Kuala Lumpur
Referee: Huỳnh Bá Minh (South Vietnam)

== Goalscorers ==
There were 46 goals scored in 13 matches, for an average of 3.54 goals per match.

7 goals

- (Malaysia) Shaharuddin Abdullah

5 goals

- (Myanmar) Ye Nyunt
- (Thailand) Sudtha Sudsa-art

4 goals

- (Malaysia) Wong Choon Wah

3 goals

- (Myanmar) Win Maung
- (South Vietnam) Trần Văn Xinh

2 goals

- (Myanmar) Maung Maung Tin

1 goal

- (Myanmar) Maung Kyan Myint
- (Myanmar) Myo Win Nyunt
- (Myanmar) Tin Sein
- (Khmer Republic) Sok Sun Hean
- (Khmer Republic) Sea Cheng Eang
- (Khmer Republic) Slayman Salim
- (Malaysia) Hamzah Hussain
- (Malaysia) Namat Abdullah
- (Malaysia) Salleh Ibrahim
- (Malaysia) Syed Ahmad Syed Abu Bakar
- (Singapore) Quah Kim Song
- (South Vietnam) Dương Văn Tha
- (South Vietnam) Trần Tiết Anh
- (Thailand) Somnuk Thongpleow
- (Thailand) Supakit Meelarpkit

1 own goal

- (Thailand) Chumpol Ruangrung
