= Football at the 1972 Summer Olympics – Men's Asian Qualifiers =

International sports competition

1972 Summer Olympics – Men's Football Asian Qualifiers
- Dates: 28 May 1971 – 3 June 1972

The Men's Asian Qualifiers for the Football at the 1972 Summer Olympics began on 28 May 1971 and finished on 3 June 1972. The qualification determined the three teams that would play at the 1972 Summer Olympics. Malaysia, Burma, and Iran qualified for the tournament.

== Qualifying tournaments ==
=== Group 1 ===
Team	Pld	W	D	L	GF	GA	GD	Pts
Malaysia	4	4	0	0	12	0	+12	8
South Korea	4	3	0	1	16	2	+14	6
Japan	4	2	0	2	14	7	+7	4
Philippines	4	1	0	3	4	19	−15	2
Taiwan	4	0	0	4	1	19	−28	0

23 September 1971

Malaysia	3–0	Japan
Syed Ahmad 46', 84'; Looi Loon Teik 81'	Report

25 September 1971

Malaysia	1–0	South Korea
Syed Ahmad 51'	Report

25 September 1971

Philippines	3–0	Taiwan
Crame 9'; Martínez 11'; Delgado 65'	Report

27 September 1971

Malaysia	3–0	Taiwan
Liu Chen-Kuo 23' (o.g.); Salleh Ibrahim 42'; Looi Loon Teik 45'	Report

27 September 1971

Japan	8–1	Philippines
Ogi 9' (pen.), 40'; Kamamoto 11', 52', 73'; Tomizawa 41'; Miyamoto 44'; Yoshimura 61'	Report	Martínez 62'

29 September 1971

Japan	5–1	Taiwan
Kamamoto 13', 71', 81'; Yoshimura 47'; Miyamoto 59'	Report	Lee Fu-Tsai 88'

29 September 1971

South Korea	6–0	Philippines
Park Su-deok 49', 55', 85'; Jeong Gyu-poong 60'; Choi Jae-mo 65' (pen.); Lee Cha-man 70'	Report

2 October 1971

Malaysia	5–0	Philippines
Wong Choon Wah 20'; Looi Loon Teik 67', 67'; Syed Ahmad 44'; Mohammed Bakar 80'	Report

2 October 1971

South Korea	2–1	Japan
Park Su-deok 47'; Jeong Gyu-poong 83'	Report	Nagai 51'

4 October 1971

South Korea	8–0	Taiwan
Jeong Gyu-poong 7', 89'; Park Su-deok 11', 58'; Jeong Kang-ji 26'; Park Lee-chun 33'; Lee Cha-man 68'; Kim Gi-hyo 84'	Report

=== Group 2 ===
- All matches were held in Rangoon, Burma.

First Round

Group A location Matches

20 March 1972

Indonesia	4 – 0	Thailand
Jacob Sihasale 13', 69'; Iswadi Idris 49'; Abdul Kadir 82'	Report

Bogyoke Aung San Stadium, Rangoon.
21 March 1972

Burma	4 – 3	India
Than Soe 11', 14'; Win Maung 24', 41'	Report	Magan Singh 26'; Ghosh Dastidar 44', 50'

Bogyoke Aung San Stadium, Rangoon.
22 March 1972

Israel	3 – 0	Ceylon
Roni Calderon 12'; Dror Bar-Nur 52'; George Borba 70'	Report

Bogyoke Aung San Stadium, Rangoon.

Group (A)

Team	Pld	W	D	L	GF	GA	GD	Pts
Israel	2	2	0	0	2	0	+2	4
Indonesia	2	1	0	1	4	3	+1	2
India	2	0	0	2	2	5	−3	0

25 03 1972

Indonesia	4 – 2	India
Jacob Sihasale 10'; Waskito 16', 38'; Abdul Kadir 75'	Report	S.Chowdhury 57'; D.Nataraj 89'

Bogyoke Aung San Stadium, Rangoon.
28 03 1972

Israel	1 – 0	India
Mordechai Spiegler 50'	Report

Bogyoke Aung San Stadium, Rangoon.
30 03 1972

Israel	1 – 0	Indonesia
Victor Sarusi 47'	Report

Bogyoke Aung San Stadium, Rangoon.

Group (B)

Team	Pld	W	D	L	GF	GA	GD	Pts
Burma	2	2	0	0	12	1	+11	4
Thailand	2	1	0	1	5	7	−2	2
Ceylon	2	0	0	2	1	10	−9	0

24 03 1972

Burma	5 – 1	Ceylon
Than Soe 20', 80'; Aye Maung Lay 38'; Win Maung 55'; Khin Maung Tint 73'	Report	Dil Fawzeer 60'

Bogyoke Aung San Stadium, Rangoon.
26 03 1972

Thailand	5 – 0	Ceylon
Sudtha Sudsa-ard 17', 27', 29'; Kasetchai Suvantada 39'; Preecha Kitboon 44'	Report

Bogyoke Aung San Stadium, Rangoon.
29 03 1972

Burma	7 – 0	Thailand
Aye Maung Gyi 9'; Pitak Silprasit 18' (o.g.); Tin Aung Moe 35'; Win Maung 66', 88'; Aye Maung Lay 79'; Ye Nyunt 83'	Report

Bogyoke Aung San Stadium, Rangoon.

Semi-finals - 1

01 04 1972

Israel	0 – 0	Thailand
	Report
Penalties
	2 – 4

Bogyoke Aung San Stadium, Rangoon.

Semi-finals - 2

02 04 1972

Burma	3 – 0	Indonesia
Win Maung 16', 52'; Ye Nyunt 59'	Report

Bogyoke Aung San Stadium, Rangoon.

Finals

04 04 1972

Burma	1 – 0	Thailand
Than Soe 59'	Report

Bogyoke Aung San Stadium, Rangoon.

=== Group 3 ===
This group was initially scheduled to be played at Tehran but, due to problems obtaining visas from the Iranian authorities, FIFA rescheduled the group as a series of knockout ties.

First round

28 May 1971

North Korea	0–0	Syria

Pyongyang, North Korea
1 June 1971

North Korea	1–0	Syria
Kim 30'

Pyongyang, North Korea
20 June 1971

Lebanon	1–0	Iraq
Torikian 58'

Bourj Hammoud Stadium, Beirut
Referee: Nejat Şener (Turkey)
14 July 1971

Iraq	1–0	Lebanon
Jassam 55'

Al-Shaab Stadium, Baghdad
19 September 1971

Iraq	2–1	Lebanon
D.Aziz 27' (pen.); T.Aziz 87'		Hamzé 89'

Mithat Paşa Stadium, Istanbul

Second round

12 November 1971

Iraq	1–0	North Korea
Hatim 12'

Al-Shaab Stadium, Baghdad
28 November 1971

North Korea	3–0	Iraq
20'; 43'; 58'

Pyongyang, North Korea
3 December 1971

Iran	2–0	Kuwait
Parvin 27'; Jabbari 47'

Amjadieh Stadium, Tehran, Iran
Referee: Zahurul Alam (Bangladesh)
15 January 1972

Kuwait	0–2	Iran
		Mazloomi 49'; Parvin 76'

Panathinaikos Stadium, Athens, Greece

Third round

3 May 1972

North Korea	0–0	Iran

Pyongyang, North Korea
26 May 1972

Iran	0–0	North Korea

Amjadieh Stadium, Tehran, Iran
3 June 1972

Iran	2–0	North Korea
Iranpak 27'; Kalani 47'	Report

Army Stadium, Rawalpindi, Pakistan
Referee: Bahadur Khan (Pakistan)

== Qualified teams for Summer Olympics ==
The following teams from Asia qualified for the 1972 Summer Olympics.

Team	Qualified on	Previous appearances in Summer Olympics
Malaysia	2 October 1972	None
Burma	4 April 1972	None
Iran	3 June 1972	1 (1964)
