= 1973 Merdeka Tournament =

Tournament details
- Host country: Federation of Malaya
- Dates: 26 July – 12 August 1973
- Teams: 10
- Venue: 1 (in 1 host city)

Final positions
- Champions: Malaysia (1st title)
- Runners-up: Kuwait
- Third place: Burma
- Fourth place: South Korea

Tournament statistics
- Matches played: 32
- Goals scored: 75 (2.34 per match)

The 1973 Merdeka Tournament was the seventeenth edition of the annual football tournament hosted by Malaysia. It took place from 26 July to 12 August 1973 with ten participating nations.

== Venues ==
Kuala Lumpur
Merdeka Stadium
Capacity: 20,000
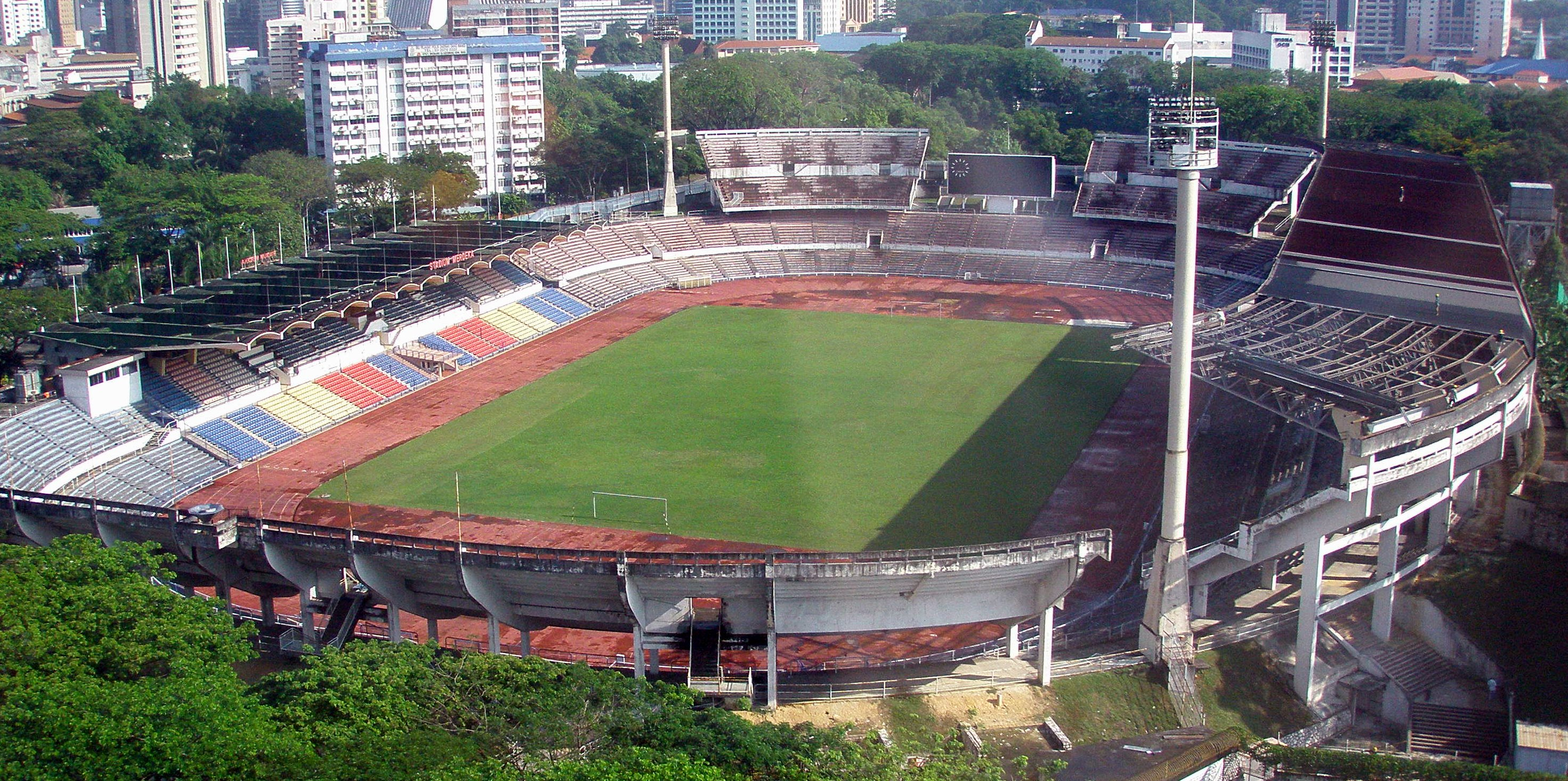

== Preliminary round ==
26 July 1973

| Malaysia | 0–0 | Kuwait |
|---|---|---|
| | Report |
Penalties
| | 3–2 |

Merdeka Stadium, Kuala Lumpur
Attendance: 20,000

26 July 1973

| Singapore | 1–1 | Khmer Republic |
|---|---|---|
| Seak Poh Leong 19' | Report | Sok Sun Hean 59' |
Penalties
| | 2–1 |

Merdeka Stadium, Kuala Lumpur

27 July 1973

| India | 2–1 | South Vietnam |
|---|---|---|
| Magan 32' Nicholas Pereira 57' | Report | Ho Thanh Cang 8' |

Merdeka Stadium, Kuala Lumpur

27 July 1973

| Bangladesh | 2–2 | Thailand |
|---|---|---|
| Enayetur 61'; Salahuddin 88' | Report | Manas Vitayan 27'; Niwatana Sesawasdi 90' |
Penalties
| | 5–6 |

Merdeka Stadium, Kuala Lumpur
Attendance: 3,000

28 July 1973

| Burma | 0–0 | South Korea |
|---|---|---|
| | Report |
Penalties
| | 5–4 |

Merdeka Stadium, Kuala Lumpur

== Group stage ==
=== Group A ===
| Team | Pld | W | D | L | GF | GA | GD | Pts |
|---|---|---|---|---|---|---|---|---|
| South Korea | 4 | 2 | 2 | 0 | 3 | 1 | +2 | 6 |
| Malaysia | 4 | 2 | 1 | 1 | 8 | 4 | +4 | 5 |
| India | 4 | 2 | 1 | 1 | 5 | 4 | +1 | 5 |
| Thailand | 4 | 1 | 2 | 1 | 6 | 5 | +1 | 4 |
| Khmer Republic | 4 | 0 | 0 | 4 | 1 | 9 | −8 | 0 |

28 July 1973

| Malaysia | 1–0 | Khmer Republic |
|---|---|---|
| Soh Chin Ann 20' | Report |

Merdeka Stadium, Kuala Lumpur

29 July 1973

| India | 2–0 | Thailand |
|---|---|---|
| Inder 40', 60' | Report |

Merdeka Stadium, Kuala Lumpur
Referee: Kabal Singh (Malaysia)

30 July 1973

| South Korea | 1–0 | Khmer Republic |
|---|---|---|
| Seung Kee | Report |

Merdeka Stadium, Kuala Lumpur

31 July 1973

| India | 3–0 | Khmer Republic |
|---|---|---|
| Bernard Pereira 7'; Magan; Ulaganathan 60' | Report |

Merdeka Stadium, Kuala Lumpur

1 August 1973

| Malaysia | 2–2 | Thailand |
|---|---|---|
| Wan Hassan 21'; Mokhtar 52' | Report | Parnuwat 70'; Manas Vitayan 86' |

Merdeka Stadium, Kuala Lumpur

2 August 1973

| India | 0–0 | South Korea |

Merdeka Stadium, Kuala Lumpur

4 August 1973 (Note: The game was initially scheduled for 3 August, however, was postponed a day due to the death of Deputy Prime Minister of Malaysia, Tun Dr. Ismail bin Abdul Rahman.)

| South Korea | 0–0 | Thailand |
|---|---|---|
| | Report |

Merdeka Stadium, Kuala Lumpur
4 August 1973

| Malaysia | 4–0 | India |
|---|---|---|
| Rahim 20'; Namat 60'; Harun 62'; Mokhtar 88' | Report |

Merdeka Stadium, Kuala Lumpur

6 August 1973

| Malaysia | 1–2 | South Korea |
|---|---|---|
| Wong Voon Leong 65' | Report | Chung Kang Chi 15'; Kang Tae Hyun 73' |

Merdeka Stadium, Kuala Lumpur

7 August 1973

| Thailand | 4–1 | Khmer Republic |

Merdeka Stadium, Kuala Lumpur

=== Group B ===
| Team | Pld | W | D | L | GF | GA | GD | Pts |
|---|---|---|---|---|---|---|---|---|
| Burma | 4 | 4 | 0 | 0 | 11 | 1 | +10 | 8 |
| Kuwait | 4 | 3 | 0 | 1 | 6 | 4 | +2 | 6 |
| South Vietnam | 4 | 1 | 1 | 2 | 4 | 5 | −1 | 3 |
| Bangladesh | 4 | 0 | 2 | 2 | 3 | 10 | −7 | 2 |
| Singapore | 4 | 0 | 1 | 3 | 1 | 5 | −4 | 1 |

28 July 1973

| Kuwait | 2–0 | Singapore |
|---|---|---|
| Suoud Bohamed 48'; Hussain Mohammed | Report |

Merdeka Stadium, Kuala Lumpur
Attendance: 10,000
Referee: Oei Puh Hwa (Malaysia)

29 July 1973

| South Vietnam | 1–1 | Bangladesh |
|---|---|---|
| Nguyen Van Nong 44' (pen.) | Report | Nannu 50' |

Merdeka Stadium, Kuala Lumpur

30 July 1973

| Burma | 1–0 | Singapore |
|---|---|---|
| Than Soe 54' | Report |

Merdeka Stadium, Kuala Lumpur

31 July 1973

| Kuwait | 2–1 | Bangladesh |
|---|---|---|
| Kameel 19'; Ali Al-Shammari 75' | Report | Enayetur 47' |

Merdeka Stadium, Kuala Lumpur
Attendance: 5,000

2 August 1973

| Burma | 2–1 | South Vietnam |

Merdeka Stadium, Kuala Lumpur
2 August 1973

| Bangladesh | 1–1 | Singapore |
|---|---|---|
| Salahuddin 6' | Report | Shamsuddin Rahmat 20' |

Merdeka Stadium, Kuala Lumpur

5 August 1973

| South Vietnam | 1–0 | Singapore |
|---|---|---|
| Vo Thanh Van 67' | Report |

Merdeka Stadium, Kuala Lumpur
5 August 1973

| Burma | 2–0 | Kuwait |
|---|---|---|
| Than Soe 30'; Aye Kyaing 37' | Report |

Merdeka Stadium, Kuala Lumpur

8 August 1973

| Burma | 6–0 | Bangladesh |
|---|---|---|
| Maung Win Maung 12', ?'; Myo Win Nyunt 28'; Ye Nyunt 44'; Than Soe 62', 64' | Report |

Merdeka Stadium, Kuala Lumpur
8 August 1973

| Kuwait | 2–1 | South Vietnam |
|---|---|---|
| Hussain Mohammed 5', 62' | Report | Quang Duc Vinh 67' |

Merdeka Stadium, Kuala Lumpur

== Ninth place ==
10 August 1973

| Singapore | 3–0 | Khmer Republic |
|---|---|---|
| Lim Tien Jit 15'; Jaffar Yacob 70'; Lee Teik Gnee 80' | Report |

Merdeka Stadium, Kuala Lumpur

== Seventh place ==
12 August 1973

| Thailand | 2–0 | Bangladesh |

Merdeka Stadium, Kuala Lumpur

== Fifth place ==
9 August 1973

| South Vietnam | 1–1 | India |
|---|---|---|
| Nguyen Van Mong | Report | M Prasannan |
Penalties
| Ho Than Cang (penalty scored); Hyunh Van Chien (penalty scored); Cu Sinh (penalty scored); Quong Duo Vin (penalty scored); Duong Van Tho (penalty scored) | 5–4 | Bernard Pereira (penalty scored); Manuel Jayaraj (penalty scored); Nicholas Pereira (penalty scored); Thomas Fernandes (penalty scored) |

Merdeka Stadium, Kuala Lumpur

== Knockout stage ==
=== Semi-finals ===
9 August 1973

| South Korea | 0–1 | Kuwait |
|---|---|---|
| | Report | Kameel 40' |

Merdeka Stadium, Kuala Lumpur
Attendance: 5,000

10 August 1973

| Burma | 1–2 | Malaysia |
|---|---|---|
| Ye Nyunt 28' | Report | Wong Choon Wah 10'; Namat 61' |

Merdeka Stadium, Kuala Lumpur

=== Third place ===
11 August 1973

| Burma | 2–1 | South Korea |
|---|---|---|
| Maung Tin Sein; Shan Pain | Report | Kang Tae Hyun 60' |

Merdeka Stadium, Kuala Lumpur

=== Final ===
12 August 1973

| Malaysia | 3–1 | Kuwait |
|---|---|---|
| Mokhtar ?', 51'; Harun 20' | Report | Hussain Mohammed 2' |

Merdeka Stadium, Kuala Lumpur
