= Maung Maung Tin =

Maung Maung Tin may refer to:

- Maung Maung Tin (prince) (1866–1945), Konbaung prince and writer
- Maung Maung Tin (footballer) (born 1949), Burmese footballer
