= Rahim Abdullah (Malaysian footballer) =

Malaysian footballer (1947–2025)

Personal information
- Full name: Rahim bin Abdullah
- Date of birth: 12 September 1947
- Place of birth: Nibong Tebal, Penang, Malayan Union
- Date of death: 25 March 2025 (aged 77)
- Position: Midfielder

Senior career*
Years	Team	Apps	(Gls)
1966–1968	Penang FA		
1969–1970	Perak FA		
1971–1975	Selangor FA		

International career
1968–1973	Malaysia		

Managerial career
- 1991: Malaysia
- * Club domestic league appearances and goals

Rahim Abdullah (12 September 1947 – 25 March 2025) was a Malaysian footballer who played as a midfielder.

A police officer, Rahim played for Penang FA, Perak FA and Selangor FA during his football career. He also played for the Malaysia national team, and competed in the men's tournament at the 1972 Summer Olympics. He also coached for various teams, including as head coach of the Malaysia national team in 1991.

In 2004, he was inducted in Olympic Council of Malaysia's Hall of Fame for 1972 Summer Olympics football team.

Rahim died on 25 March 2025, at the age of 77.

== Honours ==
Perak

- Malaysia Cup: 1970

Selangor

- Malaysia Cup: 1971, 1972, 1973, 1975

Malaysia

- Merdeka Tournament: 1973
