= Kassem Hamzé =

Lebanese athlete (born 1950)

Personal information
- Date of birth: 2 January 1950 (age 76)
- Position: Midfielder

International career
Years	Team	Apps	(Gls)
1971–1974	Lebanon	8	(1)

Kassem Hamzé (Arabic: قاسم حمزة; born 2 January 1950) is a Lebanese former footballer and sprinter.

As a football player, he played for the Lebanon national football team, scoring during the qualification tournament for the 1972 Summer Olympics in November 1971. As a sprinter, he competed in the men's 400 metres and men's 800 metres at the 1972 Summer Olympics, where he was eliminated in the first round.

== Career statistics ==
=== Football ===
Scores and results list Lebanon's goal tally first, score column indicates score after each Hamzé goal.

List of international goals scored by Kassem Hamzé
No.	Date	Venue	Opponent	Score	Result	Competition
1	19 September 1971	Mithatpaşa Stadium, Istanbul, Turkey	Iraq	1–2	1–2	1972 Summer Olympics qualification
