= Harun Jusoh =

Malaysian footballer

Personal information
- Full name: Harun bin Jusoh
- Date of birth: 2 April 1948
- Date of death: 24 October 2023 (aged 75)
- Position(s): Midfielder

Senior career*
Years	Team	Apps	(Gls)
- Terengganu FA
- *Club domestic league appearances and goals

Harun Jusoh (2 April 1948 - 24 October 2023) is a former Terengganu FA and Malaysia midfield player.

== Career overview ==
A midfielder, Harun was a squad player for the Malaysia team in the 1972 Munich Olympics football competition, and also represented Malaysia when it finished third in the 1974 Asian Games in Iran.

On 11 May 1975, Harun is also part of the Malaysia Selection that played against Arsenal FC in a friendly match which his team won by 2-0 at Merdeka Stadium.

In 2004, he was inducted in Olympic Council of Malaysia's Hall of Fame for 1972 Summer Olympics football team.

== Honours ==
Terengganu FA

- Malaysia Cup runner-up: 1973
- Malaysia FAM Cup: 1969

Malaysia

- Asian Games bronze medal: 1974
- Pestabola Merdeka: 1973
