= Wong Choon Wah =

Malaysian footballer

Personal information
- Date of birth: 31 March 1947
- Place of birth: Malayan Union
- Date of death: 31 January 2014 (aged 66)
- Place of death: Kuala Lumpur, Malaysia
- Position: Midfielder

Senior career*
Years	Team	Apps	(Gls)
1968–1971	Selangor		
1972–1973	South China		
1973–1974	Seiko		
1975–1978	Selangor		

International career
1968–1977	Malaysia	88	(20)
- * Club domestic league appearances and goals

Wong Choon Wah (Chinese: 王春華, 31 March 1947 – 31 January 2014) was a Malaysian footballer.

== Career Overview ==
In Malaysia Cup competitions, Wong played for Selangor, winning the championship five times. From 1972 to 1973, Wong played professional football with South China in Hong Kong. Later, he played for Seiko in the 1973–74 season.

He also competed for Malaysia at the 1972 Summer Olympics and played all three group games. Overall, Wong played 88 times for Malaysia and scored 20 international goals.

On 17 September 2014, FourFourTwo listed him on their list of the top 25 Malaysian footballers of all time.

== Career statistics ==
=== International ===
Scores and results list Malaysia's goal tally first, score column indicates score after each Choon Wah goal.

List of international goals scored by Wong Choon Wah
No.	Date	Venue	Opponent	Score	Result	Competition	Ref.
1	24 November 1968	Bangkok, Thailand	Laos	—	5–0	1968 King's Cup	
2	1 August 1970	Ipoh, Perak, Malaysia	India	—	1–3	1970 Merdeka Tournament	
3	4 August 1970	Kuala Lumpur, Malaysia	Taiwan	—	3–1	1970 Merdeka Tournament	
4	8 May 1971	Seoul, South Korea	Thailand	—	4–1	1971 President's Cup Football Tournament	
5	8 May 1971	Seoul, South Korea	Thailand	—	4–1	1971 President's Cup Football Tournament	
6	22 May 1971	Bangkok, Thailand	Brunei	—	8–0	1972 AFC Asian Cup qualification	
7	26 May 1971	Bangkok, Thailand	Cambodia	—	2–1	1972 AFC Asian Cup qualification	
8	2 October 1971	Seoul, South Korea	Philippines	—	5–1	1972 Summer Olympics – Asian Qualifiers	
9	2 October 1971	Seoul, South Korea	Philippines	—	5–1	1972 Summer Olympics – Asian Qualifiers	
10	12 December 1971	Kuala Lumpur, Malaysia	Laos	—	5–0	1971 SEAP Games	
11	14 December 1971	Kuala Lumpur, Malaysia	Thailand	—	4–2	1971 SEAP Games	
12	15 December 1971	Kuala Lumpur, Malaysia	Cambodia	—	3–0	1971 SEAP Games	
13	15 December 1971	Kuala Lumpur, Malaysia	Cambodia	—	3–0	1971 SEAP Games	
14	19 July 1972	Ipoh, Perak, Malaysia	Cambodia	—	6–1	1972 Merdeka Tournament	
15	10 August 1973	Kuala Lumpur, Malaysia	Burma	—	2–1	1973 Merdeka Tournament	
16	24 September 1973	Seoul, South Korea	Thailand	—	5–1	1973 President's Cup Football Tournament	
17	24 September 1973	Seoul, South Korea	Thailand	—	5–1	1973 President's Cup Football Tournament	
18	25 July 1974	Ipoh, Perak, Malaysia	India	—	4–1	1974 Merdeka Tournament	
19	13 June 1975	Jakarta, Indonesia	Thailand	—	1–0	1975 Jakarta Anniversary Tournament	
20	8 August 1975	Kuala Lumpur, Malaysia	Hong Kong	—	3–1	1975 Merdeka Tournament	

== Style of play ==
According to journalist Tony Mariadass, midfield general Choon Wah's style of play was similar to that of Luka Modrić – elegant, elusive, artistic and dangerous.

== Honours ==
Selangor

- Malaysia Cup: 1968, 1969, 1971, 1975, 1976

South China

- Hong Kong First Division: 1971–72

Seiko

- Hong Kong Senior Shield: 1973–74

Malaysia

- Merdeka Tournament: 1968, 1973, 1974

Individual

- OCM Hall of Fame: 2004
- IFFHS Men's All Time Malaysia Dream Team: 2022

== See also ==
- Football at the 1972 Summer Olympics
