= Football at the SEA Games =

- Organiser(s): SEAGF; AFF
- Founded: 1959 (men); 1985 (women)
- Region: Southeast Asia
- Teams: at most 11 (men) at most 11 (women)
- Current champions: Vietnam (men; 4th title); Philippines (women; 1st title)
- Most championships: Thailand (men; 16 titles); Vietnam (women; 8 titles)
- 2025 Southeast Asian Games

Football has been part of the SEA Games sport since the 1959 edition. The women's football competition was held for the first time in 1985 in Thailand.

From the 2001 SEA Games to the 2015 SEA Games and again since 2021 SEA Games, the men's teams was restricted to under-23 plus additional three over-23 players maximum for each squad.

Since the 2017 SEA Games, the age limit for men's teams is under-22. At the 2019 SEA Games, two over-aged players were allowed for each team while the 2023 edition, 2025 edition and 2027 edition saw no overage players allowed.

Thailand and Vietnam are the only two nations to have won both the men's and women's gold medals in a Southeast Asian Games football tournament. Thailand achieved this feat five times (in 1985, 1995, 1997, 2007, and 2013), while Vietnam accomplished it twice in 2019 and 2021.

== Results ==
=== Men's tournament ===
==== SEAP Games ====
Year	Host	Gold medal match			Bronze medal match		
Year	Host	Gold Medal	Score	Silver Medal	Bronze Medal	Score	Fourth Place
1959; Details	(Thailand); Bangkok	South Vietnam	3–1	Thailand	Malaya	^{1}	Burma
1961; Details	(Myanmar); Rangoon	Malaya	2–0	Burma	South Vietnam; Thailand	1–1 ^{2}	
1965; Details	(Malaysia); Kuala Lumpur	Burma; Thailand	2–2 ^{2}		South Vietnam	2–0	Malaysia
1967; Details	(Thailand); Bangkok	Burma	2–1	South Vietnam	Thailand	5–2	Laos
1969; Details	(Myanmar); Rangoon	Burma	3–0	Thailand	Laos; Malaysia	^{3}	
1971; Details	(Malaysia); Kuala Lumpur	Burma	2–1	Malaysia	South Vietnam; Thailand	0–0 ^{2}	
1973; Details	Singapore	Burma	3–2	South Vietnam	Malaysia	3–0	Singapore
1975; Details	(Thailand); Bangkok	Thailand	2–1	Malaysia	Burma; Singapore	2–2 (a.e.t.)^{2}	

^{1} Decided by round-robin standings.
^{2} The title was shared.
^{3} There was no bronze medal game held.

==== SEA Games ====
Year	Host	Gold medal match			Bronze medal match		
Year	Host	Gold Medal	Score	Silver Medal	Bronze Medal	Score	Fourth Place
National teams tournament (1977–1999)
1977; Details	(Malaysia); Kuala Lumpur	Malaysia	2–0	Thailand	Burma	2–0; Awarded^{4}	Indonesia
1979; Details	(Indonesia); Jakarta	Malaysia	1–0	Indonesia	Thailand	(RR)^{5}	Singapore
1981; Details	(Philippines); Manila	Thailand	2–1	Malaysia	Indonesia	2–0	Singapore
1983; Details	Singapore	Thailand	2–1	Singapore	Malaysia	5–0	Brunei
1985; Details	(Thailand); Bangkok	Thailand	2–0	Singapore	Malaysia	1–0	Indonesia
1987; Details	(Indonesia); Jakarta	Indonesia	1–0 (a.e.t.)	Malaysia	Thailand	4–0	Burma
1989; Details	(Malaysia); Kuala Lumpur	Malaysia	3–1	Singapore	Indonesia	1–1 (a.e.t.); 9–8 (p)	Thailand
1991; Details	(Philippines); Manila	Indonesia	0–0 (a.e.t.); 4–3 (p)	Thailand	Singapore	2–0	Philippines
1993; Details	Singapore	Thailand	4–3	Myanmar	Singapore	3–1	Indonesia
1995; Details	(Thailand); Chiang Mai	Thailand	4–0	Vietnam	Singapore	1–0	Myanmar
1997; Details	(Indonesia); Jakarta	Thailand	1–1 (a.e.t.); 4–2 (p)	Indonesia	Vietnam	1–0	Singapore
1999; Details	(Brunei); Bandar Seri Begawan	Thailand	2–0	Vietnam	Indonesia	0–0 (a.e.t.); 4–2 (p)	Singapore
Under-23 National teams tournament (2001–2015)
2001; Details	(Malaysia); Kuala Lumpur	Thailand	1–0	Malaysia	Myanmar	1–0	Indonesia
2003; Details	(Vietnam); Hanoi; Ho Chi Minh City	Thailand	2–1 (g.g.)	Vietnam	Malaysia	1–1 (a.e.t.); 4–2 (p)	Myanmar
2005; Details	(Philippines); Bacolod	Thailand	3–0	Vietnam	Malaysia	1–0	Indonesia
2007; Details	(Thailand); Nakhon Ratchasima	Thailand	2–0	Myanmar	Singapore	5–0	Vietnam
2009; Details	(Laos); Vientiane	Malaysia	1–0	Vietnam	Singapore	3–1	Laos
2011; Details	(Indonesia); Jakarta	Malaysia	1–1 (a.e.t.); 4–3 (p)	Indonesia	Myanmar	4–1	Vietnam
2013; Details	(Myanmar); Naypyidaw; Yangon	Thailand	1–0	Indonesia	Singapore	2–1	Malaysia
2015; Details	Singapore	Thailand	3–0	Myanmar	Vietnam	5–0	Indonesia
Under-22 National teams tournament (2017–present)
2017; Details	(Malaysia); Kuala Lumpur	Thailand	1–0	Malaysia	Indonesia	3–1	Myanmar
2019; Details	(Philippines); Manila; Biñan; Imus	Vietnam	3–0	Indonesia	Myanmar	2–2; 5–4 (p)	Cambodia
2021; Details	(Vietnam); Hanoi; Nam Định; Phú Thọ	Vietnam	1–0	Thailand	Indonesia	1–1; 4–3 (p)	Malaysia
2023; Details	(Cambodia); Phnom Penh	Indonesia	5–2 (a.e.t.)	Thailand	Vietnam	3–1	Myanmar
2025; Details	(Thailand); Bangkok; Chiang Mai	Vietnam	3–2 (a.e.t.)	Thailand	Malaysia	2–1	Philippines

^{4} Indonesia did not turn up at the appointed time. After waiting for 15 minutes the referee called off the game and reported to the technical committee which awarded the bronze to Burma.
^{5} Decided by round-robin standings.
^{6} The 1985 tournament featured only three teams, and as a result, no fourth place was awarded.

=== Women's tournament ===
==== SEA Games ====
Year	Host	Gold medal match			Bronze medal match		
Year	Host	Gold Medal	Score	Silver Medal	Bronze Medal	Score	Fourth Place
1985; Details	(Thailand); Bangkok	Thailand	(RR)^{1}	Singapore	Philippines	^{6}	
1995; Details	(Thailand); Chiang Mai	Thailand	1–0	Malaysia	Myanmar	(RR)^{1}	Philippines
1997; Details	(Indonesia); Jakarta	Thailand	5–1	Myanmar	Vietnam	2–0	Indonesia
2001; Details	(Malaysia); Kuala Lumpur	Vietnam	4–0	Thailand	Myanmar	3–0	Indonesia
2003; Details	(Vietnam); Hải Phòng; Nam Định	Vietnam	2–1	Myanmar	Thailand	6–1	Malaysia
2005; Details	(Philippines); Marikina	Vietnam	1–0	Myanmar	Thailand	(RR)^{1}	Philippines
2007; Details	(Thailand); Nakhon Ratchasima	Thailand	2–0	Vietnam	Myanmar	5–0	Laos
2009; Details	(Laos); Vientiane	Vietnam	0–0 (a.e.t.); 3–0 (p)	Thailand	Myanmar	(RR)^{1}	Laos
2013; Details	(Myanmar); Mandalay	Thailand	2–1	Vietnam	Myanmar	6–0	Malaysia
2017; Details	(Malaysia); Kuala Lumpur	Vietnam	(RR)^{1}	Thailand	Myanmar	(RR)^{1}	Philippines
2019; Details	(Philippines); Manila; Biñan	Vietnam	1–0 (a.e.t.)	Thailand	Myanmar	2–1	Philippines
2021; Details	(Vietnam); Quảng Ninh	Vietnam	1–0	Thailand	Philippines	2–1	Myanmar
2023; Details	(Cambodia); Phnom Penh	Vietnam	2–0	Myanmar	Thailand	6–0	Cambodia
2025; Details	(Thailand); Chonburi	Philippines	0–0 (a.e.t.); 6–5 (p)	Vietnam	Thailand	2–0	Indonesia
^{1} Played as round-robin.

== Medal tally ==
=== Men's tournament ===
Rank	Nation	Gold	Silver	Bronze	Total
1	Thailand	16	7	5	28
2	Malaysia^{[1]}	6	6	8	20
3	Myanmar^{[2]}	5	4	5	14
4	Vietnam^{[3]}	4	7	6	17
5	Indonesia	3	5	5	13
6	Singapore	0	3	7	10
7	Laos	0	0	1	1
Totals (7 entries)		34	32	37	103

- ^[1] – Competed as Malaya in the inaugural games until 1961.
- ^[2] – Competed as Burma until 1987.
- ^[3] – Including South Vietnam.

=== Women's tournament ===
Rank	Nation	Gold	Silver	Bronze	Total
1	Vietnam	8	3	1	12
2	Thailand	5	5	4	14
3	Philippines	1	0	2	3
4	Myanmar	0	4	7	11
5	Malaysia	0	1	0	1
5	Singapore	0	1	0	1
Totals (6 entries)		14	14	14	42

=== All tournaments ===
Rank	NOC	Gold	Silver	Bronze	Total
1	Thailand	21	12	9	42
2	Vietnam	12	10	7	29
3	Malaysia	6	7	8	21
4	Myanmar	5	8	12	25
5	Indonesia	3	5	5	13
6	Philippines	1	0	2	3
7	Singapore	0	4	7	11
8	Laos	0	0	1	1
Totals (8 entries)		48	46	51	145

== See also ==
- Futsal at the SEA Games
- AFF U-23 Championship
- AFF Women's Championship
