= Football at the 1970 Asian Games =

- Date: 9–20 December
- Nations: 10

Medalists
gold medal	South Korea
gold medal	Burma
bronze medal	India

Football was contested as part of the programme for the 1970 Asian Games which was hosted in Bangkok, Thailand from 9 to 20 December 1970. It was the sixth edition of the men's football tournament at the multi-sport event organised by the Asian Games Federation.

The football tournament began with the first matches of the first group stage on 10 December 1970 and ended with the gold medal match on 20 December 1970. Defending champions Burma and South Korea contested the final. No goals were scored in regulation time or in extra time and the gold medal was shared between both teams. In the bronze medal match, India defeated Japan 1–0.

== Background ==
Football had been part of the Asian Games programme following the debut of the men's competition at the inaugural 1951 Asian Games in India.

India and Taiwan held the record for gold medals having both won the football tournament twice. Burma were the defending champions after defeating Iran 1–0 in the gold medal match at the 1966 Asian Games in Thailand.

== Format ==
In total, 10 teams took part in the competition. They were drawn into three single round robin groups – two of three teams and one of four teams. The group winners and runners-up were then drawn into two single round robin groups of three teams. The winners and runners-up of the second group stage would then contest the semi-finals which would decide the teams contesting the gold and bronze medal matches. A fifth-place play-off was also held between the two teams finishing third in the second group stage.

=== Participants ===
- Burma
- India
- Indonesia
- Iran
- Japan
- Khmer Republic
- Malaysia
- South Korea
- Thailand
- South Vietnam

== First group stage ==
=== Group A ===
India and Thailand advanced to the second group stage.

==== Table ====
Pos	Team	Pld	W	D	L	GF	GA	GR	Pts	Qualification
1	India	2	1	1	0	4	2	2.000	3	Qualification for the second group stage
2	Thailand	2	1	1	0	3	2	1.500	3	Qualification for the second group stage
3	South Vietnam	2	0	0	2	0	3	0.000	0	

==== Matches ====
10 December 1970

India	2–2	Thailand
Bhowmick 35', 57'		Sahas 13'; Preecha 21'

11 December 1970

India	2–0	South Vietnam
Habib 76'; Rajvi 85'

13 December 1970

Thailand	1–0	South Vietnam
Sudtha 41'

=== Group B ===
Japan and Burma advanced to the second group stage.

==== Table ====
Pos	Team	Pld	W	D	L	GF	GA	GR	Pts	Qualification
1	Japan	3	3	0	0	4	1	4.000	6	Qualification for the second group stage
2	Burma	3	2	0	1	4	3	1.333	4	Qualification for the second group stage
3	Khmer Republic	3	1	0	2	3	3	1.000	2	
4	Malaysia	3	0	0	3	0	4	0.000	0	

==== Matches ====
10 December 1970

Japan	1–0	Malaysia
Kamamoto 34'

10 December 1970

Burma	2–1	Khmer Republic
Win Maung 26'; Myo Win Nyunt 50'		Doeuk Miladord 90' (pen.)

12 December 1970

Japan	1–0	Khmer Republic
Yuguchi 58'

12 December 1970

Burma	1–0	Malaysia
Win Maung 33'

14 December 1970

Japan	2–1	Burma
Miyamoto 50'; Ueda 75'		Win Maung 28'

14 December 1970

Malaysia	0–2	Khmer Republic
		Slayman Salim 12'; Pen Phath 68'

=== Group C ===
South Korea and Indonesia advanced to the second group stage.

==== Table ====
Pos	Team	Pld	W	D	L	GF	GA	GR	Pts	Qualification
1	South Korea	2	1	1	0	1	0	—	3	Qualification for the second group stage
2	Indonesia	2	0	2	0	2	2	1.000	2	Qualification for the second group stage
3	Iran	2	0	1	1	2	3	0.667	1	

==== Matches ====
10 December 1970

Indonesia	2–2	Iran
Soentoro 71'; Idris 83'		Ashtiani 37'; Sharafi 77'

11 December 1970

Iran	0–1	South Korea
		Lee Hoe-taik 59'

13 December 1970

Indonesia	0–0	South Korea

== Second group stage ==
=== Group A ===
Japan and India advanced to the semi-finals and Indonesia advanced to the fifth-place play-off.

==== Table ====
Pos	Team	Pld	W	D	L	GF	GA	GR	Pts	Qualification
1	Japan	2	2	0	0	3	1	3.000	4	Qualification for the semi-finals
2	India	2	1	0	1	3	1	3.000	2	Qualification for the semi-finals
3	Indonesia	2	0	0	2	1	5	0.200	0	Qualification for the fifth-place play-off

==== Matches ====
15 December 1970

India	3–0	Indonesia
Nataraj 74'; Rajvi 79'; Thapa 83'

16 December 1970

Indonesia	1–2	Japan
Sihasale 74'		Kamamoto 40', 64'

17 December 1970

Japan	1–0	India
Kimura 88'

=== Group B ===
Burma and South Korea advanced to the semi-finals and Thailand advanced to the fifth-place play-off.

==== Table ====
Pos	Team	Pld	W	D	L	GF	GA	GR	Pts	Qualification
1	Burma	2	1	1	0	3	2	1.500	3	Qualification for the semi-finals
2	South Korea	2	1	0	1	2	2	1.000	2	Qualification for the semi-finals
3	Thailand	2	0	1	1	3	4	0.750	1	Qualification for the fifth-place play-off

==== Matches ====
15 December 1970

South Korea	2–1	Thailand
Park Lee-chun 9'; Park Soo-il 22'		Chatchai 72'

16 December 1970

Thailand	2–2	Burma
Niwat 56'; Chatchai 58'		Win Maung 39', 49'

17 December 1970

Burma	1–0	South Korea
Than Soe 70'

== Fifth-place play-off ==
Indonesia defeated Thailand to finish fifth.

19 December 1970

Indonesia	1–0	Thailand
Kadir 32'

== Semi-finals ==
South Korea defeated Japan and Burma defeated India to advance to the gold medal match.

18 December 1970

Japan	1–2 (a.e.t.)	South Korea
Ueda 73'		Jeong Kang-ji 15'; Park Lee-chun 114'

18 December 1970

Burma	2–0	India
Ye Nyunt 15', 48'

== Bronze medal match ==
India defeated Japan to win the bronze medal.

19 December 1970

Japan	0–1	India
		Manjit Singh 36'

== Gold medal match ==
After a goalless 90 minutes and extra time, the gold medal was shared between South Korea and Burma. As a result, the silver medal was not awarded.

20 December 1970

South Korea	0–0 (a.e.t.)	Burma
