= Ye Nyunt =

Burmese footballer

Personal information
- Date of birth: 3 June 1950 (age 76)
- Place of birth: Bago Region, Burma
- Height: 1.69 m (5 ft 7 in)
- Position: Winger

Senior career*
Years	Team	Apps	(Gls)
- Customs

International career
- Myanmar
- * Club domestic league appearances and goals

Ye Nyunt (born 3 June 1950) is a Burmese former footballer who played as a winger. He represented the Burma national team in the 1960s and 1970s.

== Early life ==
Nyunt was born on 3 June 1950. He hailed from Bago Region.

== Club career ==
Nyunt played for the Customs team in domestic football.

== International career ==
Ye Nyunt represented the Burma national team in the 1960s and 1970s as a regular goalscorer. He competed in the men's tournament at the 1972 Summer Olympics.

== Personal life ==
On 12 January 2022, Ye Nyunt was honoured by the Bago Region Government for his achievements as a former international footballer.

== Career statistics ==
=== International goals ===
Scores and results list Burma's goal tally first, score column indicates score after each Ye Nyunt goal.

List of international goals scored by Ye Nyunt
No.	Date	Venue	Opponent	Score	Result	Competition	Ref.
1	14 May 1968	Amjadieh Stadium, Tehran, Iran	Israel	1–0	1–0	1968 AFC Asian Cup	
2	10 August 1968	Merdeka Stadium, Kuala Lumpur, Malaysia	South Vietnam		3–0	1968 Merdeka Tournament	
3	21 August 1968	Merdeka Stadium, Kuala Lumpur, Malaysia	Indonesia		2–1	1968 Merdeka Tournament	
4	21 August 1968	Merdeka Stadium, Kuala Lumpur, Malaysia	Indonesia		2–1	1968 Merdeka Tournament	
5	20 November 1968	Bangkok, Thailand	Laos		3–0	1968 King's Cup	
6	1 November 1969	Merdeka Stadium, Kuala Lumpur, Malaysia	India		6–0	1969 Merdeka Tournament	
7	1 November 1969	Merdeka Stadium, Kuala Lumpur, Malaysia	India		6–0	1969 Merdeka Tournament	
8	1 November 1969	Merdeka Stadium, Kuala Lumpur, Malaysia	India		6–0	1969 Merdeka Tournament	
9	3 August 1970	Merdeka Stadium, Kuala Lumpur, Malaysia	India	1–0	2–0	1970 Merdeka Tournament	
10	18 December 1970	Bangkok, Thailand	India		2–0	1970 Asian Games	
11	18 December 1970	Bangkok, Thailand	India		2–0	1970 Asian Games	
12	9 June 1971	Senayan Stadium, Jakarta, Indonesia	Singapore		6–0	1971 Jakarta Anniversary Tournament	
13	9 June 1971	Senayan Stadium, Jakarta, Indonesia	Singapore		6–0	1971 Jakarta Anniversary Tournament	
14	9 June 1971	Senayan Stadium, Jakarta, Indonesia	Singapore		6–0	1971 Jakarta Anniversary Tournament	
15	11 June 1971	Senayan Stadium, Jakarta, Indonesia	Malaysia		5–1	1971 Jakarta Anniversary Tournament	
16	6 August 1971	Merdeka Stadium, Kuala Lumpur, Malaysia	India		9–1	1971 Merdeka Tournament	
17	6 August 1971	Merdeka Stadium, Kuala Lumpur, Malaysia	India		9–1	1971 Merdeka Tournament	
18	6 August 1971	Merdeka Stadium, Kuala Lumpur, Malaysia	India		9–1	1971 Merdeka Tournament	
19	15 December 1971	Merdeka Stadium, Kuala Lumpur, Malaysia	Singapore		8–1	1971 SEAP Games	
20	15 December 1971	Merdeka Stadium, Kuala Lumpur, Malaysia	Singapore		8–1	1971 SEAP Games	
21	15 December 1971	Merdeka Stadium, Kuala Lumpur, Malaysia	Singapore		8–1	1971 SEAP Games	
22	15 December 1971	Merdeka Stadium, Kuala Lumpur, Malaysia	Singapore		8–1	1971 SEAP Games	
23	17 December 1971	Merdeka Stadium, Kuala Lumpur, Malaysia	Thailand		3–1	1971 SEAP Games	
24	29 March 1972	Bogyoke Aung San Stadium, Rangoon, Burma	Thailand		7–0	1972 Summer Olympics Qualifiers	
25	2 April 1972	Bogyoke Aung San Stadium, Rangoon, Burma	Indonesia		3–0	1972 Summer Olympics Qualifiers	
26	21 September 1972	Dongdaemun Stadium, Seoul, South Korea	Philippines		4–0	1972 President's Cup	
27	27 September 1972	Dongdaemun Stadium, Seoul, South Korea	South Korea		1–0	1972 President's Cup	
28	8 August 1973	Merdeka Stadium, Kuala Lumpur, Malaysia	Bangladesh		6–0	1973 Merdeka Tournament	
29	10 August 1973	Merdeka Stadium, Kuala Lumpur, Malaysia	Malaysia		1–2	1973 Merdeka Tournament	
30	2 September 1973	National Stadium, Singapore	Laos		8–0	1973 SEAP Games	
31	3 September 1973	National Stadium, Singapore	South Vietnam		3–2	1973 SEAP Games	
32	6 September 1973	National Stadium, Singapore	Malaysia		1–0	1973 SEAP Games	
33	3 September 1974	Amjadieh Stadium, Tehran, Iran	Bahrain		4–0	1974 Asian Games	
34	3 September 1974	Amjadieh Stadium, Tehran, Iran	Bahrain		4–0	1974 Asian Games	
35	7 September 1974	Aryamehr Stadium, Tehran, Iran	Pakistan		5–1	1974 Asian Games	
36	24 December 1975	Bangkok, Thailand	Singapore		6–0	1975 King's Cup	
37	24 December 1975	Bangkok, Thailand	Singapore		6–0	1975 King's Cup	

== Honours ==
Burma

- Asian Games Gold medal: 1970
- AFC Asian Cup runner-up: 1968
- King's Cup runner-up: 1968
