= Football at the 1973 SEAP Games =

Football at the 1973 Southeast Asian Peninsular Games
- Venue: 1 (in 1 host city)
- Dates: 1 September - 8 September 1973
- Nations: 6

Football was contested as part of the programme for the 1973 Southeast Asian Peninsular Games which was hosted in Singapore from 1 to 8 September 1973. It was the seventh edition of the men's football tournament at the multi-sport event organised by the SEAP Games Federation Committee.

The football tournament began with the first matches of the group stage on 1 September 1973 and ended with the gold medal match on 8 September 1973. Four-time defending champions Burma and South Vietnam contested the final. Burma defeated South Vietnam 3–2 to win the gold medal. In the bronze medal match, Malaysia defeated hosts Singapore 3–0.

== Background ==
Football had been part of the Southeast Asian Peninsular Games programme following the debut of the men's competition at the inaugural 1959 SEAP Games in Thailand. Burma were four-time defending champions after defeating Malaysia 2–1 in the gold medal match. Burma were also the most successful team having won the gold medal four times previously.

== Format ==
In total, six teams took part in the competition. They were drawn into two single round robin groups of three teams. The winners and runners-up would then contest the semi-finals which would decide the teams contesting the gold and bronze medal matches.

=== Participants ===
- Burma
- Malaysia
- Thailand
- South Vietnam
- Laos
- Singapore

== Venue ==
Matches were played at the National Stadium in Singapore.

Singapore is located in Singapore	Singapore
Singapore is located in Singapore	National Stadium
Singapore is located in Singapore	Capacity: 55,000

== Group stage ==
=== Group A ===
Singapore and Malaysia advanced to the semi-finals.

==== Table ====
Pos	Team	Pld	W	D	L	GF	GA	GD	Pts	Qualification
1	Singapore	2	1	1	0	1	0	+1	3	Advance to Knockout stage
2	Malaysia	2	0	2	0	1	1	0	2	Advance to Knockout stage
3	Thailand	2	0	1	1	1	2	−1	1	

==== Matches ====
1 September 1973

Singapore	1–0	Thailand
Patchareon 28' (o.g.)

National Stadium, Singapore

2 September 1973

Malaysia	1–1	Thailand
Rochana 2' (o.g.)		Sudsa-art 35'

National Stadium, Singapore

4 September 1973

Singapore	0–0	Malaysia

National Stadium, Singapore
Attendance: 35,000

=== Group B ===
Burma and South Vietnam advanced to the semi-finals.

==== Table ====
Pos	Team	Pld	W	D	L	GF	GA	GD	Pts	Qualification
1	Burma	2	2	0	0	11	2	+9	4	Advance to Knockout stage
2	South Vietnam	2	1	0	1	7	4	+3	2	Advance to Knockout stage
3	Laos	2	0	0	2	1	13	−12	0	

==== Matches ====
2 September 1973

Burma	8–0	Laos
Ye Nyunt 20'; Than Soe 29', 81'; Win Maung 39', 43'; Khin Maung Lay 80', 85'; Mya Kyaing 87'

National Stadium, Singapore

3 September 1973

Burma	3–2	South Vietnam
Win Maung 9'; Mya Kyaing 15'; Ye Nyunt 57'		Nguyễn Văn Mộng 24' (pen.); Cù Sinh 45'

National Stadium, Singapore

4 September 1973

South Vietnam	5–1	Laos

National Stadium, Singapore

== Semi-finals ==
Burma and South Vietnam advanced to the gold medal match.

6 September 1973

Burma	1–0	Malaysia
Ye Nyunt 68'

National Stadium, Singapore

6 September 1973

Singapore	1–1 (a.e.t.)	South Vietnam
Quah Kim Lye 61'		Cù Sinh 63'
Penalties
Seak Poh Leong (penalty missed); Noh (penalty scored); Yaqoob (penalty scored); Kassim (penalty scored); Kumar (penalty missed)	3–5	(penalty scored) Dương Văn Tha; (penalty scored) Cù Sinh; (penalty scored) Huỳnh Văn Chiểu; (penalty scored) Nguyễn Vinh Quang; (penalty scored) Lê Văn Tú

National Stadium, Singapore
Attendance: 60,000

== Bronze medal match ==
Malaysia defeated Singapore to win the bronze medal.

7 September 1973

Singapore	0–3	Malaysia
		Reduan 6'; Dahari 34'; Visvanathan 84'

National Stadium, Singapore

== Gold medal match ==
Burma defeated South Vietnam to win the gold medal.

8 September 1973

Burma	3–2	South Vietnam
Mya Kyaing 39', 51', 56'		Trần Văn Xinh 16'; Nguyễn Văn Mộng 84' (pen.)

National Stadium, Singapore

== Goalscorers ==
There were 33 goals scored in 10 matches, for an average of 3.3 goals per match.

5 goals

- (Myanmar) Mya Kyaing

3 goals

- (Myanmar) Win Maung
- (Myanmar) Ye Nyunt

2 goals

- (Myanmar) Khin Maung Lay
- (Myanmar) Than Soe
- (South Vietnam) Cù Sinh
- (South Vietnam) Nguyễn Văn Mộng

1 goal

- (Malaysia) Mokhtar Dahari
- (Malaysia) Radakrishnan Visvanathan
- (Malaysia) Reduan Abdullah
- (Singapore) Quah Kim Lye
- (South Vietnam) Trần Văn Xinh
- (Thailand) Sudtha Sudsa-art

1 own goal

- (Thailand) Saman Rochana
- (Thailand) Thinakorn Patchareon
