= Win Maung (footballer) =

Burmese footballer

Personal information
- Date of birth: 12 May 1949 (age 77)
- Place of birth: Bago Region, Burma
- Height: 1.76 m (5 ft 9 in)
- Position: Center-forward

Senior career*
Years	Team	Apps	(Gls)
- Burma Army

International career
1962–1980	Myanmar		(37)
Medal record
Representing Burma
Gold medal – first place	1970 Bangkok	Team
- * Club domestic league appearances and goals

Win Maung (born 12 May 1949) is a Burmese footballer who played as a forward. He represented the Burma national team in the 1960s and 1970s.

== Early life ==
Win Maung hailed from Aung San Pyi Tharyar Ward of Pyay Township, Bago Region.

== Club career ==
Win Maung represented the Burma Army football team in domestic football.

== International career ==
Win Maung represented the Burma national team in the 1960s and 1970s as a regular goalscorer. He competed in the men's tournament at the 1972 Summer Olympics.

== Personal life ==
Win Maung served in the Myanmar Army since 1961, retiring in 2000. On 12 January 2022, he was honoured by the Bago Region Government for his achievements as a former international footballer.

== Career statistics ==
=== International goals ===
Scores and results list Myanmar's goal tally first, score column indicates score after each Win Maung goal.

List of international goals scored by Win Maung
No.	Date	Venue	Opponent	Score	Result	Competition	Ref.
1	30 August 1964	Merdeka Stadium, Kuala Lumpur, Malaysia	Taiwan		2–4	1964 Merdeka Tournament	
2	23 August 1967	Merdeka Stadium, Kuala Lumpur, Malaysia	South Vietnam		3–0	1967 Merdeka Tournament	
3	23 August 1967	Merdeka Stadium, Kuala Lumpur, Malaysia	South Vietnam		3–0	1967 Merdeka Tournament	
4	16 November 1967	Aung San Stadium, Rangoon, Myanamr	Cambodia	1–0	1–0	1968 AFC Asian Cup qualification	
5	3 August 1970	Merdeka Stadium, Kuala Lumpur, Malaysia	India	2–0	2–0	1970 Merdeka Tournament	
6	10 December 1970	Bangkok, Thailand	Khmer Republic	1–0	2–1	1970 Asian Games	
7	12 December 1970	Bangkok, Thailand	Malaysia	1–0	1–0	1970 Asian Games	
8	14 December 1970	Bangkok, Thailand	Japan	1–0	1–2	1970 Asian Games	
9	16 December 1970	Bangkok, Thailand	Thailand	1–0	2–2	1970 Asian Games	
10	16 December 1970	Bangkok, Thailand	Thailand	2–0	2–2	1970 Asian Games	
11	8 May 1971	Dongdaemun Stadium, Seoul, South Korea	Indonesia	3–1	3–1	1971 President's Cup	
12	11 June 1971	Senayan Stadium, Jakarta, Indonesia	Malaysia		5–1	1971 Jakarta Anniversary Tournament	
13	16 June 1971	Senayan Stadium, Jakarta, Indonesia	Indonesia	1–0	1–0	1971 Jakarta Anniversary Tournament	
14	6 August 1971	Merdeka Stadium, Kuala Lumpur, Malaysia	India		9–1	1971 Merdeka Tournament	
15	6 August 1971	Merdeka Stadium, Kuala Lumpur, Malaysia	India		9–1	1971 Merdeka Tournament	
16	11 August 1971	Merdeka Stadium, Kuala Lumpur, Malaysia	Hong Kong	2–0	4–0	1971 Merdeka Tournament	
17	15 December 1971	Merdeka Stadium, Kuala Lumpur, Malaysia	Singapore	3–0	8–1	1971 SEAP Games	
18	18 December 1971	Merdeka Stadium, Kuala Lumpur, Malaysia	Malaysia	1–0	2–1	1971 SEAP Games	
19	18 December 1971	Merdeka Stadium, Kuala Lumpur, Malaysia	Malaysia	2–1	2–1	1971 SEAP Games	
20	21 March 1972	Aung San Stadium, Rangoon, Myanmar	India	3–0	4–3	1972 Summer Olympics qualification	
21	21 March 1972	Aung San Stadium, Rangoon, Myanmar	India	4–1	4–3	1972 Summer Olympics qualification	
22	24 March 1972	Aung San Stadium, Rangoon, Myanmar	Ceylon	3–0	5–1	1972 Summer Olympics qualification	
23	29 March 1972	Aung San Stadium, Rangoon, Myanmar	Thailand	4–0	7–0	1972 Summer Olympics qualification	
24	29 March 1972	Aung San Stadium, Rangoon, Myanmar	Thailand	5–0	7–0	1972 Summer Olympics qualification	
25	2 April 1972	Aung San Stadium, Rangoon, Myanmar	Indonesia	1–0	3–0	1972 Summer Olympics qualification	
26	2 April 1972	Aung San Stadium, Rangoon, Myanmar	Indonesia	2–0	3–0	1972 Summer Olympics qualification	
27	21 September 1972	Seoul, South Korea	Philippines	1–0	4–0	1972 President's Cup	
28	21 September 1972	Seoul, South Korea	Philippines	2–0	4–0	1972 President's Cup	
29	30 September 1972	Seoul, South Korea	Indonesia	1–0	3–1	1972 President's Cup	
30	30 September 1972	Seoul, South Korea	Indonesia	2–1	3–1	1972 President's Cup	
31	30 September 1972	Seoul, South Korea	Indonesia	3–1	3–1	1972 President's Cup	
32	8 August 1973	Merdeka Stadium, Kuala Lumpur, Malaysia	Bangladesh	1–0	6–0	1973 Merdeka Tournament	
33	8 August 1973	Merdeka Stadium, Kuala Lumpur, Malaysia	Bangladesh		6–0	1973 Merdeka Tournament	
34	2 September 1973	National Stadium, Kallang, Singapore	Laos	3–0	8–0	1973 SEAP Games	
35	2 September 1973	National Stadium, Kallang, Singapore	Laos	4–0	8–0	1973 SEAP Games	
36	3 September 1973	National Stadium, Kallang, Singapore	South Vietnam	1–0	3–2	1973 SEAP Games	
37	26 September 1973	Dongdaemun Stadium, Seoul, South Korea	Malaysia	1–2	1–3	1973 President's Cup	

== Honours ==
Myanmar

- 1970 Asian Games: 1970

Individual

- Asian Games top scorer: 1970
