= Than Soe =

Burmese footballer

Personal information
- Date of birth: 3 June 1952 (age 74)
- Position: Striker

Senior career*
Years	Team	Apps	(Gls)
- Municipals

International career
- Myanmar
- * Club domestic league appearances and goals

Than Soe (born 3 June 1952) is a Burmese former footballer. He competed in the men's tournament at the 1972 Summer Olympics.

== Career ==
=== Club career ===
Than Soe played for the Municipals at club level.

=== International career ===
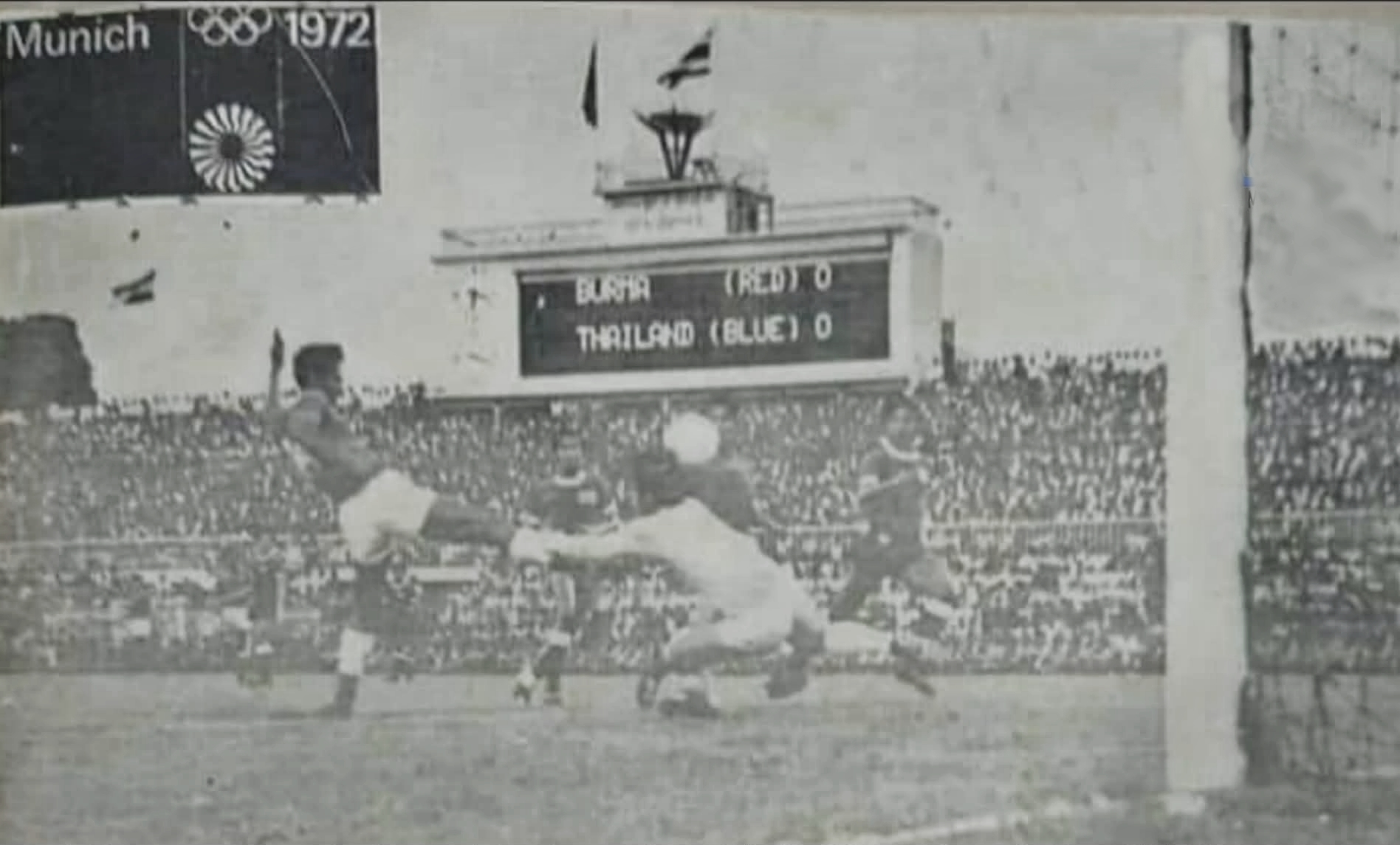
Than Soe scoring against Thailand in 1972.

Than Soe also represented the Burma national team in the 1970s.

== Career statistics ==
=== International goals ===
Scores and results list Burma's goal tally first, score column indicates score after each Than Soe goal.

List of international goals scored by Than Soe
No.	Date	Venue	Opponent	Score	Result	Competition	Ref.
1	17 December 1970	Bangkok, Thailand	South Korea	1–0	1–0	1970 Asian Games	
2	8 May 1971	Dongdaemun Stadium, Seoul, South Korea	Indonesia		3–1	1971 President's Cup	
3	11 June 1971	Senayan Stadium, Jakarta, Indonesia	Malaysia		5–1	1971 Jakarta Anniversary Tournament	
4	10 August 1971	Merdeka Stadium, Kuala Lumpur, Malaysia	Philippines		2–0	1971 Merdeka Tournament	
5	10 August 1971	Merdeka Stadium, Kuala Lumpur, Malaysia	Philippines		2–0	1971 Merdeka Tournament	
6	11 August 1971	Merdeka Stadium, Kuala Lumpur, Malaysia	Hong Kong		4–0	1971 Merdeka Tournament	
7	21 March 1972	Aung San Stadium, Rangoon, Myanmar	India		4–3	1972 Summer Olympics qualification	
8	21 March 1972	Aung San Stadium, Rangoon, Myanmar	India		4–3	1972 Summer Olympics qualification	
9	24 March 1972	Aung San Stadium, Rangoon, Myanmar	Ceylon		5–1	1972 Summer Olympics qualification	
10	24 March 1972	Aung San Stadium, Rangoon, Myanmar	Ceylon		5–1	1972 Summer Olympics qualification	
11	4 April 1972	Aung San Stadium, Rangoon, Myanmar	Thailand			1972 Summer Olympics qualification	
12	30 July 1973	Merdeka Stadium, Kuala Lumpur, Malaysia	Singapore		1–0	1973 Merdeka Tournament	
13	5 August 1973	Merdeka Stadium, Kuala Lumpur, Malaysia	Kuwait		2–0	1973 Merdeka Tournament	
14	8 August 1973	Merdeka Stadium, Kuala Lumpur, Malaysia	Bangladesh		6–0	1973 Merdeka Tournament	
15	8 August 1973	Merdeka Stadium, Kuala Lumpur, Malaysia	Bangladesh		6–0	1973 Merdeka Tournament	
16	2 September 1973	National Stadium, Singapore	Laos		8–0	1973 SEAP Games	
17	2 September 1973	National Stadium, Singapore	Laos		8–0	1973 SEAP Games	
18	7 September 1974	Aryamehr Stadium, Tehran, Iran	Pakistan		5–1	1974 Asian Games	
19	7 September 1974	Aryamehr Stadium, Tehran, Iran	Pakistan		5–1	1974 Asian Games	
20	1 August 1975	Merdeka Stadium, Kuala Lumpur, Malaysia	Bangladesh		7–1	1975 Merdeka Tournament	
21	1 August 1975	Merdeka Stadium, Kuala Lumpur, Malaysia	Bangladesh		7–1	1975 Merdeka Tournament	
22	1 August 1975	Merdeka Stadium, Kuala Lumpur, Malaysia	Bangladesh		7–1	1975 Merdeka Tournament	
23	5 August 1975	Merdeka Stadium, Kuala Lumpur, Malaysia	South Korea		2–3	1975 Merdeka Tournament	
24	11 August 1975	Merdeka Stadium, Kuala Lumpur, Malaysia	Indonesia		2–0	1975 Merdeka Tournament	
