= Football at the 1967 SEAP Games =

Football at the 1967 Southeast Asian Peninsular Games
- Venue: 1 (in 1 host city)
- Dates: 10 December - 16 December 1967
- Nations: 5

Football was contested as part of the programme for the 1967 Southeast Asian Peninsular Games which was hosted in Bangkok, Thailand from 9 to 16 December 1967. It was the fourth edition of the men's football tournament at the multi-sport event organised by the SEAP Games Federation Committee.

The football tournament began with the first matches of the group stage on 10 December 1967 and ended with the gold medal match on 16 December 1967. Defending champions Burma and South Vietnam contested the final. Burma defeated South Vietnam 2–1 to win the gold medal. In the bronze medal match, Thailand defeated Laos 5–2.

== Background ==
Football had been part of the Southeast Asian Peninsular Games programme following the debut of the men's competition at the inaugural 1959 SEAP Games in Thailand. Burma and Thailand were jointly defending champions after sharing the gold medal at the previous edition. Burma, Malaysia, South Vietnam and Thailand were jointly the most successful teams having each won the gold medal once.

== Format ==
In total, five teams took part in the competition. They were drawn into two single round robin groups – one of two teams and one of three teams. The winners and runners-up would then contest the semi-finals which would decide the teams contesting the gold and bronze medal matches.

=== Participants ===
- Burma
- Malaysia
- Thailand
- South Vietnam
- Laos

== Venue ==
Matches were played at the National Stadium in Bangkok, Thailand.

Bangkok is located in Thailand	Bangkok
Bangkok is located in Thailand	National Stadium
Bangkok is located in Thailand	Capacity: 20,000

== Group stage ==
=== Group A ===
Burma and Thailand advanced to the semi-finals.

==== Table ====
Pos	Team	Pld	W	D	L	GF	GA	GD	Pts	Qualification
1	Burma	2	2	0	0	3	1	+2	4	Advance to Knockout stage
2	Thailand	2	1	0	1	4	1	+3	2	Advance to Knockout stage
3	Malaysia	2	0	0	2	1	6	−5	0	

==== Matches ====
10 December

Thailand	4–0	Malaysia

National Stadium, Bangkok

11 December

Burma	2–1	Malaysia

National Stadium, Bangkok

12 December

Thailand	0–1	Burma

National Stadium, Bangkok

=== Group B ===
South Vietnam and Laos advanced to the semi-finals.

==== Table ====
Pos	Team	Pld	W	D	L	GF	GA	GD	Pts	Qualification
1	South Vietnam	1	1	0	0	5	0	+5	2	Advance to Knockout stage
2	Laos	1	0	0	1	0	5	−5	0	Advance to Knockout stage

==== Match ====
11 December

Laos	0–5	South Vietnam

National Stadium, Bangkok

== Semi-finals ==
Burma and South Vietnam advanced to the gold medal match.

14 December

Burma	2–0	Laos

National Stadium, Bangkok

14 December

South Vietnam	5–0	Thailand

National Stadium, Bangkok

== Bronze medal match ==
Thailand defeated Laos to win the bronze medal.

15 December

Thailand	5–2	Laos

National Stadium, Bangkok

== Gold medal match ==
Burma defeated South Vietnam to win the gold medal.

16 December

Burma	2–1	South Vietnam
Kyaw Thaung 25' (pen.); Hla Kyi 85'		Nguyễn Văn Ngôn 49'

National Stadium, Bangkok
