= Football at the 1969 SEAP Games =

Football at the 1969 Southeast Asian Peninsular Games
- Venue: 1 (in 1 host city)
- Dates: 6 December - 13 December 1969
- Nations: 5

Football was contested as part of the programme for the 1969 Southeast Asian Peninsular Games which was hosted in Rangoon, Burma from 6 to 13 December 1969. It was the fifth edition of the men's football tournament at the multi-sport event organised by the SEAP Games Federation Committee.

The football tournament began with the first matches of the group stage on 6 December 1969 and ended with the gold medal match on 13 December 1969. Hosts and two-time defending champions Burma and Thailand contested the final. Burma defeated Thailand 3–0 to win the gold medal.

== Background ==
Football had been part of the Southeast Asian Peninsular Games programme following the debut of the men's competition at the inaugural 1959 SEAP Games in Thailand. Burma were two-time defending champions after defeating South Vietnam 2–1 in the gold medal match. Burma were also the most successful team having won the gold medal twice previously.

== Format ==
In total, five teams took part in the competition. They were drawn into two single round robin groups – one of two teams and one of three teams. The winners and runners-up would then contest the semi-finals which would decide the teams contesting the gold medal match.

=== Participants ===
- Burma
- Malaysia
- Thailand
- South Vietnam
- Laos

== Venue ==
Matches were played at the Aung San Memorial Stadium in Rangoon, Burma.

Rangoon is located in Myanmar	Rangoon
Rangoon is located in Myanmar	Aung San Memorial Stadium
Rangoon is located in Myanmar	Capacity: 40,000

== Group stage ==
=== Group A ===
Burma and Thailand advanced to the semi-finals. After the teams drew 1–1, Burma won the group on a coin toss.

==== Table ====
Pos	Team	Pld	W	D	L	GF	GA	GD	Pts	Qualification
1	Burma	1	0	1	0	1	1	0	1	Advance to Knockout stage
2	Thailand	1	0	1	0	1	1	0	1	Advance to Knockout stage

==== Match ====
8 December 1969

Burma	1–1	Thailand

Aung San Memorial Stadium, Rangoon
Attendance: 33,619

=== Group B ===
Malaysia and Laos advanced to the semi-finals. After Laos and South Vietnam had identical results in their two matches, Laos finished second in the group on a coin toss.

==== Table ====
Pos	Team	Pld	W	D	L	GF	GA	GD	Pts	Qualification
1	Malaysia	2	2	0	0	4	2	+2	4	Advance to Knockout stage
2	Laos	2	0	1	1	1	2	−1	1	Advance to Knockout stage
3	South Vietnam	2	0	1	1	1	2	−1	1	

==== Matches ====
6 December 1969

Malaysia	2–1	Laos
Abdullah 65'; Nadarajah 70'		Phengsavanh 85'

Aung San Memorial Stadium, Rangoon
Attendance: 29,316
Referee: Khin My Aye (Burma)

7 December 1969

Malaysia	2–1	South Vietnam

Aung San Memorial Stadium, Rangoon
Attendance: 25,656

9 December 1969

Laos	0–0	South Vietnam

Aung San Memorial Stadium, Rangoon
Attendance: 13,453

== Semi-finals ==
Thailand and Burma advanced to the gold medal match.

10 December 1969

Malaysia	0–3	Thailand

Aung San Memorial Stadium, Rangoon
Attendance: 29,352

11 December 1969

Burma	4–0	Laos

Aung San Memorial Stadium, Rangoon
Attendance: 32,376

== Gold medal match ==
Burma defeated Thailand to win the gold medal.

13 December 1969

Burma	3–0	Thailand

Aung San Memorial Stadium, Rangoon
Attendance: 35,639
