= Khin Maung Lay (footballer) =

Burmese footballer

Personal information
- Date of birth: 21 September 1940 (age 86)

Senior career*
Years	Team	Apps	(Gls)
- Burma Navy

International career
- Myanmar
- * Club domestic league appearances and goals

Khin Maung Lay (born 21 September 1940) is a Burmese footballer. He competed in the men's tournament at the 1972 Summer Olympics.
