= Quah Kim Song =

Singaporean footballer

- Born: February 1952 (age 74); Singapore
- Spouses: Shirley Wang (died 2007); Sylvia Lim (m. 2025)
Association football career
- Position: Forward
Senior career*
Years	Team	Apps	(Gls)
- Tampines Rovers
- Burnley United
International career
1969–1979	Singapore	153	(53)
- * Club domestic league appearances and goals

Quah Kim Song (Chinese: 柯金松; pinyin: Kē Jīnsōng, born February 1952) is a former Singapore international footballer who played as a striker.

== Education ==
Quah received his secondary education at Naval Base Secondary School and pre-university education at Raffles Institution.

== Career ==
Quah's swift agility earned him the nicknames "Mercurial", "Quicksilver" and "Speed Demon" by fans and media. Among his most memorable matches was the 1977 Malaysia Cup Final at Merdeka Stadium in Kuala Lumpur, Malaysia, where he scored two goals in a 3–2 win for Singapore against Penang.

Quah is the FAS-S.League's Director of Competitions. He was also part of the Singapore national football team, and has played for Burnley United and Tampines Rovers.

== Personal life ==
Quah has 10 siblings. Quah and four of his brothers Kim Beng, Kim Siak, Kim Lye and Kim Swee played for Singapore, while another brother Kim Tiong was a triple jumper.

Quah was married to Shirley Wang, a bank manager at OCBC Bank. She was a member of the Honeydrops, a music group that participated in Talentime, a talent competition organised by Radio Television Singapore. They had two children. Wang died of cancer in 2007.

Since 2013, Quah has been the long-time partner of Workers' Party politician Sylvia Lim. They married in January 2025.

== Honours ==
=== International ===
Singapore

- Malaysia Cup: 1977

== Filmography ==
=== Television dramas ===
Year	Network	Title	Notes
2014	MediaCorp Channel 8	World at Your Feet	Prize presenter for the 2012 Dragon King Cup; Special appearance in episode 1
