= Aye Maung Gyi =

Burmese footballer

Personal information
- Full name: U Aye Maung Gyi
- Date of birth: 20 August 1950 (age 76)
- Position: Midfielder

Senior career*
Years	Team	Apps	(Gls)
- Construction Corporation

International career
- Myanmar
- * Club domestic league appearances and goals

U Aye Maung Gyi (born 20 August 1950) is a Burmese footballer. He competed in the men's tournament at the 1972 Summer Olympics.
