= Tin Sein (footballer) =

Burmese footballer

Personal information
- Date of birth: 12 June 1951 (age 75)
- Position: Defender

Senior career*
Years	Team	Apps	(Gls)
- Burma Army

International career
- Myanmar
- * Club domestic league appearances and goals

Tin Sein (born 12 June 1951) is a Burmese footballer. He competed in the men's tournament at the 1972 Summer Olympics.
