= Aye Maung Lay =

Burmese footballer

Personal information
- Full name: U Aye Maung Lay
- Date of birth: 10 June 1954 (age 72)

Senior career*
Years	Team	Apps	(Gls)
- Burma Air Force

International career
- Myanmar
- * Club domestic league appearances and goals

U Aye Maung Lay (born 10 June 1954) is a Burmese footballer. He competed in the men's tournament at the 1972 Summer Olympics.
