= Tin Aung Moe =

Burmese footballer

Personal information
- Date of birth: 12 June 1949 (age 77)

Senior career*
Years	Team	Apps	(Gls)
- Construction Corporation

International career
- Myanmar
- * Club domestic league appearances and goals

Tin Aung Moe (born 12 June 1949) is a Burmese former footballer. He competed in the men's tournament at the 1972 Summer Olympics.
