= Myo Win Nyunt =

Burmese footballer

Personal information
- Date of birth: 19 February 1950 (age 76)

Senior career*
| Years | Team | Apps | (Gls) |
- Customs

International career
- Myanmar
- * Club domestic league appearances and goals

Myo Win Nyunt (born 19 February 1950) is a Burmese footballer. He competed in the men's tournament at the 1972 Summer Olympics.
