= Maung Maung Tin (footballer) =

Burmese footballer

Personal information
- Date of birth: 21 May 1949 (age 77)

Senior career*
Years	Team	Apps	(Gls)
- Posts and Telecoms

International career
- Myanmar
- * Club domestic league appearances and goals

Maung Maung Tin (born 21 May 1949) is a Burmese footballer. He competed in the men's tournament at the 1972 Summer Olympics.
