= South Vietnam national football team =

Men's senior national football team of South Vietnam

State of Vietnam Republic of Vietnam
1949–1975
- Nickname(s): Rồng vàng (Golden Dragon)
- Association: Vietnam Football Association
- Confederation: AFC (Asia)
- Head coach: Nguyễn Thành Sự (last)
- Top scorer: Lê Hữu Đức (9)
- Home stadium: Cộng Hòa Stadium
- FIFA code: VSO
First colours	Second colours

First international
- Vietnam (Note: FIFA recognizes the results of the South Vietnamese team (State of Vietnam and Republic of Vietnam) existing from 1949 to 1975 as part of the results of Vietnam as a whole because unified Vietnam inherited South Vietnam's membership in FIFA. Before the country was divided, South Vietnamese team was the only team representing Vietnam) 3–3 South Korea (Saigon, French Cochinchina; 16 January 1949)

Last international
- Malaysia 3–0 South Vietnam (Bangkok, Thailand; 23 March 1975)

Biggest win
- South Vietnam 10–0 Philippines (Tokyo, Japan; 1 October 1967)

Biggest defeat
- South Vietnam 1–9 Indonesia (Seoul, South Korea; 4 May 1971)

AFC Asian Cup
- Appearances: 2 (first in 1956)
- Best result: Fourth place, (1956, 1960)

The Republic of Vietnam national football team (Vietnamese: Đội tuyển bóng đá quốc gia Việt Nam Cộng hòa) or the State of Vietnam national football team (Vietnamese: Đội tuyển bóng đá Quốc gia Việt Nam) was the national football team from 1949 to 1975 representing the State of Vietnam and later the Republic of Vietnam, known as "South Vietnam".

The State of Vietnam joined the International Association Football Federation (FIFA) in 1952 and the Asian Football Confederation (AFC) in 1954 as the founding member. Following the country’s reunification under the North in 1975, Vietnam also inherited South Vietnam’s memberships in FIFA and the AFC. The South Vietnamese football association was treated by these bodies as the only legitimate Vietnamese association, as the State of Vietnam and later the Republic of Vietnam claimed sovereignty over all of Vietnam from 1949 to 1975. The team started to play under the State of Vietnam in January 1949. After the State of Vietnam gained complete independence from France in June 1954 and Vietnam was divided in July, it existed side by side with a separate North Vietnam team, which represented the communist-controlled northern portion of the country from 1956 to 1975. Unlike its southern counterpart, the North Vietnamese football association was never allowed to join FIFA or the AFC. South Vietnam took part in the first two Asian Cups finals (1956 and 1960), finishing last both times. Despite the fierce wars, it was one of strongest teams in Southeast Asia.

The South Vietnam team played their last games at 1976 AFC Asian Cup qualification in March 1975, and ceased to exist after the Fall of Saigon in April, when the Vietnam War ended. The North and South regions combined into the unified Vietnam in 1975, with the Vietnam national team replacing both the North and South teams. The unified republic was allowed to keep South Vietnam's membership of FIFA and the AFC, resulting in the South Vietnam team's historical record usually being counted as part of the overall record of the Vietnam national team, while results for the North Vietnam team are not commonly included as part of the record.

== Tournament record ==
=== FIFA World Cup ===
FIFA World Cup record									Qualification record					
Year	Result	Pos.	Pld	W	D	L	GF	GA	Pld	W	D	L	GF	GA
(Brazil) 1950	Not a FIFA member								Not a FIFA member					
(Switzerland) 1954	Entry not accepted by FIFA								Entry not accepted by FIFA					
1958 to 1970	Did not enter								Did not enter					
(West Germany) 1974	Did not qualify								3	1	0	2	1	5
Total	—	—	–	–	–	–	–	–	3	1	0	2	1	5

==== 1974 FIFA World Cup qualification ====
The only World Cup qualification campaign which South Vietnam entered was the for the 1974 World Cup. They were placed in Zone A of the AFC and OFC qualification in Seoul, South Korea. On 16 May 1973 they beat Thailand 1–0 to qualify for Group 1. On 20 May, South Vietnam lost their opening game 0–4 to Japan and four days later they lost 1–0 to Hong Kong and were eliminated. Hong Kong and Japan advanced but neither got any further, losing play-offs for the next round to South Korea and Israel respectively.

Pos	Team	Pld	W	D	L	GF	GA	GD	Pts	Qualification	Hong Kong 1959	Japan	South Vietnam
1	Hong Kong	2	2	0	0	2	0	+2	4	Advance to Zone A semi-finals	—	1–0	1–0
2	Japan	2	1	0	1	4	1	+3	2	Advance to Zone A semi-finals	—	—	4–0
3	South Vietnam	2	0	0	2	0	5	−5	0		—	—	—

Rules for classification: Tiebreakers

=== Asian Cup ===
AFC Asian Cup record										Qualification record					
Year	Result	Pos.	Pld	W	D	L	GF	GA	Squad	Pld	W	D	L	GF	GA
(Hong Kong) 1956	Fourth place	4th	3	0	1	2	6	9	Squad	2	1	1	0	7	3
(South Korea) 1960	Fourth place	4th	3	0	0	3	2	12	Squad	2	2	0	0	5	1
(Israel) 1964	Did not qualify									3	2	0	1	9	7
(Iran) 1968	Did not qualify									4	2	0	2	4	4
(Thailand) 1972	Withdrew									Withdrew					
(Iran) 1976	Did not qualify									4	0	0	4	1	10
Total	Fourth place	4th	6	0	1	5	8	21	–	15	7	1	7	26	25

Asian Cup Finals Results
Year	Score	Result
1956	South Vietnam 2–2 Hong Kong	Draw
1956	South Vietnam 1–2 Israel	Loss
1956	South Vietnam 3–5 South Korea	Loss
1960	South Vietnam 1–5 South Korea	Loss
1960	South Vietnam 0–2 Taiwan	Loss
1960	South Vietnam 1–5 Israel	Loss

AFC Asian Cup record
First match	South Vietnam 2–2 Hong Kong (9 September 1956; Causeway Bay, Hong Kong)
Last match	South Vietnam 1–5 Israel (14 October 1960; Seoul, South Korea)
Biggest win	None
Biggest defeat	South Vietnam 1–5 Israel (14 October 1960; Seoul, South Korea); South Korea 5–1 South Vietnam (19 October 1960; Seoul, South Korea)
Best result	Fourth place in 1956 and 1960
Worst result	None

=== Olympic Games ===
Olympic Games record									Qualification record					
Year	Result	Pos.	Pld	W	D	L	GF	GA	Pld	W	D	L	GF	GA
(Finland) 1952	Did not enter								No qualification					
(Australia) 1956	Qualified, but withdrew								2	2	0	0	9	5
(Italy) 1960	Did not enter								Did not enter					
(Japan) 1964	Did not qualify								4	1	1	2	4	6
(Mexico) 1968	Did not qualify								5	2	1	2	14	5
(West Germany) 1972	Did not enter								Did not enter					
Total	0/16	–	–	–	–	–	–	–	11	5	2	4	27	16

=== Asian Games ===
Asian Games
Year	Round	GP	W	D	L	GF	GA
(India) 1951	Did not enter						
(Philippines) 1954	Preliminary round	2	1	0	1	5	5
(Japan) 1958	Quarter-finals	3	1	1	1	8	5
(Indonesia) 1962	Fourth place	5	2	0	3	12	8
(Thailand) 1966	Preliminary round	3	1	1	1	2	6
(Thailand) 1970	Preliminary round	2	0	0	2	0	3
(Iran) 1974	Did not enter						
Total	Fourth Place	15	5	2	8	27	27

Asian Games History
Year	Round	Score	Result
1954	Round 1	Vietnam 2–3 Taiwan	Loss
1954	Round 1	Vietnam 3–2 Philippines	Win
1958	Round 1	South Vietnam 1–1 Pakistan	Draw
1958	Round 1	South Vietnam 6–1 Malaya	Win
1958	Quarter-finals	South Vietnam 1–3 South Korea	Loss
1962	Round 1	South Vietnam 0–1 Indonesia	Loss
1962	Round 1	South Vietnam 6–0 Philippines	Win
1962	Round 1	South Vietnam 3–0 Malaya	Win
1962	Semi-finals	South Vietnam 2–3 India	Loss
1962	Bronze medal	South Vietnam 1–4 Malaya	Loss
1966	Round 1	South Vietnam 2–1 Taiwan	Win
1966	Round 1	South Vietnam 0–0 Indonesia	Draw
1966	Round 1	South Vietnam 0–5 Singapore	Loss
1970	Round 1	South Vietnam 0–2 India	Loss
1970	Round 1	South Vietnam 0–1 Thailand	Loss

=== Southeast Asian Games ===
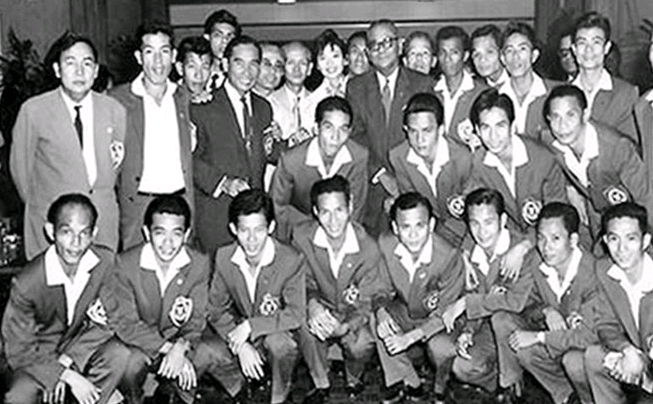
The South Vietnam team winning gold at the 1959 Southeast Asian Peninsular Games in Bangkok, Thailand

Southeast Asian Games record
Year	Result	Pld	W	D	L	GF	GA
(Thailand) 1959	Champions	4	3	0	1	11	3
(Myanmar) 1961	Third place	3	1	1	1	8	2
(Malaysia) 1965	Third place	4	2	0	2	8	5
(Thailand) 1967	Runners-up	3	2	0	1	11	2
(Myanmar) 1969	Group stage	2	0	1	1	1	2
(Malaysia) 1971	Third place	4	1	2	1	5	4
(Singapore) 1973	Runners-up	4	1	1	2	9	7
Total	1 title	24	10	5	9	53	25

- (Singapore) 1971: Pesta Sukan Cup (join-winners with India)

== Head-to-head record ==
Key

Positive balance
Neutral balance
Negative balance

The list shown below shows the South Vietnam national football team all-time international record against opposing nations.

Against	Played	Won	Drawn	Lost	GF	GA	GD
Australia	2	0	0	2	0	2	–2
Bangladesh	1	0	1	0	1	1	0
Burma	14	2	2	10	12	25	–12
Hong Kong	10	4	2	4	16	12	4
India	11	2	2	7	8	17	–9
Indonesia	15	5	1	9	25	36	–11
Israel	4	1	0	3	4	8	–4
Japan	9	4	0	5	13	15	–2
Khmer Republic	13	7	3	3	14	14	0
Kuwait	1	0	0	1	1	2	–1
Laos	6	5	1	0	24	1	23
Lebanon	1	0	1	0	1	1	0
Malaya	11	6	1	4	16	29	–1
Malaysia	20	4	6	10	30	42	–1
New Zealand	1	1	0	0	5	1	4
Pakistan	1	0	1	0	1	1	0
Philippines	4	4	0	0	25	2	23
Singapore	19	13	5	1	48	26	22
South Korea	18	1	6	11	18	44	–26
Taiwan	10	3	3	4	18	15	3
Thailand	28	20	3	5	59	27	32

== Managerial history ==
- (South Vietnam) Trương Văn Ký (1954)
- (South Vietnam) Nguyễn Văn Bông (1956)
- (South Vietnam) Lý Đức (1956)
- (South Vietnam) Lê Hữu Đức (1960)
- (South Vietnam) Lê Hữu Đức (1963–1964)
- (West Germany) Karl-Heinz Weigang (1966–1968)
- (South Vietnam) Nguyễn Ngọc Thanh (1969–1970)
- (South Vietnam) Nguyễn Thành Sự (1971)
- (South Vietnam) Trần Văn Thông (1971)
- (South Vietnam) Từ Bá Nhẫn (1973–1974)
- (South Vietnam) Nguyễn Thành Sự (1974–1975)

== Honours ==
=== Continental ===
- AFC Asian Cup
  - Fourth place (2): 1956, 1960
- Asian Games
  - Fourth place (1): 1962

=== Regional ===
- Southeast Asian Games
  - Gold medal (1): 1959
  - Silver medal (4): 1967, 1973
  - Bronze medal (4): 1961, 1965, 1971

=== Friendly ===
- South Vietnam Independence Cup
  - Champions (6): 1961, 1962, 1965, 1966, 1970, 1974
  - Runners-up (2): 1971, 1972
- Merdeka Tournament
  - Champions (1): 1966
- King's Cup
  - Third place (2): 1969, 1971
- Pesta Sukan Cup
  - Champions (1): 1971
- Thai Army Cup
  - Champions (1): 1974

== See also ==
- South Vietnam national under-20 football team
- Football in Vietnam
