= Football at the 1974 Asian Games – Men's team squads =

Squads for the Football at the 1974 Asian Games played in Tehran, Iran.

== Group A ==
=== South Korea ===
Head coach: (South Korea) Choi Yung-keun

No.	Pos.	Player	Date of birth (age)	Caps	Goals	Club
1	GK	Byun Ho-young	19 October 1945 (aged 28)			(Korea Football Association) Seoul Bank FC
2	DF	Park Kyung-bok	16 March 1952 (aged 22)			(Korea Football Association) ROK Army FC
3	DF	Kim Ho-gon	26 March 1950 (aged 24)			(Korea Football Association) Yonsei University
5	DF	Choi Jae-mo	10 July 1946 (aged 28)			(Korea Football Association) POSCO FC
6	DF	Yoo Ki-heung	11 October 1947 (aged 26)			(Korea Football Association) Commercial Bank of Korea FC
7	MF	Ko Jae-wook	9 April 1951 (aged 23)			(Korea Football Association) Kookmin Bank FC
8	MF	Kim Jin-kook	14 September 1951 (aged 22)			(Korea Football Association) Industrial Bank of Korea FC
9	FW	Cha Bum-kun	22 May 1953 (aged 21)			(Korea Football Association) Korea University
10	FW	Park Lee-chun	26 July 1947 (aged 27)			(Korea Football Association) Kookmin Bank FC
11	FW	Lee Hoe-taik	11 October 1946 (aged 27)			(Korea Football Association) POSCO FC
12	MF	Yoo Keon-soo	20 July 1952 (aged 22)			(Korea Football Association) Hanyang University
13	MF	Park Byung-chul	25 November 1954 (aged 19)			(Korea Football Association) Hanyang University
14	DF	Kang Byung-chan	15 April 1951 (aged 23)			(Korea Football Association) Commercial Bank of Korea FC
15	DF	Kim Hee-tae	10 July 1953 (aged 21)			(Korea Football Association) Yonsei University
16	MF	Hwang Jae-man	24 January 1953 (aged 21)			(Korea Football Association) Korea University
17	FW	Kim Jae-han	1 April 1947 (aged 27)			(Korea Football Association) Korea Housing Bank FC
18	DF	Kang Ki-wook	16 January 1950 (aged 24)			(Korea Football Association) ROK Army FC
19	MF	Cho Dong-hyun	21 March 1951 (aged 23)			(Korea Football Association) Kyung Hee University
20	DF	Park Young-tae	12 November 1948 (aged 25)			(Korea Football Association) ROK Marine Corps FC
21	GK	Kwon Yi-woon	26 December 1950 (aged 23)			(Korea Football Association) Korea Trust Bank FC

=== Kuwait ===
No.	Pos.	Player	Date of birth (age)	Caps	Goals	Club
	GK	Ahmed Al-Tarabulsi	22 March 1947 (aged 27)			
	GK	Mohammed Abdulhameed				
	DF	Hussein Mohammad				
	DF	Abdullah Nadar				
	DF	Abdullah Essa				
	DF	Ibrahim Duraihem				
	DF	Marzouq Saeed				
	DF	Hussein Al-Assousi				
	DF	Hussein Al-Jaser				
	MF	Farouq Ibrahim				
	MF	Saad Al-Houti				(Kuwait Football Association)
	MF	Hamad Bouhamad				(Kuwait Football Association)
	MF	Saud Bouhamad				(Kuwait Football Association)
	MF	Saleh Al-Asfoor				(Kuwait Football Association)
	FW	Fathi Kameel				
	FW	Jasem Yaqoub	25 October 1953 (aged 20)			
	FW	Faisal Al-Dakheel				
	FW	ِAli Al-Mulla				
	FW	Abdulaziz Al-Anberi				
	FW	Hussein Al-Jutaili				

=== Thailand ===
Head coach: (Thailand) Seraniw Chinwala

== Group B ==
=== China ===
Head coach: (China) Ren Bin

No.	Pos.	Player	Date of birth (age)	Caps	Goals	Club
	GK	Li Songhai	January 1941 (aged 35)			
	GK	Zhang Yefu				
	DF	Xu Genbao	26 January 1944 (aged 30)			(Chinese Football Association) Bayi
	DF	Qi Wusheng	20 May 1944 (aged 30)			(Chinese Football Association) Liaoning
	DF	Wang Hangqin				
	DF	Xiang Hengqing	15 July 1947 (aged 27)			(Chinese Football Association) Shandong
	DF	Gu Mingchang				
	DF	Li Yingfa	13 November 1944 (aged 29)			(Chinese Football Association) Liaoning
	MF	Chi Shangbin	10 September 1949 (aged 24)			(Chinese Football Association) Liaoning
	MF	Li Guoning (captain)	1942 (aged 32–33)			(Chinese Football Association) Fujian
	MF	Liu Qingquan				
	MF	Lin Xinjiang				
	MF	Yang Limin				
	FW	Li Zhouzhe	January 1944 (aged 30)			(Chinese Football Association) PLA Air force
	FW	Wang Jilian	15 February 1946 (aged 28)			(Chinese Football Association) Liaoning
	FW	Rong Zhixing	30 July 1948 (aged 26)			(Chinese Football Association) Guangdong
	FW	Wang Houjun	16 September 1943 (aged 30)			(Chinese Football Association) Shanghai
	FW	Wang Xiao He	1952 (aged 21–22)			(Chinese Football Association) Bayi
	FW	Ni Jide				
	FW	Xu Guoqiang				

=== India ===
Head coach: (India) P. K. Banerjee

No.	Pos.	Player	Date of birth (age)	Caps	Goals	Club
	GK	E.N. Sudhir				(All India Football Federation) Maharashtra
	GK	Prasanta Mitra				(All India Football Federation) Bengal
	DF	Nicholas Pereira				(All India Football Federation) Goa
	DF	Shyamal Ghosh				(All India Football Federation) East Bengal
	DF	Kajal Dhali				(All India Football Federation) East Bengal
	DF	Prabir Majumdar				(All India Football Federation) Bengal
	DF	Pradeep Chowdhury				(All India Football Federation) Maharashtra
	DF	Gurdev Singh Gill	20 April 1950 (aged 24)			(All India Football Federation) Punjab Police
	DF	Dilip Palit				(All India Football Federation) Railways
	MF	Shyam Sunder Manna				(All India Football Federation) Bengal
	MF	Doraiswami Nataraj				(All India Football Federation) Mysore
	MF	Gautam Sarkar	8 January 1950 (aged 24)			(All India Football Federation) Bengal
	MF	Prasun Banerjee	6 April 1955 (aged 19)			(All India Football Federation) Bengal
	FW	Surajit Sengupta	30 August 1951 (aged 23)			(All India Football Federation) East Bengal
	FW	Subhash Bhowmick	2 October 1950 (aged 23)			(All India Football Federation) East Bengal
	FW	Mohammed Habib	17 July 1949 (aged 25)			(All India Football Federation) East Bengal
	FW	Shyam Thapa	1 May 1948 (aged 26)			(All India Football Federation) Maharashtra
	FW	Magan Singh Rajvi				(All India Football Federation) RAC Bikaner

=== Iraq ===
Head coach: (Iraq) Thamir Muhsin

No.	Pos.	Player	Date of birth (age)	Caps	Goals	Club
	GK	Jalal Abdul-Rahman	6 May 1946 (aged 28)			(Iraq Football Association) Al-Zawraa
	GK	Fadhel Abbas	3 June 1951 (aged 23)			
	DF	Hassan Farhan	29 June 1953 (aged 21)			(Iraq) Al-Jaish
	DF	Sabih Abid Ali				
	DF	Kadhim Kamil	1 July 1951 (aged 23)			(Iraq) Al-Tayaran
	DF	Sahib Khazal	1 January 1943 (aged 31)			(Iraq) Al-Tayaran
	DF	Douglas Aziz	1 January 1942 (aged 32)			(Iraq) Al-Shorta
	MF	Riyadh Nouri	1 July 1951 (aged 23)			(Iraq) Al-Shorta
	FW	Falah Hassan	1 July 1951 (aged 23)			(Iraq) Al-Tayaran
	MF	Hazem Jassam	1 July 1949 (aged 25)			(Iraq) Al-Zawraa
	FW	Jalil Hanoon	1 July 1952 (aged 22)			(Iraq) Al-Minaa
	FW	Ali Kadhim	1 January 1949 (aged 25)			(Iraq) Al-Zawraa
	MF	Qaisar Hameed	1 July 1950 (aged 24)			
	DF	Rahim Karim	2 February 1952 (aged 22)			(Iraq) Al-Minaa
	FW	Salah Obeid				
	FW	Sabah Hatim	1 July 1950 (aged 24)			(Iraq) Al-Shorta
	MF	Saadi Younis	1 July 1953 (aged 21)			
	DF	Qusay Qasim	1 July 1947 (aged 27)			
	MF	Alaa Ahmad	1 July 1952 (aged 22)			(Iraq) Al-Minaa
	MF	Hesham Mustafa	1 July 1952 (aged 22)			(Iraq) Al-Tayaran

=== North Korea ===
No.	Pos.	Player	Date of birth (age)	Caps	Goals	Club
	GK					
	DF	An Gil-wan				
	DF	Kim Jong-min				
	MF	Myong Dong-chan				
	MF	Cha Jung-sok				
	FW	An Se-uk				
	FW	Yang Song-guk				
	FW	Mun Ki-nam				

== Group C ==
=== Israel ===
Head coach: (Israel) David Schweitzer

No.	Pos.	Player	Date of birth (age)	Caps	Goals	Club
	GK	Itzhak Vissoker				(Israel Football Association) Hapoel Petah Tikva
	MF	Meir Nimni				(Israel Football Association) Maccabi Tel Aviv
	DF	Zvi Rosen				(Israel Football Association) Maccabi Tel Aviv
	DF	Avraham Lev				(Israel Football Association) Beitar Tel Aviv
	DF	Yisha'ayahu Schwager				(Israel Football Association) Maccabi Haifa
	DF	Menahem Bello				(Israel Football Association) Maccabi Tel Aviv
	FW	Yehoshua Feigenbaum				(Israel Football Association) Hapoel Tel Aviv
	MF	Itzhak Shum				(Israel Football Association) Hapoel Kfar Saba
	MF	Moshe Schweitzer				(Israel Football Association) Hapoel Petah Tikva
	FW	Gidi Damti				(Israel Football Association) Shimshon Tel Aviv
	FW	Shalom Schwarz				
	FW	Moshe Onana				
		Eli Leventhal				
		Yoel Massuari				

=== Japan ===
Head coach: (Japan) Ken Naganuma

No.	Pos.	Player	Date of birth (age)	Caps	Goals	Club
	GK	Kenzo Yokoyama	21 January 1943 (aged 31)			(Japan Football Association) Mitsubishi Motors
	DF	Atsuyoshi Furuta	27 October 1952 (aged 21)			(Japan Football Association) Waseda University
	DF	Keizo Imai	19 November 1950 (aged 23)			(Japan Football Association) Fujita Industries
	DF	Kuniya Daini	12 October 1944 (aged 29)			(Japan Football Association) Mitsubishi Motors
	MF	Aritatsu Ogi	10 December 1942 (aged 31)			(Japan Football Association) Toyo Kogyo
	MF	Nobuo Kawakami	4 October 1947 (aged 26)			(Japan Football Association) Hitachi
	DF	Shigemi Ishii	7 July 1951 (aged 23)			(Japan Football Association) Chuo University
	MF	Daishiro Yoshimura	16 August 1947 (aged 27)			(Japan Football Association) Yanmar
	MF	Shusaku Hirasawa	5 March 1949 (aged 25)			(Japan Football Association) Hitachi
	FW	Toshio Takabayashi	15 November 1953 (aged 20)			(Japan Football Association) Chuo University
	FW	Kunishige Kamamoto	15 April 1944 (aged 30)			(Japan Football Association) Yanmar
	MF	Mitsuo Watanabe	5 June 1953 (aged 21)			(Japan Football Association) Fujita Industries
	MF	Nobuo Fujishima	8 April 1950 (aged 24)			(Japan Football Association) Nippon Kokan
	MF	Kozo Arai	24 October 1950 (aged 23)			(Japan Football Association) Furukawa Electric
	MF	Akira Nishino	7 April 1955 (aged 19)			(Japan Football Association) Waseda University
	GK	Tatsuhiko Seta	15 January 1953 (aged 21)			(Japan Football Association) Hitachi
	FW	Yoshikazu Nagai	6 April 1952 (aged 22)			(Japan Football Association) Furukawa Electric
	DF	Hiroshi Ochiai	28 February 1946 (aged 28)			(Japan Football Association) Mitsubishi Motors

=== Malaysia ===
Head coach: (Malaysia) Jalil Che Din

No.	Pos.	Player	Date of birth (age)	Caps	Goals	Club
1	GK	R. Arumugam				
3	DF	Soh Chin Aun				
5	DF	Santokh Singh				
4	DF	M. Chandran				
	DF	Namat Abdullah				
6	MF	Shukor Salleh				
	MF	Wan Zawawi				
	MF	Ali Bakar				
	MF	Shaharuddin Abdullah				
10	FW	Mokhtar Dahari				
	FW	Isa Bakar				
	GK	Wong Kam Fook				
	DF	Harun Jusoh				
	MF	Mohammed Bakar				
	MF	Wong Hee Kok				
	MF	Hanafiah Ali				
	FW	Syed Ahmad				
	FW	P. Umaparam				

=== Philippines ===
Head coach: (Philippines) Florentino Broce

No.	Pos.	Player	Date of birth (age)	Caps	Goals	Club
	DF	Arturo Vicente Maristela				
	DF	Alberto Honasan				
		Robbie Vicente				
		Iñaki Vicente				
	FW	Jose Genato				

== Group D ==
=== Bahrain ===
Head coach: (Scotland) Danny McLennan

No.	Pos.	Player	Date of birth (age)	Caps	Goals	Club
	GK	Farid Zubari				
	GK	Abdulrahim Jaber				
	DF	Ibrahim Bujairi	1948 (aged 26)			
	DF	Hamad Nabhan	1953 (aged 21)			
	DF	Nedhir Al-Derazi				
	DF	Juma Bashir				
	DF	Sultan Al-Moqahwi				
	DF	Yousif Mohammed Ali				
	DF	Saeed Al-Abbadi				
	MF	Salman Sharida	19 May 1952 (aged 22)			
	MF	Hassan Hussain				
	FW	Hassan Zuleikh	1954 (aged 20)			
	FW	Mohamed Al-Zayyani				
	FW	Fouad Bushager				
		Jawher Al-Mas				
		Ali Abbas				
		Khalil Showayer				

=== Burma ===
Head coach: (Myanmar) Sein Hlaing

No.	Pos.	Player	Date of birth (age)	Caps	Goals	Club
	GK	Maung Maung Nyunt				
	DF	Win Nyunt Myo				
	DF	Sein Tin				
	DF	Aye San				
	DF	Maung Maung Tin				
	MF	Maung Aye				
	MF	Mya Kyiang				
	MF	Nyunt Ye				
	MF	Nan Su				
	FW	Tin Wen				
	FW	Nei Nei Tun				
	FW	Maung Tin Aung				
	DF	Aashok				
	MF	Ryint Soe				
	MF	Maung Tun Khin				
	FW	Win Maung				
	FW	Than Soe				
	MF	Thin Aung Moe				
	FW	Maung Hla Htay				
	FW	Khin Maung Lay				

=== Iran ===
Head coach: (Republic of Ireland) Frank O'Farrell

No.	Pos.	Player	Date of birth (age)	Caps	Goals	Club
	GK	Mansour Rashidi				(Football Federation Islamic Republic of Iran) Taj
	GK	Nasser Hejazi				(Football Federation Islamic Republic of Iran) Taj
	DF	Ebrahim Ashtiani				(Football Federation Islamic Republic of Iran) Perspolis
	DF	Akbar Kargarjam				(Football Federation Islamic Republic of Iran) Taj
	DF	Ezzat Janmaleki				(Football Federation Islamic Republic of Iran) Taj
	DF	Masih Masihnia				(Football Federation Islamic Republic of Iran) Perspolis
	MF	Ali Jabbari				(Football Federation Islamic Republic of Iran) Taj
	MF	Karo Haghverdian				(Football Federation Islamic Republic of Iran) Taj
	MF	Ali Parvin				(Football Federation Islamic Republic of Iran) Perspolis
	MF	Mohammad Sadeghi				(Football Federation Islamic Republic of Iran) PAS
	FW	Gholam Hossein Mazloumi				(Football Federation Islamic Republic of Iran) Taj
	FW	Mohammad Reza Adelkhani				(Football Federation Islamic Republic of Iran) Taj
	FW	Ghafour Jahani				(Football Federation Islamic Republic of Iran) Malavan
	DF	Jafar Kashani				(Football Federation Islamic Republic of Iran) Perspolis
	MF	Parviz Ghelichkhani				(Football Federation Islamic Republic of Iran) Oghab
	FW	Hasan Rowshan				(Football Federation Islamic Republic of Iran) Taj
	GK	Bahram Mavaddat				(Football Federation Islamic Republic of Iran) Perspolis
	DF	Mohsen Houshangi				(Football Federation Islamic Republic of Iran) PAS
	DF	Mahmoud Etemadi				(Football Federation Islamic Republic of Iran) Bank Melli
	DF	Mohammad Dastjerdi				(Football Federation Islamic Republic of Iran) Perspolis

=== Pakistan ===
Head coach: (India) Mohammed Rahmatullah

No.	Pos.	Player	Date of birth (age)	Caps	Goals	Club
	GK	Afzal Hussain				(Pakistan Football Federation) Pakistan Airlines
	GK	Muhammad Iqbal				(Pakistan Football Federation) Karachi Division
	DF	Ali Muhammad				(Pakistan Football Federation) Pakistan Airlines
	DF	Wali Muhammad				(Pakistan Football Federation) Rawalpindi
	DF	Ghulam Akbar				(Pakistan Football Federation) Pakistan Airlines
	DF	Mujahid Tareen	11 August 1949 (aged 25)			(Pakistan Football Federation) Pakistan Army
	DF	Ashok Kumar				(Pakistan Football Federation) Khairpur
	DF	Amir Bakhsh				(Pakistan Football Federation) Karachi Division
	DF	Muhammad Arshad				(Pakistan Football Federation) Pakistan Railways
	DF	Muhammad Ishaq Changezi				(Pakistan Football Federation) Pakistan Railways
	MF	Ali Asghar	1950 (aged 24)			(Pakistan Football Federation) Lahore
	MF	Abdul Ghafoor	3 August 1938 (aged 36)			(Pakistan Football Federation) Karachi Division
	MF	Maula Bakhsh Momin				(Pakistan Football Federation)
	FW	Ghulam Sarwar	1953 (aged 21)			(Pakistan Football Federation) Pakistan Airlines
	FW	Abdul Ghafoor Ajiz				(Pakistan Football Federation) Peshawar Division
	FW	Muhammad Idrees				(Pakistan Football Federation) Pakistan Railways
	FW	Ali Nawaz Baloch	3 July 1949 (aged 25)			(Pakistan Football Federation) Pakistan Airlines
	FW	Afzal Qasim				(Pakistan Football Federation) Karachi Division
