= Anugerah Sukan Negara for Sportsman of the Year =

List of winners of the sporting award

List of winners and nominees of the Anugerah Sukan Negara: Sportsman of the Year.

== List of winners and nominees ==
| Year | Athlete | Sport | Refs |
|---|---|---|---|
| 1966 | Mani Jegathesan | Athletics | |
| 1966 | Tan Aik Huang | Badminton | |
| 1966 | Tan Cheek Chuan | Basketball | |
| 1966 | Terence Stahlman | Boxing | |
| 1966 | Mike Shepherdson | Cricket | |
| 1966 | Ng Joo Pong | Cycling | |
| 1966 | Ronnie Theseira | Fencing | |
| 1966 | Abdullah Noordin | Football | |
| 1966 | Darwis Deran | Golf | |
| 1966 | M. Doraisamy | Field hockey | |
| 1966 | Wong Foo Wah | Shooting | |
| 1966 | Cheah Tong Kim | Swimming | |
| 1966 | Lee Mun Chew | Table tennis | |
| 1966 | Ngiam Fook Tien | Volleyball | |
| 1966 | Leong Chim Seong | Weightlifting | |
| 1967 | Tan Aik Huang | Badminton | |
| 1967 | Nashatar Singh Sidhu | Athletics | |
| 1967 | Wee Cheong Phor | Basketball | |
| 1967 | Terence Stahlman | Boxing | |
| 1967 | Gurucharan Singh | Cricket | |
| 1967 | Choy Mow Thim | Cycling | |
| 1967 | Low Say Pun | Fencing | |
| 1967 | M. Chandran | Football | |
| 1967 | Zainal Abidin Yusof | Golf | |
| 1967 | Shee Tat Yan | Artistic gymnastics | |
| 1967 | M. Doraisamy | Field hockey | |
| 1967 | Anthony Chan | Judo | |
| 1967 | Billy Yap | Tennis | |
| 1967 | Wong Hin Jee | Rugby union | |
| 1967 | M. Kassim Bakar | Sepak takraw | |
| 1967 | Wong Foo Wah | Shooting | |
| 1967 | Fong Seow San | Swimming | |
| 1967 | Soong Poh Wah | Table tennis | |
| 1967 | Ngiam Fook Tien | Volleyball | |
| 1967 | Yap Meng Soon | Weightlifting | |
| 1968 | Ng Boon Bee | Badminton | |
| 1968 | Mani Jegathesan | Athletics | |
| 1968 | Tan Choon Soong | Basketball | |
| 1968 | Johnny Kim | Bowling | |
| 1968 | Boey Su Siong | Boxing | |
| 1968 | Alex Delilkan | Cricket | |
| 1968 | Ng Joo Pong | Cycling | |
| 1968 | M. Chandran | Football | |
| 1968 | Jalal Deran | Golf | |
| 1968 | Ho Koh Chye | Field hockey | |
| 1968 | S. A. Azman | Tennis | |
| 1968 | Tham Bing Kwan | Motorcycling | |
| 1968 | Chan Cheng Mun | Rugby union | |
| 1968 | Abdul Jalil Aziz | Sepak takraw | |
| 1968 | Chan Kok Leong | Shooting | |
| 1968 | Chan Chee Seng | Swimming | |
| 1968 | Ngiam Fook Tien | Volleyball | |
| 1968 | Eun Tin Loi | Weightlifting | |
| 1968 | Tham Kok Ching | Wrestling | |
| 1969 | Punch Gunalan | Badminton | |
| 1969 | Nashatar Singh Sidhu | Athletics | |
| 1969 | Lee Lek Heia | Basketball | |
| 1969 | Saloman Esmanto | Bodybuilding | |
| 1969 | Boey Su Siong | Boxing | |
| 1969 | Zainuddin Meah Hayati Meah | Cricket | |
| 1969 | Chong Kwong Fook | Fencing | |
| 1969 | Foo Fook Chuan | Football | |
| 1969 | Shee Tat Yan | Artistic gymnastics | |
| 1969 | Yang Siow Meng | Field hockey | |
| 1969 | Moses Tay | Tennis | |
| 1969 | Gee Boon Kee | Rugby union | |
| 1969 | Khalid Bakar | Sepak takraw | |
| 1969 | Wong Foo Wah | Shooting | |
| 1969 | Lim Cheik Sung | Swimming | |
| 1969 | Soong Poh Hwa | Table tennis | |
| 1969 | Wong Ko Yung | Volleyball | |
| 1969 | Chit Choon | Weightlifting | |
| 1969 | Gurucharan Singh | Wrestling | |
| 1970 | Ng Joo Ngan | Cycling | |
| 1970 | K. Thirumal | Athletics | |
| 1970 | Ng Boon Bee | Badminton | |
| 1970 | Lim Yew Chan | Basketball | |
| 1970 | Clancy Ang | Bodybuilding | |
| 1970 | Tobias Totu | Boxing | |
| 1970 | A. Christie | Cricket | |
| 1970 | Chan Pak Choon | Fencing | |
| 1970 | Shaharuddin Abdullah | Football | |
| 1970 | Sri Shanmuganathan | Field hockey | |
| 1970 | S. A. Azman | Tennis | |
| 1970 | Brian Pestana | Rugby union | |
| 1970 | Khalid Din | Sepak takraw | |
| 1970 | Yap Phow Thong | Shooting | |
| 1970 | Lu Khai Wen | Swimming | |
| 1970 | Soong Poh Wah | Table tennis | |
| 1970 | Wong Ko Yun | Volleyball | |
| 1970 | Sua Heng Boo | Weightlifting | |
| 1970 | Leong Thin Fook | Wrestling | |
| 1971 | Daud Ibrahim | Cycling | |
| 1972 | Murugesan Mahendran | Field hockey | |
| 1972 | Mak Chee Hoon | Fencing | |
| 1973 | Chiang Jin Choon | Swimming | |
| 1973 | Namat Abdullah | Football | |
| 1973 | Punch Gunalan | Badminton | |
| 1973 | Ally Ong Tai Hong | Shooting | |
| 1973 | Ishtiaq Mubarak | Athletics | |
| 1973 | Basri Kerana Jemadi | Bodybuilding | |
| 1973 | Mak Chee Hoon | Fencing | |
| 1973 | Zainuddin Meah Hayati Meah | Tennis | |
| 1973 | Ng Peng Kong | Rugby union | |
| 1973 | Ishak Yassin | Sepak takraw | |
| 1973 | Peong Tak Seng | Table tennis | |
| 1973 | Tan Choon Meng | Volleyball | |
| 1973 | Mohd Aziz Bachik | Weightlifting | |
| 1973 | Gan Boon Leong | Wrestling | |
| 1973 | Yew Ah Peng | Basketball | |
| 1974 | Punch Gunalan | Badminton | |
| 1974 | Ishtiaq Mubarak | Athletics | |
| 1974 | Mokhtar Yusuf | Cycling | |
| 1974 | Hamzah Hussein | Football | |
| 1974 | M. Subramaniam | Sepak takraw | |
| 1975 | Khoo Chong Beng | Athletics | |
| 1975 | James Selvaraj | Badminton | |
| 1975 | Peong Tak Seng | Table tennis | |
| 1975 | Foo Chai Hai | Basketball | |
| 1975 | Ishak Bluah | Golf | |
| 1975 | Sri Shanmuganathan | Field hockey | |
| 1975 | Mokhtar Yusof | Cycling | |
| 1975 | A. Arokiasamy | Bodybuilding | |
| 1975 | Santokh Singh | Football | |
| 1975 | Harban Singh | Weightlifting | |
| 1975 | Jonathan Davidson | Swimming | |
| 1975 | Chen Hua Kai | Volleyball | |
| 1975 | Alex Liew | Rugby union | |
| 1975 | Koay Sin Poh | Judo | |
| 1975 | P. S. Nathan | Bowling | |
| 1975 | Tan Poh Seng | Tennis | |
| 1975 | Toh Kek Kheong | Wrestling | |
| 1975 | Syed Azam | Boxing | |
| 1976 | Mokhtar Dahari | Football | |
| 1976 | Mat Ali Hassan | Cycling | |
| 1976 | Phua Ah Hua | Badminton | |
| 1976 | Ishtiaq Mubarak | Athletics | |
| 1977 | Shukor Salleh | Football | |
| 1978 | V. Subramaniam | Athletics | |
| 1979 | Khoo Boo Jin | Bowling | |
| 1979 | V. Subramaniam | Athletics | |
| 1979 | Saw Swee Leong | Badminton | |
| 1979 | Goh Cheng Huat | Basketball | |
| 1979 | Basri Kerana Jemadi | Bodybuilding | |
| 1979 | Moideen Said Ali | Boxing | |
| 1979 | R. Ratnalingam | Cricket | |
| 1979 | Mat Ali Hassan | Cycling | |
| 1979 | Ng Yau Siong | Fencing | |
| 1979 | Soh Chin Aun | Football | |
| 1979 | Ow Soon Kooi | Field hockey | |
| 1979 | Goh Wing Wai | Judo | |
| 1979 | Nik Hashim Nik Mohamed | Rugby union | |
| 1979 | Che Hassan Yob | Sepak takraw | |
| 1979 | Stanley Lim | Shooting | |
| 1979 | Oung Boon Chwee | Softball | |
| 1979 | Tony Tiah | Squash | |
| 1979 | Wong Siew Yong | Swimming | |
| 1979 | Peong Tak Seng | Table tennis | |
| 1979 | Lee Yoke Keong | Taekwondo | |
| 1979 | Suresh Menon | Tennis | |
| 1979 | Hii King | Volleyball | |
| 1979 | Samah Mohamed Ali | Weightlifting | |
| 1980 | Rabuan Pit | Athletics | |
| 1980 | Misbun Sidek | Badminton | |
| 1981 | Misbun Sidek | Badminton | |
| 1981 | V. Subramaniam | Athletics | |
| 1982 | Rabuan Pit | Athletics | |
| 1982 | Razif Sidek | Badminton | |
| 1982 | Wong Sze Meng | Basketball | |
| 1982 | Bujang Taha | Bodybuilding | |
| 1982 | Allan Lee | Bowling | |
| 1982 | Sarodi Othman | Boxing | |
| 1982 | P. Banerji | Cricket | |
| 1982 | Rosman Alwi | Cycling | |
| 1982 | Tan Soon Liang | Fencing | |
| 1982 | Foo Keat Seong | Field hockey | |
| 1982 | Lim Chee Jin | Karate | |
| 1982 | Boon Hoon Chee | Rugby union | |
| 1982 | Tang Wai Chee | Sailing | |
| 1982 | Adnan Saidin | Sepak takraw | |
| 1982 | Jerry Loo | Squash | |
| 1982 | Ahmad Mohamed Noor | Softball | |
| 1982 | Foo Yoke Heng | Swimming | |
| 1982 | Lee Kien Kee | Table tennis | |
| 1982 | Lee Yoke Keong | Taekwondo | |
| 1982 | Abdul Rahman Ramlal | Tennis | |
| 1982 | Jamaluddin Abu Bakar | Volleyball | |
| 1983 | Misbun Sidek | Badminton | |
| 1983 | Michael Chuah Seng Tatt | Bowling | |
| 1984 | Michael Chuah Seng Tatt | Bowling | |
| 1984 | B. Rajkumar | Athletics | |
| 1984 | Rosman Alwi | Cycling | |
| 1984 | Kevin Loh | Swimming | |
| 1985 | Rosman Alwi | Cycling | |
| 1985 | B. Rajkumar | Athletics | |
| 1986 | Abdul Malek Mohd Noor | Bodybuilding | |
| 1986 | Bingo Wang | Bowling | |
| 1987 | Murugayan Kumaresan | Cycling | |
| 1987 | Nordin Mohamed Jadi | Athletics | |
| 1987 | Abdul Malek Mohd Noor | Bodybuilding | |
| 1988 | Jeffrey Ong | Swimming | |
| 1988 | Johnny Chong | Karate | |
| 1989 | Foo Kok Keong | Badminton | |
| 1990 | Rashid Sidek | Badminton | |
| 1991 | Rashid Sidek | Badminton | |
| 1991 | W. R. Jamarulan Ramli | Archery | |
| 1991 | Nur Herman Majid | Athletics | |
| 1991 | Chin Chee Wai | Basketball | |
| 1991 | Jimmy Lee | Bowling | |
| 1991 | Ishak Raja Etam | Bodybuilding | |
| 1991 | Murugayan Kumaresan | Cycling | |
| 1991 | Ahmad Fadzil Zainal Abidin | Field hockey | |
| 1991 | Azizol Abu Haniffa | Football | |
| 1991 | Kau Jit Kaur | Artistic gymnastics | |
| 1991 | P. Arivalagan | Karate | |
| 1991 | Lokman Rejab | Rugby union | |
| 1991 | Rehan Mohamed Din | Sepak takraw | |
| 1991 | Kaw Fung Ying | Shooting | |
| 1991 | Jeffrey Ong | Swimming | |
| 1991 | Tay Choon Chai | Table tennis | |
| 1991 | R. Selvamuthu | Taekwondo | |
| 1991 | Adam Malik | Tennis | |
| 1991 | Teo Poh Chuan | Volleyball | |
| 1992 | Rashid Sidek | Badminton | |
| 1993 | Ramachandran Munusamy | Athletics | |
| 1993 | Noorharasid Karim | Archery | |
| 1993 | Rashid Sidek | Badminton | |
| 1993 | Sazali Samad | Bodybuilding | |
| 1993 | Lau Boon Hui | Basketball | |
| 1993 | Ng Yiew Hup | Bowling | |
| 1993 | Mashafizul Helmi | Chess | |
| 1993 | Murugayan Kumaresan | Cycling | |
| 1993 | Lim Teng Piao | Fencing | |
| 1993 | Radhi Mat Din | Football | |
| 1993 | Lim Chiow Chuan | Field hockey | |
| 1993 | Johnny Chong | Karate | |
| 1993 | Wan Adnan Wan Isa | Pencak silat | |
| 1993 | Mohamed Sarbin Daud | Rugby union | |
| 1993 | Hing Chai Hee | Shooting | |
| 1993 | Tan Tian Huat | Squash | |
| 1993 | Jeffrey Ong | Swimming | |
| 1993 | Yong Hong Cheh | Table tennis | |
| 1993 | R. Rajendran | Taekwondo | |
| 1993 | R. Ramachandran | Tennis | |
| 1993 | Soo Yoke Fong | Volleyball | |
| 1993 | Alexander Charles Yoong Loong | Water skiing | |
| 1993 | Choy Yeen Onn | Wushu | |
| 1994 | Nur Herman Majid | Athletics | |
| 1994 | Rashid Sidek | Badminton | |
| 1994 | Karamjit Singh | Rallying | |
| 1995 | Sam Chong Tin | Billiards and snooker | |
| 1995 | Loo Kum Zee | Athletics | |
| 1995 | Tsen Seong Hoong | Cycling | |
| 1995 | Kaw Fung Ying | Shooting | |
| 1995 | Kenneth Low | Squash | |
| 1995 | Anthony Ang | Swimming | |
| 1996 | Rashid Sidek | Badminton | |
| 1996 | Watson Nyambek | Athletics | |
| 1996 | Sazali Samad | Bodybuilding | |
| 1996 | Kenny Ang | Bowling | |
| 1996 | Tsen Seong Hoong | Cycling | |
| 1996 | Karamjit Singh | Rallying | |
| 1996 | Ong Beng Hee | Squash | |
| 1996 | Muhammad Hidayat Hamidon | Weightlifting | |
| 1997 | Cheah Soon Kit and Yap Kim Hock | Badminton | |
| 1997 | Mohd Zaki Sadri | Athletics | |
| 1997 | Ong Ewe Hock | Badminton | |
| 1997 | Rosman Alwi | Cycling | |
| 1997 | Muhammad Hidayat Hamidon | Weightlifting | |
| 1998 | Alex Lim | Swimming | |
| 1998 | G. Saravanan | Athletics | |
| 1998 | Kenny Ang | Bowling | |
| 1998 | Nor Affendy Rosli | Cycling | |
| 1998 | Muhammad Hidayat Hamidon | Weightlifting | |
| 1999 | Shahrulneeza Razali | Cycling | |
| 1999 | Elvin Chia | Swimming | |
| 1999 | Loo Kum Zee | Athletics | |
| 1999 | Choong Tan Fook and Lee Wan Wah | Badminton | |
| 1999 | Ong Beng Hee | Squash | |
| 1999 | Sazali Samad | Bodybuilding | |
| 1999 | Mohd Emran Zakaria | Shooting | |
| 2000 | Sazali Samad | Bodybuilding | |
| 2000 | Ong Beng Hee | Squash | |
| 2000 | Kenny Ang | Bowling | |
| 2000 | Musairi Musa | Cycling | |
| 2000 | Choong Tan Fook and Lee Wan Wah | Badminton | |
| 2000 | Chang Ching Ho | Basketball | |
| 2000 | Mohd. Nasihin Nubli Ibrahim | Field hockey | |
| 2000 | Puvaneswaran Ramasamy | Karate | |
| 2000 | Mohd. Emran Zakaria | Shooting | |
| 2000 | Chan Koon Wah | Table tennis | |
| 2000 | Ahmad Farid Abd. Rahman | Rugby union | |
| 2000 | Elvin Chia | Swimming | |
| 2000 | Zakri Ibrahim | Pencak silat | |
| 2000 | Oh Poh Soon | Wushu | |
| 2001 | Roslin Hashim | Badminton | |
| 2001 | Syed Mohamad Syed Akil | Lawn bowls | |
| 2001 | Ong Beng Hee | Squash | |
| 2001 | Mohd Qabil Ambak Mahamad Fathil | Equestrian | |
| 2002 | Karamjit Singh and Allen Oh | Rallying | |
| 2002 | Amirul Hamizan Ibrahim | Weightlifting | |
| 2002 | Liew Teck Leong | Bodybuilding | |
| 2002 | Puvaneswaran Ramasamy | Karate | |
| 2002 | Alex Lim | Swimming | |
| 2002 | Ho Ro Bin | Wushu | |
| 2002 | Wong Choong Hann | Badminton | |
| 2003 | Nazmizan Mohamad | Athletics | |
| 2003 | Sazali Samad | Bodybuilding | |
| 2003 | Wong Choong Hann | Badminton | |
| 2003 | Azidi Ameran | Bowling | |
| 2003 | Ng Shu Wai | Artistic gymnastics | |
| 2003 | Alex Lim | Swimming | |
| 2004 | Josiah Ng Onn Lam | Cycling | |
| 2004 | Sazali Samad | Bodybuilding | |
| 2004 | Lee Chong Wei | Badminton | |
| 2004 | Alex Lim | Swimming | |
| 2004 | Ho Ro Bin | Wushu | |
| 2004 | Ahmad Shahril Zailuddin | Pencak silat | |
| 2005 | Lee Chong Wei | Badminton | |
| 2005 | Shahadan Jamaludin | Athletics | |
| 2005 | K. Satyaseelan | Basketball | |
| 2005 | Sazali Samad | Bodybuilding | |
| 2005 | Alex Liew Kien Liang | Bowling | |
| 2005 | Suhardi Hassan | Cycling | |
| 2005 | Yeoh Ken Nee | Diving | |
| 2005 | Mohd Qabil Ambak Mahamad Fathil | Equestrian | |
| 2005 | Ng Shu Wai | Artistic gymnastics | |
| 2005 | Kuhan Shanmuganathan | Field hockey | |
| 2005 | Puvaneswaran Ramasamy | Karate | |
| 2005 | Safuan Said | Lawn bowls | |
| 2005 | Mohd Shakirin Ibrahim | Table tennis | |
| 2005 | Pui Fook Chiew | Wushu | |
| 2006 | Sazali Samad | Bodybuilding | |
| 2006 | Koo Kien Keat and Tan Boon Heong | Badminton | |
| 2006 | Safuan Said | Lawn bowls | |
| 2006 | Alex Liew Kien Liang | Bowling | |
| 2007 | Koo Kien Keat and Tan Boon Heong | Badminton | |
| 2007 | Sazali Samad | Bodybuilding | |
| 2007 | Mohd Rizal Tisin | Cycling | |
| 2007 | Koh Way Tek | Basketball | |
| 2007 | Zulmazran Zulkifli | Bowling | |
| 2007 | Mohd Qabil Ambak Mahamad Fathil | Equestrian | |
| 2007 | Chua Boon Huat | Field hockey | |
| 2007 | Lim Yoke Wai | Karate | |
| 2007 | Safuan Said | Lawn bowls | |
| 2007 | Cheng Chu Sian | Archery | |
| 2007 | Lee Hup Wei | Athletics | |
| 2007 | Daniel Bego | Swimming | |
| 2007 | Mohd Azlan Iskandar | Squash | |
| 2008 | Lee Chong Wei | Badminton | |
| 2008 | Azizulhasni Awang | Cycling | |
| 2008 | Zulmazran Zulkifli | Bowling | |
| 2008 | Safuan Said | Lawn bowls | |
| 2008 | Cheng Chu Sian | Archery | |
| 2008 | Lee Hup Wei | Athletics | |
| 2009 | Azizulhasni Awang | Cycling | |
| 2009 | Lee Chong Wei | Badminton | |
| 2009 | Daniel Bego | Swimming | |
| 2009 | Muhammad Farkhan | Boxing | |
| 2009 | Sazali Samad | Bodybuilding | |
| 2009 | Zulmazran Zulkifli | Bowling | |
| 2009 | Muhamad Hatta Mahamut | Karate | |
| 2009 | Loh Jack Chang | Wushu | |
| 2010 | Azizulhasni Awang | Cycling | |
| 2010 | Lee Chong Wei | Badminton | |
| 2010 | Sazali Samad | Bodybuilding | |
| 2010 | Kumar Subramaniam | Field hockey | |
| 2010 | Puvaneswaran Ramasamy | Karate | |
| 2010 | Mohd Azlan Iskandar | Squash | |
| 2010 | Alex Liew Kien Liang | Bowling | |
| 2011 | Lee Chong Wei | Badminton | |
| 2011 | Sazali Samad | Bodybuilding | |
| 2011 | Cheng Chu Sian | Archery | |
| 2011 | Bryan Nickson Lomas | Diving | |
| 2011 | Adrian Ang Hsien Loong | Bowling | |
| 2011 | Ricky Leong Tze Wai | Karate | |
| 2012 | Lee Chong Wei | Badminton | |
| 2012 | Bryan Nickson Lomas | Diving | |
| 2012 | Mohd Syafiq Ridhwan Abdul Malek | Bowling | |
| 2012 | Ricky Leong Tze Wai | Karate | |
| 2012 | Sazali Samad | Bodybuilding | |
| 2012 | Khairul Anuar Mohamad | Archery | |
| 2012 | Yu Peng Kean | Fencing | |
| 2013 | Sazali Samad | Bodybuilding | |
| 2013 | Lee Chong Wei | Badminton | |
| 2013 | Lim Chee Wei | Karate | |
| 2013 | Benjamin Khor Cheng Jie | Shooting | |
| 2013 | Mohd Jironi Riduan | Athletics | |
| 2013 | Ooi Tze Liang | Diving | |
| 2013 | Hon Mun Hua | Wushu | |
| 2014 | Sazali Samad | Bodybuilding | |
| 2014 | Azizulhasni Awang | Cycling | |
| 2014 | Khairulnizam Afendy | Sailing | |
| 2014 | Lee Chong Wei | Badminton | |
| 2014 | Lim Chee Wei | Karate | |
| 2014 | Mohamad Fairus Abd Jabal | Lawn bowls | |
| 2014 | Mohd Al-Jufferi Jamari | Pencak silat | |
| 2014 | Mohd Ezuan Nasir Khan | Shooting | |
| 2014 | Mohd Hafifi Mansor | Weightlifting | |
| 2014 | Mohd Rafiq Ismail | Bowling | |
| 2014 | Ong Beng Hee | Squash | |
| 2014 | Ooi Tze Liang | Diving | |
| 2015 | Mohd Al-Jufferi Jamari | Pencak silat | |
| 2015 | Ooi Tze Liang | Diving | |
| 2015 | Mohd Rafiq Ismail | Bowling | |
| 2015 | Thor Chuan Leong | Billiards and snooker | |
| 2015 | Loh Jack Chang | Wushu | |
| 2015 | Mohd Harrif Salleh | Cycling | |
| 2016 | Abdul Latif Romly | Para-athletics | |
| 2016 | Lee Chong Wei | Badminton | |
| 2016 | Azizulhasni Awang | Cycling | |
| 2016 | Mohd Syarul Azman Mahen Abdullah | Bodybuilding | |
| 2016 | Mohd Rafiq Ismail | Bowling | |
| 2016 | Mohd Al-Jufferi Jamari | Pencak silat | |
| 2017 | Azizulhasni Awang | Cycling | |
| 2017 | Mohd Syarul Azman Mahen Abdullah | Bodybuilding | |
| 2017 | Muhammad Hakimi Ismail | Athletics | |
| 2017 | Gavin Kyle Green | Golf | |
| 2017 | Mohd Fitri Saari | Field hockey | |
| 2017 | Mohd Rafiq Ismail | Bowling | |
| 2017 | Wong Weng Son | Wushu | |
| 2017 | Khairul Hafiz Jantan | Athletics | |
| 2018 | Muhammad Rafiq Ismail | Bowling | |
| 2018 | Azizulhasni Awang | Cycling | |
| 2018 | Mohd Nafiizwan Adnan | Squash | |
| 2018 | Mohd Syarul Azman Mahen Abdullah | Bodybuilding | |
| 2018 | Mohd Fauzi Kaman Shah | Sailing | |
| 2019/ 2020 | Azizulhasni Awang | Cycling | |
| 2019/ 2020 | Khairul Anuar Mohamad | Archery | |
| 2019/ 2020 | Tan Chye Chern | Bowling | |
| 2019/ 2020 | Mohd Syarul Azman Mahen Abdullah | Bodybuilding | |
| 2019/ 2020 | Wong Weng Son | Wushu | |
| 2021 | Azizulhasni Awang | Cycling | |
| 2021 | Aaron Chia and Soh Wooi Yik | Badminton | |
| 2021 | Ng Eain Yow | Squash | |
| 2021 | Buda Anchah | Bodybuilding | |
| 2021 | Syarifuddin Azman | Motorsport | |
| 2022 | Aaron Chia and Soh Wooi Yik | Badminton | |
| 2022 | Mohd Syarul Azman Mahen Abdullah | Bodybuilding | |
| 2022 | Aznil Bidin | Weightlifting | |
| 2022 | Aniq Kasdan | Weightlifting | |
| 2022 | Lim Kok Leong | Snooker | |
| 2023 | Mohd Syarul Azman Mahen Abdullah | Bodybuilding | |
| 2023 | Qabil Ambak | Equestrian | |
| 2023 | Ng Eain Yow | Squash | |
| 2023 | Muhammad Arif Afifuddin Ab Malek | Karate | |
| 2023 | Muhammad Rafiq Ismail | Bowling | |
| 2024 | Aaron Chia and Soh Wooi Yik | Badminton | |
| 2024 | Lee Zii Jia | Badminton | |
| 2024 | Wong Weng Son | Wushu | |
| 2024 | Aniq Kasdan | Weightlifting | |
| 2024 | Abdul Latif Maxzakir | Pencak silat | |

== See also ==
- Anugerah Sukan Negara for Sportswoman of the Year
- Athlete of the Year
