= Twinkletoes (book series) =

Children's book series

- Authors: Thomas Koh & Titian
- Original title: Twinkletoes
- Language: English
- Genre: Fiction
- Publisher: Angsana Books, Flame Of The Forest Publishing (flameoftheforest.com)
- Publication date: 2008 (Earliest, Twinkletoes #1); 2019 (Latest, Twinkletoes #19)
- Publication place: Singapore

Twinkletoes is a children's fiction book series by Thomas Koh, with illustrations by Titian. The series is published by Angsana Books, Flame Of The Forest Publishing. 19 books have been released so far since the first book, A Star Is Born, was published in 2008.

The title of the book series, Twinkletoes, drew its inspiration from Chia Boon Leong, a Singaporean footballer who was nicknamed "Twinkletoes" in the 1950s for his amazing footwork and ball control.

== Premise ==
The series features Leandro Giovanni Ang Soon Huat as its main character and follows the adventures of Leandro and his football team from Morrison High School. School principal Mr Billy Chin, and Leandro's friends, Jasmine, Hock Ann and Augustine are some of the other characters.

== Authors ==
Thomas Koh, a sports correspondent with The Straits Times for 10 years, writes the stories, and Titian, a world class artist whose works have been displayed in top art galleries across Europe and the US, does all the illustrations.

== Books ==
The latest book in the Twinkletoes series is Twinkletoes #19, Undercover Angel.

The Complete List
Book	Title	Year Published
1	A Star Is Born	2008
2	The Dream Team	2009
3	Master Of The Game	2009
4	The Malacca Escapade	2010
5	The Showdown	2010
6	In The Wilderness	2010
7	The Treasure Hunt	2010
8	The Ultimate Challenge	2010
9	Lights, Camera, Action!	2011
10	Adventure On The High Seas	2011
11	Battle In Barcelona	2012
12	Big In Japan	2012
13	Shanghai Surprise	2013
14	Mission Impossible: New York City	2013
15	Race Against Time	2014
16	The Priceless Scrolls	2016
17	Trouble In Paradise	2017
18	Yamashita’s Gold	2018
19	Undercover Angel	2019
