= Mohammed Bakar =

Malaysian footballer (1945–2020)

Dato' Mohammed Bakar DSPN, AMN
Personal information
- Full name: Mohammed bin Bakar
- Date of birth: 25 June 1945
- Place of birth: Bagan Ajam, Straits Settlements
- Date of death: 8 November 2020 (aged 75)
- Position: Winger

Youth career
- 1964–1965: Penang FA

Senior career*
| Years | Team | Apps | (Gls) |
| 1965–1977 | Penang FA | | |

International career
| 1970–1975 | Malaysia | | |

Managerial career
- 1985–1986: Malaysia
- * Club domestic league appearances and goals

Dato' Mohammed Bin Bakar (or Mohamad Bin Bakar) DSPN AMN (25 June 1945 – 8 November 2020) was a Malaysian footballer.

== Career ==
A teacher by profession (as Malaysia football is not professional in his time), Mohamed represented Penang FA during his football career. Mohamed competed for the Malaysia national team in the men's tournament at the 1972 Summer Olympics and went on as a substitute to replace Shaharuddin Abdullah in the 3-0 win against the United States.

He was also in the coaching staff when Malaysia qualified again for the 1980 Olympics, though the Olympics were later boycotted by Malaysia. He was earlier the team head coach when Malaysia won the 1979 Southeast Asian Games gold medal, but the Football Association of Malaysia recorded Karl-Heinz Weigang, who was then the national team advisor, as the winning head coach. Later, he was the Malaysia head coach for the ill-fated 1986 FIFA World Cup qualification in 1985.

In 2004, he was inducted in Olympic Council of Malaysia's Hall of Fame for 1972 Summer Olympics football team and also awarded Maal Hijrah Sports Figure by Penang Malay Association.

== Death ==
On 8 November 2020, Datuk Mohamad Bakar died at the Universiti Sains Malaysia Advanced Medical and Dental Institute (IPPT), Kepala Batas. He was 75.

== Honours ==
Player

- Bronze medal Asian Games: 1974
- Merdeka Cup: 1973, 1974
- Burnley Cup: 1964/65
- Malaysia Kings Gold Cup: 1966, 1968, 1969
- Malaysia Cup: 1974

Coaching staff

- Gold medal SEA Games: 1979

Head coach

- Merdeka Cup: 1979
- Bronze medal SEA Games: 1985

=== Orders ===
- Malaysia
  - Member of the Order of the Defender of the Realm (A.M.N.) in 1978
  - Officer of the Order of the Defender of State (DSPN) – Dato’ in 2015
