= Shukor Salleh =

Malaysian footballer

Dato' Shukor Salleh AMN DSPN
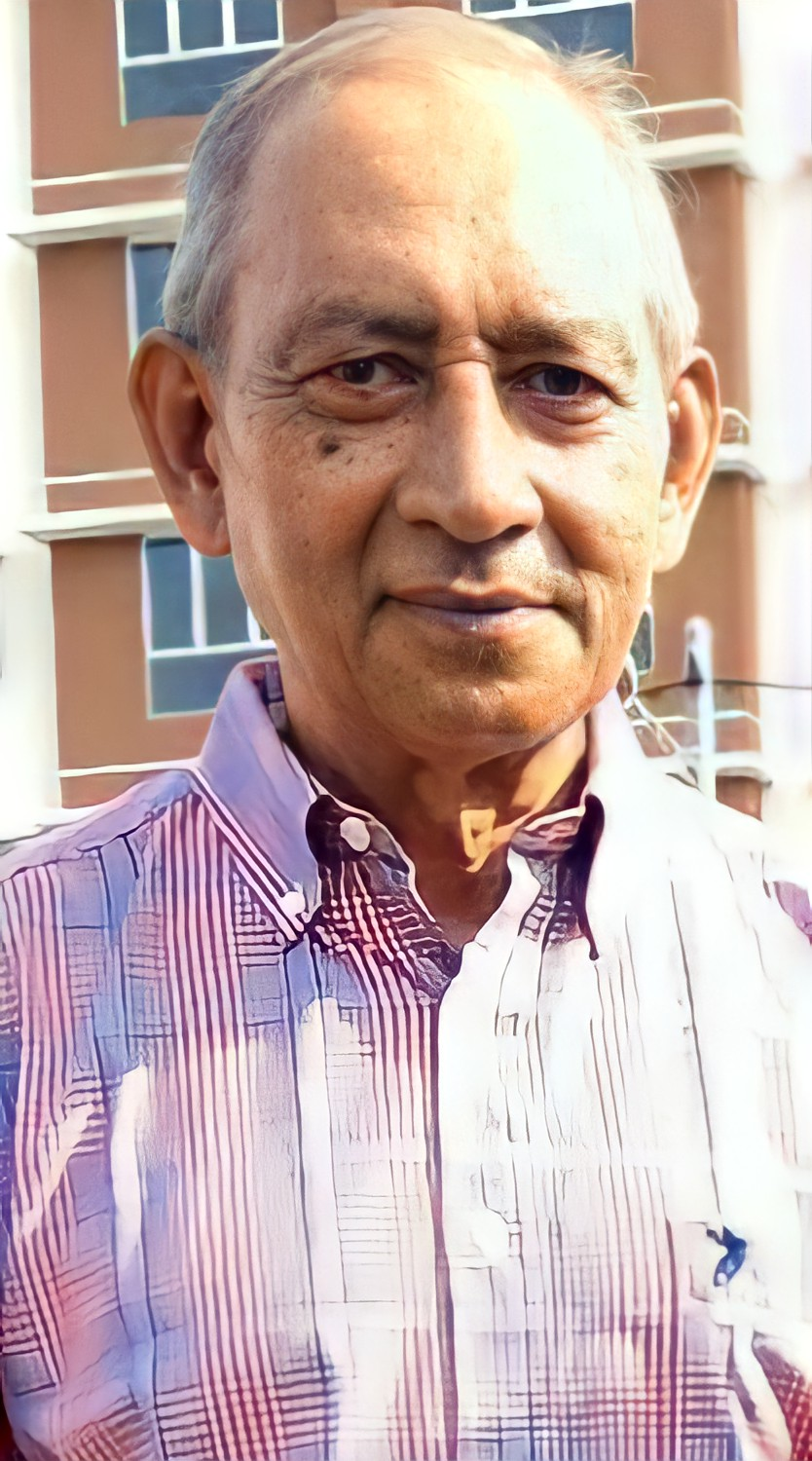
- Shukor Salleh in 2019

Personal information
- Full name: Abdul Shukor bin Salleh
- Date of birth: 4 December 1948 (age 77)
- Place of birth: Tanjung Bungah, Penang, Federation of Malaya
- Position: Defensive midfielder

Youth career
- 1965–1966: Penang FA

Senior career*
Years	Team	Apps	(Gls)
1966–1985	Penang FA		

International career
1970–1981	Malaysia	172	(5)
Medal record
Men's football
Representing Malaysia
Asian Games
Third place	1974 Tehran	Team
SEA Games
Gold medal – first place	1977 Kuala Lumpur	Team
Gold medal – first place	1979 Jakarta	Team
Silver medal – second place	1975 Bangkok	Team
Bronze medal – third place	1973 Singapore	Team
- * Club domestic league appearances and goals

Dato' Abdul Shukor bin Salleh DSPN AMN (born 4 December 1948) is a Malaysian former professional footballer. He was a key midfield player for the Malaysia national team during the 1970s. He was often called the "Mr.Cool" and "Malaysia Ardiles" of the Malaysian national team for the composure with which he steered the Malaysian midfield. He won the Malaysian National Sportsman Award in 1977 for his contribution to the national team. Furthermore, he was the second and the last football player after Mokhtar Dahari to be given that award. On 17 September 2014, FourFourTwo list him on their list of the top 25 Malaysian footballers of all time. He was inducted into the FIFA Century Club in May 2021.

== Career overview ==
Shukor Salleh was born in Tanjung Bungah, Penang in 1948. He received his early education at Tanjung Bungah Malay School, before going to Tanjung Tokong English School. He then completed his high school education at St. Xavier's Institution.

Shukor made his debut as a player with the Penang at the age of 18 in 1966. He went on to play for them until he was 37 in 1985.

Shukor first played for the Malaysian national team in 1970 King's Cup. He also played for the national B team from 1971 until 1972. He went on to play a total of 215 matches for Malaysia (including non 'A' matches). 172 caps is against full national team. He is the second most capped Malaysian player, behind Soh Chin Ann.

He played for Malaysia at many international tournaments including four editions of the SEA Games, two Asian Games and two AFC Asian Cup.

On 11 May 1975, Shukor is part of the Malaysia Selection that played against Arsenal FC in a friendly match which his team won by 2–0 at Merdeka Stadium.

He also was a key player in midfield to the Malaysian team that qualified to the 1980 Olympic games Moscow which Malaysia boycotted. Malaysia won the play-off against South Korea with a 2–1 score in the Merdeka Stadium.

During his international career, Shukor had a total of 215 appearances for Malaysia (including matches played against club sides, national 'B' teams and selection teams). Against other nations' national 'A' teams, he had a total of 172 appearances and scored 5 goals for the national team. He is one of the most international caps with 150 or more appearances for national team in international history and the second most capped Malaysian player, after Soh Chin Ann.

== After retirement ==
For his contribution to Malay football community in Penang state as a coach and speaker, he was awarded Maal Hijrah Sports Figure by Penang Malay Association in 2002.

== Career statistics ==
Scores and results list Malaysia's goal tally first, score column indicates score after each Shukor goal.

List of international goals scored by Shukor Salleh
No.	Date	Venue	Opponent	Score	Result	Competition
1	15 November 1970	Bangkok, Thailand	South Vietnam		2–1	1970 King's Cup
2	2 September 1973	Singapore	Thailand		1−1	1973 SEAP
3	23 March 1975	Bangkok, Thailand	South Vietnam		3−0	1976 AFC Asian Cup qualification
4	14 August 1975	Kuala Lumpur, Malaysia	Indonesia		2−1	1975 Merdeka Tournament
5	13 September 1976	Seoul, South Korea	Singapore		4–1	1976 President's Cup

== Honours ==
Penang

- Burnley Cup: 1966
- Malaysia Kings Gold Cup: 1968, 1969
- Malaysia Cup: 1974
- Aga Khan Gold Cup: 1976
- Malaysian League: 1982

Malaysia

- Bronze medal Asian Games: 1974
- Gold Medal SEA Games: 1977, 1979
- King's Cup: 1972, 1977
- Merdeka Tournament: 1973, 1974, 1976, 1979
- South Vietnam Independence Cup: 1971

Individual

- Malaysian National Sportsman Award: 1977
- Penang Men’s Athletes Award: 1978/1979
- AFC Century Club Awards: 1999
- Goal.com The best Malaysia XI of all time: 2020
- IFFHS Men’s All Time Malaysia Dream Team: 2022

=== Orders ===
- Malaysia
  - Member of the Order of the Defender of the Realm (AMN) (1978)
  - Officer of the Order of the Defender of State (DSPN) – Dato'

== See also ==
- List of men's footballers with 100 or more international caps
