= Penjara F.C. =

Malaysian football club

Penjara FC
- Full name: Penjara Football Club
- Nickname: The Pride Waves
- Founded: 1952; 74 years ago
- Ground: Kajang Prison Complex Mini Stadium
- Capacity: 1,000
- Owner: Malaysia Prison Department Sports Council
- Chairman: Zulkifli Omar
- Coach: Roslan Othman
- League: Shah Amateur League
- 2019: Malaysia M3 League, 13th (relegated)

Penjara Football Club is a Malaysian football club based in Kajang, Selangor, Malaysia. They currently play in the fourth-tier division in Malaysian football, the Shah Amateur League.

They have recently played in the third-tier division in Malaysian football, the Malaysia FAM League from 2015 until 2017.

The team was established as part of Malaysian Prison Department Sports Council. The Prisons were first known to play football sometime in the 1950s. However, not many records are kept or known.

== Coaches ==
Year	Coach
Dec 2014– Jan 2015	(Malaysia) Mohd Nidzam Jamil
Feb 2015	(Malaysia) Hamzah Hussain
May 2015– Oct 2016	(Malaysia) Abdul Rahim Abdullah
Nov 2016	(Malaysia) Hasnan Ahmad
March 2019–	(Malaysia) Roslan Othman

== Management team ==
=== Club personnel ===
- Manager: Nordin Muhammad
- Assistant Manager: Shahrul Nizam Hussain
- Head coach: Roslan Othman
- Assistant head coach: Abdul Razak Abdullah
- Fitness Coach: Noor Muhammad Arif Zainuddin
- Goalkeeping coach: Mohd Tarmizie Abdul Rahim
- Head Physio: Nurul Hisyam Azmi
- Asst Physio: Abdul Jalil Ahmad

== Honours ==
- Malaysia FAM League
  - (gold) Champion(3) :1970,1971,1973
- PBNS M5 League
  - (gold) Champion(1) : 2018

== Notable former players ==
- Namat Abdullah
- Shaharuddin Abdullah
- Syed Ahmad Syed Abu Bakar
