= Penang F.C. =

Malaysian football club in George Town

Penang
- Full name: Penang Football Club
- Nickname: Harimau Kumbang (The Black Panthers)
- Founded: 1920; 106 years ago (unofficial); 21 October 1921; 105 years ago as Penang FA; 2020; 6 years ago as Penang Football Club
- Ground: City Stadium
- Capacity: 23,000
- Owner: Penang Football Club Sdn Bhd
- Chairman: Daniel Gooi
- Head coach: Victor Andrag (interim)
- League: Malaysia Super League
- 2024–25: Super League, 10th of 13
- Website: www.penangfc.com.my
Home colours	Away colours

Penang Football Club (simply known as Penang FC) is a Malaysian professional football club based in George Town, Penang, that competes in Malaysia Super League, the top tier of Malaysian football.

Unofficially founded in 1920 and officially as Football Association of Penang on 21 October 1921, the club represents the state of Penang in football tournaments. The team has traditionally worn a blue home kit according to their state flag colours.

They have a long-standing rivalry with Kedah; the two teams from the northern region of Malaysia being engaged in what has been collectively known as the "Northern Region Derby". The club plays their home matches at the 20,000 capacity City Stadium in George Town.

Penang had established itself as a major force in Malaysian football between the 1950s to the 1970s. Domestically, Penang has won 2 Malaysia Super League titles, 1 Malaysia Premier League title, 4 Malaysia Cup, 1 Malaysia FA Cup title and 1 Malaysia Charity Shield. At present, it is one of the 12 teams competing in the Malaysian Super League and the first club from Malaysia to win an Asian title, Aga Khan Gold Cup, which was the early version of AFC Champions League in 1976.

On 16 February 2016, Faiz Subri scored a free kick in a 4–1 win over Pahang FA at the City Stadium in George Town. Videos of his free kick soon went viral on social media, and he was nominated by the Football Association of Malaysia for the FIFA Puskás Award later that year. In 2017, Faiz was awarded the FIFA Puskás Award for the free kick goal, becoming the first-ever Asian to have won the international award for the best goal of the year.

== History ==
=== Early years (1920–1934) ===
The club was founded in 1920, and officially as Football Association of Penang (FAP) in 1921. Penang is the oldest football club in Malaysia and one of the oldest clubs in Asia. Penang is the fourth most successful team in Malaysian football history with 16 titles.

On 21 October 1921, the club was officially founded. Almost all the big matches were played at Victoria Green, home of the Chinese Recreation Club. They lost its first cup final in 1934 to Singapore FA with a score of 1–2.

=== Glory days (1950–1977) ===
The 1950s saw Penang producing players such as the country's first Olympian, Yeap Cheng Eng, Yeang Kah Chong, Tan Swee Hock, Wong Kam Poh, Yap Hin Hean, Liew Fee Yuen, Lee Ah Loke, and the Pang brothers. Since the early 1950s, Aziz Ahmad was Penang's top goal-scorer. He scored the winning goal as Penang defeated Singapore 3–2 in the 1953 Malaya Cup final in Ipoh. Penang won 3 Malaysia Cups (1953, 1954 and 1958) and 4 FAM Cup champions (1952, 1955, 1956 and 1957). Some of the well-known FAP officials were Loh Hoot Yeang, who was president for many years, A. S. Mohamad Mydin, Tan Cheng Hoe, Yaakob Syed and Haris Hussain. David Choong was president in 1962 when Penang made the FAM Cup final, but lost 3–4 to Selangor in a contest on May 12 at the City Stadium. In October 1963, Penang trounced Perlis 13–0 in a Malaysia Cup tie. Aziz took over as captain when Cheng Eng retired. By 1965, veterans such as Siang Teik and Aziz made way as Penang rebuilt. M. Kuppan took over as captain with Yeap Kim Hock, James Raju and Ibrahim Mydin.

For the first time, Penang preferred the services of four British airmen based at the RAF support unit at the Butterworth base, which participated in the local league. They were John Leather, Clive Warren, Vic Probert and Alan Peacock. The late 1960s saw the emergence of Aziz's nephews, the Abdullah brothers, Namat and Shaharuddin. At his peak, Shaharuddin was a goal-scorer together with Isa Bakar. Penang made the Malaysia Cup final in 1968 to face mighty Selangor. Selangor romped home 8–1 in one of the most one-sided finals ever In 1974, Penang heroically knocked Singapore out in the semifinal to face northern rival Perak in the final. Namat Abdullah led Penang to a 2–1 victory in what was to be the state's last Malaysia Cup final victory. Penang stepped into the final of Malaysia Cup in 1977 as they lost the match to Singapore. In 1976, Penang became the first and only club from Malaysia to win the Aga Khan Gold Cup which was the early version of the Asian Club Championship, beating Dhaka Mohammedan Sporting Club 3–0 in the final at the Bangabandhu National Stadium under the guidance of Lim Boon Kheng.

=== Stagnation and resurgence (1982–2002) ===
Football Association of Malaysia introduced the Malaysia First Division League in 1982. Penang was one of the founding members of the league. The first edition saw Penang becoming the champion. In 1983, Penang was the first runner-up of the league. After that, the team faced stagnation until the mid-1990s and failed to win any major trophy.

The glory days came after more than 15 years. Penang entered into the FA Cup final in 1997 and lost to Selangor. After the disappointment, Penang won the 1998 Malaysia Super League. The team failed to defend the title as they were the runners-up in 1999. The 2000 FA Cup saw Penang lost to Terengganu after a nail-biting penalties. Penang was the runner-up of the top division in 2000. After two consecutive years as the runner-up, Penang become the champion in 2001. Penang FA historically won the FA Cup for the first time in 2002.

=== Walking downhill and financial crisis (2003–2009) ===
Although the team got a good start by winning the first Charity Shield, they finished mid-table in the league and third in the group stage of the Malaysia Cup. In 2004, Penang ranked fifth out of 8 in the league and got eliminated in the second round of the FA Cup. The league performance in 2006 was a bit worse as they ranked sixth. Penang won the first round of the FA Cup, but failed to qualify for the third round. The next season saw Penang ranked sixth in the league and lose the first round of the FA Cup. The team lost the quarter-final matches of the Malaysia Cup. In 2006–07 season, the team ranked tenth throughout the league. Penang finished the journey of the FA Cup in round one, as fifth out of six in the group stage. Mohd Bakar was appointed in the 2007–08 season. The Panthers finished 12th in the league, round two in FA Cup and last in the Malaysia Cup group stage. From then until 2012, the club was facing a critical financial condition. In 2009, Penang FA finished third from the last in the top division league. Penang was knocked out from the FA Cup in round two for two consecutive years. Penang was eliminated from the Malaysia Cup tournament after finished third in the group stage.

=== Darkest period (2010–2012) ===
In 2010, the darkest period ever in the team history came. Reduan Abdullah squad had only collected 10 points and finished at the bottom of the league. Penang was relegated from the top flight after 18 consecutive spells. The club continued to decline and in 2011 they were relegated further, after the team struggled in the second division with only 4 points in 22 matches. Janos Krecska was appointed as head coach in 2012. The team finished mid-table in the third tier.

=== The comeback (2013–2015) ===
Penang FA's legend, Merzagua Abderrazak, took over in 2013. The aim of the promotion was achieved successfully under the new tactician. Penang won a silverware after an 11-year wait. The club appointed K. Devan as the new head coach. Under his guidance Penang claimed the third spot of the Premier League and qualified in the Malaysia Cup after four years. Penang finished last in the group stage with four points after six matches. K. Devan's contract was not renewed and he was signed by Negeri Sembilan. Jacksen F. Tiago took over for the next season. Penang stepped into the quarter-final of the Malaysia FA Cup after 13 years. A dramatic finish in the 2015 league campaign saw Penang FA as the runner-up and a ticket to the top flight.

=== In the top flight (2016–2017) ===
Penang beefed their squad with several youngsters from the Harimau Muda project and signed three new imports. The Panthers were hopeful of at least staying in the Malaysia Super League, but found themselves stuck in the relegation zone. The appointment of the MSL winning coach Bojan Hodak as chief executive officer and Nenad Bacina as head coach offered some promise for the second half of the season, but Penang still struggled to find consistency. It wasn't until the final day of the season that Penang saved their top flight status, thanks to the goal from Faizat Ghazli.

I-League winning coach Ashley Westwood signed a two years contract with the club in November 2016 to replace Nenad and Bojan. However, Penang FA terminated their contract under mutual consent due to poor results in March 2017, and he was replaced by Zainal Abidin Hassan. Zairil Khir Johari, who took over from Nazir Ariff Mushir Ariff, has resigned as president of the Penang Football Association (FA). Former player Reinaldo Lobo had reported PFA to FIFA after the club failed to pay him for six months.

=== Relegated to the Malaysia Premier League (2018–2020) ===
After the relegation, Zainal Abidin Hassan remains the head coach. Players like Mohd Faiz Subri, Yong Kuong Yong, Sanna Nyassi and Mohd Azrul Ahmad were retained. The departures saw Syamer Kutty Abba moving to Johor, Jafri Firdaus Chew & K. Reuben to PKNS FC, Rafiuddin Rodin to Perak. They finished in 10th position and avoided a successive drop.

Dr. Amar Pritpal Abdullah was elected as Penang FA president after edging out Datuk Seri Ho Kwee Cheng. Penang FA searched for stability ahead of the 2019 season under the helm of new management. The FA of Penang have set a modest target, to stay in the Premier League. Manzoor Azwira bought new import player like Casagrande and Sergio Aguero and Penang FA climbed to the 2nd place, securing the Super League promotion. However, less than 24 hours later, Penang FA found themselves back in the Premier League after being docked six points due to Reinaldo Lobo case.

In 2020 the government stopped all sports activities due to the COVID-19 pandemic. Penang FA was on track of winning the league after being unbeaten in 8 matches. They secure promotion to the Super League after beating Kuala Lumpur 2–1 at City Stadium. Penang celebrated their first ever MPL title after beating Kelantan United 4-0 and got promoted to the 2021 Malaysia Super League.

=== Privatisation (2020) ===
On 21 September 2020, Penang FA was officially privatised and rebranded as Penang Football Club. Subsequently, Penang FC Sdn. Bhd. was established as a subsidiary of the Penang state government under Chief Minister Incorporated (CMI), a state government agency.

This privatisation step is part of the Football Association of Malaysia (FAM) efforts to comply with FIFA's directive, which requires a separation between football governing bodies and professional clubs. The rebranding also includes a new logo and visual identity to reflect the modern era of football in Penang.

The Football Association of Penang (FAP) remains the governing body responsible for grassroots development, while Penang FC Sdn. Bhd. operates as a corporate entity managing the state’s professional football team.

=== Return to the top flight (2021–present) ===
Penang achieved third place in the 2021 Malaysia Super League, marking a significant milestone in the club's history since the inaugural 2004 Malaysia Super League season. It was their first season in the top tier of Malaysian football following their promotion in 2020.

Although the club performed well in the cup by reaching the 2022 Malaysia FA Cup semi-final, Penang struggled in the league, finishing 12th which meant basically at the bottom of the table in the 2022 Malaysia Super League, a position that would normally mean relegation to the Premier League. However, they were not relegated because the MFL officially denied Melaka United and Sarawak United club licensing approval, as both clubs faced financial issues. Furthermore, the situation coincided with a major league restructuring by the MFL, which abolished the Premier League and expanded the Malaysia Super League beginning in 2023, allowing Penang to retain their place in the top flight.

For the 2024–25 season (the first season to have a two-year schedule since 2007–08), Penang is ranked tenth in the league out of 13 competing clubs, maintaining the same position as last season.

== Team image ==
=== Crest and colours ===
Since its foundation in 1921, the club has had two main crests. The first had background colours of the club crest, navy blue and white. At the top left and bottom right of the crest are the capital letters of 'F' and 'A', which are the abbreviation of 'Football Association'. At the bottom left is a leather ball. The Prince of Wales's feathers and its motto, 'Ich Dien' which means 'I serve' were at top left of the crest. The name of the state, 'Penang', is written in capital letters.

In the early 1990s, the crest underwent some variations as part of an attempt to modernise the previous crest. The capital letters of 'F' and 'A' were changed into three-dimensional form, with navy blue edges and white fill colour. The ball at the bottom left was changed into a modern ball with pentagonal and hexagonal patterns, and the Prince of Wales's feathers on the top left were also modernised, colours for both elements were changed. Penang's traditional home colours are sky blue and yellow which are taken from the colours of the Penang state flag. Navy blue and yellow have also been used severally. Traditional away kit colours have been either yellow or white.

=== Finances and ownership ===
The club is owned by the Penang Chief Minister Incorporated as one of the GLCs, under the chairmanship of Soon Lip Chee, who is also the Penang State Executive Councillor for Youth and Sports. Prior to the privatisation of Malaysian League, the club was owned by the Football Association of Penang (FAP), in which the association also runs the domestic leagues of the states, which is known as FAP League.

FAP was also troubled with debts and players' salary payments were reportedly delayed two to three months over the two years. The delayed salary payments were said to have led some players to take money from bookies to give away games. The poor performance of the Penang team, languishing at the bottom of the Premier League table, also kicked up storm at the Penang State Legislative Assembly in May 2011.

=== Supporters ===
Penang's traditional fanbase comes from all over the George Town area including the other suburbs such as Jelutong, Air Itam, Tanjung Bungah, Bayan Lepas and even from the mainland. Penang's hardcore supporters are the so-called Ultras Panthers supporters, also known as Green Terrace Comrades UP11. Ultras Panthers was founded in 2011. In every match the Penang team played, they will be found in a group standing at the supporters area. The main colours for these supporters are usually in blue with a blue-yellow scarf and banners just like the Penang's team kits colours. These supporters always bring drums and large colorful flags to the stadiums.

Established in 2017, the Penang Football Fans Club (PFFC) is the official supporter club which is registered under the law of Malaysia. The main mission of PFFC is to unite football supporters in Penang. Besides it will also act as a channel between the fans and the team.

There are also numerous supporters clubs such as Demi Pulau Pinang, Penang Brotherhood, Penang FC Fan Club, Haria Penang 69, Nindia Bandaraya, Brigade 07, Boys Of North and more in the state. Penang had an average gate of 7,301 in the 2016 competitive campaign. Sometimes, tourists from foreign countries also attended the matches.

As of June 2020, Penang had 134,650 followers on social media, the ninth highest among football clubs in Malaysia.

At matches, Penang fanatic fans sing chants such as "Haria Penang Haria", "Sehati Sejiwa" which means "One Heart, One Soul" and the state anthem "Untuk Negeri Kita", which means "For our state", to boost their beloved players' morale. Fans also throw toilet rolls to the pitch before the match begins. The well-known and popular slogan among Penang FC supporters is "Haria Penang Haria". It is used as "words of spirit" during and off the game, and as the slogan among supporters.

=== Rivalries ===
Kedah Darul Aman is the biggest rival for Penang. Penang fans consider their main rivalries to be with (in order) Kedah, Perak and Perlis. Matches against fellow northern region sides Perlis United, Kuala Muda Naza, Kedah United, Sungai Ara, PBAPP, SDMS Kepala Batas, Bukit Tambun, and Perak YBU have only taken place intermittently, due to the clubs often being in separate divisions.

==== Northern Region Derby ====
Northern Region Derby is the name given to football matches that involves Penang and Kedah. Both of them were located in the northern region of Malaysia. City Stadium or Penang State Stadium and Darul Aman Stadium are packed by fans from Kedah and Penang during derby matches. The match usually creates a lively atmosphere, with numerous banners unfolded before the start of the game.

=== Friendships ===
Although Penang's main rivals mostly are from the northern region of Malaysia, especially Kedah, but there is also a strong supporter of friendship with Kedah and there are good relations with the fans of Perak and Perlis. "This is the northern region", is a slogan which shows their good friendships.

== Kit suppliers and shirt sponsors ==
Season	Kit manufacturer	Shirt sponsor
2000	(England) Umbro	Pensonic
2001–2003	(England) Umbro	Toray Pen-Group
2004–2005	(England) Umbro	Toray Pen-Group
2006–2007	(Italy) Lotto	E&O
2008–2009	(Indonesia) Specs	Telekom Malaysia
2010	(Spain) Joma	Telekom Malaysia
2011	(Malaysia) Eutag	Telekom Malaysia
2012	(Spain) Joma	Allianz University College of Medical Science
2013	(Spain) Joma	Media Hiburan
2014–2015	(England) Umbro	Aspen Group
2016	(England) Umbro	Penang Water Supply Corporation
2017	(Italy) Legea	myPenang
2018	(Germany) Puma	Penang State Government
2019–2020	(Malaysia) Stallion	Penang State Government
2021–2022	(Germany) Puma	Penang 2030
2023–2026	(Malaysia) Kaki Jersi	Penang 2030
2026–present	(Thailand) FBT	Penang 2030

== Stadium ==
=== Home ground ===
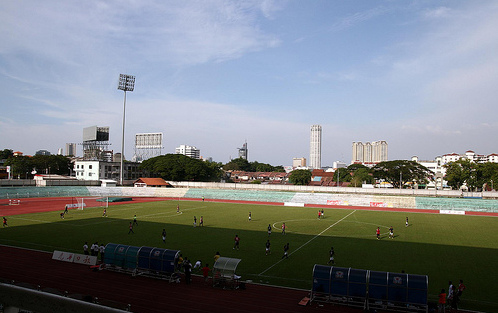
Penang City Stadium

Up to the late 1950s, almost all the big matches were played at Victoria Green, home of the Chinese Recreation Club, before the completion of the City Stadium in the 1950s. Penang State Stadium which is located in Batu Kawan was also the home ground of the club from 2000 to 2011 and 2016 to 2017. It was built in 2000 with a capacity of 40,00. The City Stadium has a capacity of 20,000 people. The oldest stadium still in use in Malaysia, it was built in 1948 to provide a venue for sports activities in George Town. It is also well known for the vociferous home support, dubbed the "Keramat Roar". In 2019, the state football team then returned to the City Stadium after using the Penang State Stadium. In 2018, this stadium hosted the inaugural Asia Pacific Masters Games.

=== Training ground ===
The Jawi Public Field is the training ground of Penang located in South Seberang Perai District. Previously, the USM Sports Centre was the training ground, located in the campus of University of Science, Malaysia. Sometimes, Penang also trains at the Penang Sports Club.

== Players ==
=== First-team squad ===
As of 22 August 2026

Note: Flags indicate national team as defined under FIFA eligibility rules; some limited exceptions apply. Players may hold more than one non-FIFA nationality.

No.	Pos.	Nation	Player
1	GK	MAS	Khairulazhan Khalid
3	DF	MAS	Fazly Mazlan
6	DF	MAS	Khairul Akmal
7	FW	UZB	Murodbek Oybek
8	MF	PHI	OJ Porteria
9	FW	FRA	Enzo Célestine
11	FW	PHI	Jarvey Gayoso
13	FW	MAS	Khalai'f Naskam
14	MF	MAS	Firdaus Saiyadi
15	DF	ARG	Stefano Brundo
16	MF	SRB	Dejan Tumbas (on loan from Persis Solo)
17	MF	MAS	Danie Asyraf
18	FW	MAS	Ad'dha Nazman
19	MF	MAS	Chia Ruo Han
20	MF	MAS	Danial Haqim

No.	Pos.	Nation	Player
22	GK	MAS	Ramadhan Hamid
28	MF	MAS	Akid Zamri
29	FW	MAS	Suhaimi Abu
32	FW	MAS	Shahrel Fikri
33	DF	MAS	Juzaerul Jasmi
36	GK	MAS	Ashriq Izzat Mazlan
37	FW	MAS	Haqimi Azim (on loan from Johor Darul Ta'zim F.C.)
46	GK	MAS	Hakeem Hamidun
50	DF	MAS	Rakesh Munusamy
55	DF	NGR	Faith Friday Obilor
57	DF	MAS	G. Durrkeswaran
67	DF	MAS	Fahmi Daniel
77	MF	UZB	Kosimov Bakhtiyorjon
80	MF	MAS	Izzat Zikri
92	MF	MAS	Aliff Haiqal (on loan from Selangor FC)

=== Development squads ===
For further information: Penang F.C. Reserves

== Management and staff ==
=== Board of directors ===
Position	Name
Chairman	(Malaysia) YB Daniel Gooi
General manager	(Malaysia) Jeffrey Chew
Board members	(Malaysia) Dato' Zakuan Zakaria (Malaysia) Faidrol Radzi (Malaysia) Muashraf Mohamed (Malaysia) YB Dato' Zabidah Safar (Malaysia) Datin Bharathi Suppiah (Malaysia) YB Kumaresan Aramugam

=== Management ===
Position	Name
Team manager	(Malaysia) Noor Azrul Mansor
Technical director	(Malaysia) Rosle Md Derus
Media officer	(Malaysia) Tun Mohammad Fadzrul Redza
Security officer	(Malaysia) Mogan Subramaniam
General coordinator	(Malaysia) Shamsul Mohd Nor

=== Coaching staff ===
Position	Name
Head coach	(Malaysia) Wan Rohaimi
Assistant coach	(Malaysia) Chan Wing Hoong
Assistant coach	(Malaysia) Mat Saiful Mohamad
Goalkeeping coach	(Malaysia) Hisham Jainudin
Fitness coach	(Malaysia) Rozy Abdul Majid
Team doctor	(Malaysia) Dr. Hardeep Singh Jaginder Singh (Malaysia) Dato' Dr. Parmjit Singh Kuldip Singh
Sports Nutritionist	(Malaysia) Esther Ting
Physiotherapist	(Malaysia) Ridhwan Noor Akmal
Team analyst	(Malaysia) Irfan Mustafa
Masseur	(Malaysia) Megat Khusaini
Kitman	(Malaysia) Sufie Noorazizan

== Honours ==
Penang are the fifth most successful football club in Malaysia for having won a total of 15 Malaysian football titles. Penang won the inaugural Malaysia League 1982 and FAM Cup 1952. The club's highest ever league finish was 1st in the Super League in 1982, 1998 and 2001. Their lowest ever league finish was 6th in the 2012 Malaysia FAM League. Penang's biggest win in Malaysia Cup final was 3–0 against Singapore FA in 1954. Penang heaviest lost in Malaysia Cup final was 1–8 against Selangor FA in 1968.

Type	Competition	Titles	Seasons
Domestic	Liga Perdana 1 / Malaysia Super League (First division)	2	1998, 2001
Domestic	Malaysia Premier League (Second division)	1	2020
Domestic	Malaysian League / Malaysian Semi-Pro Football League Division I (Amateur divison)	1	1982
Domestic	Piala Emas Raja-Raja	9	1951, 1956, 1966, 1968, 1969, 1986, 1998, 2002, 2017
Domestic	Malaysia Cup	4	1953, 1954, 1958, 1974
Domestic	Malaysia FA Cup	1	2002
Domestic	Malaysia Charity Shield	1	2003
Domestic	MFL Challenge Cup	1	2026
Domestic	Malaysia FAM Cup	5	*1952, 1955, 1956, 1957, 2013
Domestic	Piala Agong	3	1998, 1999, 2000
Domestic	Malaysia President Cup	1	2004
Continental	Aga Khan Gold Cup	1	1976

Bold is for those competition that are currently active.

== Award winners ==
=== Domestic ===
- Most Valuable Player
  - (Malaysia) Haziq Kutty Abba (2025–26)
  - (Malaysia) Hazwan Bakri (2016)
- League Golden Boot
  - (Brazil) Casagrande (2020) (Malaysia Premier League)

=== Continental ===
==== FIFA ====
- FIFA Puskás Award
  - (Malaysia) Mohd Faiz Subri (2016)

Player	Honour	Season
(Malaysia) Shukor Salleh	National Sportsman of the Year AFC Century Club FIFA Century Club	1977
(Morocco) Merzagua Abderrazak	Malaysia National Football Award Best Import Player	1996
(Malaysia) Azman Adnan	Malaysia Premier League 1 Golden Boot	1999
(Malaysia) Norizam Salaman	Malaysia FAM League Top Goalscorer	2013
(Malaysia) Mohd Faiz Subri	FIFA Puskás Award; FAM Special Award	2016; 2016
(Brazil) Casagrande	Malaysia Premier League Golden Boot	2020

== Records and statistics ==
=== Player records ===
Shukor Salleh is the player who played for the club for the longest time which is 20 years. He had only played for Penang in his career. He won the National Sportsman Award in 1977. Furthermore, he was the second and the last football player after Mokhtar Dahari to be given that award. He was also the first Penang player to be awarded the AFC Century Club award in 1999 and included in the FIFA Century Club for representing the national team at least 100 times in international tournaments.

Lutz Pfannenstiel, He holds the record for the only footballer to play professionally in each of the six recognised continental associations by FIFA.

In 2017, Mohd Faiz Subri became the first Asian to win the FIFA Puskás Award. He was awarded for his physics-defying free kick that clinched a goal during the Malaysian Super League match against Pahang at the City Stadium on 16 February 2016.

On 3 August 2021, Rafael Vitor scored the fastest goal in the Malaysia Super League when he scored a goal just 9 seconds after the opening whistle against Perak.

==== Club top scorer (since professional era) ====
Players who scored 10 or more goals are listed.

Season	Player	Goals
1995	(Scotland) John Hunter	10
1999	(Malaysia) Azman Adnan	13
2002	(Argentina) Gustavo Romero	14
2003	(Argentina) Gustavo Romero	11
2004	(Russia) Vyacheslav Melnikov	16
2005	(Brazil) José Ramirez Barreto	15
2025/2026	Dylan Wenzel-Halls	14
2013	(Malaysia) Norizam Salaman	12
2014	(South Korea) Lee Gil-hoon	17
2015	(Malaysia) Mohd Faiz Subri	10
2019	(Argentina) Julián Bottaro	10
2020	(Brazil) Casagrande	10
2021	(Brazil) Casagrande	12

- Biggest wins: 7–1 vs Negeri Sembilan (9 March 2002)
- Heaviest defeats: 0–8 vs Johor Darul Ta'zim (16 December 2023)
- Youngest ever debutant: Jafri Firdaus Chew ~ 18 years 8 months 2 days old (On 13 February 2016 vs Terengganu)
- Oldest ever player: Kipré Tchetche ~ 38 years 4 months 29 days old (On 15 May 2026 vs DPMM)
- Youngest goal scorers: Jafri Firdaus Chew ~ 20 years 4 months 17 days old (On 28 October 2017 vs Selangor)
- Oldest goal scorers: Kipré Tchetche ~ 38 years 2 months 19 days old (On 7 March 2026 vs Negeri Sembilan)

== Former players ==
The list includes those who received international caps while playing for the team, made significant contributions to the team in terms of appearances or goals, or significant contributions to the sport either before they played for the team, or after they left.

- Yeap Cheng Eng
- Aziz Ahmad
- (Scotland) Dave MacLaren
- (Malaysia) Namat Abdullah
- (Malaysia) Shaharuddin Abdullah
- (Malaysia) Mohammed Bakar
- (Malaysia) Shukor Salleh
- (Malaysia) Ali Bakar
- (Malaysia) Isa Bakar
- Desmond David
- (Malaysia) Ahmad Yusof
- (Germany) Lutz Pfannenstiel
- (Malaysia) Azman Adnan
- (Malaysia) Wan Rohaimi
- (Malaysia) Mohd Hasmawi Hassan
- (Malaysia) Chee Wan Hoe
- (Morocco) Merzagua Abderrazak
- (Malaysia) Kamarulzaman Hassan
- (Malaysia) Ooi Hoe Guan
- (Malaysia) Norizam Salaman
- (Malaysia) Faiz Subri
- (Malaysia) Yong Kuong Yong
- (Malaysia) Mafry Balang
- (Malaysia) R. Surendran
- (Malaysia) M.Yoges
- (Malaysia) Azmi Muslim
- (Malaysia) Syukur Saidin
- (Malaysia) Bobby Gonzales

== Notable players ==
As of 2026–27 season.

=== International capped players ===
AFC/OFC.: (Australia) Diogo Ferreira; (Guam) Brandon McDonald; (Hong Kong) Andy Russell; (Indonesia) Beto Gonçalves; (Indonesia) Osas Saha; (Lebanon) Hilal El-Helwe; (Lebanon) Soony Saad; (Myanmar) Zaw Min Tun; (Papua New Guinea) Nigel Dabinyaba; (Philippines) Christian Rontini; (Philippines) Curt Dizon; (Philippines) Jarvey Gayoso; (Philippines) Mark Hartmann; (Philippines) OJ Porteria; (South Korea) Kang Seung-jo; (South Korea) Lee Kil-Hoon	CAF.: (Angola) Titi Buengo; (The Gambia) Sanna Nyassi; (Nigeria) Ugo Ukah	UEFA.: (Denmark) Ken Ilsø; (Germany) Lutz Pfannenstiel	CONMEBOL/ CONCACAF.: (Haiti) Sébastien Thurière

== Managerial history ==
=== Head coaches since semi-pro era ===
Name	Period	Achievements
(Malaysia) Lim Boon Kheng	1975–1980	1976 Aga Khan Gold Cup
(Malaysia) M. Kuppan	1986–1990	1974 Malaysia Cup
(Bosnia and Herzegovina) Blagoje Bratić	1991–1993	
(Malaysia) Mohammed Bakar	1995–1996	
(Malaysia) Moey Yoke Ham	1997–1999	1998 Division 1
(Malaysia) Irfan Bakti	2000–2003	2001 Division 1; 2002 FA Cup; 2003 Charity Shield
(Malaysia) Yunus Alif	2003–2004	
(Malaysia) Norizan Bakar	2005	
(Slovakia) Joseph Herel	2006–2007	
(Malaysia) Mohammed Bakar (2)	2008	
(Malaysia) S. Veloo	2008–2009	
(Malaysia) Mohammed Bakar (3)	2010	
(Malaysia) Shukor Salleh	2010	
(Malaysia) Reduan Abdullah	2010	
(Malaysia) Robert Scully	2011	
(Malaysia) Shukor Salleh (caretaker) (2)	2011	
(Malaysia) Ahmad Yusof	2011	
(Hungary) Jánós Krécská	January 2012 – November 2012	
(Morocco) Merzagua Abderrazak	December 2012 – November 2013	2013 FAM League
(Malaysia) K. Devan	November 2013 – November 2014	
(Brazil) Jacksen F. Tiago	November 2014 – April 2016	
(Malaysia) Manzoor Azwira (caretaker)	April – May 2016	
(Croatia) Nenad Baćina	May 2016 – November 2016	
(England) Ashley Westwood	December 2016 – March 2017	
(England) Darren Read (caretaker)	March 2017	
(Malaysia) Zainal Abidin Hassan	March 2017 – October 2018	
(Malaysia) Ahmad Yusof (2)	October 2018 – March 2019	
(Malaysia) Kamal Kalid (caretaker)	March 2019	
(Malaysia) Manzoor Azwira	April 2019 – December 2020	2020 Malaysia Premier League
(Czech Republic) Tomáš Trucha	December 2020 – April 2022	
(Malaysia) Manzoor Azwira (caretaker)	May 2022	
(Malaysia) Zainal Abidin Hassan (2)	June – October 2022	
(Malaysia) Chong Yee Fatt	October 2022 – March 2023	
(Malaysia) Manzoor Azwira (caretaker) (2)	March – November 2023	
(Malaysia) Akmal Rizal	7 November 2023 – 1 November 2024	
(Malaysia) Wan Rohaimi	14 November 2024 – 1 November 2026	
(Malaysia) Victor Andrag	1 November 2026 - Present	

== Season by season record ==
=== Since professional era ===
Note:

- Pld = Played, W = Won, D = Drawn, L = Lost, F = Goals for, A = Goals against, D = Goal difference, Pts= Points, Pos = Position

1st or Champions 2nd or Runner-up 3rd place Promotion Relegation

Season	League										Cup			Asia	
Season	Division	Pld	W	D	L	F	A	D	Pts	Pos	Charity	Malaysia	FA	Competition	Result
1994	Premier League	28	4	7	17	25	64	–39	14	15th	–	Not qualified	–	–	–
1995	Premier League	28	6	6	16	29	56	–27	24	14th	–	Group stage	2nd round	–	–
1996	Premier League	28	12	5	11	37	40	–3	41	6th	–	Group stage	1st round	–	–
1997	Premier League	28	8	9	11	26	33	–7	33	11th	–	Not qualified	Runner-up	–	–
1998	Premier 1	22	12	5	5	32	23	+9	4	1st	–	Group stage	Quarter-finals	–	–
1999	Premier 1	18	6	8 (Note: Draw were followed by penalty shootouts for an additional point.)	4	22	18	+4	31	2nd	–	Group stage	2nd round	Asian Club Championship	Withdrew
2000	Premier 1	22	12	7	3	35	15	+20	43	2nd	–	Quarter-finals	Runner-up	–	–
2001	Premier 1	22	15	5	2	45	14	+31	50	1st	–	Quarter-finals	Quarter-finals	–	–
2002	Premier 1	26	13	8	5	48	31	+17	47	4th	–	Quarter-finals	Champions	Asian Club Championship	Withdrew
2003	Premier 1	24	11	3	10	29	28	+1	36	6th	Champions	Group stage	2nd round	–	–
2004	Super League	21	8	3	10	29	38	–9	27	5th	–	Quarter-finals	2nd round	–	–
2005	Super League	21	8	1	12	27	31	–4	25	6th	–	Quarter-finals	2nd round	–	–
2005–06	Super League	21	8	4	9	30	31	–1	28	6th	–	Quarter-finals	Quarter-finals	–	–
2006–07	Super League	24	6	6	12	25	36	–11	24	10th	–	Group stage	1st round	–	–
2007–08	Super League	24	4	5	15	30	49	–19	17	12th	–	Group stage	2nd round	–	–
2009	Super League	26	5	4	17	29	55	–26	19	12th	–	Group stage	2nd round	–	–
2010	Super League	26	2	4	20	10	67	–57	10	14th	–	Not qualified	1st round	–	–
2011	Premier League	22	1	1	20	14	61	–47	4	12th	–	Not qualified	1st round	–	–
2012	FAM League	16	6	0	10	20	24	–4	18	6th	–	Not qualified	1st round	–	–
2013	FAM League	20	17	1	2	53	18	+35	52	1st	–	Not qualified	2nd round	–	–
2014	Premier League	22	13	5	4	41	30	+11	44	3rd	–	Group stage	1st round	–	–
2015	Premier League	22	13	6	3	39	18	+21	45	2nd	–	Group stage	Quarter-finals	–	–
2016	Super League	22	5	7	10	32	37	–5	22	10th	–	Not qualified	2nd round	–	–
2017	Super League	22	3	3	16	16	43	–27	12	12th	–	Not qualified	3rd round	–	–
2018	Premier League	20	5	6	9	20	30	–10	21	10th	–	Group stage	3rd round	–	–
2019	Premier League	20	8	6	8	33	27	6	30	7th	–	Group stage	3rd round	–	–
2020	Premier League	11	8	2	1	24	8	16	26	1st	–	Quarter-finals^{1}	2nd round^{1}	–	–
2021	Super League	22	12	5	5	37	30	+7	41	3rd	–	Group stage	Cancelled^{1}	–	–
2022	Super League	22	2	5	15	22	45	–23	11	12th	–	Round of 16	Semi-finals	–	–
2023	Super League	26	6	6	14	29	50	–21	24	10th	–	Round of 16	Quarter-finals	–	–
2024–25	Super League	24	6	8	10	31	38	–7	26	10th	–	Round of 16	Quarter-finals	–	–
2025–26	Super League	24	6	7	11	26	41	−15	25	8th	–	Round of 16	Quarter-finals	–	–
2026–27	Super League	24									–	To be determined	Quarter-finals	–	–

Notes:'

^1 2020 Season cancelled due to the 2020 Coronavirus Pandemic.

== See also ==
- Penang Reserves
