= Aziz Ahmad (footballer) =

Malaysian footballer

Personal information
- Date of birth: 1930 (age 95–96)
- Place of birth: Penang, British Malaya
- Position: Striker

Senior career*
| Years | Team | Apps | (Gls) |
| 1950–1964 | Penang | | |

International career
- Malaya
- * Club domestic league appearances and goals

Aziz Ahmad was a Malaysian footballer who played for Penang as a striker.

== Career Overview ==
He had a successful career with Penang where he won 6 titles. He scored the winning goal when Penang defeated Singapore 3–2 in the 1953 Malaya Cup final in Ipoh. For a consecutive season, Penang defeated Singapore, this time with a scored of 3–0 in the final and Aziz scored the second goals. On 23 August 1958, Penang meet again singapore in the final and aziz scored an early lead. In replay match, Penang lifted the 1958 Malaya cup after defeated Singapore 2–0.

He was also a part of the Malaya national team that played in the first ever edition, the inaugural Pestabola Merdeka 1957.

== Personal life ==
Namat and Shaharuddin, both his nephews, were also footballers.

== Honours ==
=== Club ===
Penang

- Malaya Cup

Winners: 1953, 1954, 1958

- Malaya FAM Cup

Winners: 1955, 1956, 1957
