= János Krecska =

Hungarian footballer and coach

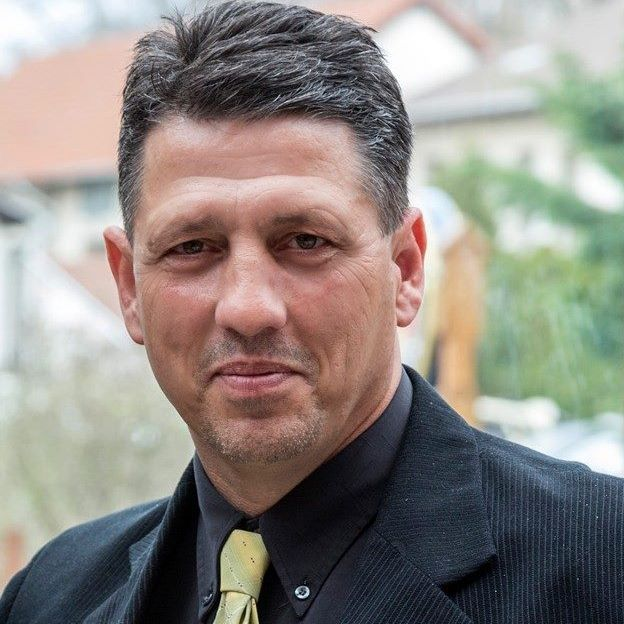
- Krecska in 2015

Personal information
- Date of birth: 28 October 1965 (age 61)
- Place of birth: Budapest, Hungary
- Position: Defender

Team information
- Current team: Sepsi OSK (technical director)

Senior career*
| Years | Team | Apps | (Gls) |
| 1982–1984 | Ferencvárosi TC | 2 | (0) |
| 1988–1995 | BKV Előre SC | | |
| 1996–1997 | III. Kerületi TVE | 30 | (2) |
| 1997–1998 | Perak FA | | |

Managerial career
- 2004–2007: BKV Előre
- 2008–2009: Arsenal Academy Kuala Lumpur
- 2010: KL Plus FC
- 2011: Perlis
- 2011–2012: Penang
- 2012–2014: Allianze University Football Academy
- 2015: Egri FC (technical director)
- 2015–2016: Gyirmót
- 2016–2017: Cegléd
- 2017–2018: Székelyföld Labdarúgó Akadémia
- 2018: FK Csíkszereda (technical director)
- 2018–: Sepsi OSK (technical director)
- * Club domestic league appearances and goals

János Krecska (born 28 October 1965) is a Hungarian former football player and coach. He has played for Ferencvárosi TC, III. Kerületi TVE and Perak FA, among his clubs during his career. His preferred playing position is as a defender.

Among his greatest achievement is helping Perak to win Malaysia Cup in 1998, together with his compatriot Laszlo Repasi. He also was part of the Ferencvaros team that finished runners up in the Hungarian league for the 1982/83 season.

After his playing career ended, he embarks on a coaching role in Hungary and Malaysia. János was the head coach of BKV Előre SC for three years before leaving the club in 2006. He has worked in Arsenal Soccer Schools Malaysia, before he was appointed as assistant coach to Mat Zan Mat Aris at KL Plus FC in 2010. When Mat Zan resigned before the start of Malaysia Cup that year, he was appointed as head coach of the club until the club resigns from Malaysia Super League before the start of 2011 season.

In April 2011, Janos was appointed head coach of Perlis FA, taking over from Salim Tofel Mohamad who is the caretaker coach after the resignation of Moshtakeen Omar on 1 March 2011. He failed to stop Perlis' slide, as the team eventually finished last in the league and were relegated to Malaysia Premier League.

He was appointed head coach of Penang FA for the 2012 Malaysia FAM League season. In 2013, he switched to coach Penang's Allianze University Football Academy, who was the Penang FA sponsor in the 2012 season.

Since 2015 he has returned to his native Hungary to coach several clubs there.
