= Shaharuddin Abdullah =

Malaysian footballer (1948–2023)

Personal information
- Date of birth: 28 August 1948
- Place of birth: Penang, Federation of Malaya
- Date of death: 28 December 2023 (aged 75)
- Place of death: Taiping, Perak, Malaysia
- Positions: Attacking midfielder; striker

Youth career
- 1964–1967: Penang FA

Senior career*
Years	Team	Apps	(Gls)
1967–1969	Penang		
1970–1973	Penjara FC		
1974–1982	Penang		

International career
1967–1974	Malaysia	70	(39)
- * Club domestic league appearances and goals

Shaharuddin Abdullah (28 August 1948 – 28 December 2023) was a Malaysian footballer. He was once one of the most feared strikers in the country, known as "Harimau Malaysia" because of his ability to score goals. He once scored 15 goals for Malaysia in the Merdeka Cup which stood as a record for a very long time. His father, Abdullah Mohammad, was a goalkeeper for Penang in the 1950s. He was a part of the Malaysian squad at the 1972 Summer Olympics.

== Career ==
Abdullah started to play football when he was nine years old. He used the Marin Sg. Gelugor field near his house to learn football skills. He helped his school, Sekolah Kebangsaan Sungai Gelugor, to win the district and inter-school championships.

In 1964 when he was 16 years old, he was selected to play for the Penang Burnley Cup team along with his brother, Namat Abdullah, Ali Bakar, Mohammed Bakar, Khalil Hashim, Cha Peng Chiang, Yap Kim Kok and N Baskaran.

Abdullah played for Malaysia in the 1972 Munich Olympics. Shaharuddin played in all three group games and scored in the 3–0 win against the United States. Overall he made 70 appearances and scored 39 international goals for Malaysia.

In 2004, he was inducted in Olympic Council of Malaysia's Hall of Fame for 1972 Summer Olympics football team.

== Personal life ==
Namat Abdullah, his brother also played for Penang and together with his uncle, Aziz Ahmad. Shaharuddin's son, Shafiq Shaharudin, is also a professional footballer.

Shaharuddin Abdullah died on 28 December 2023, at the age of 75.

== Career statistics ==
=== International ===
Scores and results list Malaysia's goal tally first, score column indicates score after each Abdullah goal.

List of international goals scored by Shaharuddin Abdullah
No.	Date	Venue	Opponent	Score	Result	Competition	Ref.
1	14 August 1968	Perak Stadium, Ipoh, Malaysia	South Vietnam	—	4-0	1968 Merdeka Tournament	
2	25 August 1968	Merdeka Stadium, Kuala Lumpur, Malaysia	Burma	—	3-0	1968 Merdeka Tournament	
3	30 October 1969	Merdeka Stadium, Kuala Lumpur, Malaysia	Thailand	1-0	1-0	1969 Merdeka Tournament	
4	3 November 1969	Merdeka Stadium, Kuala Lumpur, Malaysia	Indonesia	—	1-3	1969 Merdeka Tournament	
5	7 November 1969	Merdeka Stadium, Kuala Lumpur, Malaysia	Burma	—	3-1	1969 Merdeka Tournament	
6	7 November 1969	Merdeka Stadium, Kuala Lumpur, Malaysia	Burma	—	3-1	1969 Merdeka Tournament	
7	9 November 1969	Merdeka Stadium, Kuala Lumpur, Malaysia	Indonesia	—	2-3	1969 Merdeka Tournament	
8	19 November 1969	Bangkok, Thailand	Thailand	—	2-2	1969 King's Cup	
9	7 December 1969	Bogyoke Aung San Stadium, Yangon, Myanmar	Laos	—	2-1	1969 SEAP Games	
10	8 December 1969	Bogyoke Aung San Stadium, Yangon, Myanmar	South Vietnam	—	2-1	1969 SEAP Games	
11	4 August 1970	Merdeka Stadium, Kuala Lumpur, Malaysia	Taiwan	—	3-1	1970 Merdeka Tournament	
12	4 August 1970	Merdeka Stadium, Kuala Lumpur, Malaysia	Taiwan	—	3-1	1970 Merdeka Tournament	
13	9 November 1970	Bangkok, Thailand	Khmer Republic	1-0	1-1	1970 King's Cup	
14	20 November 1970	Bangkok, Thailand	Indonesia	1-0	3-1	1970 King's Cup	
15	20 November 1970	Bangkok, Thailand	Indonesia	2-0	3-1	1970 King's Cup	
16	20 November 1970	Bangkok, Thailand	Indonesia	—	3-1	1970 King's Cup	
17	22 May 1971	Bangkok, Thailand	Brunei	3-0	8-0	1972 AFC Asian Cup qualification	
18	22 May 1971	Bangkok, Thailand	Brunei	5-0	8-0	1972 AFC Asian Cup qualification	
19	22 May 1971	Bangkok, Thailand	Brunei	8-0	8-0	1972 AFC Asian Cup qualification	
20	28 May 1971	Bangkok, Thailand	Hong Kong	—	2-1	1972 AFC Asian Cup qualification	
21	28 May 1971	Bangkok, Thailand	Hong Kong	—	2-1	1972 AFC Asian Cup qualification	
22	8 November 1971	Bangkok, Thailand	South Korea	—	2-2	1971 King's Cup	
23	12 December 1971	Merdeka Stadium, Kuala Lumpur, Malaysia	Laos	—	5-0	1971 SEAP Games	
24	14 December 1971	Merdeka Stadium, Kuala Lumpur, Malaysia	Thailand	—	4-2	1971 SEAP Games	
25	14 December 1971	Merdeka Stadium, Kuala Lumpur, Malaysia	Thailand	—	4-2	1971 SEAP Games	
26	17 December 1971	Merdeka Stadium, Kuala Lumpur, Malaysia	South Vietnam	1-2	3-2	1971 SEAP Games	
27	17 December 1971	Merdeka Stadium, Kuala Lumpur, Malaysia	South Vietnam	2-2	3-2	1971 SEAP Games	
28	17 December 1971	Merdeka Stadium, Kuala Lumpur, Malaysia	South Vietnam	3-2	3-2	1971 SEAP Games	
29	18 December 1971	Merdeka Stadium, Kuala Lumpur, Malaysia	Burma	1-1	1-2	1971 SEAP Games	
30	12 July 1972	Merdeka Stadium, Kuala Lumpur, Malaysia	Sri Lanka	2-0	4-1	1972 Merdeka Tournament	
31	12 July 1972	Merdeka Stadium, Kuala Lumpur, Malaysia	Sri Lanka	3-0	4-1	1972 Merdeka Tournament	
32	12 July 1972	Merdeka Stadium, Kuala Lumpur, Malaysia	Sri Lanka	4-0	4-1	1972 Merdeka Tournament	
33	19 July 1972	Perak Stadium, Ipoh, Malaysia	Khmer Republic	—	6-1	1972 Merdeka Tournament	
34	19 July 1972	Perak Stadium, Ipoh, Malaysia	Khmer Republic	—	6-1	1972 Merdeka Tournament	
35	22 July 1972	Merdeka Stadium, Kuala Lumpur, Malaysia	Japan	2-1	3-1	1972 Merdeka Tournament	
36	22 July 1972	Merdeka Stadium, Kuala Lumpur, Malaysia	Japan	3-1	3-1	1972 Merdeka Tournament	
37	29 August 1972	ESV-Stadion, Ingolstadt, Germany	United States	—	3-0	1972 Summer Olympics	
38	28 September 1972	Dongdaemun Stadium, Seoul, South Korea	Indonesia	1-0	1-3	1972 President's Cup	
39	23 May 1973	Dongdaemun Stadium, Seoul, South Korea	Thailand	1-0	2-0	1974 FIFA World Cup qualification	

== Honours ==
Penang

- Burnley Cup: 1964–65, 1966
- Malaysia Kings Gold Cup: 1966, 1968, 1969
- Malaysia Cup: 1974

Penjara

- Malaysia FAM Cup: 1970, 1971, 1973

Malaysia

- Bronze medal Asian Games: 1974
- Kings Cup: 1972
- Merdeka Tournament: 1968, 1973, 1974
