= Order of precedence in Penang =

Relative preeminence of officials for ceremonial purposes

The Penang order of precedence is a nominal and symbolic hierarchy of important positions within the state of Penang. It has no legal standing but is used to dictate ceremonial protocol at events of a state nature.

== Order of precedence ==
Order of precedence in Penang is as follows:

No.	Description
1	The King
2	The Queen
3	The Governor
4	The Governor's spouse
5	Rulers and their spouses
6	Regents
7	Governors of other States and their spouses
8	Prime Minister
9	Deputy Prime Minister
10	Chief Minister
11	Crown Princes and heirs of states
12	Rulers' representatives
13	Former Governors (ordered by departure from office): 1. Abdul Rahman Abbas (30 April 2021)
14	Former Chief Ministers (ordered by departure from office): 1. Koh Tsu Koon (11 March 2008); 2. Lim Guan Eng (14 May 2018)
15	Grand Commanders of the Most Distinguished Order of the Defender of the Realm (SMN)
16	Grand Commanders of the Distinguished Order of Loyalty to the Crown of Malaysia (SSM)
17	Grand Commanders of the Order of the Defender of State (DUPN)
18	Chief Justice
19	President of the Senate
20	Speaker of the House of Representatives
21	Chief Ministers of other States
22	Deputy Chief Ministers
23	Federal Ministers
24	Chief Secretary to the Government
25	High Commissioners, Ambassador and Chargé d'Affaires
26	Chief Judge of Malaya
27	Speaker of the Legislative Assembly
28	Judges of the High Court
29	Judicial Commissioners
30	State Secretary
31	Members of the Executive Council
32	State Legal Adviser
33	State Financial Officer
34	State Mufti
35	Commanders of the Order of the Defender of State (DGPN)
36	Deputy President of the Senate; Deputy Speakers of the House of Representatives; Federal Deputy Ministers; Deputy Chief Ministers of other States
37	Parliamentary Secretaries
38	Ministers of States of Sabah and Sarawak, and Members of other State Executive Councils
39	Members of the Legislative Assembly
40	Senators
41	Members of the House of Representatives
42	Members of other State Legislative Assemblies
43	Foreign consuls in the State
44	Commander of the 2nd Division
45	State Chief Police
46	Companions of the Order of the Defender of State (DMPN)
47	Officers of the Order of the Defender of State (DSPN)
48	Senior Federal and State Government Officers in the State
49	Members of the Order of the Defender of State (DJN)
50	Members of the Distinguished Service Star (BCN)
51	Justices of the Peace

== See also ==
- List of post-nominal letters (Penang)
