= Chia Boon Leong =

Singaporean footballer (1925–2022)

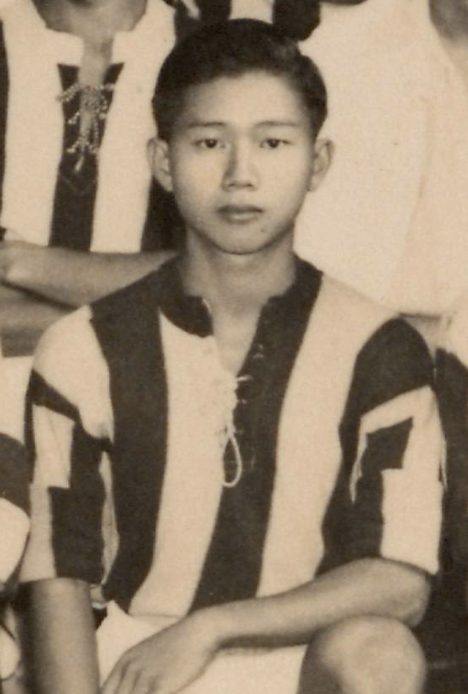
Chia in 1943

Chia Boon Leong (simplified Chinese: 谢文龙; traditional Chinese: 謝文龍, 1 January 1925 – 20 December 2022) was a Singaporean footballer who competed for China in the 1948 Summer Olympics and for Singapore at the 1954 Asian Games. He was known as "twinkletoes" in the football scene.

== Early life and education ==
Chia was born on 1 January 1925 to philanthropist Chia Yew Siang. He grew up in Pasir Panjang, Singapore. Chia attended Pasir Panjang English School and Raffles Institution.

During World War II and the Japanese occupation of Singapore, Chia studied at a Japanese school in Queen Street in late 1942.

== Career ==
Chia was a founding member of the Pasir Panjang Rovers.

In mid-1943, Chia worked in a telegraphy company, where his work consists of sending and receiving messages in morse code. Every day after work, he would go to Jalan Besar Stadium to play football for the Pasir Panjang Rovers. Chia was also part of a Syonan team that travelled to Malaya to play against the state teams.

In 1948, Chia, alongside Yeap Cheng Eng and Chu Chee Seng, as Malayan Chinese represented China at football team at the 1948 Summer Olympics held at London, England.

In December 1951, Chia played in a friendly match for Singapore against Swedish club IFK Göteborg. He was praised by the coach, former England international football player, John Mahon, who told his team to “watch that little fellow with the twinkling feet, he works hard, dribbles hard and is outstanding both in attack and defence”. This resulted in Chia being nicknamed "twinkletoes".

== Death ==
Chia died on 20 December 2022, at the age of 97.
