= Namat Abdullah =

Malaysian footballer (1946–2020)

Personal information
- Full name: Namat Abdullah
- Date of birth: 30 March 1946
- Place of birth: Butterworth, Seberang Perai, Penang, Malaysia
- Date of death: 17 December 2020 (aged 74)
- Place of death: Kamunting, Perak, Malaysia
- Position: Full-back

Youth career
- 1964–1966: Penang FA

Senior career*
Years	Team	Apps	(Gls)
1967–1969	Penang FA	??	(?)
1970–1973	Penjara FC	??	(?)
1974–1977	Penang FA	??	(?)

International career
1967–1975	Malaysia	95	(7)
- * Club domestic league appearances and goals

Dato' Namat Abdullah DSPN AMN (30 March 1946 – 17 December 2020) was a Malaysian footballer. He was a part of the Malaysian squad at the 1972 Summer Olympics. On 17 September 2014, FourFourTwo he was listed among the top 25 Malaysian footballers of all time.

== Career overview ==
He was born in Butterworth, Penang. Namat played as a striker when he helped Penang won the Burnley Cup in 1965 before playing as a right-back. Namat featured for the Malaysian national team in the 1972 Munich Olympics football competition, playing all three group games. He also played for Malaysia in the 1974 World Cup qualifying matches. For a period, Namat was captain of Penang FA. He led Penang to a 2–1 victory in 1974 Malaysia Cup final against Perak.

On 11 May 1975, Namat was also part of the Malaysia Selection that played against Arsenal FC in a friendly match which his team won by 2–0 at Merdeka Stadium.

During his international career, Namat went on to play a total of 115 matches for Malaysia (including non-FIFA 'A' international matches). Against other nations' national 'A' teams, he had total of 95 caps.

== After retirement ==
For his contribution to Malay football community in Penang state as a community coaches, he was awarded Maal Hijrah Sports Figure by Penang Malay Association in 2003.

== Personal life ==
Shahruddin Abdullah, his brother also played for Penang and together with his uncle, Aziz Ahmad.

== Death ==
He died at his son-in-law's residence in Taiping, Perak, Malaysia at 74 after a long battle with intestinal cancer at 5.30 pm on 17 December 2020. His body was brought to his residence in Taman Peruda, Sungai Petani the same day and his funeral was held at 9 pm the following day on 18 December 2020.

== Career statistics ==
=== International ===
Scores and results list Malaysia's goal tally first, score column indicates score after each Namat goal.

List of international goals scored by Namat Abdullah
No.	Date	Venue	Opponent	Score	Result	Competition	Ref.
1	23 December 1969	Bangkok, Thailand	Laos	—	1-1	1969 King's Cup	
2	15 August 1970	Merdeka Stadium, Kuala Lumpur, Malaysia	Indonesia	—	4-0	1970 Merdeka Tournament	
3	8 May 1971	Seoul, South Korea	Thailand	—	4-1	1971 President's Cup Football Tournament	
4	13 May 1971	Seoul, South Korea	Indonesia	—	2-4	1971 President's Cup Football Tournament	
5	14 December 1971	Merdeka Stadium, Kuala Lumpur, Malaysia	Thailand	—	4-2	1971 SEAP Games	
6	4 August 1973	Merdeka Stadium, Kuala Lumpur, Malaysia	India	—	4-0	1973 Merdeka Tournament	
7	10 August 1973	Merdeka Stadium, Kuala Lumpur, Malaysia	Burma	—	2-1	1973 Merdeka Tournament	

== Honours ==
Penang

- Burnley Cup: 1964/65, 1966
- Malaysia Kings Gold Cup: 1966, 1968, 1969
- Malaysia Cup: 1974
- Aga Khan Gold Cup: 1976

Penjara

- Malaysia FAM Cup: 1970, 1971, 1973

Malaysia

- Bronze medal Asian Games: 1974
- Kings Cup: 1972
- Merdeka Tournament: 1968, 1973, 1974

Individual

- OCM Hall of Fame - 1972 Summer Olympics football team: 2004
- Goal.com The best Malaysia XI of all time: 2020
- IFFHS Men's All Time Malaysia Dream Team: 2022

=== Orders ===
- Malaysia :
  - Member of the Order of the Defender of the Realm (AMN) (1975)
- Penang :
  - Officer of the Order of the Defender of State (DSPN) – Dato' (2011)
