= Mun Ki-nam =

North Korean footballer (1948–2025)

Personal information
- Date of birth: 1948
- Place of birth: Chongju, North Pyongan, North Korea
- Date of death: 9 August 2025 (aged 77)
- Height: 1.73 m (5 ft 8 in)
- Position: Forward

Senior career*
Years	Team	Apps	(Gls)
1965–1976	Rodongja		
- Unpasan

International career
1965	North Korea U20		
1969–1979	North Korea		

Managerial career
- Unpasan
- 1990: North Korea U20
- 1991: Korea U20 (assistant)
- North Korea women
- 1999–2000: North Korea
- 2005–2009: University of Ulsan
- 2010–: Ulsan College women
- * Club domestic league appearances and goals

- Mun Ki-nam
- Hangul: 문기남
- Hanja: 文基男
- RR: Mun Ginam
- MR: Mun Kinam

Mun Ki-nam (Korean: 문기남; 1948 – 9 August 2025) was a South Korean football player and manager. Mun was born in North Korea but defected to South Korea in 2004.

== Early life ==
Born in Chongju, North Pyongan, the details of Mun's childhood are unclear. In a 2004 interview with The Dong-a Ilbo, Mun states that his father defected to South Korea during the Korean War, and that this had a negative impact on his life growing up in The North. He also stated that part of the reason for his defection to The South was to find his father, as well as his uncles. However, in another 2014 interview with Seoul Shinmun, he states that his father was executed for opposing the Communist Party when Mun was three years old.

Regardless, Mun moved to the capital Pyongyang at some point during his youth, either living with his mother and her new husband, or with his mother-in law.

After the Korean axe murder incident of 1976, people deemed "dangerous elements" were forced to relocate from major North Korean cities to the countryside, including Mun.

== Playing career ==
Mun represented the North Korea national team between 1969 and 1979. He was also called up for North Korea at the 1974 Asian Games.

== Managerial career ==
Mun began his managerial career by coaching the North Korea under-20 national team at the 1990 AFC Youth Championship. He also served as a coach of the unified Korea team at the 1991 FIFA World Youth Championship.

== Defection and later life ==
After working at the DPR Korea Football Association's office in Gyeonggi, Mun defected to South Korea via China in January 2004 with his wife and four children. He went on to manage the University of Ulsan football team.

Mun died on 9 August 2025, at the age of 77.
