= Unpasan Sports Club =

Unpasan 은파산
- Full name: Unpasan Sports Club 은파산체육단
- League: DPR Korea League

- Unpasan Sports Club
- Chosŏn'gŭl: 은파산체육단
- Hancha: 銀波山體育團
- Revised Romanization: Eunpasan cheyukdan
- McCune–Reischauer: Ŭnp'asan ch'eyuktan

Unpasan Sports Club (Korean: 은파산체육단) is a North Korean football club that plays in the DPR Korea League, the highest football soccer league in North Korea.

It is named after Unpasan (Unpa Mountain), a mountain in Ryongjŏng-ri, Pyoksong County, South Hwanghae Province. It participated in the 1996 Mangyongdae prize sports football competition.
