= Yeap Cheng Eng =

Chinese footballer (1915–1994)

Personal information
- Date of birth: 1915
- Place of birth: British Malaya
- Date of death: 14 January 1994 (aged 78–79)
- Position: Left winger

Senior career*
Years	Team	Apps	(Gls)
1934–1958	Penang		

International career
- Malaya
- China
- * Club domestic league appearances and goals

Yeap Cheng Eng
- Traditional Chinese: 葉清榮
- Simplified Chinese: 叶清荣
Transcriptions
Standard Mandarin
- Hanyu Pinyin: Yè Qīngróng
Yue: Cantonese
- Jyutping: Jip6 Cing1 Wing4
Southern Min
- Hokkien POJ: Ia̍p Chheng-êng
- Tâi-lô: Ia̍p Tshing-îng

Yeap Cheng Eng (1915 – 14 January 1994) was a Chinese footballer. He was the first Malayan ever to participate in the Olympic Games, when he was a member of the football team which represented the China as a guest players in the 1948 Olympic Games in London.

In Malayan domestic football, he represented Penang for a record 24 years and was their captain for many years, winning the Malaya Cup in 1953, 1954, and 1958 (at the age of 42).
