= Fadhel Abbas =

Iraqi footballer (born 1951)

Personal information
- Full name: Fadhel Abbas
- Date of birth: 3 June 1951 (age 75)
- Place of birth: Iraq
- Date of death: January 19, 2025
- Height: 1.81 m (5 ft 11 in)
- Position: Goalkeeper

Senior career*
Years	Team	Apps	(Gls)
- Al-Tijara SC

International career
1974-1975	Iraq		
- * Club domestic league appearances and goals

Fadhel Abbas (Arabic: فَاضِل عَبَّاس; born 3 June 1951) is a former Iraqi football goalkeeper who played for Iraq in the 1974 Asian Games. He played for Iraq from 1974 to 1975.

== Family ==
=== Wife ===
• Setota Ali Qassim

=== Children ===
• Hanadi Fadhel Abbas (1976)

• Hiba Fadhel Abbas (1980)

• Hamsa Fadhel Abbas (1986)

• Mustafa Fadhel Abbas (1988)

• Abbas Fadhel Abbas (1989)
