= Wong Foo Wah =

Malaysian sports shooter

Personal information
- Born: 15 September 1927 Singapore, Straits Settlements

Sport
- Sport: Sports shooting

Wong Foo Wah (born 15 September 1927) is a Malaysian former sports shooter. He competed at the 1964 Summer Olympics and the 1972 Summer Olympics. He also competed at the 1966 Asian Games.
