= Qaisar Hameed =

Iraqi footballer

Personal information
- Full name: Qaisar Hameed Khazal
- Date of birth: 1 July 1950 (age 76)
- Place of birth: Iraq
- Position: Midfielder

Senior career*
Years	Team	Apps	(Gls)
- Al-Quwa Al-Jawiya

International career
1970–1975	Iraq		
- * Club domestic league appearances and goals

Qaisar Hameed (born 1 July 1950) is a former Iraqi football midfielder who played for Iraq in the 1974 Asian Games. He played for Iraq between 1970 and 1975
