= Qusay Qasim =

Iraqi footballer

Personal information
- Full name: Qusay Qasim Hashim
- Date of birth: 1 July 1947 (age 79)
- Place of birth: Iraq
- Position: Defender

Senior career*
| Years | Team | Apps | (Gls) |
- Al-Quwa Al-Jawiya

International career
| 1974-1975 | Iraq | | |
- * Club domestic league appearances and goals

Qusay Qasim (born 1 July 1947) is a former Iraqi footballer who played for Iraq in the 1974 Asian Games. He played for Iraq from 1974 to 1975.
