= Toshio Takabayashi =

Japanese footballer

Toshio Takabayashi 高林 敏夫
Personal information
- Full name: Toshio Takabayashi
- Date of birth: November 15, 1953 (age 72)
- Place of birth: Japan
- Height: 1.75 m (5 ft 9 in)
- Position: Forward

Youth career
- 1969–1971: Sagami Institute of Technology High School
- 1972–1975: Chuo University

Senior career*
| Years | Team | Apps | (Gls) |
| 1976–1982 | Hitachi | 79 | (10) |
| Total | | 79 | (10) |

International career
| 1974–1976 | Japan | 12 | (2) |
Medal record
Hitachi
| Runner-up | Japan Soccer League | 1982 |
| Winner | JSL Cup | 1976 |
| Runner-up | JSL Cup | 1980 |
- * Club domestic league appearances and goals

Toshio Takabayashi (高林 敏夫, Takabayashi Toshio; born November 15, 1953) is a former Japanese football player. He played for Japan national team.

== Club career ==
Takabayashi was born on November 15, 1953. After graduating from Chuo University, he joined Hitachi in 1976. The club won 1976 JSL Cup. He retired in 1982. He played 79 games and scored 10 goals in the league.

== National team career ==
On February 12, 1974, when Takabayashi was a Chuo University student, he debuted and scored a goal for Japan national team against Singapore. In September, he was selected Japan for 1974 Asian Games. He also played at 1976 Summer Olympics qualification. He played 12 games and scored 2 goals for Japan until 1976.

== Club statistics ==
| Club performance | | | League | |
| Season | Club | League | Apps | Goals |
| Japan | | | League | |
|---|---|---|---|---|
| 1976 | Hitachi | JSL Division 1 | 14 | 2 |
| 1977 | Hitachi | JSL Division 1 | 12 | 5 |
| 1978 | Hitachi | JSL Division 1 | 7 | 0 |
| 1979 | Hitachi | JSL Division 1 | 15 | 0 |
| 1980 | Hitachi | JSL Division 1 | 13 | 2 |
| 1981 | Hitachi | JSL Division 1 | 10 | 0 |
| 1982 | Hitachi | JSL Division 1 | 8 | 1 |
| Total | | | 79 | 10 |

== National team statistics ==
Japan national team
| Year | Apps | Goals |
|---|---|---|
| 1974 | 4 | 1 |
| 1975 | 0 | 0 |
| 1976 | 8 | 1 |
| Total | 12 | 2 |
