= Ali Bakar =

Malaysian footballer

Personal information
- Date of birth: 18 November 1947
- Place of birth: Penang, British Malaya
- Date of death: 16 August 2003 (aged 55)
- Position: Midfielder

Youth career
- 1964–1967: Penang FA

Senior career*
| Years | Team | Apps | (Gls) |
| 1968–1976 | Penang FA | | |

International career
| 1970–1976 | Malaysia | | |
- * Club domestic league appearances and goals

Ali Bakar (18 November 1947 – 16 August 2003) was a football player who represented the Malaysian national football team from 1970 until 1976. He played for Penang FA in Malaysia's domestic competition. He was the flag bearer for Malaysia at the 1972 Summer Olympics.

== Career overview ==
A midfielder, Ali was a squad player for the Malaysia team in the 1972 Munich Olympics football competition, and also represented Malaysia when it finished third in the 1974 Asian Games in Iran. Also in 1974, he was part of the Malaysia Cup-winning Penang side. After two years, he also helped Penang side to win the international tournament, Aga Khan Gold Cup held in Dhaka.

== Personal life ==
Ali's brother, Isa Bakar, was a football player, also playing for Penang and Malaysia.

Ali suffered a heart attack and died on the field while playing in a charity football match in Singapore on 16 August 2003. His body was buried in Penang. In 2004, he was inducted in Olympic Council of Malaysia's Hall of Fame for 1972 Summer Olympics football team.

== Honours ==
Penang

- Burnley Cup: 1966
- Malaysia Kings Gold Cup: 1966, 1968, 1969
- Malaysia Cup: 1974
- Aga Khan Gold Cup: 1976

Malaysia

- Bronze medal Asian Games: 1974
- Kings Cup: 1972
- Merdeka Cup: 1974, 1976
- Jakarta Anniversary Tournament: 1970

== See also ==
- List of association footballers who died while playing
