= List of post-nominal letters (Penang) =

Honorific order of the Governor of Pulau Pinang

This is a list of post-nominal letters used in Penang. The order in which they follow an individual's name is the same as the order of precedence for the wearing of order insignias, decorations, and medals. When applicable, non-hereditary titles are indicated.

| Grades | | Post-nominal | Title | Wife's Title | Ribbon |
|---|---|---|---|---|---|
Order of the Defender of State - Darjah Pangkuan Negeri
| Grand Principal | Darjah Utama Pangkuan Negeri | D.U.P.N. | Dato' Seri Utama | Datin Seri Utama | |
| Grand Commander | Darjah Panglima Pangkuan Negeri | D.P.P.N. | Dato' Seri | Datin Seri | |
| Commander | Darjah Gemilang Pangkuan Negeri | D.G.P.N. | Dato' Seri | Datin Seri | |
| Companion | Darjah Yang Mulia Pangkuan Negeri | D.M.P.N. | Dato' | Datin | |
| Lieutenant | Darjah Setia Pangkuan Negeri | D.S.P.N. | Dato' | Datin | |
| Member | Darjah Johan Negeri | D.J.N. | -- | -- | |
Distinguished Service Star - Bintang Cemerlang Negeri
| Recipient | Bintang Cemerlang Negeri | B.C.N. | -- | -- | |
Conspicuous Gallantry Medal - Pingat Gagah Perwira
| Recipient | Pingat Gagah Perwira | P.G.P. | -- | -- | |
Distinguished Conduct Medal - Pingat Kelakuan Terpuji
| Recipient | Pingat Kelakuan Terpuji | P.K.T. | -- | -- | |
Meritorious Service Medal - Pingat Jasa Kebaktian
| Recipient | Pingat Jasa Kebaktian | P.J.K. | -- | -- | |
Community Service Medal - Pingat Jasa Masyarakat
| Recipient | Pingat Jasa Masyarakat | P.J.M. | -- | -- | |
Loyal Service Medal - Pingat Bakti Setia
| Recipient | Pingat Bakti Setia | P.B.S. | -- | -- | |

Precedence:

| 1. | Darjah Utama Pangkuan Negeri | D.U.P.N. | Dato' Seri Utama |
| 2. | Darjah Panglima Pangkuan Negeri | D.P.P.N. | Dato' Seri |
| 3. | Darjah Gemilang Pangkuan Negeri | D.G.P.N. | Dato' Seri |
| 4. | Darjah Yang Mulia Pangkuan Negeri | D.M.P.N. | Dato' |
| 5. | Darjah Setia Pangkuan Negeri | D.S.P.N. | Dato' |
| 6. | Darjah Johan Negeri | D.J.N. | -- |
| 7. | Bintang Cemerlang Negeri | B.C.N. | -- |
| 8. | Pingat Gagah Pewira | P.G.P. | -- |
| 9. | Pingat Kelakuan Terpuji | P.K.T. | -- |
| 10. | Pingat Jasa Kebaktian | P.J.K. | -- |
| 11. | Pingat Jasa Masyarakat | P.J.M. | -- |
| 12. | Pingat Bakti Setia | P.B.S. | -- |
| 13. | Justice of the Peace | J.P. | -- |

== See also ==
- Order of precedence in Penang
