= Burnley Cup =

- Founded: 1962; 64 years ago
- Country: Malaysia
- Confederation: AFC

Burnley Cup or Piala Razak was a youth football competition for under-19 players in Malaysia.

== History ==
On 25 January 1961, Mr.Choo Seng Quee, Malaya national football team coach departed to England to study football training techniques. That trip was made under a personal arrangement by FAM president Tunku Abdul Rahman with a British Council bursary. When Mr. Choo Seng Que arrived in England, he was sent by the English Football Association as guests to Burnley F.C. and Sheffield F.C. After a six-month coaching course in England, on 14 June 1961 when he was about to return to Malaya, he was awarded two trophies to be given to the FAM to hold local football tournaments for youths; the Burnley Cup for under-19 and the Sheffield Cup for under-15.

In 1973, the Burnley Cup tournament was replaced by the Razak Cup (Malay:Piala Razak), after Tun Abdul Razak, former FAM President and Malaysia Prime Minister. The tournament is now known as the President's Cup.

== The missing cup ==
Efforts have been made to locate the Burnley Cup as FAM admitted that they have not seen the youth trophy since it was last won in 1972. While earlier guesses was the trophy could be with the last tournament winner (at first assumed to be with the state of Sarawak), a senior journalist refuted that assumption by sharing a complete set of statistics on past results of the Burnley Cup. The final edition of the Under-19 tournament was said to be held in Sultan Nasiruddin Shah Stadium in Kuala Terengganu, where Terengganu and Penang were both declared joint winners after a tie.

Despite the new leads, FAM was still unable to trace its whereabouts, with insiders suggesting the trophy could be with the Museums Department. However, based on the museum's records, the Burnley Cup was never gifted to them, and only the HMS Malaya Cup was given to their custody in 1968.

Datuk Yap Nyim Keong, the Selangor skipper whose team won the cup in 1970, as well as a former FAM assistant secretary, said a trophy would generally be retained by the winning team before it was returned to the organisers for the following editions.

== Tournament results ==
The following results was compiled by senior journalist Devinder Singh.

Year	Champions	Runners-up	Score	Venues
1962	Selangor	Perak	4–2	Stadium Merdeka, Kuala Lumpur
1963	Selangor	Singapore	3-1	Stadium Merdeka, Kuala Lumpur
1964	Selangor	Singapore	3–2	Jalan Besar Stadium, Singapore
1964/1965	Penang	Perak	3–1	Stadium Merdeka, Kuala Lumpur
1965	Selangor	Perak	2–0	Perak Stadium, Ipoh
1966	Penang & Selangor (joint winners)		2–2	City Stadium, George Town
1967	No tournament			
1968	Perak	Selangor	2–1	Stadium Merdeka, Kuala Lumpur
1968/1969	Perak	Selangor	2–0	Darulaman Stadium, Kedah
1969	Sabah & Selangor (joint winners)		1–1	Kubu Stadium, Melaka
1970	Selangor	Perak	1-0	Station Padang, Seremban
1971	Perak	Terengganu	1-0	Jubilee Ground, Kuching
1972	Terengganu & Penang (joint winners)		2–2	Sultan Ismail Nasiruddin Shah Stadium, Terengganu

== See also ==
- Borneo Cup
