= India women's national football team results (1980–1989) =

This article lists the results of India women's national football team from 1980 to 1989.

== Legend ==
Win Draw Loss

Until the 1990s, the Indian women's national team was controlled by the Women Football Federation of India (WFFI), which was affiliated to Asian Ladies' Football Confederation (ALFC), neither of which were affiliated to AFC or FIFA. Due to this, FIFA refused to recognize the international matches played by the team from 1975 to 1994.

== 1980 ==
11 January AFC Women C	India S	2–0	Western Australia	Calicut, India
	Shanti Mullick 17'; Shukla Dutta 27'	Report		Stadium: Calicut EMS Stadium; Attendance: 25,000

12 January AFC Women C	India S	2–0	Hong Kong	Calicut, India
	Yolanda de Sousa 7'; ? 12' (o.g.)	Report		Stadium: Calicut EMS Stadium; Attendance: 30,000

15 January AFC Women C	Taiwan	0–0	India S	Calicut, India
		Report		Stadium: Calicut EMS Stadium; Attendance: 15,500

16 January AFC Women C	India N	0–1	India S	Calicut, India
		Report	Shukla Dutta 59'	Stadium: Calicut EMS Stadium; Attendance: 45,050

18 January AFC Women C	Malaysia	0–0	India S	Calicut, India
		Report		Stadium: Calicut EMS Stadium; Attendance: 25,520

19 January AFC Women C SF	India S	3–1	Hong Kong	Calicut, India
	Shukla Dutta; Sushma Das; Yolanda de Sousa	Report	Poon Shui-Chun	Stadium: Calicut EMS Stadium; Attendance: 50,000

20 January AFC Women C F	Taiwan	2–0	India S	Calicut, India
	Chuang Haiu-li 15'; Yang Hsiou-Chih 55'	Report		Stadium: Calicut EMS Stadium; Attendance: 65,200

At the 1980 Asian Cup India placed two teams. In the original fixture list, the two Indian teams were labelled "India A" and "India B". They were relabelled as India Senior ("India S") and India Novice ("India N"), other version called "India North" and "India South."

== 1981 ==
8 June AFC Women C	India	5–0	Singapore	Mong Kok, Hong Kong
	Shanti Mullick; Shukla Dutta			Stadium: Mong Kok Stadium; Attendance: 3,427

10 June AFC Women C	India	8–0	Philippines	Mong Kok, Hong Kong
	Shukia Nag; Shanti Mullick; Socorina Pereira; Kuntala Ghosh			Stadium: Mong Kok Stadium

12 June AFC Women C	Hong Kong	0–0	India	Mong Kok, Hong Kong
				Stadium: Mong Kok Stadium; Attendance: 1,200

15 June AFC Women C SF	Thailand	1–0	India	So Kon Po, Hong Kong
	Budsara Rungsawai 50'			Stadium: Hong Kong Stadium; Attendance: 9,956

17 June AFC Women C 3rdP	Hong Kong	0–2	India	So Kon Po, Hong Kong
			Shukla Dutta 25'; Socorina Pereira 51'	Stadium: Hong Kong Stadium; Attendance: 16,969

== 1983 ==
10 April AFC Women C	India	5–0	Philippines	Bangkok, Thailand
	Shanti Mullick 3', 20' (?); Shukla Dutta			Stadium: National Stadium

11 April AFC Women C	India	1–0	Hong Kong	Bangkok, Thailand
	Shanti Mullick 13'			Stadium: National Stadium

12 April AFC Women C	India	3–0	Malaysia	Bangkok, Thailand
	Shanti Mullick 23', 30'; Shukla Dutta			Stadium: National Stadium

14 April AFC Women C	Thailand	2–1	India	Bangkok, Thailand
	Yapidee Chaisawad; Wannipha Yeepracha		Shanti Mullick 10'	Stadium: National Stadium

15 April AFC Women C	India	1–0	Singapore	Bangkok, Thailand
	Shanti Mullick 11' (pen.)			Stadium: National Stadium

17 April AFC Women C F	Thailand	3–0	India	Bangkok, Thailand
	Wannipha Yeepracha 65'; Udorn Rajashri 69'; Yapidee Chaisawad 78'			Stadium: National Stadium; Attendance: 5,000

== 1986 ==
21 January Tien Soeharto Cup	India	1–0	Japan	South Jakarta, Indonesia
	Anita Sarkar 3'			Stadium: Kuningan Students' Stadium

26 January Tien Soeharto Cup F	Japan	7–0	India	South Jakarta, Indonesia
	Akemi Noda 14'; Kaori Nagamine 23', 47', 61'; Futaba Kioka 43'; Etsuko Handa 57', 59'			Stadium: Senayan Main Stadium

== See also ==
- India national football team results (1980–1989)
