= List of India women's international footballers =

This is a list of India women's international footballers – association football players who have played for the India women's national football team. The national team represents India in international association football. It is organised by All India Football Federation, the governing body of football in India, and competes as a member of the Asian Football Confederation.

== Players ==
Players in bold are currently active at international level or available for selection.

Player	Caps	Goals	Debut	Career	Ref.
Anita Sarkar	—N/a	—N/a	1980	—N/a	
Tresa Rozario	—N/a	—N/a	1980	—N/a	
Sushma Das	—N/a	—N/a	1980	—N/a	
Roma Das	—N/a	—N/a	1980	—N/a	
Chitra Gangadharan	—N/a	—N/a	1980	—N/a	
Shanti Mullick	—N/a	14	1980	—N/a	
Minoti Roy	—N/a	—N/a	1980	—N/a	
Sandhya Chakraborty	—N/a	—N/a	1980	—N/a	
Judy D'Silva	—N/a	—N/a	1980	—N/a	
Indrani Saha	—N/a	—N/a	1980	—N/a	
Chaitali Chatterjee	—N/a	—N/a	1980	—N/a	
Swati Gupta	—N/a	—N/a	1980	—N/a	
Amusana Devi	—N/a	—N/a	1980	—N/a	
Yolanda D'Souza	—N/a	—N/a	1980	—N/a	
Shukla Dutta	—N/a	—N/a	1980	—N/a	
Anita Pandit	—N/a	—N/a	1980	—N/a	
Kuntala Ghosh Dastidar	—N/a	—N/a	1980	—N/a	
Uma Kittu	—N/a	—N/a	1980	—N/a	
Chaoba Devi Langam	—N/a	4	1994	1994–1999	
Maria Rebello	—N/a	—N/a	1994	1994–2001	
Tababi Devi Thongam	—N/a	19	1995	1995–2011	
Bembem Devi Oinam	—N/a	18	1995	1995–2016	
Sradhanjali Samantaray	—N/a	1	1997	1997–2007	
Sujata Kar	—N/a	12	1998	1998–2007	
**Bala Devi Ngangom**	58	48	2005	2005–2024	
Sasmita Mallik	42	36	2007	2007–2017	
Aditi Chauhan	57	0	2011	2011–2023	
Kamala Devi Yumnam	51	36	2010	2010–2022	
**Ashalata Devi Loitongbam**	100	4	2011	2011–2024	
**Grace Dangmei**	94	23	2013	2013–	
**Panthoi Chanu Elangbam**	29	0	2014	2014–	
