= India national football team results (1970–1979) =

List of FIFA A matches played by India national team (1970–1979)

Results of India national football team from 1970–1979.

Summary Matches 104–162
Games	Won	Draw	Lost	GF	GA	Win %
59	18	9	32	80	140	30.51%
Biggest win
India 6–0 Malaysia 26 August 1971
Biggest defeat
India 1–9 Burma 6 August 1971
South Korea 8–0 India 18 August 1976
Honours
(bronze) 1970 Asian Games, Thailand
← 1960–69				1980–89 →		

Key
Indicates India national football team won the match
Indicates the match ended in draw
Indicates India national football team lost the match

== 1970 ==
30 July 1970
1970 Merdeka

Taiwan	1–0	India
Hu San Wah	Report

Stadium Merdeka, Kuala Lumpur, Malaysia

1 August 1970
1970 Merdeka

Malaysia	1–3	India
Wong Choon Wah	Report	Shyam Thapa; Syed Nayeemuddin; Ranjit Thapa

Perak Stadium, Ipoh, Malaysia

3 August 1970
1970 Merdeka

India	0–2	Burma
	Report	Ye Nyunt 28'; Win Maung 48'

Stadium Merdeka, Kuala Lumpur, Malaysia
Referee: H. Yasuda (Japan)

9 August 1970
1970 Merdeka

India	2–1	South Vietnam
Subhash Bhowmick; Mohammed Habib	Report	Nguyen Van Xe

Perak Stadium, Ipoh, Malaysia

12 August 1970
1970 Merdeka

South Korea	3–2	India
Chung Kang Ji 65'; Park Yi Chung 67'; Lee Hae Taik 76'	KFA	Subhash Bhowmick 16'; Mohammed Habib 25'

Stadium Merdeka, Kuala Lumpur, Malaysia

15 August 1970
1970 Merdeka

India	3–2	Hong Kong
Magan Singh 22', 65'; Mohammed Habib 69'	Report	Li Kwok keung 53'; Wai Hong 62'

Stadium Merdeka, Kuala Lumpur, Malaysia

10 December 1970
16:00
Asian Games GS

Thailand	2–2	India
Sahas Pornsavan 13'; Preecha Kitboon 21'	Report	Subhash Bhowmick 35', 57'

Chulalongkorn University Stadium, Bangkok, Thailand

11 December 1970
16:00
Asian Games GS

India	2–0	South Vietnam
Habib 76'; Rajvi 85'	Report

Chulalongkorn University Stadium, Bangkok, Thailand

15 December 1970
Asian Games QF

India	3–0	Indonesia
Doraiswamy Nataraj 74'; Rajvi 79'; Thapa 83'	Report

Chulalongkorn University Stadium, Bangkok, Thailand

17 December 1970
16:00
Asian Games QF

Japan	1–0	India
Kimura 88'	Report

Chulalongkorn University Stadium, Bangkok, Thailand
Attendance: 4,000

18 December 1970
16:00
Asian Games SF

Burma	2–0	India
Ye Nyunt 15', 48'	Report

Chulalongkorn University Stadium, Bangkok, Thailand

19 December 1970
Asian Games Bronze

India	1–0	Japan
Gurung 36'	Report

Chulalongkorn University Stadium, Bangkok, Thailand
Attendance: 6,000

== 1971 ==
6 June 1971
1971 Jakarta Anniversary

Thailand	1–0	India
	Report

Senayan Stadium, Jakarta, Indonesia

5 August 1971
1971 Merdeka Cup

Philippines	1–5	India
Tomás Lozano 56'	AIFF	Bhowmick 17' 67'; Thapa 28'; Habib 65'

Stadium Merdeka, Kuala Lumpur, Malaysia

7 August 1971
1971 Merdeka Cup

Indonesia	3–1	India
Waskito 1', 54', 58'	Report	Habib 42'

Stadium Merdeka, Kuala Lumpur, Malaysia

10 August 1971
1971 Merdeka Cup

Singapore	2–2	India
Kim Lye 44'; R Krishnan 70'	Report	Amar Bahadur 30'; Shyam Thapa 49'

Stadium Merdeka, Kuala Lumpur, Malaysia

13 August 1971
1971 Merdeka Cup

India	1–2	Hong Kong
Syed Nayeemuddin	Report	Wu Kwok Hung; L Kwow Keong

Stadium Merdeka, Kuala Lumpur, Malaysia

15 August 1971
1971 Merdeka Cup

India	1–9	Burma
Magan Singh	AIFF	Ye Nyunt; Tin Aung Moe; Win Maung; Aye Maung Gyi; Hia Tay

Stadium Merdeka, Kuala Lumpur, Malaysia

23 August 1971
1971 Pestasukan

India	2–1 (a.e.t.)	Indonesia
Habib 84' (pen.), 108'	Report	Suabi 52'

Jalan Besar Stadium, Kallang, Singapore

26 August 1971 (Note: Malaysia apparently used a team of players who had not appeared in the Merdeka Tournament in Malaysia immediately prior to this tournament in Singapore. But the match against Malaysia is considered as full A international by FIFA.)
1971 Pestasukan

India	6–0	Malaysia
Doraiswamy Nataraj 25'; Swapan Sengupta 50'; Subhash Bhowmick 40', 53'; Mohammed Habib 60', 67'	Report

Jalan Besar Stadium, Kallang, Singapore

28 August 1971
1971 Pestasukan

South Vietnam	0–0 (a.e.t.)	India
	Report

Jalan Besar Stadium, Kallang, Singapore

18 September 1971
Friendly

Soviet Union	5–0	India
Kolotov 6', 35', 39'; Khmelnytskyi 49', 71'	Report

Dynamo Stadium, Moscow, Soviet Union
Attendance: 12,000
Referee: Pavel Kazakov (Soviet Union)

== 1972 ==
22 March 1972 (Note: In 1999 FIFA deleted Olympics and Olympics Qualifying matches from 1960 to 1988 from its senior 'A' records and only keeping matches from 1908 to 1956 as full 'A' international fixtures. However most FAs ignore FIFA ruling and continue to recognize their Olympics and Olympics qualifying matches as official. According to RSSSF all those matches are considered official for AIFF.)
1972 Olympic Qualifier

India	3–4	Burma
Gurdev Singh 26'; Ghosh Dastidar 44', 50'	Report	Than Soe 11', 14'; Win Maung 24', 41'

Bogyoke Aung San Stadium, Rangoon, Burma

24 March 1972
1972 Olympic Qualifier

India	2–4	Indonesia
Samaresh Chowdhury 57'; Doraiswamy Natraj 89'	Report	Jacob Sihasale 10'; Kainun Waskito 16', 38'; Abdul Kadir 75'

Bogyoke Aung San Stadium, Rangoon, Burma

27 March
1972 Olympic Qualifier

India	0–1	Israel
	Report	Speigler 50'

Bogyoke Aung San Stadium, Rangoon, Burma

== 1973 ==
27 July 1973
1973 Merdeka Cup

South Vietnam	1–2	India
Ho Thanh Cang 8'	Report	Magan Singh 32'; Nicholas Pereira 57'

Stadium Merdeka, Kuala Lumpur, Malaysia

29 July 1973
1973 Merdeka Cup

India	2–0	Thailand
Singh 40' (pen.), 60' (pen.)	Report

Stadium Merdeka, Kuala Lumpur, Malaysia

31 July 1973
1973 Merdeka Cup

India	3–0	Khmer Republic
Bernard Pereira 7'; Magan Singh; N.Ulganathan 60'	Report

Stadium Merdeka, Kuala Lumpur, Malaysia

4 August 1973
1973 Merdeka Cup

Malaysia	4–0	India
Rahim Abdullah 20'; Namat Abdullah 60'; Harun Jusuh 62'; Mokhtar Dahari 88'	Report

Stadium Merdeka, Kuala Lumpur, Malaysia

9 August 1973
1973 Merdeka Cup

India	1–1	South Vietnam
M Prasannan	Report	Nguyen Van Mong
Penalties
Bernard Pereira (penalty scored); Manuel Jayaraj (penalty scored); Nicholas Pereira (penalty scored); Thomas Fernandes (penalty scored)	4−5	Ho Than Cang (penalty scored); Hyunh Van Chien (penalty scored); Cu Sinh (penalty scored); Quong Duo Vin (penalty scored); Duong Van Tho (penalty scored)

Stadium Merdeka, Kuala Lumpur, Malaysia

== 1974 ==
23 July 1974
1974 Merdeka Cup

Thailand	2–4	India
Pasrapon; Niwatana Sesawadi (pen.)	Report	Magan Singh; Bernard Pereira

Perak Stadium, Ipoh, Malaysia

25 July 1974
1974 Merdeka Cup

Malaysia	4–1	India
Syed Ahmed 5'; Mohammed Bakar 16', 34'; Wong Choon Wah 65'	Report	Magan Singh 70'

Perak Stadium, Ipoh, Malaysia
Attendance: 10,000
Referee: Yoon Il Oh (Korea)

29 July 1974
1974 Merdeka Cup

India	2–2	Hong Kong
Magan Singh 26'; Manjit Singh 75'	Report	Yu Kwok-Kit 34', 55'

Perak Stadium, Ipoh, Malaysia

2 August 1974
1974 Merdeka Cup

Indonesia	0–0 (a.e.t.)	India
	Report
Penalties
Oyong Liza (penalty scored); Wibisono (penalty scored); Anjao Asmar (penalty scored); Junaeri Adbilah (penalty scored)	4−2	Subrata Bhattacharya (penalty scored); Lateefuddin (penalty scored)

Perak Stadium, Ipoh, Malaysia

2 September 1974
16:00
Asian Games GS

Iraq	3–0	India
Hazim Jassam 19'; Hassan 27'; Kadhim 58'	Report

Amjadieh Stadium, Tehran, Iran

4 September 1974
18:30
Asian Games GS

China	7–1	India
Wang Jilian 2', 24'; Li Guoning 19' (pen.); Liu Qingquan; Rong Zhixing; Chi Shangbin	Report	Magan Singh 74'

Amjadieh Stadium, Tehran, Iran

7 September 1974
18:30
Asian Games GS

North Korea	4–1	India
Hong Song-Nam; Yong Song-Guk; Myong Dong-Chan	Report	Magan Singh

Amjadieh Stadium, Tehran, Iran

== 1976 ==
24 July 1976
Afghanistan Republic Day Festival Cup

Afghanistan	1–1	India
	Report	Harjinder Singh

Ghazi Stadium, Kabul, Afghanistan

8 August 1976
1976 Merdeka Cup

Japan	5–1	India
Kunishige Kamamoto 7'; Yoshikazu Nagai 50'; Yasuhiko Okudera 55', 70'; Nobuo Fujishima 85'	Report	A. Devraj Doraiswamy 35'

Stadium Merdeka, Kuala Lumpur, Malaysia
Attendance: 15,000

10 August 1976
1976 Merdeka Cup

Malaysia	5–1	India
Soh Chin Ann 15'; Mokhtar Dahari 24', 30'; Isa Bakar 46', 75'	Report	Manjit Singh

Stadium Merdeka, Kuala Lumpur, Malaysia

11 August 1976
1976 Merdeka Cup

Thailand	6–2	India
Weeryudh Sawesdi; Kittichai; Miwat Sriswat; Witaya Lonakhul	Report	Manjit Singh; Shabbir Ali

Stadium Merdeka, Kuala Lumpur, Malaysia

13 August 1976
1976 Merdeka Cup

Burma	2–2	India
Maung Win; Maung Kyi Lon	Report	Manjit Singh; Harjinder Singh

Stadium Merdeka, Kuala Lumpur, Malaysia

16 August 1976
1976 Merdeka Cup

India	3–1	Indonesia
Ali 7', 33', 35'	Report	Timokasiba 82'

Stadium Merdeka, Kuala Lumpur, Malaysia

18 August 1976
1976 Merdeka Cup

India	0−8	South Korea
	KFA	Cha Bum-kun 12', 45', 80'; Park Sang-in 15', 34'; Kim Jin-kook 18'; Kim Kang-nam 67'; Kim Ho-kon 76'

Stadium Merdeka, Kuala Lumpur, Malaysia
Attendance: 10,000

13 September 1976
19:10 UTC+9
President Cup

South Korea	4–0	India
Lee Young-Moo 40', 52'; Cho Dong-Hyun 42'; Cha Bum-Kun 55'	KFA

Dongdaemun Stadium, Seoul, South Korea
Attendance: 12,000
Referee: Ron Harris (New Zealand)

15 September 1976
17:30 UTC+9
President Cup

Singapore	2–1	India
Quah Kim Song 29', 66'	Report	A. D. Devaraju 71'

Dongdaemun Stadium, Seoul, South Korea

19 September 1976
14:00 UTC+9
President Cup

Malaysia	4–0	India
Abdah Alif 42'; Isa Bakar 83'; Wan Aziz 87'; Wan Rashid 89'	Report

Dongdaemun Stadium, Seoul, South Korea

== 1977 ==
5 September 1977
President's Cup

South Korea	3–0	India
Cha Bum-Kun 57', 89'; Kim Jae-Han 85'	KFA

Daegu Civil Stadium, Daegu, South Korea

7 September 1977
President's Cup

Thailand	4–0	India
Chaiyabutr 12', 42', 72'; Pichai Kongsri	Report

Busan Gudeok Stadium, Busan, South Korea

29 October 1977 (Note: This match against South Korea B in 1977 is considered as full A international for India by FIFA.But KFA doesn't show this match in their official database.)
King's Cup

South Korea	0–1	India
	AIFF	Gurdev Singh

National Stadium, Bangkok, Thailand

31 October 1977
King's Cup

Thailand	1–1	India
	Report

National Stadium, Bangkok, Thailand

4 November 1977
King's Cup

India	2–1	Singapore
Surajit Sengupta 14'; Harjinder Singh 90' (pen.)	Report	Mohamed Daud 46'

National Stadium, Bangkok, Thailand

8 November 1977
King's Cup

India	2–1	Indonesia
Harjinder Singh 83'; Mohammed Akbar 86'	Report	Nardi Rusdiana 53'

National Stadium, Bangkok, Thailand

10 November 1977
King's Cup

Malaysia	3–0	India
Isa Bakar 19', 35'; Lau Kwok Khan 59'	Report

National Stadium, Bangkok, Thailand
Attendance: 3000

== 1978 ==
12 December 1978
Asian Games GS

India	0–1	Malaysia
	Report	Isa Bakar 17'

Bangkok, Thailand

14 December 1978
Asian Games GS

India	3–0	Bangladesh
Bidesh Bose; Harjinder Singh; Xavier Pius	Report

Bangkok, Thailand

16 December 1978
Asian Games SFs

Kuwait	6–1	India
	Report	Surajit Sengupta

Bangkok, Thailand

18 December 1978
Asian Games SFs

North Korea	3–1	India
	Report	A. Devraj Doraiswamy

Bangkok, Thailand

20 December 1978
Asian Games SFs

India	0–3	Iraq
	Report	Mahmoud 20'; Shaker 25'; Saeed 63'

Bangkok, Thailand

== Opponents ==
Team	Pld	W	D	L	GF	GA	GD
Afghanistan	1	0	1	0	1	1	0
Bangladesh	1	1	0	0	3	0	+3
Burma	5	0	1	4	6	19	–13
China	1	0	0	1	1	7	–6
Hong Kong	3	1	1	1	6	6	0
Indonesia	7	4	1	2	13	10	+3
Iraq	2	0	0	2	0	6	–6
Israel	1	0	0	1	0	1	–1
Japan	3	1	0	2	2	6	–4
Khmer Republic	1	1	0	0	3	0	+3
Kuwait	1	0	0	1	1	6	–5
Malaysia	8	2	0	6	11	22	–11
North Korea	2	0	0	2	2	7	–5
Philippines	1	1	0	0	5	1	+4
Singapore	3	1	1	1	5	5	0
South Korea	5	1	0	4	3	18	–15
South Vietnam	5	3	2	0	7	3	+4
Soviet Union	1	0	0	1	0	5	–5
Taiwan	1	0	0	1	0	1	–1
Thailand	7	2	2	3	11	16	–5
Total	59	18	9	32	80	140	–60

== See also ==
- India national football team results (1960–1969)
- India national football team results (1980–1989)
- History of the India national football team
