= Sushil Bhattacharya =

Indian footballer and manager

Personal information
- Date of birth: 1924
- Place of birth: Bagdogra, Bengal Presidency, British India
- Date of death: 18 July 2015 (aged 90)
- Place of death: Kolkata, India
- Position: Winger

Senior career*
Years	Team	Apps	(Gls)
- Town Club
- Vidyasagar College
- Sporting Union
1945–1949	East Bengal		
1950–1956	Eastern Railway		
1951	→ East Bengal (loan)		

Managerial career
- Eastern Railway
- 1961–1962: East Bengal
- 1971–1972: Tollygunge Agragami
- 1975: India women
- 1975–1977: Bengal
- * Club domestic league appearances and goals

Sushil Bhattacharya (Bengali: সুশীল ভট্টাচার্য; 1924 – 18 July 2015) was an Indian professional football player and coach, who is credited for becoming the first manager of the India women's national football team. He was also the first head coach in history of East Bengal Club.

== Playing career ==
Born in Bagdogra, Bhattacharya used to play both cricket and hockey beside football. He began his playing career with Town Club in Berhampur, representing the team in IFA Shield. He then appeared with Vidyasagar College and Sporting Union, before signing with East Bengal in 1945. With East Bengal, he achieved the double in 1945 by winning both the Calcutta Football League and IFA Shield. His consistent performances on both flanks in a 3–2–5 formation helped the team achieving success and earned him a national team callup in 1946. He spent four seasons for the "red and gold brigade", played until 1949, refusing Gostha Pal and Abhilash Ghosh's offers of joining Mohun Bagan.

When I used to play for East Bengal, names like Apparao, Venkatesh, Dhanraj, Somana and Sunil Ghosh were part of the forward line. Later, Ahmed Khan and Abid joined us. There used to be five forwards and I could play in the position of both right-in and left-in.

— Bhattacharya on his playing days in East Bengal.

Bhattacharya moved to Eastern Railway in 1949, returning briefly to East Bengal on loan in 1951, for the Durand Cup. At the tournament, they defeated Rajasthan Club 2–1 in final and lifted their first ever Durand Cup. He also appeared with George Telegraph in Calcutta Football League.

== Coaching career ==
After retiring as a player, Bhattacharya began his coaching career with Eastern Railway, as an assistant coach. He was deputy of Bagha Shome at the club, which was then consisting players like P. K. Banerjee, Pradyut Barman, Prashanta Sinha, Nikhil Nandy, Pakhi Sen and others. He later became the first-ever permanent "head coach" coach of East Bengal. He won the IFA Shield and Calcutta League with East Bengal in 1961.

Bhattacharya also managed Tollygunge Agragami and helped the team gaining promotion to the CFL first division. He also helped Tollygunge reaching the IFA Shield final in 1971, in which they went down 2–0 to Mohammedan Sporting. He then took charge of different age group teams of Bengal alongside the Narendrapur Ramkrishna Mission College football team and Kolkata Veterans Club. During his tenure as coach, he managed players like Tulsidas Balaram, Subhash Bhowmick, Bhaskar Ganguli, Sukumar Samajpati and Krishanu Dey.

In 1975, an advertisement appeared in the local newspapers that notified that a women's team will be formed to represent Bengal. 150 girls like us had no idea about how the things work in professional football. Sushil Bhattacharya selected 16 girls that day. Apart from me, Shanti Mullick, Minati Roy, Shukla Dutta and Judy D'Silva were among the few who made the cut. The trial was held at the Kalighat ground. He was more like a father to us. Most of his students have served the nation for a long time. The biggest quality of his was not to get involved in any controversy ever. Also coaches often get criticized for their actions, but this was rarely the case for Sushil Da, such was the respect for the man. It was great to see the whole Kolkata football fraternity getting united to pay him the last homage. As a man who loved to keep himself away from fanfare, he never got his due recognition. We, be it the male or the female footballers, have been lucky to get him as a guide. As Sanjoy was telling today, we have to carry forward his legacy to develop Indian football further.

— Kuntala Ghosh Dastidar, Indian international, sharing her memories with Goal.com, after Bhattacharya's passing away in 2015.

In 1975, he came the first-ever manager of the Bengal women's team, and the first-ever manager of the newly formed India women's national football team. He is credited for nurturing Indian women talents like Shanti Mullick, the first ever Padma Shri awardee. Bhattacharya managed Indian women's team when, from 1975 to 1991, the administration was in hands of the Women's Football Federation of India (WFFI) and the Asian Ladies' Football Confederation (ALFC).

He was in charge of India S at the 1980 AFC Women's Championship in Calicut, in which they achieved second finish. In the next edition, at the 1981 AFC Women's Championship, India secured third place, and again finished as runners-up at the 1983. He also guided Bengal in Junior, Sub-Junior, Rajmata Jijabai Trophy and National Games, achieving nationwide success. In 1985, he was appointed head coach of a noted football coaching academy incorporated jointly by Russa United Club and Tollygunge Agragami. He retired from coaching in 2008.

== Death ==
Bhattacharya died of cancer at his home in Tollygunge, Kolkata, on 18 July 2015, aged 90.

== Honours ==
=== Player ===
East Bengal

- Calcutta Football League: 1945
- IFA Shield: 1945

Eastern Railway

- Rovers Cup runner-up: 1950

=== Manager ===
East Bengal

- Calcutta Football League: 1961
- IFA Shield: 1961
- Dr. H. K. Mookherjee Shield: 1961
- Rovers Cup: 1962

Tollygunge Agragami

- IFA Shield runner-up: 1971

India (women's)

- AFC Women's Championship runner-up: 1980, 1983

Individual

- The Telegraph Hall of Fame: 2012

== See also ==
- List of East Bengal Club coaches
- Women's football in India
