= Thephasadin Stadium =

Stadium in Thailand

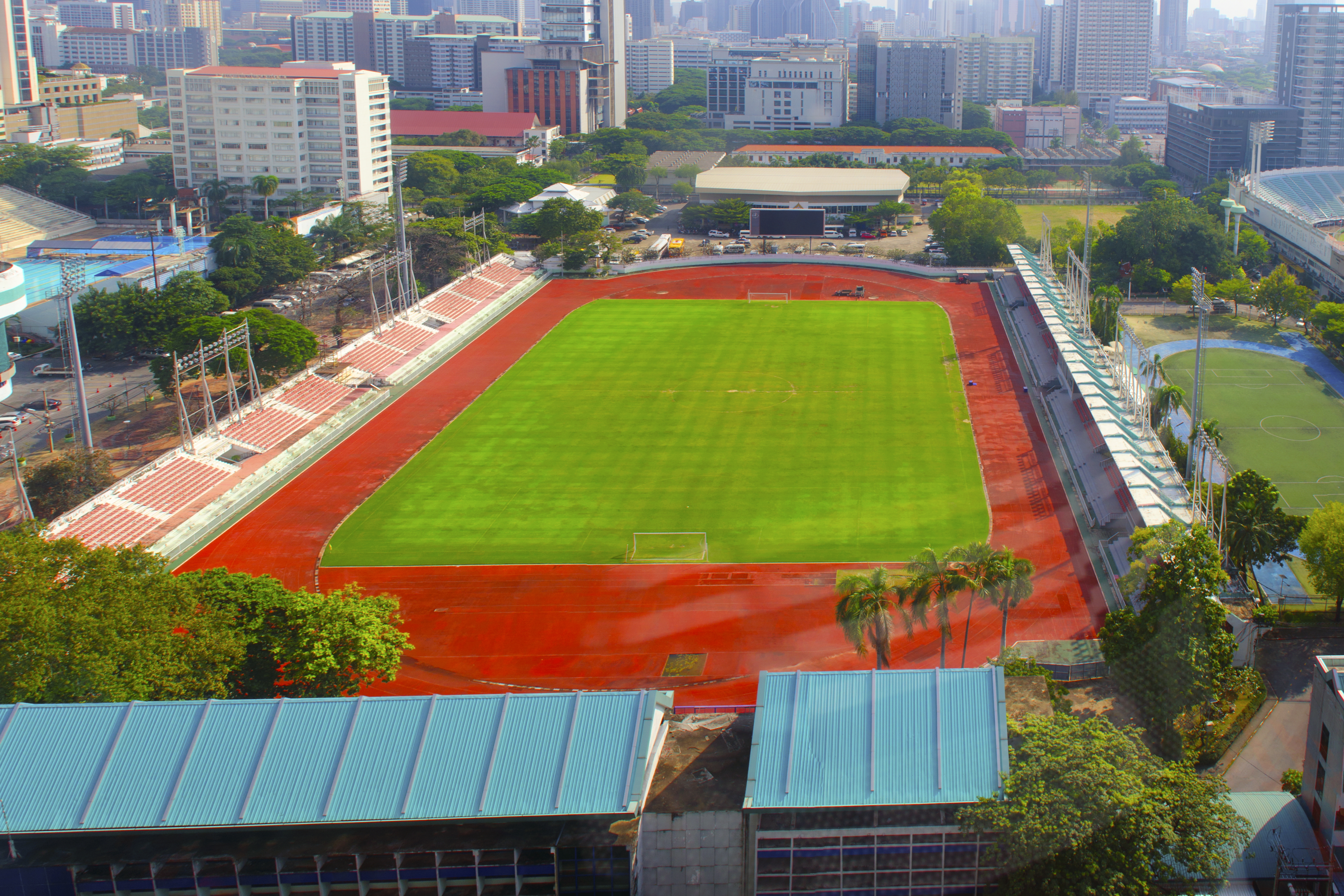
- Interactive map of Thephasadin Stadium
- Location: Pathum Wan, Bangkok, Thailand
- Coordinates: 13°44′44″N 100°31′39″E
- Owner: Chulalongkorn University
- Operator: Chulalongkorn University
- Capacity: 6,378
- Surface: Grass
- Public transit: BTS National Stadium

Construction
- Opened: N/A

Tenants
- BEC Tero Sasana F.C. 2011-2012; Bangkok Christian College F.C. 2010-2012; None as of Jan 2016.

Thephasadin Stadium (Thai: สนามเทพหัสดิน) is a multi-purpose stadium within the grounds of Thailand's National Stadium in Bangkok's Pathum Wan District. It is currently used mostly for football matches. The stadium holds 6,378 spectators.

== History ==
Thephasadin Stadium was constructed in 1965 for the use in 1966 Asian Games as the Hockey venue, hence its original name, Hockey Field. It was renamed in 1983 in memory of Naga Devahastin na Ayudhya, former Acting Director-General of the Department of Physical Education. With its capacity of 6,378 seats, it was retired from being the hockey stadium.

The stadium was used as the venue for the 19th WBA Junior bantamweight (115 lbs) world title defense of Khaosai Galaxy against Mexican challenger Armando Castro on December 22, 1991. As a result, Galaxy won by unanimous decision and regarded as his last fight.

Thephasatin Stadium used to be the temporary home of BEC Tero Sasana on 2010–2012 since Nong Chok Sport Stadium is undergoing renovations. Thephasatin Stadium, used as a football field organized for national football match and Asian sports after the Supachalasai Stadium.
