= India national football team results (1980–1989) =

This article lists the results of India national football team from 1980 to 1989.

Summary Matches 163–240
Games	Won	Draw	Lost	GF	GA	Win %
78	20	17	41	74	112	25.64%
Biggest win
India 5–0 Maldives 21 November 1987
Biggest defeat
Saudi Arabia 5–0 India 6 November 1983
Honours
(gold) 1985 South Asian Games, Bangladesh
(gold) 1987 South Asian Games, India
(bronze) 1989 South Asian Games, Pakistan
← 1970–79				1990–99 →		

Key
Indicates India national football team won the match
Indicates the match ended in draw
Indicates India national football team lost the match

== 1980 ==
24 February 1980 (Note: In 1999 FIFA deleted Olympics and Olympics Qualifying matches from 1960 to 1988 from its senior 'A' records and only keeping matches from 1908 to 1956 as full 'A' international fixtures. However most FAs ignore FIFA ruling and continue to recognize their Olympics and Olympics qualifying matches as official. According to RSSSF all those matches are considered official for AIFF.)
1980 Olympic Qualifier

India	0–1	China
	Report	Huang Xiangdong 64'

National Stadium, Kallang, Singapore

26 February 1980
1980 Olympic Qualifier

India	0–1	Singapore
	Report	Fandi Ahmad 54'

National Stadium, Kallang, Singapore

3 March 1980
1980 Olympic Qualifier

India	4–0	Sri Lanka
Shabbir Ali 38', 79'; Xavier Pius 66', 77'	Report

National Stadium, Kallang, Singapore
Attendance: 6000
Referee: Sano Toshikazu (Japan)

7 March 1980
1980 Olympic Qualifier

India	0–2	Iran
	Report	Barzegari 81'; Alidoosti 82'

National Stadium, Kallang, Singapore

10 March 1980
1980 Olympic Qualifier

India	1–2	North Korea
Xavier Pius 51'	Report	Se-uk An 31', 87'

National Stadium, Kallang, Singapore

== 1981 ==
1 September 1981
1981 Merdeka

India	0–0	New Zealand
	Report

Stadium Merdeka, Kuala Lumpur, Malaysia

3 September 1981
1981 Merdeka

Japan	3–2	India
M. Kato 32'; Yokoyama 35', 62'	Report	Ali 30'; Bhattacharya 89' (pen.)

Stadium Merdeka, Kuala Lumpur, Malaysia
Referee: G.W.Fleet (New Zealand)

5 September 1981
1981 Merdeka

India	2–0	United Arab Emirates
Harjinder Singh 26'; Xavier Pius 56'	AIFF

Stadium Merdeka, Kuala Lumpur, Malaysia

11 September 1981
1981 Merdeka

Indonesia	0–1	India
	Report	Roy 85'

Stadium Merdeka, Kuala Lumpur, Malaysia

15 September 1981
1981 Merdeka

Malaysia	2–2	India
Ibrahim Din 8'; Dahari 73'	Report	Harjinder Singh 31', 84'

Stadium Merdeka, Kuala Lumpur, Malaysia

26 October 1981
Friendly

United Arab Emirates	2–0	India
	Report

Abu Dhabi, United Arab Emirates

28 October 1981
Friendly

United Arab Emirates	3–1	India
Hassan Ali Mohamed; Salem Hadid	Report	Narendra Gurung 28'

Sharjah, United Arab Emirates

== 1982 ==
16 February 1982
1982 Nehru Cup

India	1–1	China
Mihir Bose 59'	Report	Zuo Shusheng 24'

Eden Gardens, Calcutta, India

18 February 1982
1982 Nehru Cup

India	2–2	South Korea
Banerjee 41'; Manas Bhattacharya 89' (pen.)	KFA	Hwang 64'; Chung 86'

Eden Gardens, Calcutta, India

20 February 1982
1982 Nehru Cup

India	1–3	Uruguay
Manas Bhattacharya 35'	Report	da Silva 8', 23'; Saralegui 70'

Eden Gardens, Calcutta, India

5 June 1982 (Note: Indonesia's team (known as PSSI Garuda) was composed mostly of young players with a view to developing the next generation of the national team. It can be considered as a national B team or youth team. It is not clear whether any of their matches are considered to be full internationals for the PSSI. The match against India is considered full international by FIFA.)
1982 President's Cup

India	0–1	Indonesia
	Report	Agusman Riyadi

Dongdaemun Stadium, Seoul, South Korea

9 June 1982
1982 President's Cup

India	0–1	South Korea
	KFA	Bhattacharya 65' (o.g.)

Busan Gudeok Stadium, Seoul, South Korea

13 June 1982
1982 President's Cup

India	0–0	Bahrain
	Report

Incheon Sungui Stadium, Seoul, South Korea

9 August 1982
1982 Merdeka

India	0–0	Thailand
	Report

Stadium Merdeka, Kuala Lumpur, Malaysia

9 August 1982
1982 Merdeka

India	0–3	Singapore
	Report	Salim Moin 5'; Fandi Ahmad 61'; Malek Awab 76'

Stadium Bandar Raya Pulau Pinang , Penang, Malaysia

12 August 1982
1982 Merdeka

Ghana	1–0	India
Alhassan 50'	Report

Stadium Merdeka, Kuala Lumpur, Malaysia

20 November 1982
1982 Asian Games

India	2–0	Bangladesh
P. Banerjee 1', 90+5'	Report

Jawaharlal Nehru Stadium, New Delhi, India

23 November 1982
1982 Asian Games

India	1–0	Malaysia
Kartick Seth 68'	Report

Ambedkar Stadium, New Delhi, India

26 November 1982
1982 Asian Games

India	2–2	China
Shabbir Ali 53'; Kartick Seth 60'	Report	Shen Xiangfu 25'; Zuo Shusheng 82'

Ambedkar Stadium, New Delhi, India

28 November 1982
1982 Asian Games QF

India	0–1	Saudi Arabia
	Report	Bayazid 89'

Jawaharlal Nehru Stadium, New Delhi, India

== 1983 ==
1 October 1983
1984 Olympics Q

India	1–2	Saudi Arabia
Bhattacharya 5'	Report	Majed Abdullah 28'; Khaled Al-Moajel 29'

Jawarhal Nehru Stadium, New Delhi, India

17 October 1983
1984 Olympics Q

Singapore	2–1	India
Awab 83'; Kannan 86'	Report	P. Singh 51'

National Stadium, Singapore, Kallang, Singapore
Attendance: 4,000

19 October 1983
1984 Olympics Q

India	4–0	Indonesia
Shabbir Ali 10', 20'; Kartick Seth 39'; Biswajit Bhattacharya 60'	Report

National Stadium, Singapore, Kallang, Singapore
Attendance: 3,000
Referee: Arthur Edwards (New Zealand)

22 October 1983
1984 Olympics Q

India	3–3	Malaysia
Bhattacharya 30'; Ali 36'; Banerjee 65'	Report	Singh 3' (pen.), 59' (pen.); Kim 90+2'

National Stadium, Singapore, Kallang, Singapore
Attendance: 7,000

25 October 1983
1984 Olympics Q

India	0–2	Malaysia
	Report	Kim 33'; Karim Pin 60'

Stadium Merdeka, Kuala Lumpur, Malaysia

29 October 1983
1984 Olympics Q

India	1–0	Singapore
Ali 44'	Report

Stadium Merdeka, Kuala Lumpur, Malaysia
Attendance: 3,000
Referee: S. Okaya (Japan)

31 October 1983
1984 Olympics Q

Indonesia	0–1	India
	Report	Ali 53'

Stadium Merdeka, Kuala Lumpur, Malaysia
Attendance: 3,000
Referee: Lee Do-Ha (South Korea)

6 November 1983
1984 Olympics Q

Saudi Arabia	5–0	India
Abdullah; Al-Musaibeah	Report

Prince Faisal bin Fahad Stadium, Riyadh, Saudi Arabia

== 1984 ==
11 January 1984
1984 Nehru Cup

India	1−2	Poland
Bhattacharya 42'	Report	Dziekanowski 10'; Pawlak 34'

Eden Gardens, Calcutta, India
Attendance: 90,000
Referee: Károly Palotai (Hungary)

14 January 1984
1984 Nehru Cup

India	0−1	Argentina
	Report	Gareca 79'

Eden Gardens, Calcutta, India
Attendance: 50,000
Referee: Stefan Petrescu (Romania)

25 January 1984
1984 Nehru Cup

China	3−0	India
Li Huayun 42', 60'; Jia Xiuquan 81'	Report

Eden Gardens, Calcutta, India

9 June 1984
Friendly

Trinidad and Tobago	1–3	India
Nevick Denoon	Report	Ravi Bhusan; Babu Mani

Skinner Park, San Fernando, Trinidad & Tobago
Attendance: 8,000
Referee: Richard Ramcharan (Trinidad and Tobago)

11 June 1984
Friendly

Trinidad and Tobago	3–0	India
Adrian Fonrose 2'; Robert Joseph 60'; Bertram O´Brien 85'	Report

Skinner Park, San Fernando, Trinidad & Tobago

15 June 1984
Friendly

Suriname	6–2	India
	Report	Parminder Singh; Asokan

André Kamperveen Stadion, Paramaribo, Suriname
Referee: OE Biljhout (Suriname)

17 June 1984
Friendly

Suriname	4–1	India
	Report	Ravi Bhusan

André Kamperveen Stadion, Paramaribo, Suriname

22 June 1984
Friendly

Trinidad and Tobago	3–0	India
	Report

Arima Municipal Stadium, Arima, Trinidad & Tobago

21 August 1984
1984 Great Wall Cup

China	2–0	India
Zuo Shusheng 9'; Li Hui 70'	Report

Workers' Stadium, Beijing, China

12 October 1984
1984 AFC Q

India	4–0	North Yemen
Dey; Ali; Banerjee; Mani	Report

Salt Lake Stadium, Calcutta, India

14 October 1984
1984 AFC Q

India	2–1	Malaysia
Thapa; Mani	Report	Abidin

Salt Lake Stadium, Calcutta, India

17 October 1984
1984 AFC Q

India	2–0	Pakistan
Ali 24', 82'	Report

Salt Lake Stadium, Calcutta, India

19 October 1984
15:30 IST
1984 AFC Q

South Korea	1–0	India
Park Chang-Seon 48'	Report

Salt Lake Stadium, Calcutta, India

2 December 1984
21:00 UTC+8
1984 Asia Cup

Singapore	2–0	India
Awab 36'; Saad 81'	Report

National Stadium, Kallang, Singapore
Attendance: 21,000
Referee: Antonio Márquez (Mexico)

4 December 1984
19:00 UTC+8
1984 Asia Cup

United Arab Emirates	2–0	India
Al-Talyani 81'; Khamees 88'	Report

National Stadium, Kallang, Singapore
Attendance: 2,010
Referee: Abu Wahid Shanbe (Oman)

8 December 1984
19:00 UTC+8
1984 Asia Cup

Iran	0–0	India
	Report

National Stadium, Kallang, Singapore
Attendance: 10,000
Referee: Koh Guan Kiat (Malaysia)

9 December 1984
21:00 UTC+8
1984 Asia Cup

China	3–0	India
Lin Lefeng 19'; Gu Guangming 59'; Jia Xiuquan 79'	Report

National Stadium, Kallang, Singapore
Attendance: 8,256
Referee: Ahmed Jassim (Bahrain)

== 1985 ==
31 January 1985
1985 Nehru Cup

Morocco	1−0	India
Rajhy 34'	Report

Jawaharlal Nehru Stadium, Cochin, India
Referee: Park Hee-Chang (South Korea)

21 March 1985
1986 FIFA Q

Indonesia	2−1	India
Nurdiansyah 41', 49'	Report	Dey 34'

Senayan Stadium, Jakarta, Indonesia
Attendance: 70,000
Referee: Reynaldo Reyes (Philippines)

26 March 1985
1986 FIFA Q

Thailand	0−0	India
	Report

Suphachalasai Stadium, Bangkok, Thailand
Referee: Shunsaku Nakanishi (Japan)

30 March 1985
1986 FIFA Q

Bangladesh	1−2	India
Chunnu 42'	Report	Ghosh 34'; Panji 84'

Dhaka Stadium, Dhaka, Bangladesh
Attendance: 8,000
Referee: Liu Jingli (China)

6 April 1985
1986 FIFA Q

India	1−1	Indonesia
Narender Thapa 89'	Report	Dede Suleiman 20'

Salt Lake Stadium, Calcutta, India
Attendance: 10,000
Referee: Farouk Mustafa (Iraq)

9 April 1985
1986 FIFA Q

India	1−1	Thailand
Krishanu Dey 85'	Report	Narasek Boongeang 76'

Salt Lake Stadium, Calcutta, India
Attendance: 6,000
Referee: Shokor Abdulkader Abdul Latif (Iraq)

12 April 1985
1986 FIFA Q

India	2−1	Bangladesh
Bikash Panji 36'; Camilo Gonsalves 54'	Report	Bhadra 15'

Salt Lake Stadium, Calcutta, India
Attendance: 8,000
Referee: Salih Abdul Karim Saadi (Iraq)

21 December 1985
1985 S.A.Games

India	2−0	Nepal
Ghosh	Report

National Stadium, Dhaka, Bangladesh

25 December 1985
1985 S.A.Games

India	1−1	Bangladesh
Ghosh 37'	Report	Aslam 39'
Penalties
Krishnendu Roy (penalty scored); Debashis Misra (penalty scored); Krishanu Dey (penalty scored); Prasanta Banerjee (penalty scored)	4–1	Kaiser Hamid (penalty scored); Aslam (penalty missed); Abu Yusuf (penalty missed)

National Stadium, Dhaka, Bangladesh

== 1986 ==
25 January 1986
Nehru Cup

India	0−0	China
	Report

Greenfield International Stadium, Trivandrum, India

30 January 1986
Nehru Cup

India	0−1	Peru
	Report	Navarro 60'

Greenfield International Stadium, Trivandrum, India

30 June 1986
Friendly

Burma	3−1	India
	Report

Yangon, Myanmar

24 July 1986
1986 Merdeka

Malaysia	3–0	India
Azhar Shariff 11'; Hassan 71', 74'	Report

Stadium Merdeka, Kuala Lumpur, Malaysia
Attendance: 7,582

30 July 1986
1986 Merdeka

India	3−1	Thailand
Dey 5', 13', 48'	Report	Laohakul (pen.)

Stadium Jalan Raja Muda, Kuala Lumpur, Malaysia

20 September 1986
1986 Asian Games

South Korea	3−0	India
Noh Soo-jin 10'; Choi Soon-ho 36'; Chang-sun 84' (pen.)	Report

Busan Gudeok Stadium, Busan, South Korea

22 September 1986
1986 Asian Games

India	1−2	China
Debashish Mishra 37'	Report	Ma Lin 22', 25'

Busan Gudeok Stadium, Busan, South Korea

26 September 1986
1986 Asian Games

Bahrain	3−0	India
Abdulrahman Hisham 3', 45'; Yousif Ali Hassan 23'	Report

Busan Gudeok Stadium, Busan, South Korea

== 1987 ==
21 November 1987
1987 South Asian Games

India	0−0	Pakistan
	Report

Salt Lake Stadium, Calcutta, India

23 November 1987
1987 South Asian Games

India	5−0	Maldives
Shareef (o.g.); Sisir Ghosh; Amit Bhadra; Deepak Kumar; Krishanu Dey	Report

Salt Lake Stadium, Calcutta, India

26 November 1987
1987 South Asian Games

India	1−0	Nepal
Mohammed Fareed 89'	Report

Salt Lake Stadium, Calcutta, India
Attendance: 80,000

== 1988 ==
6 February 1988
1988 AFC Q

Bangladesh	0–0	India
	Report

Zayed Sports City Stadium, Abu Dhabi, UAE

9 February 1988
1988 AFC Q

India	0–1	Thailand
	Report	Boonpob Prapruit 89'

Zayed Sports City Stadium, Abu Dhabi, UAE

11 February 1988
1988 AFC Q

India	0–1	North Yemen
	Report	Mohammed Al Sharani 80'

Zayed Sports City Stadium, Abu Dhabi, UAE

13 February 1988
1988 AFC Q

United Arab Emirates	3–0	India
Khamees 59'; Mohamed 63'; Al Talyani 67'	Report

Zayed Sports City Stadium, Abu Dhabi, UAE

16 February 1988
1988 AFC Q

China	1–0	India
Liu Haiguang 30'	Report

Zayed Sports City Stadium, Abu Dhabi, UAE

== 1989 ==
23 October 1989
1989 South Asian Games

Bangladesh	1–1	India
Manik 34'	Report	Chatterjee 84'

Jinnah Sports Stadium, Islamabad, Pakistan
Referee: Ahmed Hakeem Ibrahim (UAE)

25 October 1989
1989 South Asian Games

India	2–1	Sri Lanka
Ghosh 39'; Khongsai 66'	Report	Silva 54'

Jinnah Sports Stadium, Islamabad, Pakistan
Referee: Ahmed Hakeem Ibrahim (UAE)

26 October 1989
1989 South Asian Games

India	2–1	Nepal
Afonso 18'; Chatterjee 62'	Report	Shah 56'

Jinnah Sports Stadium, Islamabad, Pakistan
Attendance: 40,000
Referee: Ahmed Ali (Pakistan)

== Opponents ==
Team	Pld	W	D	L	GF	GA	GD
Argentina	1	0	0	1	0	1	–1
Bahrain	2	0	1	1	0	3	–3
Bangladesh	6	3	3	0	8	4	+4
Burma	1	0	0	1	1	3	–2
China	9	0	3	6	4	15	–11
Ghana	1	0	0	1	0	1	–1
Indonesia	6	3	1	2	8	4	+4
Iran	2	0	1	1	0	2	–2
Japan	1	0	0	1	2	3	–1
Malaysia	6	2	2	2	8	11	–3
Maldives	1	1	0	0	5	0	+5
Morocco	1	0	0	1	0	1	–1
Nepal	3	3	0	0	5	1	+4
New Zealand	1	0	1	0	0	0	0
North Korea	1	0	0	1	1	2	–1
Pakistan	2	1	1	0	2	0	+2
Peru	1	0	0	1	0	1	–1
Poland	1	0	0	1	1	2	–1
Saudi Arabia	3	0	0	3	1	8	–7
Singapore	5	1	0	4	2	8	–6
South Korea	4	0	1	3	2	7	–5
Sri Lanka	2	2	0	0	6	1	+5
Suriname	2	0	0	2	3	10	–7
Thailand	5	1	3	1	4	3	+1
Trinidad and Tobago	3	1	0	2	3	7	–4
United Arab Emirates	5	1	0	4	3	10	–7
Uruguay	1	0	0	1	1	3	–2
Yemen	2	1	0	1	4	1	+3
Total	78	20	17	41	74	112	–38

== See also ==
- Indian women's national football team results (1980–1989)
- India national football team results (1970–1979)
- India national football team results (1990–1999)
- History of the India national football team
