= Western Australia soccer team =

Western Australia
- Nickname: Black Swans
- Association: Football West
- Head coach: Men: Ivan Zuvela; Women: Stephen Peters
First colours

First international
- Western Australia 0–4 England (1902)

Biggest win
- Western Australia 17–0 Albany XI (1975)

Biggest defeat
- Western Australia 1–14 Hajduk (Socialist Federal Republic of Yugoslavia) (1949); Western Australia 1–14 Everton (England) (1964)

The Western Australia soccer team is a team representing the Australian state of Western Australia. The state team is currently administered by Football West.

== History ==
The team first played in 1902 against the England Cricket Team.

== Results ==
Win Draw Loss

=== Pre World War 2 ===
| Date | Venue | Opponent | Score |
|---|---|---|---|
| 1902 | Perth | England Cricket XI | 0–4 |
| 1904 | Perth | England Cricket XI | 0–3 |
| 1905 | Adelaide | South Australia | 1–5 |
| 1905 | Adelaide | South Australia | 4–5 |
| 1905 | Adelaide | South Australia | 0–1 |
| 1908 | Perth | England Cricket XI | 2–3 |
| 1909 | Newcastle | Northern Districts | 0–4 |
| 1909 | NSW | South Maitland XI | 2–0 |
| 1909 | Sydney | New South Wales | 2–2 |
| 1909 | Sydney | Granville District | 1–1 |
| 1909 | Sydney | New South Wales | 1–3 |
| 1909 | Sydney | Sydney Metropolitan XI | 4–0 |
| 1909 | Wollongong | South-Coast XI | 2–2 |
| 1909 | Melbourne | (Victoria (state)) Victoria | 3–0 |
| 1909 | Adelaide | South Australia | 4–4 |
| 1909 | Adelaide | South Australia | 4–4 |
| 1910 | Perth | South Australia | 2–0 |
| 1910 | Perth | South Australia | 4–1 |
| 1910 | Perth | South Australia | 1–1 |
| 1920 | Perth | Australian Naval Fleet Combined XI | 7–0 |

| Date | Venue | Opponent | Score |
|---|---|---|---|
| 1924 | Perth | Royal Navy Special Services Squadron XI | 4–7 |
| 1925 | Perth | England Cricket XI | 5–3 |
| 1925 | Perth | England F.A. XI | 0–7 |
| 1925 | Perth | England F.A. XI | 1–5 |
| 1925 | Perth | England F.A. XI | 1–5 |
| 1927 | Perth | Czechoslovakia-Bohemia | 3–11 |
| 1927 | Perth | Czechoslovakia-Bohemia | 4–6 |
| 1927 | Perth | Hong Kong University Students XI | 1–4 |
| 1927 | Perth | Hong Kong University Students XI | 1–2 |
| 1927 | Perth | Hong Kong University Students XI | 4–0 |
| 1927 | Perth | Czechoslovakia-Bohemia | 2–3 |
| 1929 | Perth | England Cricket XI | 5–3 |
| 1929 | Perth | HMAS Canberra XI | 7–1 |
| 1935 | Perth | (Japan) HIJMS Asama/HIJMS Yakumo XI | 12–3 |
| 1937 | Perth | England Amateur XI | 1–6 |
| 1937 | Perth | HMAS Sydney XI | 4–2 |
| 1938 | Perth | India | 5–1 |
| 1938 | Perth | India | 1–3 |
| 1939 | Perth | Hapoel & Maccabi (Palestine) | 4–4 |
| 1939 | Perth | Hapoel & Maccabi (Palestine) | 3–7 |

=== 1940s and 1950s ===
| Date | Venue | Opponent | Score |
|---|---|---|---|
| 1947 | Perth | South Africa | 2–12 |
| 1948 | Adelaide | South Australia | 4–2 |
| 1948 | Adelaide | Tasmania | 4–3 |
| 1948 | Adelaide | Tasmania | 6–2 |
| 1949 | Perth | (Socialist Federal Republic of Yugoslavia) Hajduk Split | 1–14 |
| 1949 | Perth | (Socialist Federal Republic of Yugoslavia) Hajduk Split | 1–13 |
| 1950 | Perth | HMAS Sydney XI | 5–1 |
| 1950 | Perth | Australian XI | 1–4 |
| 1952 | Perth | Australian XI | 1–1 |
| 1952 | Perth | Australian XI | 0–2 |
| 1954 | Adelaide | South Australia | 4–2 |
| 1954 | Adelaide | Queensland | 4–2 |
| 1954 | Adelaide | Tasmania | 4–2 |
| 1954 | Adelaide | (Victoria (state)) Victoria | 2–2 |
| 1954 | Adelaide | New South Wales | 0–1 |

| Date | Venue | Opponent | Score |
|---|---|---|---|
| 1955 | Perth | (Austria) Rapid Wien | 1–6 |
| 1955 | Perth | (Austria) Rapid Wien | 0–10 |
| 1955 | Perth | South Africa | 1–2 |
| 1955 | Perth | South Africa | 1–2 |
| 1956 | Perth | Australia | 1–4 |
| 1957 | Perth | (Hungary) Ferencváros | 1–6 |
| 1957 | Perth | (Hungary) Ferencváros | 0–9 |
| 1957 | Perth | (Hong Kong) Eastern Athletic | 0–2 |
| 1957 | Perth | (Hong Kong) Eastern Athletic | 2–6 |
| 1958 | Perth | (England) Blackpool | 0–2 |
| 1958 | Adelaide | South Australia | 2–2 |
| 1958 | Adelaide | South Australia | 2–5 |
| 1959 | Perth | (Scotland) Heart of Midlothian | 0–9 |
| 1959 | Perth | (Scotland) Heart of Midlothian | 1–10 |

=== 1960s ===
| Date | Venue | Opponent | Score |
|---|---|---|---|
| 1960 | Perth | South Australia | 2–2 |
| 1960 | Perth | South Australia | 2–0 |
| 1962 | Perth | (Victoria (state)) Victoria | 1–2 |
| 1962 | Perth | (Victoria (state)) Victoria | 0–5 |
| 1962 | Perth | (Victoria (state)) Victoria | 1–2 |
| 1963 | Perth | Northern New South Wales | 6–2 |
| 1963 | Melbourne | (Victoria (state)) Victoria | 1–8 |
| 1963 | Adelaide | South Australia | 1–2 |
| 1964 | Perth | (England) Everton | 1–14 |
| 1964 | Hobart | Tasmania | 5–3 |
| 1964 | Melbourne | New South Wales | 2–4 |
| 1964 | Perth | Queensland | 3–3 |
| 1965 | Perth | (England) Chelsea | 1–6 |
| 1966 | Perth | (Italy) AS Roma | 2–4 |
| 1966 | Perth | (Hong Kong) Sing Tao | 1–1 |

| Date | Venue | Opponent | Score |
|---|---|---|---|
| 1967 | Perth | (England) Manchester United | 0–7 |
| 1967 | Singapore | Singapore Joint Services | 4–6 |
| 1967 | Perth | New Zealand | 2–5 |
| 1968 | Perth | (Wales) Cardiff City | 1–6 |
| 1968 | George Town | (Malaysia) Penang FA | 3–5 |
| 1968 | Alor Setar | (Malaysia) Kedah FA | 3–3 |
| 1968 | Malaysia | (Malaysia) Trengganu | 5–6 |
| 1968 | Malaysia | (Malaysia) Kota Bharu | 6–10 |
| 1968 | Perth | South Australia | 1–3 |
| 1969 | Perth | South Australia | 2–4 |
| 1969 | Perth | Greece | 1–2 |
| 1969 | Penang | (Malaysia) Penang FA | 5–4 |
| 1969 | Bangkok | South Vietnam | 1–3 |
| 1969 | Bangkok | Singapore | 3–1 |
| 1969 | Bangkok | Indonesia | 1–3 |

=== Merdeka Cup Tournament ===
Western Australia competed in the Merdeka Tournament (Pestabola Merdeka) four times between 1967 and 1970. The state's best performance in the tournament was third in 1968.

| Date | Venue | Opponent | Score |
|---|---|---|---|
| 1967 | Kuala Lumpur | Malaysia | 2–3 |
| 1967 | Kuala Lumpur | India | 1–3 |
| 1967 | Kuala Lumpur | Thailand | 3–1 |
| 1967 | Kuala Lumpur | South Vietnam | 0–3 |
| 1967 | Kuala Lumpur | Hong Kong | 3–2 |
| 1968 | Kuala Lumpur | South Korea | 3–0 |
| 1968 | Ipoh | Indonesia | 5–4 |
| 1968 | Kuala Lumpur | Japan B | 0–1 |
| 1968 | Kuala Lumpur | Taiwan | 3–2 |
| 1968 | Ipoh | Singapore | 4–4 |
| 1968 | Kuala Lumpur | Malaysia | 3–4 |
| 1968 | Kuala Lumpur | Indonesia | 3–1 |

| Date | Venue | Opponent | Score |
|---|---|---|---|
| 1969 | Malaysia | Burma | 2–5 |
| 1969 | Malaysia | Singapore | 2–4 |
| 1969 | Malaysia | India | 1–0 |
| 1969 | Malaysia | South Korea | 2–3 |
| 1969 | Malaysia | India | 1–2 |
| 1970 | Kuala Lumpur | Burma | 0–1 |
| 1970 | Kuala Lumpur | South Vietnam | 3–1 |
| 1970 | Kuala Lumpur | India | 0–2 |
| 1970 | Kuala Lumpur | Malaysia | 1–4 |
| 1970 | Ipoh | Taiwan | 3–1 |
| 1970 | Kuala Lumpur | Thailand | 0–2 |

=== Marah Halim Cup Football Tournament ===
Western Australia competed in the Marah Halim Cup Football Tournament 3 times between 1975 and 1977, and were champions in 1975 and 1976.

| Date | Venue | Opponent | Score |
|---|---|---|---|
| 1975 | Medan | (Indonesia) Surabaya | 4–1 |
| 1975 | Medan | Thailand | 2–1 |
| 1975 | Medan | (Indonesia) Ujung Pandang | 1–2 |
| 1975 | Medan | Japan | 4–2 |
| 1975 | Medan | (Indonesia) Persija Jakarta | 2–0 |
| 1975 | Medan | (Indonesia) PSMS Medan | 1–2 |
| 1975 | Medan | Thailand | 3–1 |
| 1975 | Medan | South Korea | 2–0 |
| 1976 | Medan | Thailand | 1–0 |

| Date | Venue | Opponent | Score |
|---|---|---|---|
| 1976 | Medan | (Indonesia) Aceh FA | 7–2 |
| 1976 | Medan | (Indonesia) Persebaya | 2–0 |
| 1976 | Medan | South Korea | 1–2 |
| 1976 | Medan | Japan | 1–0 |
| 1976 | Medan | Burma | 4–0 |
| 1976 | Medan | South Korea | 2–0 |
| 1977 | Medan | Thailand | 1–2 |
| 1977 | Medan | (Indonesia) Ujung Pandang | 2–0 |
| 1977 | Medan | (Indonesia) Persija Jakarta | 0–1 |

=== 1970s ===
| Date | Venue | Opponent | Score |
|---|---|---|---|
| 1970 | Perth | (West Germany) Hertha 03 Zehlendorf | 2–2 |
| 1970 | Perth | (Czechoslovakia) Inter Bratislavia | 0–4 |
| 1970 | Perth | (Soviet Union) Dynamo Moscow | 0–5 |
| 1970 | Perth | Australia | 2–6 |
| 1970 | Perth | (England) Manchester City F.C. | 1–1 |
| 1970 | Jakarta | Indonesia | 1–3 |
| 1970 | Jakarta | (Indonesia) Bogor State | 3–1 |
| 1970 | Jakarta | Hong Kong | 1–2 |
| 1970 | Perth | (Switzerland) FC Zurich | 1–1 |
| 1970 | Singapore | Singapore | 8–1 |
| 1970 | Perth | (Indonesia) Indonesian Universities | 0–0 |
| 1971 | Perth | (Czechoslovakia) VSS Košice | 0–2 |
| 1971 | Perth | (Soviet Union) Dynamo Moscow | 3–3 |
| 1971 | Jakarta | Cambodia | 2–2 |
| 1971 | Jakarta | Malaysia | 2–3 |
| 1971 | Jakarta | South Korea | 2–0 |
| 1971 | Palembang | Bertimina | 1–1 |
| 1971 | Palembang | (Indonesia) Jakarta | 3–0 |
| 1971 | Perth | (England) English F.A. | 1–6 |
| 1972 | Perth | (West Germany) Hertha 03 Zehlendorf | 1–1 |
| 1972 | Perth | (England) Wolverhampton Wanderers | 0–3 |
| 1972 | Perth | New Zealand | 2–3 |

| Date | Venue | Opponent | Score |
|---|---|---|---|
| 1973 | Perth | (England) Stoke City | 0–3 |
| 1973 | Perth | (England) Bournemouth | 0–4 |
| 1973 | Perth | South Australia | 0–1 |
| 1974 | Perth | (Scotland) Aberdeen | 3–5 |
| 1974 | Perth | (England) Chelsea | 0–1 |
| 1974 | Adelaide | South Australia | 2–3 |
| 1975 | Perth | (Poland) Legia Warsaw | 2–4 |
| 1975 | Perth | (England) Middlesbrough | 1–1 |
| 1975 | Perth | (England) Manchester United | 1–2 |
| 1975 | Perth | (Scotland) Rangers | 2–1 |
| 1975 | Albany | Albany XI | 17–0 |
| 1975 | Perth | Australia B | 1–0 |
| 1976 | Perth | (Canada) Toronto Metros-Croatia | 2–0 |
| 1976 | Perth | (Indonesia) Jakarta | 2–2 |
| 1976 | Perth | (England) Tottenham Hotspur | 0–4 |
| 1976 | Perth | (England) Sunderland | 1–2 |
| 1977 | Perth | (West Germany) Hertha 03 Zehlendorf | 2–2 |
| 1977 | Perth | (England) Middlesbrough | 1–3 |
| 1978 | Perth | (Scotland) Dundee | 1–3 |
| 1979 | (N) | Australian-Croatian XI | 5–1 |
| 1979 | Perth | (England) Norwich City | 1–2 |
| 1979 | Perth | (Socialist Federal Republic of Yugoslavia) FK Vardar | 4–4 |

=== 1980s ===
| Date | Venue | Opponent | Score |
|---|---|---|---|
| 1980 | Perth | (Socialist Federal Republic of Yugoslavia) Red Star Belgrade | 0–5 |
| 1980 | Perth | (Italy) A.C. Milan | 2–3 |
| 1981 | Indonesia | Japan XI | 1–2 |
| 1981 | Indonesia | (Indonesia) Persiraja Banda Aceh | 5–0 |
| 1981 | Indonesia | (Malaysia) PSP Padang | 5–0 |
| 1981 | Indonesia | South Korea XI | 0–0 |
| 1982 | Perth | (England) Bournemouth | 1–3 |
| 1982 | Indonesia | South Korea XI | 2–0 |
| 1982 | Indonesia | (Indonesia) Semarang | 1–1 |
| 1982 | Indonesia | West Germany (Amateur) | 2–4 |
| 1982 | Perth | (Republic of Ireland) U.C.Dublin | 3–0 |
| 1983 | Perth | (England) Queens Park Rangers | 1–6 |
| 1983 | Indonesia | Indonesia Olympic Team | 1–0 |
| 1983 | Indonesia | (Indonesia) Yanita Utama | 0–0 (Note: match abandoned due to rain) |
| 1983 | Indonesia | (Indonesia) Arseto Solo | 2–0 |
| 1983 | Perth | Australia | 2–1 |

| Date | Venue | Opponent | Score |
|---|---|---|---|
| 1983 | Thailand | Malaysia | 1–0 |
| 1983 | Thailand | China XI | 2–1 |
| 1983 | Thailand | (England) Liverpool County | 2–2 |
| 1984 | Thailand | Thailand B | 1–0 |
| 1984 | Thailand | Indonesia | 1–2 |
| 1984 | Perth | (England) Nottingham Forest | 1–4 |
| 1984 | India | (India) Hyderabad | 4–1 |
| 1984 | India | South Korea | 2–2 |
| 1984 | India | (India) JCT Mills | 1–1 |
| 1984 | India | (Bangladesh) Dhaka Abahani | 2–0 |
| 1984 | India | (China) Liaoning | 0–1 |
| 1985 | Perth | (Australia) Australian Youth Team | 0–2 |
| 1986 | Perth | (Republic of Ireland) U.C.Dublin | 6–2 |
| 1988 | Perth | Netherlands Amateurs | 0–6 |
| 1989 | Perth | (England) Millwall | 0–1 |

=== 1990s ===
| Date | Venue | Opponent | Score |
|---|---|---|---|
| 1990 | Perth | (Soviet Union) Moscow Torpedo | 1–2 |
| 1990 | Perth | Singapore | 4–4 (5–4(p)) |
| 1991 | Perth | (Malaysia) Selangor | 2–1 |
| 1991 | Indonesia | (Indonesia) Jakarta | 0–0 |
| 1991 | Indonesia | Indonesia B (PSSIB) | 3–1 |
| 1991 | Indonesia | (Indonesia) Perstu Tapa Nuli Utara | 0–0 |
| 1991 | Indonesia | (China) Chinese Army | 1–1 (2–4(p)) |
| 1991 | Indonesia | (Indonesia) Jakarta | 2–0 |
| 1992 | Perth | (Malaysia) Selangor | 2–0 |
| 1992 | Perth | Singapore | 1–1 |
| 1992 | Perth | (Germany) Werder Bremen | 3–2 |
| 1992 | Perth | (Republic of Ireland) Shelbourne | 0–0 |
| 1993 | Perth | Marconi-Fairfield | 1–2 |
| 1993 | Perth | (Greece) Iraklis | 4–2 |
| 1993 | Perth | (Malaysia) Sarawak | 0–0 |
| 1993 | Perth | Adelaide City | 0–4 |
| 1994 | Indonesia | Thailand | 1–1 |
| 1994 | Indonesia | (Myanmar) Burma | 4–1 |
| 1994 | Indonesia | (Malaysia) Harimau | 0–1 |

| Date | Venue | Opponent | Score |
|---|---|---|---|
| 1994 | Perth | (England) Sheffield United | 1–2 |
| 1994 | Perth | Australia U-23 | 1–1 |
| 1994 | Perth | Adelaide City | 3–0 |
| 1995 | Perth | (Japan) Cerezo Osaka | 1–4 |
| 1995 | Indonesia | (Indonesia) Medan Jaya | 1–2 |
| 1995 | Indonesia | (Indonesia) Pelita Jaya | 0–0 |
| 1995 | Indonesia | (Indonesia) PSMS Medan | 2–1 |
| 1995 | Perth | (England) West Ham United | 2–2 (5–3(p)) |
| 1995 | Perth | (England) Nottingham Forest | 2–1 |
| 1995 | Perth | Adelaide City | 1–3 |
| 1996 | Perth | Indonesia | 2–2 (3–1(p)) |
| 1996 | Perth | Perth Glory | 0–2 |
| 1997 | Perth | Singapore | 2–0 |
| 1997 | (A) | (Malaysia) Sarawak | 2–4 |
| 1997 | (A) | (Malaysia) Bintulu | 4–1 |
| 1998 | Perth | (England) West Ham Academy | 2–4 |
| 1998 | Perth | Northern Spirit | 1–2 |
| 1998 | Perth | Perth Glory | 0–2 |

=== 2000s ===
| 6 November 2000 | Western Australia | 4–0 | Malaysia U-23 | Perth |
| | Robertson 10', 84' (pen.); Naglieri 36'; Syamsuri 37' (o.g.) | Report | | Stadium: E&D Litis Stadium; Attendance: ~150; Referee: Allan Dix |

| 28 January 2001 | Western Australia | 0–2 | (Serbia and Montenegro) Red Star Belgrade | Perth |
| | | Report | Pjanović 4'; Stevanović 90' | Stadium: E&D Litis Stadium; Attendance: 3,500; Referee: Eddie Lennie |

| 29 February 2001 | Western Australia | 2–1 | (Malaysia) Sarawak | Perth |
| | Robertson 61'; White 66' | Report | Amit 80' | Stadium: E&D Litis Stadium |

| 9 March 2002 Centenary Challenge | South Australia | 0–0 | Western Australia | Adelaide |
| | | Report | | Stadium: Hindmarsh Stadium; Attendance: ~1,000 |

| 10 November 2002 | Western Australia | 2–3 | Perth Glory | Perth |
| | Oliveira 82'; Howarth 84' | Report | Naglieri 13', 22'; Despotovski 90+' | Stadium: Perth Oval; Attendance: ~1,100 |

| 9 February 2003 | Western Australia | 0–4 | Perth Glory | Perth |
| | | Report | Danze 8', 77'; Hassell 41'; Tarka 80+' Note: 2 x 40 minute halves. | Stadium: Litis Stadium; Referee: Stephen Muldoon |

| 16 November 2003 | Western Australia | 0–1 | Iraq | Perth |
| | | Report: | | Stadium: Arena Joondalup; Attendance: ~2,800; Referee: Eddie Lennie |

| 22 November 2003 | Western Australia | 0–4 | Iraq | Albany |
| | | Report | Swadi (?); Ali 38'; Manajid (?); Talaa 89' | Stadium: Collingwood Park; Attendance: ~1,500; Referee: Angelo Nardi |

| 18 June 2008 | Western Australia | 3–2 | Perth Glory | Perth |
| | Bulloch 25', 65'; Jukic 74' | Report | Skorich 54'; Griffiths 73' | Stadium: Litis Stadium; Attendance: 600; Referee: Stephen Gregory |

| 25 June 2008 Friendship Cup | East Java All-Province U-23 (Indonesia) | 2–0 | Western Australia | Surabaya, Indonesia |
| | Gunawan 58'; Angga 90+' | Report | | Stadium: Gelora 10 November Stadium; ? Gelora Deltras Sidoargo Stadium; Attendance: 1,000; Referee: Aji Santoso |

| 11 October 2008 Stratco Cup | South Australia | 3–0 | Western Australia | Adelaide |
| | Bugeja 19'; Karlovic 36'; Aguis 58' | Report | | Stadium: Marden Sports Complex; Referee: Regis Queffelc |

| 7 March 2009 Stratco Cup | Western Australia | 4–2 | South Australia | Perth |
| | Naglieri 34' (?); Brown 48'; Onoforo 51' | Report | Matricianni 68'; Bugeja 90' | Stadium: nib Stadium; Attendance: 1,048; Referee: Steven Gregory |

=== 2010s ===
| 28 July 2010 Call to Arms Cup | Western Australia | 1–3 | Perth Glory | Perth |
| | Oliveria 73' | Report | Sterjovski 45'; Vittiglia 90+1'; Neville 90+2' | Stadium: E&D Litis Stadium; Attendance: 3,121; Referee: Mathew Cheeseman |

| 5 July 2011 | Western Australia | 4–9 | Perth Glory | Perth |
| | Morgan 30'; Pritchard 63'; Barlow (?); Kay (?) | Report | Dodd 19', 45'; McGarry 24'; Risdon 56'; Vittiglia 57', 79'; Taggart (?); Amphlett 90' | Stadium: Dorrien Gardens; Attendance: 1,589; Referee: David Costello |

| 22 August 2012 | Western Australia | 0–3 | Perth Glory | Perth |
| | | | Smeltz 9'; Makarounas 17'; Makeche 72' | Stadium: Intiga Stadium; Attendance: 1,500; Referee: Mathew Cheeseman |

| 12 September 2012 | Western Australia | 0–1 | Perth Glory | Perth |
| | | | Dodd 2' | Stadium: Intiga Stadium; Referee: Mathew Cheeseman |

| 21 August 2013 Call to Arms Cup | Western Australia | 1–3 | Perth Glory | Perth |
| | Knight 3' | Report | McGarry 50' (pen.); De Silva 84'; Makeche 88' | Stadium: Intiga Stadium; Attendance: ~2,000; Referee: David Bruce |

| 13 August 2014 Call to Arms Cup | Western Australia | 2–1 | Perth Glory | Perth |
| | Solomons 71'; Boi 84' | Report | Sidnei 85' | Stadium: Dalmatinac Park; Attendance: ~800; Referee: Adam Fielding |

| 19 August 2015 Call to Arms Cup | Western Australia | 0–1 | Perth Glory | Perth |
| | | Report | Marinković 27' | Stadium: Dorrien Gardens; Attendance: ~800; Referee: David Bruce |

| 15 October 2015 | Western Australia | 2–0 | (Western Australia) WA State Amateur Team | Perth |
| | Marulanda 28'; Kay 56' | Source | | Stadium: Dorrien Gardens; Referee: Steven Gregory |

| 17 August 2016 Heritage Cup | Western Australia | 0–1 | Perth Glory | Perth |
| 19:00 AWST | | Report | Harold 45+2' | Stadium: Inglewood Stadium; Attendance: ~500; Referee: Adam Fielding |

| 2 August 2017 | Western Australia | 0–3 | Australia U–20 | Perth |
| 19:00 | | Source | Najjar 70'; Sette 79'; Puflett 90' | Stadium: Perth Plasterboard Centre Stadium |

| 8 August 2017 | Western Australia | 5–3 | Singapore U–19 | Perth |
| 19:00 | Smith 6'; Sabatini 25' (pen.); Salmon 50', 71', 90+2' | Report | Hami 45+1' (pen.); Taufik 60'; Sahrin 86' | Stadium: Dorrien Gardens; Referee: David Bruce |

| 13 September 2017 | Western Australia | 1–1 | Perth Glory | Perth |
| 19:00 AWST | Andres 28' | Report | Taggart 36' | Stadium: Hartfield Park; Attendance: 600+ Referee: David Bruce |

| 1 August 2018 | Western Australia | 2–5 | Perth Glory | Perth |
| 19:00 AWST | C.Saldaris 79'; Sinclair 90+1' | Report | Davidson 5'; Castro 12'; Brimmer 42'; Mustafa 59'; Harold 63' | Stadium: Perth Plasterboard Centre Stadium |

| 13 September 2018 Challenge Cup | Western Australia | 1–2 | Perth Glory | Perth |
| | Kay 73' | Report | Mrcela 56'; Chianese 85' | Stadium: Dalmatinac Park |

| 31 July 2019 Challenge Cup | Western Australia | 1–5 | Perth Glory | Perth |
| 19:00 | O'Connell 20' | Report | Fornaroli 16'; Tratt 27'; Chianese 32'; Franjic 61'; Brooks 74' | Stadium: Frank Drago Reserve; Referee: Adam Fielding |

=== 2020s ===
| 2 October 2021 Gold Fields Challenge Cup | Western Australia | 1–0 | Perth Glory | Perth |
| 15:00 | Santich 83' | Report | | Stadium: Percy Doyle Reserve; Referee: Matthew Southern |

| 27 September 2022 Gold Fields Challenge Cup | Western Australia | 0–6 | Perth Glory | Perth |
| 15:00 | | Report | Azubel 15' (pen.), 30'; Zimarino 41', 53'; Jelacic 75'; Colli 82' | Stadium: Kingsway Reserve; Referee: Shane Skinner |

| 24 September 2023 Gold Fields Challenge Cup | Western Australia | 0–3 | Perth Glory | Perth |
| 18:00 | | Report | Williams 79', 88'; Martis 82' | Stadium: Sam Kerr Football Centre; Referee: Shane Skinner |

| 25 September 2024 Gold Fields Challenge Cup | Western Australia | 0–1 | Perth Glory | Perth |
| 19:00 | | Report | Mathiang 80' | Stadium: Sam Kerr Football Centre; Referee: Niall Gillmor |

| 9 July 2025 International Cup | Western Australia | 0–2 | (Indonesia) Persebaya Surabaya | Perth |
| | | Report | Rivera 61'; Rizky 90+3' | Stadium: Sam Kerr Football Centre; Attendance: 1,500; Referee: Niall Gilmor |

| 17 September 2025 Challenge Cup | Western Australia | Cancelled | Perth Glory | Perth |
| 18:30 | | Cancellation | | Stadium: Dorrien Gardens |

| 19 September 2026 | Western Australia | 1–0 | Tasmania | Perth |
| 18:00 | Boland | Report | | Stadium: Inglewood Stadium |

| 10 October 2026 Challenge Cup | Western Australia | 0–2 | Perth Glory | Perth |
| 19:00 | | Report | Lawrence 34'; Kuzamba 75' | Stadium: Kingsway Reserve; Referee: Finn Johnson |

| 15 November 2026 | Persebaya Surabaya (Indonesia) | 4–3 | Western Australia | Surabaya, Indonesia |
| 19:30 UTC+7 | Mitrevski 63'; Alfan 64'; Alex 72'; Gledson 90' | Report | Nilson 40'; Fearnall 76'; Flores 84' | Stadium: Gelora Bung Tomo Stadium |

== Women's State Team ==
| 11 January 1980 1980 AFC Women's Championship GS | India S | 2–0 | Western Australia | Calicut, India |
| | Mullick 17'; Dutta 27' | | | Stadium: Calicut EMS Stadium |

| 13 January 1980 1980 AFC Women's Championship GS | India N | 0–3 | Western Australia | Calicut, India |
| | | | Pettitt,, | Stadium: Calicut EMS Stadium |

| 14 January 1980 1980 AFC Women's Championship GS | Western Australia | 1–0 | Malaysia | Calicut, India |
| | Pettitt 10' | | | Stadium: Calicut EMS Stadium |

| 16 January 1980 1980 AFC Women's Championship GS | Taiwan | 2–0 | Western Australia | Calicut, India |
| | Chou 7'; Sandra (o.g.) | | | Stadium: Calicut EMS Stadium |

| 18 January 1980 1980 AFC Women's Championship GS | Hong Kong | 1–0 | Western Australia | Calicut, India |
| | Daniel 4' | | | Stadium: Calicut EMS Stadium |

| 19 January 1980 1980 AFC Women's Championship SF | Taiwan | 5–0 | Western Australia | Calicut, India |
| | Su-Ching; Chao; Shu-Yuen; Chou; ?? | | | Stadium: Calicut EMS Stadium |

| October 2018 Challenge Cup | Western Australia | 1–3 | Perth Glory | Perth |
| | Stonehill 33' (pen.) | Report | Cook 14', 60'; Galabadaarachchi 40' | Stadium: Coker Park |

| 1 November 2019 Challenge Cup | Western Australia | 0–4 | Perth Glory | Perth |
| | | Source | Moreno 3'; Doeglas 7'; McKenna 57', 66' | Stadium: Percy Doyle Reserve |

| 24 September 2023 Gold Fields Challenge Cup | Western Australia | 0–4 | Perth Glory | Perth |
| 16:00 | | Report | Sakalis 13'; Farrow 26', 33', 34' | Stadium: Sam Kerr Football Centre; Referee: Shane Skinner |

| 13 October 2024 Gold Fields Challenge Cup | Western Australia | 2–5 | Perth Glory | Perth |
| 13:00 AWST | Sakairi 81'; Thew 88' (o.g.) | Report | Brown 2'; Cassidy 29'; Hollar 53', 54'; Sunaga 90+3' | Stadium: Dorrien Gardens; Referee: Niall Gilmour |

| 19 October 2025 Challenge Cup | Western Australia | 2–0 | Perth Glory | Perth |
| 15:00 AWST | Doeglas 43' (pen.); Leota 90+2' | Report | | Stadium: Dorrien Gardens; Referee: Jess Bird |

| 10 October 2026 Challenge Cup | Western Australia | 2–4 | Perth Glory | Perth |
| 17:00 AWST | Doeglas 24'; Flannery 54' | Report | Thew 12'; Abdul-Massih 16'; Lincoln 28', 50' | Stadium: Kingsway Reserve; Referee: Jess Byrd |
