= Yolanda de Sousa =

Indian footballer and artist

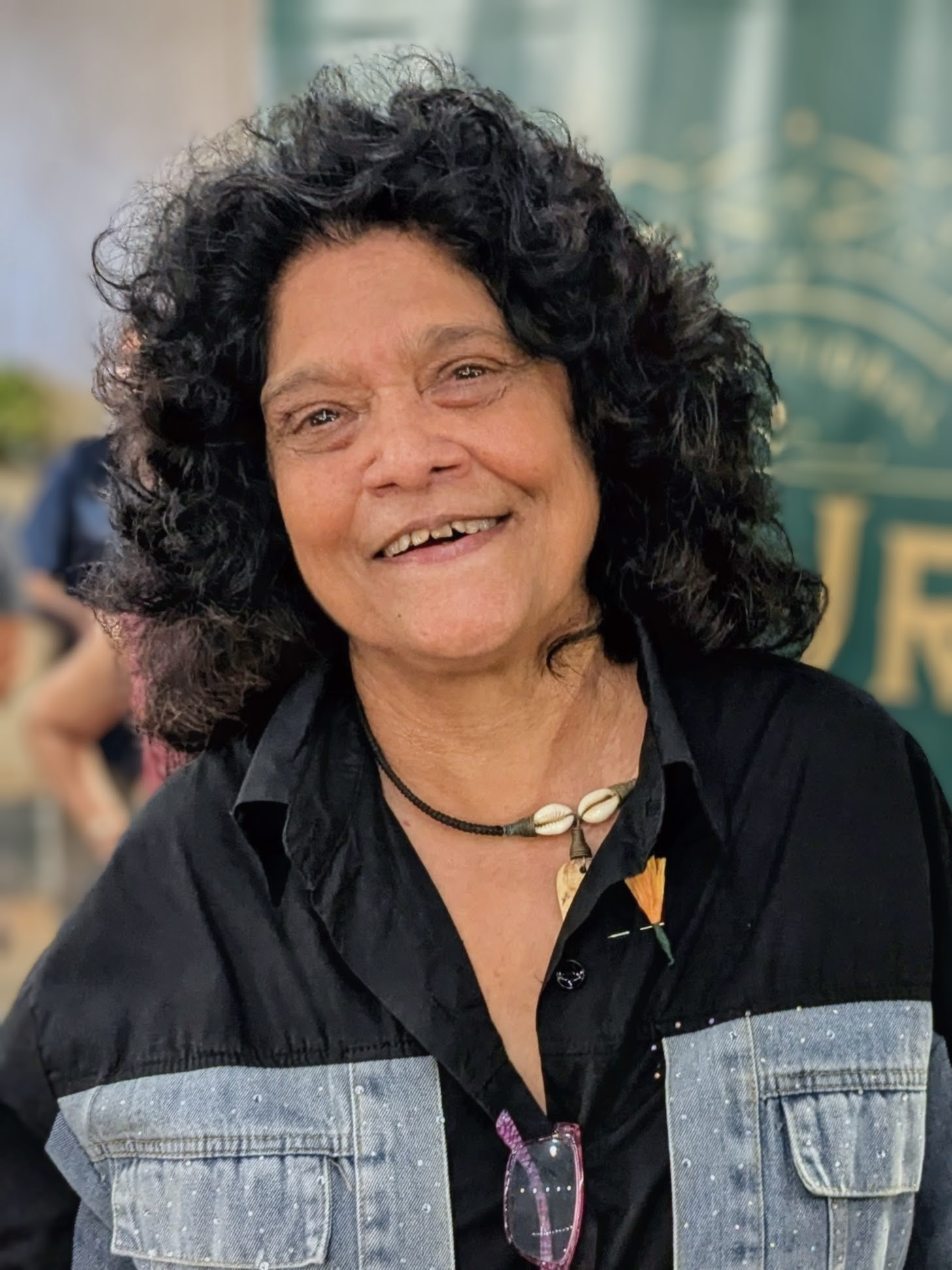
- de Sousa in 2025

Personal information
- Full name: Yolanda de Sousa Kammermeier
- Date of birth: 1955 (age 70–71)
- Place of birth: Calangute, Goa, Portuguese India (now India)
- Position: Centre-forward

Youth career
- Calangute Women’s FC

Senior career*
Years	Team	Apps	(Gls)
1975–1979	Calcutta Women's FC		
- Goa
- Bengal

International career
1976–1981	India		
- * Club domestic league appearances and goals

Yolanda de Sousa Kammermeier (born 1955) is an Indian former footballer and artist, who played as a centre-forward for the Indian national team. She was the captain of the Indian team that finished as runners-up in the 1980 AFC Women's Championship.

De Sousa is widely known for being the first Indian woman to score an international hat-trick. She achieved this feat in 1978 during a tournament in Calcutta against Singapore. She is nicknamed the "Hat-trick Queen" for this accomplishment.

== Early life ==
Yolanda de Sousa was born to Rita Augusta, a painter, and Juveniano, a footballer who played professionally for Tata sports club, Bombay, and worked at the Taj Mahal Palace Hotel. She studied at the Little Flower of Jesus High School, Calangute, and later completed a Bachelor of Fine Arts in painting from the Goa College of Art.

== Football career ==
=== Domestic career ===
De Sousa is from Calangute in Goa. She grew up with seven sisters and one brother, and her family was very supportive of her playing football. Her brother, in particular, would wake her for practice, prepare her football kit, and attend her matches. She began her career playing for the Calangute Women's Football Club.

In 1975, she moved to Calcutta (now Kolkata) and joined the Calcutta Women's Football Club (CWFC). With CWFC, she won the Stafford Challenge Cup in 1976, where her team defeated a club from Pune in the final.

She also represented the state teams of Goa and Bengal in domestic competitions. She captained the Goan team to their first victory in the women's national championships.

=== International career ===
De Sousa played as a centre-forward for the Indian national team and served as its captain.

In 1978, she participated in the Women's International Football Tournament in Calcutta, which has been described as an unofficial Asian Cup. During this tournament, she scored the first-ever international hat-trick by an Indian woman, in a match against Singapore.

De Sousa later captained the Indian team at the 1980 AFC Women's Championship in Calicut. India finished the tournament as runners-up, earning a silver medal. De Sousa was the joint top-scorer of the tournament.

De Sousa retired from football in 1979.

== Art career ==
De Sousa is also a professional artist and is known by her married name, Yolanda de Sousa Kammermeier. She runs the art gallery, Galeria de Belas Artes at Castelo Vermelho in Calangute, Goa.

== Personal life ==
De Sousa played hockey before she played football.

Following her playing career, she was employed by the Sports Authority of Goa (SAG).

As of 2017, she resides in her hometown of Calangute, Goa. Her husband is a German named Rudolf Ludwig Kammermeier.

== Football career statistics ==
=== International goals ===
Scores and results list India's goal tally first.

List of international goals scored by Yolanda de Sousa
No.	Date	Venue	Opponent	Result	Competition
1.	12 January 1980	Calicut EMS Stadium, Calicut, India	Hong Kong	2–0	1980 AFC Women's Championship
2.	19 January 1980	Calicut EMS Stadium, Calicut, India	Hong Kong	3–1	1980 AFC Women's Championship
