= Kuntala Ghosh Dastidar =

Indian football coach and former footballer

Kuntala Ghosh
Personal information
- Full name: Kuntala Ghosh Dastidar
- Date of birth: 23 June 1962 (age 64)
- Place of birth: Calcutta, West Bengal, India

Senior career*
Years	Team	Apps	(Gls)
- Bengal

International career
1980–1983	India	?	(?)
- * Club domestic league appearances and goals

Kuntala Ghosh Dastidar (born 23 June 1962) is a former Indian women's football player. She captained the Indian team that played the 1981 World Cup. It does not count in statistics because at that time FIFA did not recognise the women's game. Some of the other players who played in the 1981 World Cup are Shanti Mullick, Minati Roy and Judy D'Silva. Kuntala later took up coaching and also became a football referee. She started 'Bandhu Collective' to coach the players from under-privileged families, including from the Red Light areas.

== Early life ==
Kuntala home was near the Vivekananda Park and she used to go regularly to the park along with her uncle Sujit Ghosh Dastidar. When she was young, she got an offer from renowned Satyajit Ray to act as ‘Durga’ in a movie but encouraged by her uncle she preferred football and politely refused the offer. In June 1975, Arati Bannerjee, wife of PK Bannerjee, organised a football match for women for the first time and Kuntala was part of the 16-member team that was selected from the 150 that turned out that day. Many of them, including Kuntala, went on to play for the National team. She worked and played for Railways.

== Career ==
- She was part of the Indian team that finished second in the Asian Championship in 1979 and 1983. In 1981, India was placed third.
- She was part of Asian All Stars team in 1981 along with Shanti Mullick and Shukla Dutta.
- She coached the senior Bengal team in 1994–95, 1998–99 and 2000–02.

== Career statistics ==
=== International goals ===
Scores and results list India's goal tally first.

List of international goals scored by Kuntala Ghosh Dastidar
No.	Date	Venue	Opponent	Result	Competition
1.	10 June 1981	Mong Kok Stadium, Mong Kok, Hong Kong	Philippines	8–0	1981 AFC Women's Championship
