= 1971 Pesta Sukan Cup =

Tournament details
- Host country: Singapore
- Dates: 23–28 August
- Teams: 8 (from 1 confederation)
- Venue: 1 (in 1 host city)

Final positions
- Champions: India; South Vietnam; (Title shared) (1st title)

Tournament statistics
- Matches played: 10
- Goals scored: 32 (3.2 per match)
- Top scorer: (India) Mohammed Habib (4 goals)

The 1971 Pesta Sukan Cup was an international football tournament held in Singapore from 23 to 28 August 1971. India and South Vietnam were declared joint champions as the final ended in a 0–0 draw.

== Participating nations ==
Country	Appearance
Singapore (Host)	1st
South Korea XI	1st
India	1st
South Vietnam	1st
Malaysia	1st
Indonesia	1st
Philippines	1st
Thailand	1st

== Knockout stage ==
Quarter-finals
23 April
India	2
Indonesia	1
23 April
Malaysia	2 (5)
Singapore	2 (4)
24 April
Thailand	1
Philippines	0
24 April
South Vietnam	1
South Korea XI	0

Semi-finals
26 April
India	6
Malaysia	0
26 April
South Vietnam	2
Thailand	1

Final
28 April
India	0
South Vietnam	0

== Quarter-finals ==
23 August 1971

India	2–1 (a.e.t.)	Indonesia
Habib 84' (pen.), 108'	Report	Suabi 52'

Jalan Besar Stadium

23 August 1971

Malaysia	2–2 (a.e.t.)	Singapore
Bakar 50'; Bhawandi (?)	Report	M. Krishnan 16'; Sockalingam Rajagopal 91'
Penalties
	5–4

Jalan Besar Stadium
Attendance: 10000

24 August 1971

Thailand	1–0	Philippines
Nut Tumerongvejt 36'	Report

Jalan Besar Stadium
Referee: Bishan Singh (Singapore)

24 August 1971

South Vietnam	1–0	South Korea XI
Tran Tiet Anh 87'	Report

Jalan Besar Stadium

== Semi-finals ==
26 August 1971

India	6–0	Malaysia
Doraiswamy Nataraj 25'; Swapan Sengupta 50'; Bhowmick 40', 53'; Habib 60', 67'	Report

Jalan Besar Stadium

26 August 1971

South Vietnam	2–1	Thailand
Trần Văn Xinh 7', 48' (pen.)	Report	Sithiporn 47' (pen.)

Jalan Besar Stadium

== Final ==
28 August 1971

India	0–0 (a.e.t.)	South Vietnam
	Report

Jalan Besar Stadium

== Consolation Semi-finals ==
27 August 1971

Singapore	3–2	Indonesia
Lim Lye Huat 26'; Kassim 52' (pen.); Ramasamy Roy Krishnan 66'	Report	Kadir 38'; S. Rihal 81'

Jalan Besar Stadium

27 August 1971

South Korea XI	3–1	Philippines
Kang Chong Tae 1'; Kim Chin Kuk 50', 53'	Report	Tomás Lozano

Jalan Besar Stadium

== Consolation Final ==
28 August 1971

Singapore	1–4	South Korea XI
Quah Kim Lye 11'	Report	Ahn Won Nam 15', 73'; Lee Chung-whee 74', 85'

Jalan Besar Stadium

== Champion ==
1971 Pesta Sukan Cup

India
First title

1971 Pesta Sukan Cup

South Vietnam
First title
