= Naga Devahastin na Ayudhya =

Thai public educator (1901–1969)

Naga Devahastin na Ayudhya (Thai: นาค เทพหัสดิน ณ อยุธยา, also spelled Nak Thephasadin; 17 September 1901 – 11 July 1969) was a Thai teacher and public education administrator. He graduated from Reading University in the United Kingdom on a government scholarship and served various posts in the Ministry of Education. He did foundational work in the Department of Physical Education, and served as principal of the Central Physical Education School, the precursor to the Thailand National Sports University. He is best known for introducing the martial art of krabi–krabong to physical education teaching. He became Permanent Secretary of the Ministry of Education from 1957 to 1961, and also served as Secretary-General of the Teacher's Council of Thailand (Khurusapha), from 1961 to 1967.
