= 1983 AFC Women's Championship =

Tournament details
- Host country: Thailand
- Dates: 10–17 April
- Teams: 6 (from 1 confederation)
- Venue: 1 (in 1 host city)

Final positions
- Champions: Thailand (1st title)
- Runners-up: India
- Third place: Malaysia

The Asian Football Confederation's 1983 AFC Women's Championship was the fifth AFC Women's Championship. It was held from April 1983 in Thailand. Participating members were Thailand, India, Malaysia, Singapore, Hong Kong, Philippines. The tournament was won by Thailand in the final against India.

The tournament was not recognized by the AFC or FIFA at the time of its conduct.

Japan and Taiwan were expected to play but withdrew on short notice.

== Format ==
Eight nations were willing to take part; there was a draw with two groups. One group consisted of Singapore, Malaysia, Japan and Taiwan, the other of Hong Kong, India, Thailand and Philippines.

After Taiwan and Japan withdrew from the tournament, the six remaining teams were put in a single group and played a single round-robin tournament.

== Group stage ==
Team	Pld	W	D	L	GF	GA	GD	Pts	Qualification
Thailand	5	5	0	0	22	1	+21	10	Advance to final
India	5	4	0	1	11	2	+9	8	Advance to final
Singapore	5	3	0	2	12	5	+7	6	Advance to third place play-off
Malaysia	5	2	0	3	7	16	−9	4	Advance to third place play-off
Philippines	5	1	0	4	2	16	−14	2	
Hong Kong	5	0	0	5	0	14	−14	0	

Source: RSSSF
10 April 1983

Thailand	8–0	Malaysia
Wanwilai Thongsa 2'; Udon Rajasri 6'; Anchalee Khaowlaung 21'; Wannipa Yeepracha 31'; Achara Aramsri; Nongyao Wongkasemsak

National Stadium, Bangkok
10 April 1983

India	5–0	Philippines
Mullick 3', 20' (?); Shukla Dutta (2x)

National Stadium, Bangkok
10 April 1983

Singapore	2–0	Hong Kong
Jacqueline Chan 24'; Maimun Wahab 40'

National Stadium, Bangkok

11 April 1983

India	1–0	Hong Kong
Mullick 13'

National Stadium, Bangkok
11 April 1983

Malaysia	1–0	Philippines
Normala Rashid 51'

National Stadium, Bangkok
11 April 1983

Thailand	3–0	Singapore
Wannipa Yeepracha 11'; Achara Aramsri 16'; Yupadee Chaisawad 53'

National Stadium, Bangkok

12 April 1983

India	3–0	Malaysia
Mullick 23', 30'; Shukla Dutta (?)

National Stadium, Bangkok
12 April 1983

Singapore	5–0	Philippines
Mona Fricke 9'; Maimun Wahab (??), 64'; Jacqueline Chan (??); Azizah Ahmed (??)

National Stadium, Bangkok
12 April 1983

Thailand	4–0	Hong Kong
Wanvilai Thongsa 5'; Udon Rajasri; Wannipa Yeepracha

National Stadium, Bangkok

14 April 1983

Philippines	2–0	Hong Kong
Laudeth Gonzalez 11', 84'

National Stadium, Bangkok
14 April 1983

Singapore	5–1	Malaysia
Roshimah Maing 16'; Maimun Wahab 29'; Rogayah Mohammad 41', 65'; Mona Fricke (??)		Normala Rashid 14'

National Stadium, Bangkok
14 April 1983

Thailand	2–1	India
Yupadee Chaisawad; Wannipha Yeepracha		Mullick 10'

National Stadium, Bangkok

15 April 1983

India	1–0	Singapore
Mullick 11' (pen.)	Report

National Stadium, Bangkok
15 April 1983

Malaysia	5–0	Hong Kong
Normala Rashid; Djamilah Buhari; Abu Hassan

National Stadium, Bangkok
15 April 1983

Thailand	5–0	Philippines
Wanvilai Thongsa; Achara Aramsri; Nongyao Wongkasemsak; Anchalee Khaowlaung

National Stadium, Bangkok

== Knockout stage ==
=== Third place play-off ===
17 April 1983

Malaysia	0–0	Singapore
Penalties
	5–4

National Stadium, Bangkok

=== Final ===
17 April 1983

Thailand	3–0	India
Wannipha Yeepracha 65'; Udorn Rajasri 69'; Yupadee Chaisawad 78'

National Stadium, Bangkok
Attendance: 5,000

== Winner ==
AFC Women's Championship
1983 winners

Thailand
First title
