= National Stadium (Thailand) =

Sports complex in Bangkok, Thailand

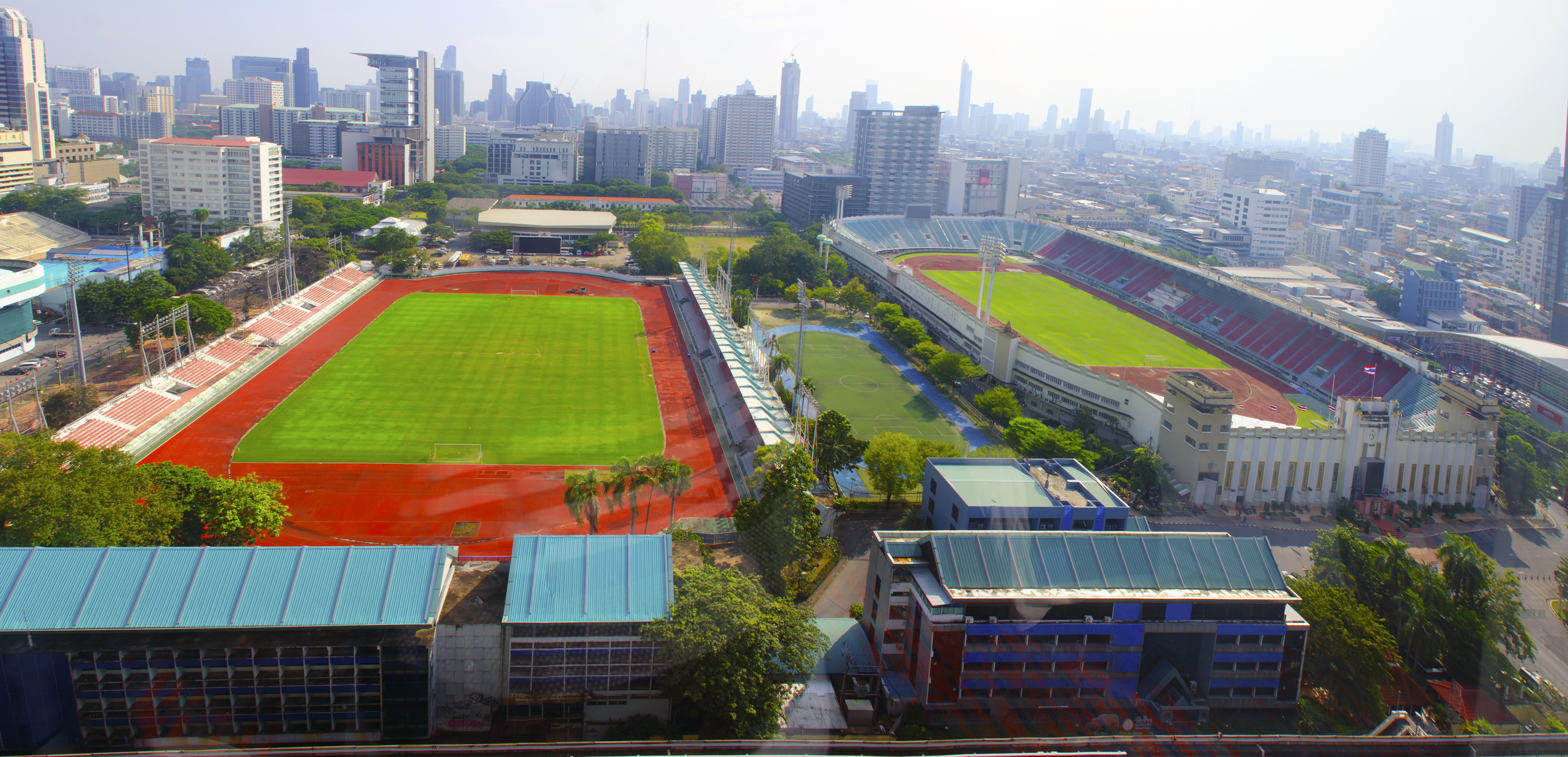
From right to left, Suphachalasai Stadium, the warm-up field, and Thephasadin Stadium. Nimibutr Gymnasium and Visutdrarom Swimming Pool are partially seen in the far left.

The National Stadium of Thailand (Thai: สนามกีฬาแห่งชาติ or กรีฑาสถานแห่งชาติ) is a sports complex located in Pathum Wan District, Bangkok. Founded in 1937 with the construction of Suphachalasai Stadium, its main venue, the complex has since expanded and now consists of multiple stadia and sporting facilities.

== History ==
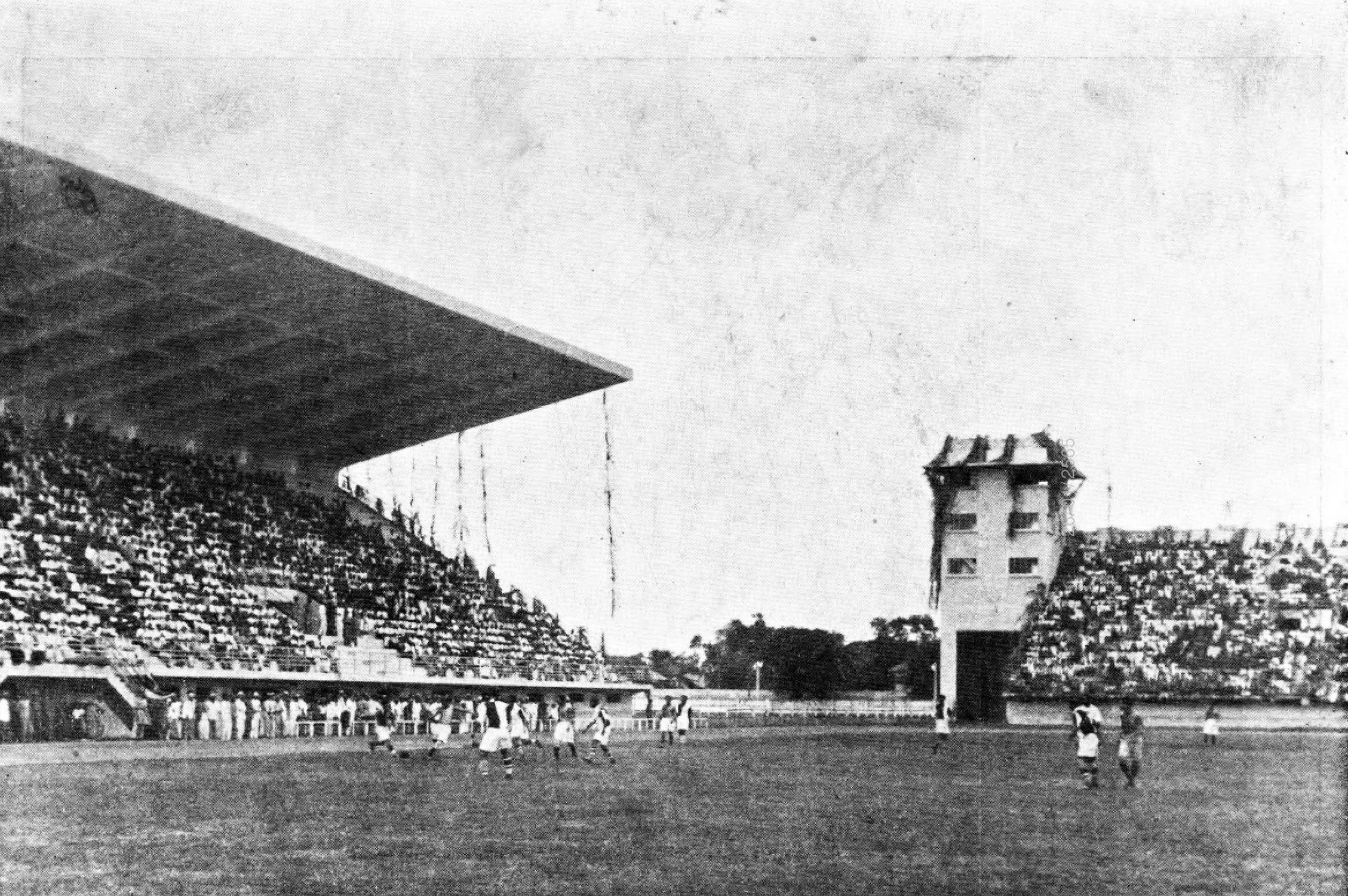
National Stadium in 1943

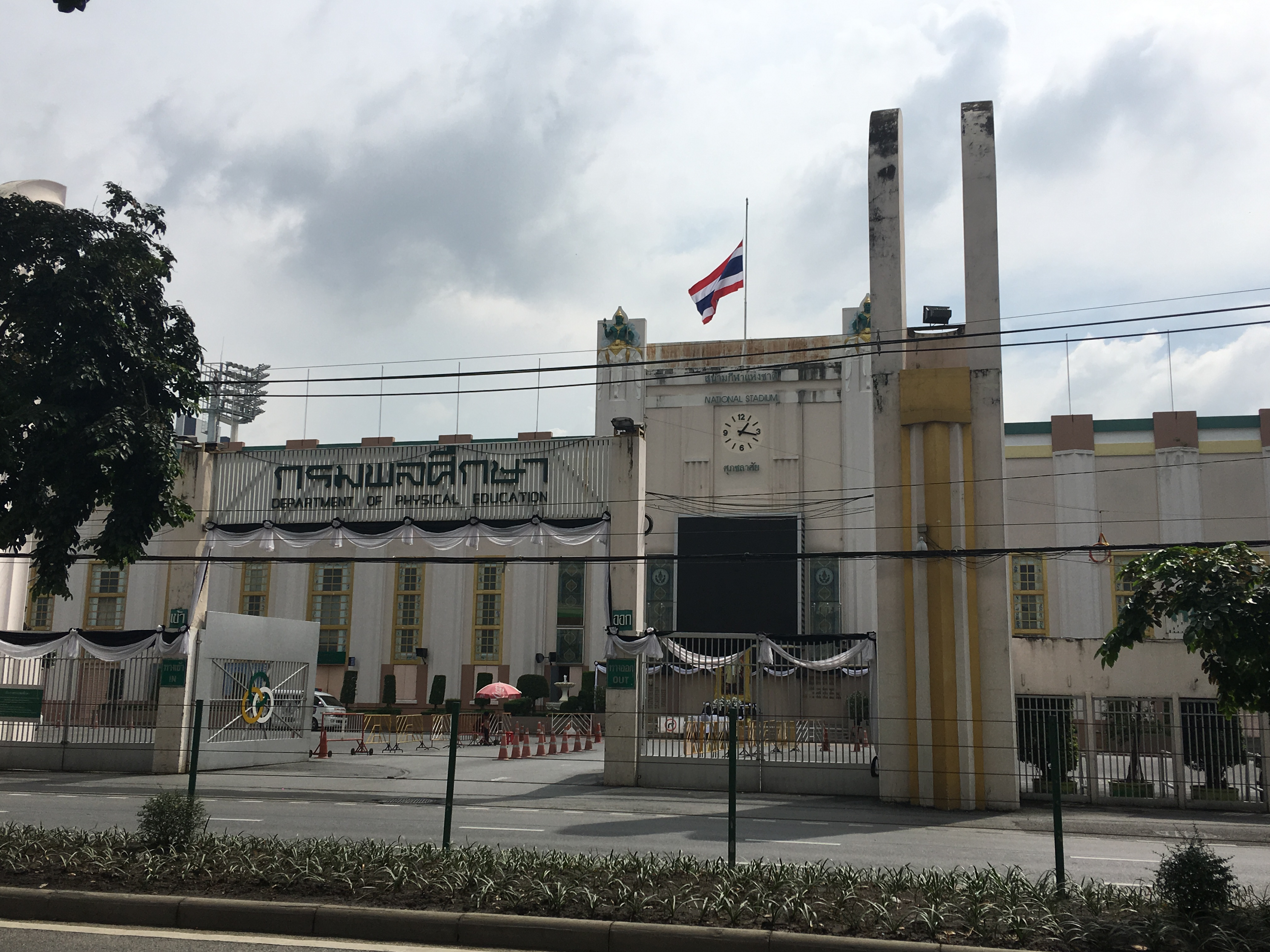
National Stadium in 2016

The stadium construction started in 1937 in the original area of Thai Windsor Palace that demolished in 1935. The Department of Physical Education entered into a 29-year lease agreement with Chulalongkorn University. First use of the stadium happened when King Ananda Mahidol presided over in the opening ceremony of 1938 men's athletics competition, which changed the venue from Sanam Luang.

== Stadium Facilities ==
=== Suphachalasai Stadium ===
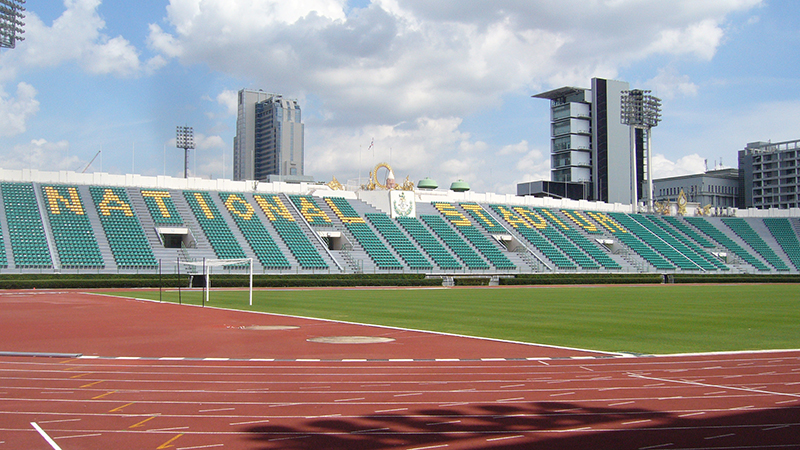
Suphachalasai Stadium

Suphachalasai Stadium is the majority part of the National Stadium. It is the multi-purpose stadium with track and field for athletic purposes, as well as a partial roof on one of its side. With its capacity of 19,793 for sport events and 35,000 for concerts, the stadium is being used to hold important matches such as the Thai FA Cup and Thai League Cup. The stadium named after Luang Supachalasai (Bung Supachalasai), considered the Father of Thai Sport and the first Director-General of Thai Department of Physical Education.

=== Thephasadin Stadium ===
Thephasadin Stadium was constructed in 1965 for the use in 1966 Asian Games as the Hockey venue, hence its original name, Hockey Field. It was renamed in 1983 in memory of Naga Devahastin na Ayudhya, former Acting Director-General of the Department of Physical Education. With its capacity of 6,378 seats, since then the venue turned a specific football venue.

=== Jindarat Stadium ===
Jindarat Stadium, constructed after the Pacific War, was formerly used as the outdoor stadium for medium-level sporting events and practicing purposes. It was originally named Ton Pho Stadium, but was renamed in 1983 in memorial of Jindarat (Jamlong Sawat-chuto), former director of the Office of Sports and Recreation Development.

=== Visutdrarom Swimming Pool ===
Visutdrarom Swimming Pool was constructed in 1961 under the term of director Kong Visudharomn. It was the Olympic-size swimming pool with two sides of stands, used for the competition and general practices. Originally named the Olympic Pool, it was renamed in memorial of the director who organized the construction.

=== Nimibutr Stadium ===
Nimibutr Stadium, opened in 1963 is an indoor arena used for sports including boxing, badminton, gymnastics, futsal, basketball and handball.

=== Jhanthana-Yingyong Gymnasium ===
Jhanthana-Yingyong Gymnasium was built in 1965.

== See also ==
- Rajamangala National Stadium

| Preceded by Shahid Shiroudi Stadium (Iran) Tehran | AFC Asian Cup; Final Venue; 1972 | Succeeded by Azadi Stadium (Iran) Tehran |
| Preceded by Government Stadium; Hong Kong | AFC Women's Championship; Final Venue; 1983 | Succeeded by Mong Kok Stadium; Hong Kong |
