= 1980 AFC Women's Championship =

Tournament details
- Host country: India
- City: Calicut
- Dates: 11–20 January
- Teams: 6
- Venue: EMS Stadium

Final positions
- Champions: Republic of China (2nd title)
- Runners-up: India S

Tournament statistics
- Matches played: 19

The 1980 AFC Women's Championship was the 3rd edition of the AFC Women's Championship (now the AFC Women's Asian Cup). The tournament was hosted by India (with two teams India N and India S) and was the first time the competition was held in South Asia. It was originally scheduled to be held in 1979, but was eventually held between 11 and 20 January 1980. All matches were played at the EMS Stadium in Calicut (now Kozhikode), Kerala.

The tournament was won by the Republic of China (Taiwan) for the second time.

== Venue ==
All matches were held at the EMS Stadium in Calicut (now Kozhikode), Kerala.

Kerala	Calicut
Calicut is located in Kerala
Calicut is located in Kerala	EMS Stadium
Calicut is located in Kerala	Capacity: 53,000

== Entrants ==
ALFC members	Invitees
Republic of China; India (two sides) (Note: India was represented by two sides India S and India N. The two Indian teams were labelled "India A" and "India B". Subsequently, they were relabelled as India Seniors (India S) and India Novices (India N). An alternative label was India South and India North.) (Host); Hong Kong; Malaysia	Western Australia (Note: Australian regional representative side)

== Group stage ==
Team	Pld	W	D	L	GF	GA	GD	Pts
Republic of China	5	4	1	0	12	0	+12	9
India S	5	3	2	0	5	0	+5	8
Western Australia	5	2	0	3	4	5	−1	4
Hong Kong	5	2	0	3	3	7	−4	4
Malaysia	5	1	1	3	4	5	−1	3
India N	5	1	0	4	1	12	−11	2

Source: RSSSF
11 January 1980

India S	2–0	Western Australia
Mullick 17'; Shukla Dutta 27'

Calicut EMS Stadium, Calicut

12 January 1980

Republic of China	5–0	India N

Calicut EMS Stadium, Calicut
12 January 1980

India S	2–0	Hong Kong
Yolanda D'Souza 7'; ?? 12' (o.g.)

Calicut EMS Stadium, Calicut

13 January 1980

Republic of China	2–0	Malaysia
Chou

Calicut EMS Stadium, Calicut
13 January 1980

India N	0–3	Western Australia
		Judy Pettitt

Calicut EMS Stadium, Calicut

14 January 1980

Western Australia	1–0	Malaysia
Judy Pettitt 10'

Calicut EMS Stadium, Calicut
14 January 1980

India N	1–0	Hong Kong
Ayona 44'

Calicut EMS Stadium, Calicut

15 January 1980

Republic of China	0–0	India S

Calicut EMS Stadium, Calicut
15 January 1980

Hong Kong	2–1	Malaysia
Poon Shui-Chun; Yung Fung-Ling		??

Calicut EMS Stadium, Calicut

16 January 1980

India N	0–1	India S
		Shukla Dutta 59'

Calicut EMS Stadium, Calicut
16 January 1980

Republic of China	2–0	Western Australia
Chou 7'; Sandra o.g.'

Calicut EMS Stadium, Calicut

17 January 1980

Republic of China	3–0	Hong Kong

Calicut EMS Stadium, Calicut
17 January 1980

India N	0–3	Malaysia

Calicut EMS Stadium, Calicut

18 January 1980

Hong Kong	1–0	Western Australia
Linda Daniel 4'

Calicut EMS Stadium, Calicut
18 January 1980

Malaysia	0–0	India S

Calicut EMS Stadium, Calicut

== Knockout stage ==
Semi-finals
19 January
Republic of China	5
Western Australia	0
19 January
India S	3
Hong Kong	1

Final
20 January
Republic of China	2
India S	0
Third place
20 January
Hong Kong
Western Australia

=== Semi-final ===
19 January 1980

Republic of China	5–0	Western Australia
Ho Su-Ching; Chao; Chuang Shu-Yuen; Chou; ??

Calicut EMS Stadium, Calicut

19 January 1980

India S	3–1	Hong Kong
Shukla Dutta; Sushma Das; Yolanda D'Souza		Poon Shui-Chun

Calicut EMS Stadium, Calicut

=== Third place match ===
20 January 1980

Hong Kong	cancelled (Note: The match was cancelled as Hong Kong had already booked their flights home before kickoff, failing which they would have had to stay in India for a further four days for the next available flight to Hong Kong, which would have been impossible due to scheduling and logistical issues.)	Western Australia

Calicut EMS Stadium, Calicut

=== Final ===
20 January 1980

Republic of China	2–0	India S
Chuang Haiu-li 15'; Yang Hsiou-Chih 55'

Calicut EMS Stadium, Calicut

== Winner ==
AFC Women's Championship
1979 winners

Republic of China
Second title
