= Shanti Mullick =

Indian footballer

Personal information
- Full name: Shanti Mullick
- Date of birth: 1964
- Place of birth: Kolkata, West Bengal, India
- Position: Forward

Senior career*
Years	Team	Apps	(Gls)
- Bengal

International career
1980–1983	India	?	(14)

Managerial career
- 1996–1997: Bengal
- * Club domestic league appearances and goals

Shanti Mullick is an Indian former women's footballer who played as a forward for the India women's national football team. Mullick is the first Indian women's footballer to receive the Arjuna Award, the second-highest Indian sports award.

== Career ==
=== Football ===
Mullick was born in Kalighat, Kolkata, West Bengal and her father was also a footballer who served in the military.

Mullick represented India at the AFC Women's Championships where the team reached the finals twice and finished as runners-up in the 1980 and 1983 editions. She played for the national team managed by legendary Sushil Bhattacharya. Her team also finished in third place in the 1981 edition. She captained the Indian team in 1983. Mullick was the first women's footballer to score a hat-trick for India in a 5–0 victory over Singapore in the 1981 AFC Women's Championship.

Following her retirement, she runs a football academy and coaches youth women's footballers.

=== Field hockey ===
Mullick also played field hockey from 1986 to 1994 while posted at Eastern Railway.

== Career statistics ==
=== International goals ===
Scores and results list India's goal tally first.

List of international goals scored by Shanti Mullick
No.	Date	Venue	Opponent	Result	Competition
1.	8 June 1981	Mong Kok Stadium, Mong Kok, Hong Kong	Singapore	5–0	1981 AFC Women's Championship
2.	8 June 1981	Mong Kok Stadium, Mong Kok, Hong Kong	Singapore	5–0	1981 AFC Women's Championship
3.	8 June 1981	Mong Kok Stadium, Mong Kok, Hong Kong	Singapore	5–0	1981 AFC Women's Championship
4.	8 June 1981	Mong Kok Stadium, Mong Kok, Hong Kong	Singapore	5–0	1981 AFC Women's Championship
5.	10 June 1981	Mong Kok Stadium, Mong Kok, Hong Kong	Philippines	8–0	1981 AFC Women's Championship
6.	10 June 1981	Mong Kok Stadium, Mong Kok, Hong Kong	Philippines	8–0	1981 AFC Women's Championship
7.	10 April 1983	National Stadium, Bangkok, Thailand	Philippines	5–0	1983 AFC Women's Championship
8.	10 April 1983	National Stadium, Bangkok, Thailand	Philippines	5–0	1983 AFC Women's Championship
9.	10 April 1983	National Stadium, Bangkok, Thailand	Philippines	5–0	1983 AFC Women's Championship
10.	11 April 1983	National Stadium, Bangkok, Thailand	Hong Kong	1–0	1983 AFC Women's Championship
11.	12 April 1983	National Stadium, Bangkok, Thailand	Malaysia	3–0	1983 AFC Women's Championship
12.	12 April 1983	National Stadium, Bangkok, Thailand	Malaysia	3–0	1983 AFC Women's Championship
13.	14 April 1983	National Stadium, Bangkok, Thailand	Thailand	1–2	1983 AFC Women's Championship
14.	15 April 1983	National Stadium, Bangkok, Thailand	Singapore	1–0	1983 AFC Women's Championship

== Honours ==
=== Player ===
India

- AFC Women's Championship runner-up: 1980, 1983; third place: 1981

=== Manager ===
Bengal

- Rajmata Jijabai Trophy: 1996–97

=== Individual ===
- Arjuna Award: 1983

== Bibliography ==
- Shreekumar, S.S. (2020). The Best way forward: for India's Football. HSRA. ISBN 978-81-947216-9-7.
- Kapadia, Novy (2017). Barefoot to Boots: The Many Lives of Indian Football. Penguin Random House. ISBN 978-0-143-42641-7.
- Martinez, Dolores; Mukharjiim, Projit B (2009). Football: From England to the World: The Many Lives of Indian Football. Routledge. ISBN 978-1-138-88353-6. Archived from the original on 2 July 2022.
- Nath, Nirmal (2011). History of Indian Football: Upto 2009–10. Readers Service. ISBN 9788187891963. Archived from the original on 22 July 2022.
- Taylor & Francis: Soccer and Society (2005). The gendered kick: Women's soccer in twentieth century India, Soccer & Society, 6:2–3, 270–284, DOI: 10.1080/14660970500106469.
