= Malaysia national football team results =

Malaysia national football team 1963–present results.

== Results ==
Keynotes

- * Malaysia's score always listed first
- (H) Home country stadium
- (A) Away country stadium
- (N) Neutral venue stadium
- ^{1} Non FIFA 'A' international match
- ^{XI} Malaysia uses a selection of players from the Malaysia Super League, Using the name Malaysia XI

=== 1963–1969 results ===
==== 1963 ====
1963 Results
Date	Opponent	Score*	Venue	Competition	Malaysia scores
12 October	Thailand	1–1 (D)	Malaysia (H)	Football at the 1964 Summer Olympics – Men's qualification	
16 November	Thailand	2–3 (L)	Thailand (A)	Football at the 1964 Summer Olympics – Men's qualification	
7 December	South Vietnam	3–5 (L)	Cộng Hòa Stadium, Saigon (A)	1964 AFC Asian Cup qualification	
11 December	Thailand	3–1 (W)	Cộng Hòa Stadium, Saigon (A)	1964 AFC Asian Cup qualification	
14 December	Hong Kong	3–4 (L)	Cộng Hòa Stadium, Saigon (A)	1964 AFC Asian Cup qualification	

==== 1964 ====
1964 Results
Date	Opponent	Score*	Venue	Competition	Malaysia scores
22 August	Thailand	3–0 (W)	Stadium Merdeka, Kuala Lumpur (H)	1964 Merdeka Tournament	Ambu; Ong Kim Swee; Abdullah Noordin (pen.)
24 August	India	1–1 (D)	Stadium Merdeka, Kuala Lumpur (H)	1964 Merdeka Tournament	Ambu
28 August	Burma	0–3 (L)	Stadium Merdeka, Kuala Lumpur (H)	1964 Merdeka Tournament	
30 August	South Vietnam	1–2 (L)	Stadium Merdeka, Kuala Lumpur (H)	1964 Merdeka Tournament	
2 September	Chinese Taipei	5–2 (W)	Stadium Merdeka, Kuala Lumpur (H)	1964 Merdeka Tournament	
5 September	Thailand	1–1 (D)	Stadium Merdeka, Kuala Lumpur (H)	1964 Merdeka Tournament	

==== 1965 ====
1965 Results
Date	Opponent	Score*	Venue	Competition	Malaysia scores
27 March	Japan	1–1 (D)	Malaysia (H)	Friendly	
14 August	Japan	2–2 (D)	Stadium Merdeka, Kuala Lumpur (H)	1965 Merdeka Tournament Preliminary	
17 August	South Korea	0–2 (L)	Stadium Merdeka, Kuala Lumpur (H)	1965 Merdeka Tournament	
19 August	South Vietnam	3–3 (D)	Stadium Merdeka, Kuala Lumpur (H)	1965 Merdeka Tournament	
21 August	India	0–3 (L)	Stadium Merdeka, Kuala Lumpur (H)	1965 Merdeka Tournament	
23 August	Hong Kong	1–3 (L)	Stadium Merdeka, Kuala Lumpur (H)	1965 Merdeka Tournament	
14 November	Thailand	2–1 (W)	Saigon (A)	1965 South Vietnam Independence Cup	
16 November	South Vietnam	2–2 (D)	Saigon (A)	1965 South Vietnam Independence Cup	
7 December	Australia	0–1 (L)	Malaysia (H)	Friendly	
8 December	Australia	0–3 (L)	Malaysia (H)	Friendly	
18 December	Burma	0–2 (L)	Stadium Merdeka, Kuala Lumpur (H)	Football at the 1965 Southeast Asian Peninsular Games	
20 December	South Vietnam	0–2 (L)	Stadium Merdeka, Kuala Lumpur (H)	Football at the 1965 Southeast Asian Peninsular Games	

==== 1966 ====
1966 Results
Date	Opponent	Score*	Venue	Competition	Malaysia scores
13 August	South Vietnam	5–2 (W)	Stadium Merdeka, Kuala Lumpur (H)	1966 Merdeka Tournament	
17 August	Hong Kong	1–0 (W)	Stadium Merdeka, Kuala Lumpur (H)	1966 Merdeka Tournament	
19 August	Thailand	0–0 (D)	Stadium Merdeka, Kuala Lumpur (H)	1966 Merdeka Tournament	
21 August	Burma	0–0 (D)	Stadium Merdeka, Kuala Lumpur (H)	1966 Merdeka Tournament	
27 August	South Korea	1–2 (L)	Stadium Merdeka, Kuala Lumpur (H)	1966 Merdeka Tournament	
1 November	South Vietnam	2–3 (L)	Saigon (A)	1966 South Vietnam Independence Cup	
3 November	Thailand	1–1 (D)	Saigon (A)	1966 South Vietnam Independence Cup	
10 December	Iran	0–2 (L)	Bangkok (A)	Football at the 1966 Asian Games	
12 December	India	1–2 (L)	Bangkok (A)	Football at the 1966 Asian Games	
14 December	Japan	0–1 (L)	Bangkok (A)	Football at the 1966 Asian Games	

==== 1967 ====
1967 Results
Date	Opponent	Score*	Venue	Competition	Malaysia scores
24 March	Singapore	1–1 (D)	Hong Kong (A)	1968 AFC Asian Cup qualification	
26 March	Hong Kong	1–3 (L)	Hong Kong (A)	1968 AFC Asian Cup qualification	
29 March	South Vietnam	2–0 (W)	Hong Kong (A)	1968 AFC Asian Cup qualification	
31 March	Thailand	0–1 (L)	Hong Kong (A)	1968 AFC Asian Cup qualification	
10 August	Australia	3–2 (W)	Stadium Merdeka, Kuala Lumpur (H)	1967 Merdeka Tournament	
13 August	Hong Kong	3–0 (W)	Stadium Merdeka, Kuala Lumpur (H)	1967 Merdeka Tournament	
15 August	South Vietnam	1–1 (D)	Stadium Merdeka, Kuala Lumpur (H)	1967 Merdeka Tournament	
19 August	India	0–0 (D)	Stadium Merdeka, Kuala Lumpur (H)	1967 Merdeka Tournament	
20 August	Thailand	1–0 (W)	Stadium Perak, Ipoh (H)	1967 Merdeka Tournament	
23 August	South Korea	1–3 (L)	Stadium Merdeka, Kuala Lumpur (H)	1967 Merdeka Tournament	
25 August	South Vietnam	1–2 (L)	Stadium Merdeka, Kuala Lumpur (H)	1967 Merdeka Tournament	
4 November	Thailand	3–2 (W)	Saigon (A)	1967 South Vietnam Independence Cup	
8 November	Hong Kong	2–0 (W)	Saigon (A)	1967 South Vietnam Independence Cup	
11 November	South Korea	1–2 (L)	Saigon (A)	1967 South Vietnam Independence Cup	
12 November	Australia	0–1 (L)	Saigon (A)	1967 South Vietnam Independence Cup	
14 November	South Vietnam	4–1 (W)	Saigon (A)	1967 South Vietnam Independence Cup	
16 November	New Zealand	2–8 (L)	Malaysia (H)	Friendly	
26 November	Australia	0–4 (L)	Malaysia (H)	Friendly	
10 December	Thailand	0–4 (L)	Supachalasai Stadium, Bangkok (A)	Football at the 1967 Southeast Asian Peninsular Games	
11 December	Burma	1–2 (L)	Supachalasai Stadium, Bangkok (A)	Football at the 1967 Southeast Asian Peninsular Games	

==== 1968 ====
1968 Results
Date	Opponent	Score*	Venue	Competition	Malaysia scores
9 August	Hong Kong	1–1 (D)	Stadium Merdeka, Kuala Lumpur (H)	1968 Merdeka Tournament	
11 August	India	2–1 (W)	Stadium Merdeka, Kuala Lumpur (H)	1968 Merdeka Tournament	
14 August	South Vietnam	4–0 (W)	Stadium Perak, Ipoh (H)	1968 Merdeka Tournament	
17 August	Thailand	4–1 (W)	Stadium Merdeka, Kuala Lumpur (H)	1968 Merdeka Tournament	
18 August	Burma	1–1 (D)	Stadium Merdeka, Kuala Lumpur (H)	1968 Merdeka Tournament	
22 August	Australia	4–3 (W)	Stadium Merdeka, Kuala Lumpur (H)	1968 Merdeka Tournament	
25 August	Burma	3–0 (W)	Stadium Merdeka, Kuala Lumpur (H)	1968 Merdeka Tournament	
21 November	Indonesia	0–1 (L)	Bangkok (A)	1968 King's Cup	
24 November	Laos	5–0 (W)	Bangkok (A)	1968 King's Cup	Wong Fook Yoong 27'; Thanabalan 37', 58'; Wong Choon Wah 75'; M. Chandran 84'
26 November	Thailand	0–3 (L)	Bangkok (A)	1968 King's Cup	
28 November	Indonesia	1–6 (L)	Bangkok (A)	1968 King's Cup	Zulkifli 14'
2 December	Thailand	0–6 (L)	Bangkok (A)	1968 King's Cup	

==== 1969 ====
1969 Results
Date	Opponent	Score*	Venue	Competition	Malaysia scores
30 October	Thailand	1–0 (W)	Stadium Merdeka, Kuala Lumpur (H)	1969 Merdeka Tournament	
2 November	South Korea	4–1 (W)	Stadium Merdeka, Kuala Lumpur (H)	1969 Merdeka Tournament	
3 November	Indonesia	1–3 (L)	Stadium Merdeka, Kuala Lumpur (H)	1969 Merdeka Tournament	
7 November	Burma	3–1 (W)	Stadium Merdeka, Kuala Lumpur (H)	1969 Merdeka Tournament	
9 November	Indonesia	2–3 (L)	Stadium Merdeka, Kuala Lumpur (H)	1969 Merdeka Tournament	
19 November	Thailand	2–2 (D)	Bangkok (A)	1969 King's Cup	
21 November	South Korea	0–2 (L)	Bangkok (A)	1969 King's Cup	
23 November	Laos	1–1 (D)	Bangkok (A)	1969 King's Cup	Namat 77'
6 December	Laos	2–1 (W)	Bangkok (A)	1969 King's Cup	
7 December	South Vietnam	2–1 (W)	Bangkok (A)	1969 King's Cup	
10 December	Thailand	0–3 (L)	Bangkok (A)	1969 King's Cup	

=== 1970–1979 results ===
==== 1970 ====
1970 Results
Date	Opponent	Score*	Venue	Competition	Malaysia scores
20 June	Singapore	5–0 (W)	Gelora Senayan Main Stadium, Jakarta (A)	1970 Jakarta Anniversary Tournament	
26 June	Hong Kong	1–1 (D)	Gelora Senayan Main Stadium, Jakarta (A)	1970 Jakarta Anniversary Tournament	
30 July	South Vietnam	0–0 (D)	Stadium Merdeka, Kuala Lumpur (H)	1970 Merdeka Tournament	
1 August	India	1–3 (L)	Stadium Perak, Ipoh (H)	1970 Merdeka Tournament	
4 August	Chinese Taipei	3–1 (W)	Stadium Merdeka, Kuala Lumpur (H)	1970 Merdeka Tournament	
7 August	Australia	4–1 (W)	Stadium Merdeka, Kuala Lumpur (H)	1970 Merdeka Tournament	
9 August	Burma	1–2 (L)	Stadium Merdeka, Kuala Lumpur (H)	1970 Merdeka Tournament	
15 August	Indonesia	4–0 (W)	Stadium Merdeka, Kuala Lumpur (H)	1970 Merdeka Tournament	
29 October	South Vietnam	1–1 (D)	Saigon (A)	1970 South Vietnam Independence Cup	
31 October	Thailand	1–4 (L)	Saigon (A)	1970 South Vietnam Independence Cup	
1 November	Indonesia	3–1 (W)	Saigon (A)	1970 South Vietnam Independence Cup	
9 November	Khmer Republic	1–1 (D)	Bangkok (A)	1970 King's Cup	Shaharuddin 24'
13 November	Indonesia	0–3 (L)	Bangkok (A)	1970 King's Cup	
15 November	South Vietnam	2–1 (W)	Bangkok (A)	1970 King's Cup	Ali 22'; Shukor 63'
18 November	South Korea	0–2 (L)	Bangkok (A)	1970 King's Cup	
20 November	Indonesia	3–0 (W)	Bangkok (A)	1970 King's Cup	Shaharuddin 19' (pen.), 23' (pen.), 75'
10 December	Japan	0–1 (L)	Bangkok (A)	Football at the 1970 Asian Games	
12 December	Burma	0–1 (L)	Bangkok (A)	Football at the 1970 Asian Games	
14 December	Khmer Republic	0–2 (L)	Bangkok (A)	Football at the 1970 Asian Games	

==== 1971 ====
1971 Results
Date	Opponent	Score*	Venue	Competition	Malaysia scores
3 May	Khmer Republic	3–1 (W)	Dongdaemun Stadium, Seoul (A)	1971 President's Cup Football Tournament	
6 May	South Korea	1–5 (L)	Dongdaemun Stadium, Seoul (A)	1971 President's Cup Football Tournament	
8 May	Thailand	4–1 (W)	Dongdaemun Stadium, Seoul (A)	1971 President's Cup Football Tournament	Wong Choon Wah 12', 58'; Chan Kok Leong 50'; Namat 72'
11 May	Burma	1–6 (L)	Dongdaemun Stadium, Seoul (A)	1971 President's Cup Football Tournament	
13 May	Indonesia	2–4 (L)	Dongdaemun Stadium, Seoul (A)	1971 President's Cup Football Tournament	
15 May	Thailand	0–3 (L)	Taiwan (A)	Friendly	
16 May	Chinese Taipei	4–1 (W)	Taiwan (A)	Friendly	
22 May	Brunei	8–0 (W)	Bangkok (A)	1972 AFC Asian Cup qualification	Zulkifli 12', 28', 80'; Shaharuddin 28', 38', 83'; Wong Choon Wah 37'; Soh Chin Aun 48'
26 May	Khmer Republic	2–1 (W)	Bangkok (A)	1972 AFC Asian Cup qualification	Wong Choon Wah 12'; Shaharuddin 75'
28 May	Hong Kong	2–1 (W)	Bangkok (A)	1972 AFC Asian Cup qualification	Shaharuddin 25', 69'
30 May	Thailand	0–1 (L)	Bangkok (A)	1972 AFC Asian Cup qualification	
1 June	Indonesia	3–0 (W)	Bangkok (A)	1972 AFC Asian Cup qualification	
8 June	Khmer Republic	1–1 (D)	Gelora Senayan Main Stadium, Jakarta (A)	1971 Jakarta Anniversary Tournament	
9 June	Australia	3–2 (W)	Gelora Senayan Main Stadium, Jakarta (A)	1971 Jakarta Anniversary Tournament	
11 June	Burma	1–5 (L)	Gelora Senayan Main Stadium, Jakarta (A)	1971 Jakarta Anniversary Tournament	Abdullah 21'
13 June	South Korea	2–1 (W)	Gelora Senayan Main Stadium, Jakarta (A)	1971 Jakarta Anniversary Tournament	Yap Eng Kok 6', 64'
14 June	Indonesia	1–2 (L)	Gelora Senayan Main Stadium, Jakarta (A)	1971 Jakarta Anniversary Tournament	
15 June	Khmer Republic	2–1 (W)	Gelora Senayan Main Stadium, Jakarta (A)	1971 Jakarta Anniversary Tournament	
12 August	South Korea	0–1 (L)	Stadium Merdeka, Kuala Lumpur (H)	1971 Merdeka Tournament	
4 August	South Vietnam	2–0 (W)	Stadium Merdeka, Kuala Lumpur (H)	1971 Merdeka Tournament	
6 August	Chinese Taipei	0–0 (D)	Stadium Merdeka, Kuala Lumpur (H)	1971 Merdeka Tournament	
14 August	Thailand	0–2 (L)	Stadium Merdeka, Kuala Lumpur (H)	1971 Merdeka Tournament	
20 August	Singapore	4–2 (W)	Stadium Merdeka, Kuala Lumpur (H)	1971 Merdeka Tournament	Salleh 12', 52'; Mohsein 50'; Rahim 76'
23 August	Singapore	2–2 (D)	Singapore (A)	Friendly	
26 August	India	0–6 (L)	Singapore (A)	Friendly	
23 September	Japan	3–0 (W)	South Korea (A)	Football at the 1972 Summer Olympics – Men's qualification	
25 September	South Korea	1–0 (W)	South Korea (A)	Football at the 1972 Summer Olympics – Men's qualification	
27 September	Chinese Taipei	3–0 (W)	South Korea (A)	Football at the 1972 Summer Olympics – Men's qualification	
2 October	Philippines	5–0 (W)	South Korea (A)	Football at the 1972 Summer Olympics – Men's qualification	
28 October	South Vietnam	1–0 (W)	Saigon (A)	1971 South Vietnam Independence Cup	
30 October	Singapore	1–1 (D)	Saigon (A)	1971 South Vietnam Independence Cup	
31 October	South Vietnam	1–1 (D)	Saigon (A)	1971 South Vietnam Independence Cup	
8 November	South Korea	2–2 (D)	Bangkok (A)	1971 King's Cup	
10 November	Indonesia	0–2 (L)	Bangkok (A)	1971 King's Cup	
12 December	Laos	5–0 (W)	Stadium Merdeka, Kuala Lumpur (H)	Football at the 1971 Southeast Asian Peninsular Games	
14 December	Thailand	4–2 (W)	Stadium Merdeka, Kuala Lumpur (H)	Football at the 1971 Southeast Asian Peninsular Games	
15 December	Khmer Republic	3–0 (W)	Stadium Merdeka, Kuala Lumpur (H)	Football at the 1971 Southeast Asian Peninsular Games	Salleh 5' ? (?); Wong Choon Wah 56'
17 December	South Vietnam	3–2 (W)	Stadium Merdeka, Kuala Lumpur (H)	Football at the 1971 Southeast Asian Peninsular Games	Shaharuddin 46', 66', 76'
18 December	Burma	1–2 (L)	Stadium Merdeka, Kuala Lumpur (H)	Football at the 1971 Southeast Asian Peninsular Games	Shaharuddin 15'

==== 1972 ====
1972 Results
Date	Opponent	Score*	Venue	Competition	Malaysia scores
7 June	Sri Lanka	3–0 (W)	Gelora Senayan Main Stadium, Jakarta (A)	1972 Jakarta Anniversary Tournament	
9 June	Laos	2–0 (W)	Gelora Senayan Main Stadium, Jakarta (A)	1972 Jakarta Anniversary Tournament	James Wong 12'; P. Avadyaru 55'
13 June	Indonesia	0–3 (L)	Gelora Senayan Main Stadium, Jakarta (A)	1972 Jakarta Anniversary Tournament	
15 June	Burma	2–2 (D)	Gelora Senayan Main Stadium, Jakarta (A)	1972 Jakarta Anniversary Tournament	Mohsein 13'; Mokhtar 49'
12 July	Sri Lanka	4–1 (W)	Stadium Merdeka, Kuala Lumpur (H)	1972 Merdeka Tournament	Hamzah 48'; Shaharuddin 56', 58', 61'
14 July	Philippines	1–0 (W)	Stadium Merdeka, Kuala Lumpur (H)	1972 Merdeka Tournament	Veloso 86' (o.g.)
16 July	Burma	4–0 (W)	Stadium Merdeka, Kuala Lumpur (H)	1972 Merdeka Tournament	Wan 10'; Rahim 27'; Wong Choon Wah 81'; Namat 87'
19 July	Khmer Republic	6–1 (W)	Stadium Merdeka, Kuala Lumpur (H)	1972 Merdeka Tournament	
22 July	Japan	3–1 (W)	Stadium Merdeka, Kuala Lumpur (H)	1972 Merdeka Tournament	Wan 23'; Shaharuddin 68', 86'
29 July	South Korea	1–2 (L)	Stadium Merdeka, Kuala Lumpur (H)	1972 Merdeka Tournament	Soh Chin Aun 68'
27 August	West Germany	0–3 (L)	Olympic Stadium, Munich (A)	Football at the 1972 Summer Olympics	
29 August	United States	3–0 (W)	Tuja Stadium, Ingolstadt (A)	Football at the 1972 Summer Olympics	Shaharuddin 14'; Salleh 67'; Zawawi 77'
31 August	Morocco	0–6 (L)	Tuja Stadium, Ingolstadt (A)	Football at the 1972 Summer Olympics	
20 September	Khmer Republic	1–0 (W)	Dongdaemun Stadium, Seoul (A)	1972 President's Cup Football Tournament	Soh Chin Aun 45'
22 September	Thailand	1–1 (D)	Dongdaemun Stadium, Seoul (A)	1972 President's Cup Football Tournament	Soh Chin Aun 62'
24 September	South Korea	0–2 (L)	Dongdaemun Stadium, Seoul (A)	1972 President's Cup Football Tournament	
28 September	Indonesia	1–3 (L)	Dongdaemun Stadium, Seoul (A)	1972 President's Cup Football Tournament	Shaharuddin 6'
30 September	South Korea	0–1 (L)	Dongdaemun Stadium, Seoul (A)	1972 President's Cup Football Tournament	
28 October	South Vietnam	0–0 (D)	Saigon (A)	1972 South Vietnam Independence Cup	
29 October	Khmer Republic	0–1 (L)	Saigon (A)	1972 South Vietnam Independence Cup	
1 November	Singapore	1–3 (L)	Saigon (A)	1972 South Vietnam Independence Cup	
18 November	South Korea	1–4 (L)	Bangkok (A)	1972 King's Cup	
20 November	Thailand	2–0 (W)	Bangkok (A)	1972 King's Cup	
22 November	Singapore	2–0 (W)	Bangkok (A)	1972 King's Cup	
26 November	Indonesia	2–0 (W)	Bangkok (A)	1972 King's Cup	
28 November	Thailand	1–0 (W)	Bangkok (A)	1972 King's Cup	

==== 1973 ====
1973 Results
Date	Opponent	Score*	Venue	Competition	Malaysia scores
17 May	Hong Kong	0–1 (L)	Seoul (A)	1974 FIFA World Cup qualification (AFC)	
19 May	Israel	0–3 (L)	Seoul (A)	1974 FIFA World Cup qualification (AFC)	
21 May	South Korea	0–0 (D)	Seoul (A)	1974 FIFA World Cup qualification (AFC)	
23 May	Thailand	2–0 (W)	Seoul (A)	1974 FIFA World Cup qualification (AFC)	Rahim (?); Harun (?)
12 June	Burma	2–2 (D)	Gelora Senayan Main Stadium, Jakarta (A)	1973 Jakarta Anniversary Tournament	
14 June	Indonesia	0–2 (L)	Gelora Senayan Main Stadium, Jakarta (A)	1973 Jakarta Anniversary Tournament	
26 July	Kuwait	0–0 (D) (AET) (3 PSO 2)	Stadium Merdeka, Kuala Lumpur (H)	1973 Merdeka Tournament	
July	South Korea	1–2 (L)	Stadium Merdeka, Kuala Lumpur (H)	1973 Merdeka Tournament	
28 July	Khmer Republic	1–0 (W)	Stadium Merdeka, Kuala Lumpur (H)	1973 Merdeka Tournament	
1 August	Thailand	2–2 (D)	Stadium Merdeka, Kuala Lumpur (H)	1973 Merdeka Tournament	
4 August	India	4–0 (W)	Stadium Merdeka, Kuala Lumpur (H)	1973 Merdeka Tournament	
10 August	Burma	2–1 (W)	Stadium Merdeka, Kuala Lumpur (H)	1973 Merdeka Tournament	
12 August	Kuwait	3–1 (W)	Stadium Merdeka, Kuala Lumpur (H)	1973 Merdeka Tournament	
12 August	Thailand	1–1 (D)	Former National Stadium, Kallang (A)	Football at the 1973 Southeast Asian Peninsular Games	Rochana 2' (o.g.)
4 September	Singapore	0–0 (D)	Former National Stadium, Kallang (A)	Football at the 1973 Southeast Asian Peninsular Games	
6 September	Burma	0–1 (L)	Former National Stadium, Kallang (A)	Football at the 1973 Southeast Asian Peninsular Games	
7 September	Singapore	3–0 (W)	Former National Stadium, Kallang (A)	Football at the 1973 Southeast Asian Peninsular Games	Reduan 6'; Mokhtar 34'; R. Visvanathan 84'
24 September	Thailand	5–1 (W)	Dongdaemun Stadium, Seoul (A)	1973 President's Cup Football Tournament	Wong Choon Wah 1', 66'; Afandi 3'; Mokhtar 81'; Abdullah 89'
26 September	Burma	3–1 (W)	Dongdaemun Stadium, Seoul (A)	1973 President's Cup Football Tournament	R. Visvanathan 8', 52', 68'
28 September	Khmer Republic	0–2 (L)	Dongdaemun Stadium, Seoul (A)	1973 President's Cup Football Tournament	
30 September	South Korea	0–2 (L)	Dongdaemun Stadium, Seoul (A)	1973 President's Cup Football Tournament	
1 November	South Vietnam	5–1 (W)	Saigon (A)	1973 South Vietnam Independence Cup	
3 November	Singapore	2–1 (W)	Saigon (A)	1973 South Vietnam Independence Cup	
18 December	South Korea	0–0 (D)	Bangkok (A)	1973 King's Cup	
20 December	Khmer Republic	3–2 (W)	Bangkok (A)	1973 King's Cup	
22 December	Thailand	1–0 (W)	Bangkok (A)	1973 King's Cup	
25 December	South Korea	1–2 (L)	Bangkok (A)	1973 King's Cup	

==== 1974 ====
1974 Results
Date	Opponent	Score*	Venue	Competition	Malaysia scores
16 February	Japan	0–1 (L)	Thailand (N)	Friendly	
8 May	(England) Everton	0–1 (L)	Perak Stadium, Ipoh, Perak (H)	Friendly^{1XI}	
11 May	Khmer Republic	1–1 (D)	Dongdaemun Stadium, Seoul (A)	1974 President's Cup Football Tournament	
13 May	Japan	1–1 (D)	Dongdaemun Stadium, Seoul (A)	1974 President's Cup Football Tournament	
15 May	South Korea	0–4 (L)	Dongdaemun Stadium, Seoul (A)	1974 President's Cup Football Tournament	
18 May	(Indonesia) PSMS Medan	0–0 (D) (AET) (2 PSO 3)	Dongdaemun Stadium, Seoul (A)	1974 President's Cup Football Tournament	
3 June	Burma	0–3 (L)	Gelora Senayan Main Stadium, Jakarta (A)	1974 Jakarta Anniversary Tournament	
7 June	Indonesia	3–4 (L)	Gelora Senayan Main Stadium, Jakarta (A)	1974 Jakarta Anniversary Tournament	
23 July	South Korea	1–0 (W)	Stadium Merdeka, Kuala Lumpur (H)	1974 Merdeka Tournament	Ahmad 27'
25 July	India	4–1 (W)	Stadium Merdeka, Kuala Lumpur (H)	1974 Merdeka Tournament	Ahmad 5'; Bakar 16', 34'; Wong Choon Wah 65'
27 July	Hong Kong	1–0 (W)	Stadium Merdeka, Kuala Lumpur (H)	1974 Merdeka Tournament	Mokhtar 86'
1 August	Thailand	3–2 (W)	Stadium Merdeka, Kuala Lumpur (H)	1974 Merdeka Tournament	Bakar 9'; Mokhtar 45' (pen.); Ahmad 88'
4 August	South Korea	1–0 (W)	Stadium Merdeka, Kuala Lumpur (H)	1974 Merdeka Tournament	Mokhtar 84'
3 September	Israel	3–8 (L)	Aryamehr Stadium, Tehran (A)	Football at the 1974 Asian Games	Zawawi 61' (pen.); Ahmad 75', 80'
5 September	Japan	1–1 (D)	Persepolis Stadium, Tehran (A)	Football at the 1974 Asian Games	Bakar 66'
7 September	Philippines	11–0 (W)	Persepolis Stadium, Tehran (A)	Football at the 1974 Asian Games	
9 September	Iran	0–1 (L)	Aryamehr Stadium, Tehran (A)	Football at the 1974 Asian Games	
11 September	Iraq	0–0 (D)	Aryamehr Stadium, Tehran (A)	Football at the 1974 Asian Games	
13 September	South Korea	3–2 (W)	Aryamehr Stadium, Tehran (A)	Football at the 1974 Asian Games	Harun 10', 22'; Ali 78'
15 September	North Korea	2–1 (W)	Aryamehr Stadium, Tehran (A)	Football at the 1974 Asian Games	Isa 48', 81'
2 November	Laos	0–0 (D)	Saigon (A)	1974 South Vietnam Independence Cup	
3 November	Chinese Taipei	0–0 (D)	Saigon (A)	1974 South Vietnam Independence Cup	
5 November	South Vietnam	0–1 (L)	Saigon (A)	1974 South Vietnam Independence Cup	
10 December	Thailand	2–0 (W)	Bangkok (A)	1974 King's Cup	
12 December	Singapore	0–0 (D)	Bangkok (A)	1974 King's Cup	
14 December	Laos	2–2 (D)	Bangkok (A)	1974 King's Cup	
16 December	Thailand	1–4 (L)	Bangkok (A)	1974 King's Cup	
18 December	South Korea	0–0 (D)	Bangkok (A)	1974 King's Cup	
20 December	Khmer Republic	3–0 (W)	Bangkok (A)	1974 King's Cup	

==== 1975 ====
1975 Results
Date	Opponent	Score*	Venue	Competition	Malaysia scores
16 March	South Korea	2–1 (W)	Bangkok (A)	1976 AFC Asian Cup qualification	Isa 19'; Mokhtar 50'
18 March	Thailand	1–0 (W)	Bangkok (A)	1976 AFC Asian Cup qualification	
20 March	Indonesia	0–0 (D)	Bangkok (A)	1976 AFC Asian Cup qualification	
23 March	South Vietnam	3–0 (W)	Bangkok (A)	1976 AFC Asian Cup qualification	
26 March	Thailand	1–2 (L)	Thailand (A)	Friendly	
13 May	(England) Arsenal	2–0 (W)	Stadium Merdeka, Kuala Lumpur (H)	Friendly^{1XI}	Mokhtar (?)
15 May	(England) Arsenal	1–1 (D)	City Stadium, George Town, Penang (H)	Friendly^{1XI}	Isa (?)
13 June	Thailand	1–0 (W)	Gelora Senayan Main Stadium, Jakarta (A)	1975 Jakarta Anniversary Tournament	
14 June	Indonesia	1–3 (L)	Gelora Senayan Main Stadium, Jakarta (A)	1975 Jakarta Anniversary Tournament	
16 June	South Korea	1–1 (D)	Gelora Senayan Main Stadium, Jakarta (A)	1975 Jakarta Anniversary Tournament	
18 June	Burma	0–2 (L)	Gelora Senayan Main Stadium, Jakarta (A)	1975 Jakarta Anniversary Tournament	
29 July	South Korea	1–3 (L)	Stadium Merdeka, Kuala Lumpur (H)	1975 Merdeka Tournament	
July	Bangladesh	3–0 (W)	Stadium Merdeka, Kuala Lumpur (H)	1975 Merdeka Tournament	
31 July	Hong Kong	3–1 (W)	Stadium Merdeka, Kuala Lumpur (H)	1975 Merdeka Tournament	
2 August	Japan	2–0 (W)	Stadium Merdeka, Kuala Lumpur (H)	1975 Merdeka Tournament	
4 August	Thailand	1–0 (W)	Stadium Merdeka, Kuala Lumpur (H)	1975 Merdeka Tournament	
10 August	Burma	2–1 (W)	Stadium Merdeka, Kuala Lumpur (H)	1975 Merdeka Tournament	
14 August	Indonesia	2–1 (W)	Stadium Merdeka, Kuala Lumpur (H)	1975 Merdeka Tournament	
17 August	South Korea	0–1 (L)	Stadium Merdeka, Kuala Lumpur (H)	1975 Merdeka Tournament	
9 December	Thailand	1–1 (D)	Bangkok (A)	Football at the 1975 Southeast Asian Peninsular Games	
13 December	Burma	1–0 (W)	Bangkok (A)	Football at the 1975 Southeast Asian Peninsular Games	
16 December	Thailand	1–2 (L)	Bangkok (A)	Football at the 1975 Southeast Asian Peninsular Games	
21 December	Singapore	0–0 (D)	Bangkok (A)	1975 King's Cup	
27 December	Burma	1–2 (L)	Bangkok (A)	1975 King's Cup	
29 December	Thailand	0–1 (L)	Bangkok (A)	1975 King's Cup	

==== 1976 ====
1976 Results
Date	Opponent	Score*	Venue	Competition	Malaysia scores
2 January	South Korea	0–4 (L)	Bangkok (A)	1976 King's Cup	
15 February	Papua New Guinea	10–1 (W)	Indonesia (A)	Football at the 1976 Summer Olympics – Men's qualification	
18 February	North Korea	0–2 (L)	Indonesia (A)	Football at the 1976 Summer Olympics – Men's qualification	
22 February	Singapore	6–0 (W)	Indonesia (A)	Football at the 1976 Summer Olympics – Men's qualification	
24 February	Indonesia	1–2 (L)	Indonesia (A)	Football at the 1976 Summer Olympics – Men's qualification	
6 May	China	0–2 (L)	China (A)	Friendly	
9 May	North Korea	0–5 (L)	North Korea (A)	Friendly	
3 June	Kuwait	0–2 (L)	Bagh Shomal Stadium, Tabriz (A)	1976 AFC Asian Cup	
5 June	China	1–1 (D)	Bagh Shomal Stadium, Tabriz (A)	1976 AFC Asian Cup	Mokhtar 50'
8 June	Burma	1–3 (L)	Gelora Senayan Main Stadium, Jakarta (A)	1976 Jakarta Anniversary Tournament	
10 June	Indonesia	2–1 (W)	Gelora Senayan Main Stadium, Jakarta (A)	1976 Jakarta Anniversary Tournament	
12 June	South Korea	1–2 (L)	Gelora Senayan Main Stadium, Jakarta (A)	1976 Jakarta Anniversary Tournament	
7 August	South Korea	2–1 (W)	Stadium Merdeka, Kuala Lumpur (H)	1976 Merdeka Tournament	
9 August	Thailand	0–0 (D)	Stadium Merdeka, Kuala Lumpur (H)	1976 Merdeka Tournament	
12 August	India	5–1 (W)	Stadium Merdeka, Kuala Lumpur (H)	1976 Merdeka Tournament	
14 August	Indonesia	7–1 (W)	Stadium Merdeka, Kuala Lumpur (H)	1976 Merdeka Tournament	
17 August	Burma	3–1 (W)	Stadium Merdeka, Kuala Lumpur (H)	1976 Merdeka Tournament	
20 August	Japan	2–2 (D)	Stadium Merdeka, Kuala Lumpur (H)	1976 Merdeka Tournament	
22 August	Japan	2–0 (W)	Stadium Merdeka, Kuala Lumpur (H)	1976 Merdeka Tournament	
11 September	South Korea	4–4 (D)	Dongdaemun Stadium, Seoul (A)	1976 President's Cup Football Tournament	Wan 12' ? 21' ? 32' ? (?)
13 September	Singapore	4–1 (W)	Dongdaemun Stadium, Seoul (A)	1976 President's Cup Football Tournament	Isa 14'; Shukor 17'; Mokhtar (?)
15 September	(Brazil) São Paulo	0–2 (L)	Dongdaemun Stadium, Seoul (A)	1976 President's Cup Football Tournament	
19 September	India	4–0 (W)	Dongdaemun Stadium, Seoul (A)	1976 President's Cup Football Tournament	
16 December	Thailand	1–1 (D)	Bangkok (A)	1976 King's Cup	
18 December	Bangladesh	6–0 (W)	Bangkok (A)	1976 King's Cup	
22 December	South Korea	1–1 (D) (AET) (3 PSO 2)	Bangkok (A)	1976 King's Cup	
25 December	Thailand	1–1 (D)	Bangkok (A)	1976 King's Cup	

==== 1977 ====
1977 Results
Date	Opponent	Score*	Venue	Competition	Malaysia scores
1 March	Thailand	6–4 (W)	Singapore (A)	1978 FIFA World Cup qualification (AFC)	James Wong 15', 38', 51', 60'; Isa 17', 19'
3 March	Indonesia	0–0 (D)	Singapore (A)	1978 FIFA World Cup qualification (AFC)	
6 March	Singapore	0–1 (L)	Singapore (A)	1978 FIFA World Cup qualification (AFC)	
8 March	Hong Kong	1–1 (D)	Singapore (A)	1978 FIFA World Cup qualification (AFC)	Bakri 78'
16 July	Burma	1–0 (W)	Stadium Merdeka, Kuala Lumpur (H)	1977 Merdeka Tournament	Myint Kyu 87' (o.g.)
18 July	Thailand	3–0 (W)	Stadium Merdeka, Kuala Lumpur (H)	1977 Merdeka Tournament	Marzuki 12'; Mokhtar 27'; Abdah 55'
21 July	Libya	1–1 (D)	Stadium Merdeka, Kuala Lumpur (H)	1977 Merdeka Tournament	Marzuki 75'
23 July	Iraq	0–0 (D)	Stadium Merdeka, Kuala Lumpur (H)	1977 Merdeka Tournament	
26 July	South Korea	1–1 (D)	Stadium Merdeka, Kuala Lumpur (H)	1977 Merdeka Tournament	Mokhtar 72' (pen.)
29 July	(Indonesia) Persebaya XI	5–1 (W)	Stadium Merdeka, Kuala Lumpur (H)	1977 Merdeka Tournament	Mokhtar 42'; Isa 44'; S. Singh 49' (pen.); Soh Chin Aun 60'; Reduan 88'
4 September	South Korea	1–1 (D)	Dongdaemun Stadium, Seoul (A)	1977 President's Cup Football Tournament	Suabaka 19'
6 September	(Brazil) São Paulo	1–3 (L)	Busan Gudeok Stadium, Busan (A)	1977 President's Cup Football Tournament	
8 September	Bahrain	3–1 (W)	Daegu Civic Stadium, Daegu (A)	1977 President's Cup Football Tournament	
13 September	South Korea	0–3 (L)	Dongdaemun Stadium, Seoul (A)	1977 President's Cup Football Tournament	
15 September	Thailand	1–1 (D)	Dongdaemun Stadium, Seoul (A)	1977 President's Cup Football Tournament	Bakri 47'
29 October	Indonesia	3–0 (W)	Bangkok (A)	1977 King's Cup	
1 November	Singapore	4–3 (W)	Bangkok (A)	1977 King's Cup	
4 November	South Korea	0–1 (L)	Bangkok (A)	1977 King's Cup	
6 November	Thailand	2–1 (W)	Bangkok (A)	1977 King's Cup	
10 November	India	3–0 (W)	Bangkok (A)	1977 King's Cup	
12 November	South Korea	0–0 (D)	Bangkok (A)	1977 King's Cup	
19 November	Indonesia	1–2 (L)	Stadium Merdeka, Kuala Lumpur (H)	Football at the 1977 Southeast Asian Games	Abdah 88'
21 November	Philippines	5–0 (W)	Stadium Merdeka, Kuala Lumpur (H)	Football at the 1977 Southeast Asian Games	
23 November	Brunei	7–0 (W)	Stadium Merdeka, Kuala Lumpur (H)	Football at the 1977 Southeast Asian Games	
25 November	Burma	9–1 (W)	Stadium Merdeka, Kuala Lumpur (H)	Football at the 1977 Southeast Asian Games	James Wong 2'; Mokhtar 8', 29' (pen.), 39', 86', 88'; Isa 56', 62'; Bakri 83'
26 November	Thailand	2–0 (W)	Stadium Merdeka, Kuala Lumpur (H)	Football at the 1977 Southeast Asian Games	Bakri 11'; Mokhtar 68'

==== 1978 ====
1978 Results
Date	Opponent	Score*	Venue	Competition	Malaysia scores
April	Singapore	0–1 (L)	Bangkok (A)	1978 King's Cup	
May	Thailand	3–2 (W)	Bangkok (A)	1978 King's Cup	
May	South Korea	3–0 (W)	Bangkok (A)	1978 King's Cup	
May	Singapore	3–2 (W)	Bangkok (A)	1978 King's Cup	
13 June	Indonesia	0–3 (L)	Gelora Senayan Main Stadium, Jakarta (A)	1978 Jakarta Anniversary Tournament	
16 June	Singapore	1–1 (D)	Gelora Senayan Main Stadium, Jakarta (A)	1978 Jakarta Anniversary Tournament	
19 June	South Korea	1–3 (L)	Gelora Senayan Main Stadium, Jakarta (A)	1978 Jakarta Anniversary Tournament	
21 June	Thailand	1–1 (D)	Gelora Senayan Main Stadium, Jakarta (A)	1978 Jakarta Anniversary Tournament	
12 July	South Korea	1–3 (L)	Stadium Merdeka, Kuala Lumpur (H)	1978 Merdeka Tournament	
14 July	Singapore	6–0 (W)	Stadium Merdeka, Kuala Lumpur (H)	1978 Merdeka Tournament	
16 July	Thailand	2–0 (W)	Stadium Merdeka, Kuala Lumpur (H)	1978 Merdeka Tournament	
19 July	Indonesia	1–0 (W)	Stadium Merdeka, Kuala Lumpur (H)	1978 Merdeka Tournament	
21 July	Japan	4–1 (W)	Stadium Merdeka, Kuala Lumpur (H)	1978 Merdeka Tournament	
23 July	Syria	5–2 (W)	Stadium Merdeka, Kuala Lumpur (H)	1978 Merdeka Tournament	
26 July	Iraq	1–3 (L)	Stadium Merdeka, Kuala Lumpur (H)	1978 Merdeka Tournament	
9 September	Bahrain	2–1 (W)	Dongdaemun Stadium, Seoul (A)	1978 President's Cup Football Tournament	
11 September	South Korea	2–2 (D)	Busan Gudeok Stadium, Busan (A)	1978 President's Cup Football Tournament	Fakril 9'; Hamidon 47'
13 September	(United States) Washington Diplomats	0–2 (L)	Daegu Civic Stadium, Daegu (A)	1978 President's Cup Football Tournament	
10 December	India	1–0 (W)	Bangkok (A)	Football at the 1978 Asian Games	Isa (?)
12 December	Bangladesh	1–0 (W)	Bangkok (A)	Football at the 1978 Asian Games	Isa (?)
December	Thailand	1–2 (L)	Bangkok (A)	Football at the 1978 Asian Games	
December	China	1–7 (L)	Bangkok (A)	Football at the 1978 Asian Games	
December	South Korea	0–1 (L)	Bangkok (A)	Football at the 1978 Asian Games	

==== 1979 ====
1979 Results
Date	Opponent	Score*	Venue	Competition	Malaysia scores
2 May	Sri Lanka	3–1 (W)	Bangkok (A)	1980 AFC Asian Cup qualification	
5 May	Indonesia	4–1 (W)	Bangkok (A)	1980 AFC Asian Cup qualification	S. Singh 35'; James Wong 51'; Bakri 55'; Mokhtar 88'
9 May	North Korea	1–1 (D)	Bangkok (A)	1980 AFC Asian Cup qualification	
11 May	Hong Kong	0–0 (D) (AET) (5 PSO 4)	Bangkok (A)	1980 AFC Asian Cup qualification	
14 May	North Korea	0–1 (L)	Bangkok (A)	1980 AFC Asian Cup qualification	
27 June	Japan	1–1 (D)	Stadium Merdeka, Kuala Lumpur (H)	1979 Merdeka Tournament	
29 June	Burma	4–1 (W)	Stadium Merdeka, Kuala Lumpur (H)	1979 Merdeka Tournament	
1 July	Thailand	4–2 (W)	Stadium Merdeka, Kuala Lumpur (H)	1979 Merdeka Tournament	
4 July	Indonesia	1–1 (D)	Stadium Merdeka, Kuala Lumpur (H)	1979 Merdeka Tournament	
9 July	Singapore	3–0 (W)	Stadium Merdeka, Kuala Lumpur (H)	1979 Merdeka Tournament	
12 July	Malaysia	3–1 (W)	Stadium Merdeka, Kuala Lumpur (H)	1979 Merdeka Tournament	
15 July	South Korea	0–0 (D)	Stadium Merdeka, Kuala Lumpur (H)	1979 Merdeka Tournament	
23 September	Singapore	2–0 (W)	Gelora Senayan Main Stadium, Jakarta (A)	Football at the 1979 Southeast Asian Games	James Wong 76'; Hassan 84'
25 September	Burma	0–0 (D)	Gelora Senayan Main Stadium, Jakarta (A)	Football at the 1979 Southeast Asian Games	
28 September	Thailand	1–0 (W)	Gelora Senayan Main Stadium, Jakarta (A)	Football at the 1979 Southeast Asian Games	
30 September	Indonesia	1–0 (W)	Gelora Senayan Main Stadium, Jakarta (A)	Football at the 1979 Southeast Asian Games	Mokhtar 21'
14 November	Sweden	1–3 (L)	Malaysia (H)	Friendly	
25 November	Singapore	0–4 (L)	Thailand (A)	1979 King's Cup	

=== 1980–1989 results ===
==== 1980 ====
1980 Results
Date	Opponent	Score*	Venue	Competition	Malaysia scores
16 March	China	3–1 (W)	Malaysia (H)	Friendly	
21 March	Indonesia	6–1 (W)	Stadium Merdeka, Kuala Lumpur (H)	1980 Asian Olympic Qualifying Tournaments	
25 March	South Korea	3–0 (W)	Stadium Merdeka, Kuala Lumpur (H)	1980 Asian Olympic Qualifying Tournaments	
27 March	Brunei	3–1 (W)	Stadium Merdeka, Kuala Lumpur (H)	1980 Asian Olympic Qualifying Tournaments	
30 March	Japan	1–1 (D)	Stadium Merdeka, Kuala Lumpur (H)	1980 Asian Olympic Qualifying Tournaments	
2 April	Philippines	8–0 (W)	Stadium Merdeka, Kuala Lumpur (H)	1980 Asian Olympic Qualifying Tournaments	
6 April	South Korea	2–1 (W)	Stadium Merdeka, Kuala Lumpur (H)	1980 Asian Olympic Qualifying Tournaments	Bakri 12'; James Wong 85'
23 August	South Korea	0–2 (L)	Dongdaemun Stadium, Seoul (A)	1980 President's Cup Football Tournament	
25 August	Bahrain	1–1 (D)	Chuncheon Civic Stadium, Chuncheon (A)	1980 President's Cup Football Tournament	
27 August	South Korea	0–1 (L)	Daejeon Hanbat Stadium, Daejeon (A)	1980 President's Cup Football Tournament	
29 August	Thailand	1–4 (L)	Daejeon Hanbat Stadium, Daejeon (A)	1980 President's Cup Football Tournament	
31 August	Indonesia	1–1 (D)	Gwangju Mudeung Stadium, Gwangju (A)	1980 President's Cup Football Tournament	
16 September	South Korea	1–1 (D)	Sabah Al-Salem Stadium, Kuwait City (A)	1980 AFC Asian Cup	Zulkifli 90'
18 September	Kuwait	1–3 (L)	Sabah Al-Salem Stadium, Kuwait City (A)	1980 AFC Asian Cup	Zulkifli 44'
20 September	United Arab Emirates	2–0 (W)	Sabah Al-Salem Stadium, Kuwait City (A)	1980 AFC Asian Cup	Abdah 32'; Tukamin 89'
23 September	Qatar	1–1 (D)	Sabah Al-Salem Stadium, Kuwait City (A)	1980 AFC Asian Cup	Tukamin (?)
29 September	Saudi Arabia	0–3 (L)	Turkey (A)	Turkey Islamic Games	
30 September	Libya	0–1 (L)	Turkey (A)	Turkey Islamic Games	
2 October	Northern Cyprus	1–2 (L)	Turkey (A)	Turkey Islamic Games	
5 October	Turkey	0–3 (L)	Turkey (A)	Turkey Islamic Games	
17 October	Burma	3–2 (W)	Stadium Merdeka, Kuala Lumpur (H)	1980 Merdeka Tournament	
20 October	Thailand	2–2 (D)	Stadium Merdeka, Kuala Lumpur (H)	1980 Merdeka Tournament	
22 October	South Korea	1–1 (D)	Stadium Merdeka, Kuala Lumpur (H)	1980 Merdeka Tournament	
24 October	Morocco	2–0 (W)	Stadium Merdeka, Kuala Lumpur (H)	1980 Merdeka Tournament	
27 October	Indonesia	1–1 (D)	Stadium Merdeka, Kuala Lumpur (H)	1980 Merdeka Tournament	
29 October	Kuwait	2–1 (W)	Stadium Merdeka, Kuala Lumpur (H)	1980 Merdeka Tournament	
30 October	New Zealand	2–0 (W)	Stadium Merdeka, Kuala Lumpur (H)	1980 Merdeka Tournament	
2 November	Morocco	1–2 (L)	Stadium Merdeka, Kuala Lumpur (H)	1980 Merdeka Tournament	

==== 1981 ====
1981 Results
Date	Opponent	Score*	Venue	Competition	Malaysia scores
8 February	Japan	1–0 (W)	Malaysia (H)	Friendly	
10 February	Japan	1–1 (D)	Malaysia (H)	Friendly	
5 April	Singapore	1–1 (D)	Singapore (A)	Friendly	
17 April	Singapore	1–2 (L)	Malaysia (H)	Friendly	
21 April	South Korea	1–2 (L)	Kuwait City (A)	1982 FIFA World Cup qualification (AFC)	Wong Chye 6'
25 April	Kuwait	0–4 (L)	Kuwait City (A)	1982 FIFA World Cup qualification (AFC)	
27 April	Thailand	2–2 (D)	Kuwait City (A)	1982 FIFA World Cup qualification (AFC)	Ibrahim (?)
13 June	(Argentina) Racing Córdoba	0–6 (L)	Dongdaemun Stadium, Seoul (A)	1981 President's Cup Football Tournament	
15 June	(France) LB Châteauroux	2–0 (W)	Daejeon Hanbat Stadium, Daejeon (A)	1981 President's Cup Football Tournament	Ibrahim 40'; Hamzah 75'
17 June	South Korea	0–2 (L)	Jeonju Stadium, Jeonju (A)	1981 President's Cup Football Tournament	
19 June	Japan	0–2 (L)	Daegu Civic Stadium, Daegu (A)	1981 President's Cup Football Tournament	
21 June	(West Germany) 1. FC Saarbrücken	1–2 (L)	Busan Gudeok Stadium, Busan (A)	1981 President's Cup Football Tournament	
30 August	Japan	0–2 (L)	Stadium Merdeka, Kuala Lumpur (H)	1981 Merdeka Tournament	
4 September	New Zealand	0–1 (L)	Stadium Merdeka, Kuala Lumpur (H)	1981 Merdeka Tournament	
9 September	Indonesia	2–0 (W)	Stadium Merdeka, Kuala Lumpur (H)	1981 Merdeka Tournament	
12 September	United Arab Emirates	0–1 (L)	Stadium Merdeka, Kuala Lumpur (H)	1981 Merdeka Tournament	
15 September	India	2–2 (D)	Stadium Merdeka, Kuala Lumpur (H)	1981 Merdeka Tournament	
6 October	Liechtenstein	0–1 (L)	Liechtenstein (A)	Friendly	
11 November	Singapore	0–1 (L)	Thailand (A)	1981 King's Cup	
13 November	Pakistan	2–3 (L)	Thailand (A)	1981 King's Cup	
15 November	Thailand	0–2 (L)	Thailand (A)	1981 King's Cup	
6 December	Burma	1–0 (W)	Philippines (A)	Football at the 1981 Southeast Asian Games	Muin (?)
8 December	Thailand	2–2 (D)	Philippines (A)	Football at the 1981 Southeast Asian Games	Jamal 24'; S. Suvindran 33'
13 December	Singapore	1–1 (D) (AET) (5 PSO 4)	Philippines (A)	Football at the 1981 Southeast Asian Games	Muin 85'
15 December	Thailand	1–2 (L)	Rizal Memorial Stadium, Manila (A)	Football at the 1981 Southeast Asian Games	Muin 86'

==== 1982 ====
1982 Results
Date	Opponent	Score*	Venue	Competition	Malaysia scores
27 January	Bahrain	0–2 (L)	Malaysia (H)	Friendly	
6 June	(West Germany) Bayer Leverkusen	2–1 (W)	Dongdaemun Stadium, Seoul (A)	1982 President's Cup Football Tournament	
8 June	(South Korea) Hallelujah	0–1 (L)	Daegu Civic Stadium, Daegu (A)	1982 President's Cup Football Tournament	
10 June	Thailand	1–1 (D)	Busan Gudeok Stadium, Busan (A)	1982 President's Cup Football Tournament	
14 June	(Brazil) Operário	1–3 (L)	Incheon Civic Stadium, Incheon (A)	1982 President's Cup Football Tournament	
31 July	(England) Nottingham Forest	0–3 (L)	Stadium Merdeka, Kuala Lumpur (H)	Friendly^{1XI}	
5 August	Indonesia	0–2 (L)	Stadium Merdeka, Kuala Lumpur (H)	1982 Merdeka Tournament	
7 August	United Arab Emirates	1–0 (W)	Stadium Merdeka, Kuala Lumpur (H)	1982 Merdeka Tournament	
10 August	South Korea	1–2 (L)	Stadium Merdeka, Kuala Lumpur (H)	1982 Merdeka Tournament	
13 August	Senegal	1–0 (W)	Stadium Merdeka, Kuala Lumpur (H)	1982 Merdeka Tournament	
5 October	Singapore	1–0 (W)	Former National Stadium, Kallang (A)	1982 Merlion Cup	
7 October	South Korea	1–3 (L)	Former National Stadium, Kallang (A)	1982 Merlion Cup	
10 October	Brunei	4–0 (W)	Former National Stadium, Kallang (A)	1982 Merlion Cup	
14 October	Australia	0–5 (L)	Former National Stadium, Kallang (A)	1982 Merlion Cup	
17 October	Indonesia	0–0 (D) (AET) (3 PSO 4)	Former National Stadium, Kallang (A)	1982 Merlion Cup	
20 November	China	0–1 (L)	Chhatrasal Stadium, North Delhi, Delhi (A)	Football at the 1982 Asian Games	
22 November	India	0–1 (L)	Ambedkar Stadium, New Delhi, Delhi (A)	Football at the 1982 Asian Games	
24 November	Bangladesh	1–2 (L)	New Delhi (A)	Football at the 1982 Asian Games	

==== 1983 ====
1983 Results
Date	Opponent	Score*	Venue	Competition	Malaysia scores
18 May	(England) Newcastle United	2–5 (L)	Stadium Merdeka, Kuala Lumpur (H)	Friendly^{1XI}	Zainal (?); Chen Wooi Haw (?)
20 May	(England) Newcastle United	0–1 (L)	Darulmakmur Stadium, Kuantan, Pahang (H)	Friendly^{1XI}	
28 May	Singapore	1–2 (L)	Former National Stadium, Kallang (A)	Football at the 1983 Southeast Asian Games	Chen Wooi Haw 20'
30 May	Philippines	0–0 (D)	Former National Stadium, Kallang (A)	Football at the 1983 Southeast Asian Games	
4 June	Thailand	1–1 (D) (AET) (0 PSO 3)	Former National Stadium, Kallang (A)	Football at the 1983 Southeast Asian Games	S. Singh 26'
5 June	Brunei	5–0 (W)	Former National Stadium, Kallang (A)	Football at the 1983 Southeast Asian Games	Zainal 42' (?); Japari 78' (o.g.); S. Singh 85'; A. Rukumaran 89'
14 September	South Korea	1–1 (D)	Stadium Merdeka, Kuala Lumpur (H)	1983 Merdeka Tournament	
19 September	Nepal	7–0 (W)	Sultan Muhammad IV Stadium, Kota Bharu, Kelantan (H)	1983 Merdeka Tournament	
22 September	Algeria	0–0 (D)	Stadium Merdeka, Kuala Lumpur (H)	1983 Merdeka Tournament	
24 September	Argentina	1–2 (L)	Sultan Ismail Nasiruddin Shah Stadium, Kuala Terengganu, Terengganu (H)	1983 Merdeka Tournament	
28 September	Bangladesh	1–0 (W)	Stadium Merdeka, Kuala Lumpur (H)	1983 Merdeka Tournament	
10 October	Saudi Arabia	3–1 (W)	Malaysia (H)	Football at the 1984 Summer Olympics – Men's qualification	
16 October	Indonesia	1–1 (D)	Singapore (A)	Football at the 1984 Summer Olympics – Men's qualification	
20 October	Singapore	2–0 (W)	Singapore (A)	Football at the 1984 Summer Olympics – Men's qualification	
22 October	India	3–3 (D)	Singapore (A)	Football at the 1984 Summer Olympics – Men's qualification	
25 October	India	2–0 (W)	Malaysia (H)	Football at the 1984 Summer Olympics – Men's qualification	
28 October	Indonesia	2–0 (W)	Malaysia (H)	Football at the 1984 Summer Olympics – Men's qualification	
1 November	Singapore	1–0 (W)	Malaysia (H)	Football at the 1984 Summer Olympics – Men's qualification	
11 November	Saudi Arabia	0–2 (L)	Saudi Arabia (A)	Football at the 1984 Summer Olympics – Men's qualification	

==== 1984 ====
1984 Results
Date	Opponent	Score*	Venue	Competition	Malaysia scores
31 March	New Zealand	0–2 (L)	New Zealand (A)	Friendly	
3 April	New Zealand	1–6 (L)	New Zealand (A)	Friendly	
16 April	Qatar	0–2 (L)	Singapore (A)	Football at the 1984 Summer Olympics – Men's qualification	
18 April	Japan	2–1 (W)	Singapore (A)	Football at the 1984 Summer Olympics – Men's qualification	
23 April	Thailand	0–0 (D)	Singapore (A)	Football at the 1984 Summer Olympics – Men's qualification	
26 April	Iraq	0–2 (L)	Singapore (A)	Football at the 1984 Summer Olympics – Men's qualification	
12 August	Singapore	1–0 (W)	Malaysia (H)	Friendly	
18 August	Singapore	0–0 (D)	Singapore (A)	Friendly	
24 August	Thailand	1–0 (W)	Stadium Merdeka, Kuala Lumpur (H)	1984 Merdeka Tournament	Zainal 42' (pen.)
26 August	Indonesia	2–2 (D)	Stadium Merdeka, Kuala Lumpur (H)	1984 Merdeka Tournament	
29 August	Liberia	3–1 (W)	Stadium Merdeka, Kuala Lumpur (H)	1984 Merdeka Tournament	Zainal 56', 60', 79' (pen.)
1 September	(Brazil) Minas Gerais XI	0–4 (L)	Stadium Merdeka, Kuala Lumpur (H)	1984 Merdeka Tournament	
4 September	Papua New Guinea	5–1 (W)	Stadium Merdeka, Kuala Lumpur (H)	1984 Merdeka Tournament	K. Gunasekaran 3'; Azizul 34'; Zainal 78'; Hassan 89'; Zulkifli 90'
7 September	South Korea	1–3 (L)	Stadium Merdeka, Kuala Lumpur (H)	1984 Merdeka Tournament	Zulkifli 64'
11 October	Pakistan	5–0 (W)	Calcutta (A)	1984 AFC Asian Cup qualification	
14 October	India	1–2 (L)	Calcutta (A)	1984 AFC Asian Cup qualification	
16 October	South Korea	0–0 (D)	Calcutta (A)	1984 AFC Asian Cup qualification	
18 October	North Yemen	4–1 (W)	Calcutta (A)	1984 AFC Asian Cup qualification	

==== 1985 ====
1985 Results
Date	Opponent	Score*	Venue	Competition	Malaysia scores
10 March	South Korea	1–0 (W)	Stadium Merdeka, Kuala Lumpur (H)	1986 FIFA World Cup qualification – AFC first round	Dollah 49'
16 March	Nepal	0–0 (D)	Dasarath Rangasala Stadium, Kathmandu (A)	1986 FIFA World Cup qualification – AFC first round	
31 March	Nepal	5–0 (W)	Stadium Merdeka, Kuala Lumpur (H)	1986 FIFA World Cup qualification – AFC first round	Zainal 4', 26', 33'; Dollah 29'; Yunus 40'
19 May	South Korea	0–2 (L)	Olympic Stadium, Seoul (A)	1986 FIFA World Cup qualification – AFC first round	
3 June	Bahrain	1–3 (L)	Dongdaemun Stadium, Seoul (A)	1985 President's Cup Football Tournament	Husin 36'
5 June	South Korea	0–6 (L)	Dongdaemun Stadium, Seoul (A)	1985 President's Cup Football Tournament	
24 July	(Wales) Swansea City A.F.C.	3–1 (W)	Stadium Merdeka, Kuala Lumpur (H)	1985 Merdeka Tournament	Lim Teong Kim 44', 82'; Zainal 67'
27 July	Indonesia	1–1 (D)	Stadium Merdeka, Kuala Lumpur (H)	1985 Merdeka Tournament	Lim Teong Kim 13' (pen.)
29 July	Ghana	1–0 (W)	Stadium Merdeka, Kuala Lumpur (H)	1985 Merdeka Tournament	Dollah 24'
1 August	South Korea	0–3 (L)	Stadium Merdeka, Kuala Lumpur (H)	1985 Merdeka Tournament	
13 October	Brunei	4–0 (W)	Singapore (A)	1985 Merlion Cup	
20 October	Singapore	0–2 (L)	Singapore (A)	1985 Merlion Cup	
23 October	Singapore	0–4 (L)	Singapore (A)	1985 Merlion Cup	
8 December	Thailand	1–1 (D)	Suphachalasai Stadium, Bangkok (A)	Football at the 1985 Southeast Asian Games	Dollah 76'
10 December	Philippines	6–0 (W)	Suphachalasai Stadium, Bangkok (A)	Football at the 1985 Southeast Asian Games	
15 December	Singapore	2–2 (D) (AET) (5 PSO 6)	Suphachalasai Stadium, Bangkok (A)	Football at the 1985 Southeast Asian Games	Zainal 48'; Khan Hung Meng 89'
16 December	Indonesia	1–0 (W)	Suphachalasai Stadium, Bangkok (A)	Football at the 1985 Southeast Asian Games	Lim Teong Kim 67'

==== 1986 ====
1986 Results
Date	Opponent	Score*	Venue	Competition	Malaysia scores
22 July	South Korea	1–0 (W)	Stadium Merdeka, Kuala Lumpur (H)	1986 Merdeka Tournament	Go Ue-suk 52' (o.g.)
24 July	India	3–0 (W)	Stadium Merdeka, Kuala Lumpur (H)	1986 Merdeka Tournament	Azhar 11'; Zainal 71', 74'
26 July	Thailand	2–0 (W)	Stadium Merdeka, Kuala Lumpur (H)	1986 Merdeka Tournament	Zainal 61'; Dollah 70'
28 July	Indonesia	3–0 (W)	Stadium Merdeka, Kuala Lumpur (H)	1986 Merdeka Tournament	
1 August	Japan	2–1 (W)	Stadium Merdeka, Kuala Lumpur (H)	1986 Merdeka Tournament	Zainal 56'; Dollah 119'
3 August	Czechoslovakia	3–0 (W)	Stadium Merdeka, Kuala Lumpur (H)	1986 Merdeka Tournament	Wong Hung Nung 28' (pen.); Zainal 47'; Dollah 70'
23 August	Algeria	2–2 (D)	Malaysia (H)	Friendly	
21 September	Saudi Arabia	1–3 (L)	Gwangju Mudeung Stadium, Gwangju (A)	Football at the 1986 Asian Games	Wong Hung Nung 12'
23 September	Qatar	1–1 (D)	Gwangju Mudeung Stadium, Gwangju (A)	Football at the 1986 Asian Games	Yusof 33'
27 September	Indonesia	0–1 (L)	Gwangju Mudeung Stadium, Gwangju (A)	Football at the 1986 Asian Games	
6 December	South Korea	1–2 (L)	Nepal (N)	Friendly	

==== 1987 ====
1987 Results
Date	Opponent	Score*	Venue	Competition	Malaysia scores
14 March	Thailand	0–1 (L)	Malaysia (H)	Football at the 1988 Summer Olympics – Men's qualification	
18 March	Thailand	2–2 (D)	Malaysia (H)	Football at the 1988 Summer Olympics – Men's qualification	
10 September	Singapore	0–0 (D)	Gelora Senayan Main Stadium, Jakarta (A)	Football at the 1987 Southeast Asian Games	
12 September	Burma	2–2 (D)	Gelora Senayan Main Stadium, Jakarta (A)	Football at the 1987 Southeast Asian Games	Khalid 41'; Radhi 81'
16 September	Thailand	2–0 (W)	Gelora Senayan Main Stadium, Jakarta (A)	Football at the 1987 Southeast Asian Games	Hassan 68'; Dollah 73'
20 September	Indonesia	0–1 (L)	Gelora Senayan Main Stadium, Jakarta (A)	Football at the 1987 Southeast Asian Games	
6 November	Oman	0–1 (L)	Oman (A)	Friendly	
8 November	Oman	2–2 (D)	Oman (A)	Friendly	
16 November	Qatar	2–2 (D)	Qatar (A)	Friendly	
18 November	Qatar	0–1 (L)	Qatar (A)	Friendly	
8 December	(Denmark) Vejle BK	3–1 (W)	Stadium Merdeka, Kuala Lumpur (H)	1987 Merdeka Tournament	Jelani 56'; Salehan 58'; Zainal 73'
11 December	(Sweden) Halmstads BK	0–1 (L)	Stadium Merdeka, Kuala Lumpur (H)	1987 Merdeka Tournament	
13 December	Czechoslovakia	0–2 (L)	Stadium Merdeka, Kuala Lumpur (H)	1987 Merdeka Tournament	
17 December	South Korea	0–1 (L)	Stadium Merdeka, Kuala Lumpur (H)	1987 Merdeka Tournament	

==== 1988 ====
1988 Results
Date	Opponent	Score*	Venue	Competition	Malaysia scores
7 April	Pakistan	4–0 (W)	Kuala Lumpur (H)	1988 AFC Asian Cup qualification	
11 April	Japan	0–1 (L)	Kuala Lumpur (H)	1988 AFC Asian Cup qualification	
14 April	Jordan	0–0 (D)	Kuala Lumpur (H)	1988 AFC Asian Cup qualification	
18 April	Kuwait	0–5 (L)	Kuala Lumpur (H)	1988 AFC Asian Cup qualification	
14 November	Saudi Arabia	0–6 (L)	Saudi Arabia (A)	Friendly	
27 November	Singapore	3–2 (W)	Singapore (A)	Friendly	
8 December	Indonesia	0–0 (D)	Stadium Merdeka, Kuala Lumpur (H)	1988 Merdeka Tournament	
10 December	Thailand	0–0 (D)	Stadium Merdeka, Kuala Lumpur (H)	1988 Merdeka Tournament	
12 December	Soviet Union	1–2 (L)	Stadium Merdeka, Kuala Lumpur (H)	1988 Merdeka Tournament	See Kim Seng 68' (pen.)

==== 1989 ====
1989 Results
Date	Opponent	Score*	Venue	Competition	Malaysia scores
28 January	Thailand	0–1 (L)	Thailand (A)	1989 King's Cup	
3 February	Indonesia	3–1 (W)	Thailand (A)	1989 King's Cup	
27 March	Qatar	0–1 (L)	Qatar (A)	Friendly	
11 August	(England) Everton	0–0 (D) (AET) (2 PSO 4)	Stadium Merdeka, Kuala Lumpur (H)	Friendly^{1XI}	
21 August	Philippines	3–0 (W)	Kuala Lumpur (H)	Football at the 1989 Southeast Asian Games	A. Anbalagan 4', 41'; Radhi 28'
23 August	Brunei	2–1 (W)	Kuala Lumpur (H)	Football at the 1989 Southeast Asian Games	Radhi 28'; P. Ravichandran 86'
25 August	Indonesia	2–0 (W)	Kuala Lumpur (H)	Football at the 1989 Southeast Asian Games	Lim Teong Kim 39', 52'
28 August	Thailand	1–0 (W)	Kuala Lumpur (H)	Football at the 1989 Southeast Asian Games	Zainal 71'
31 August	Singapore	3–1 (W)	Stadium Merdeka, Kuala Lumpur (H)	Football at the 1989 Southeast Asian Games	Borhan 8' (o.g.); Lim Teong Kim 59'; Dollah 60'

=== 1990–1999 results ===
==== 1990 ====
1990 Results
Date	Opponent	Score*	Venue	Competition	Malaysia scores
8 September	Yemen	0–1 (L)	Malaysia (H)	Friendly	
13 September	Singapore	0–3 (L)	Singapore (A)	Friendly	
24 September	Iran	0–3 (L)	Fengtai Stadium, Beijing (A)	Football at the 1990 Asian Games	
26 September	North Korea	0–0 (D)	Xiannongtan Stadium, Beijing (A)	Football at the 1990 Asian Games	

==== 1991 ====
1991 Results
Date	Opponent	Score*	Venue	Competition	Malaysia scores
4 February	China	2–2 (D)	Stadium Merdeka, Kuala Lumpur (H)	1991 Merdeka Tournament	Lim Teong Kim (?); Nidzam (?)
6 February	Indonesia	1–2 (L)	Stadium Merdeka, Kuala Lumpur (H)	1991 Merdeka Tournament	S. Singh 28'
8 February	(Austria) Admira Wacker	3–2 (W)	Stadium Merdeka, Kuala Lumpur (H)	1991 Merdeka Tournament	S. Balachandran 3'; Subadron 75', 86'
20 May	(England) Aston Villa	0–4 (L)	Stadium Merdeka, Kuala Lumpur (H)	Friendly^{1XI}	
12 June	England	2–4 (L)	Malaysia (H)	Friendly	Matlan 55', 77'
26 November	Indonesia	0–2 (L)	Rizal Memorial Stadium, Manila (A)	Football at the 1991 Southeast Asian Games	
28 November	Philippines	0–1 (L)	Rizal Memorial Stadium, Manila (A)	Football at the 1991 Southeast Asian Games	
30 November	Vietnam	2–1 (W)	Rizal Memorial Stadium, Manila (A)	Football at the 1991 Southeast Asian Games	Azman Adnan 24' 69'

==== 1992 ====
1992 Results
Date	Opponent	Score*	Venue	Competition	Malaysia scores
19 April	Singapore	1–1 (D)	Singapore (A)	1992 AFC Asian Cup qualification	
23 April	China	0–4 (L)	Singapore (A)	1992 AFC Asian Cup qualification	
25 April	Indonesia	1–1 (D)	Singapore (A)	1992 AFC Asian Cup qualification	
8 August	Indonesia	1–1 (D)	Indonesia (A)	Friendly	
11 August	Australia	1–0 (W)	Indonesia (A)	Friendly	
8 December	Singapore	0–3 (L)	Singapore (A)	1992 Merlion Cup	

==== 1993 ====
1993 Results
Date	Opponent	Score*	Venue	Competition	Malaysia scores
5 February	Singapore	2–1 (W)	Stadium Merdeka, Kuala Lumpur (H)	1993 Merdeka Tournament	Mubin 59'; Dollah 64'
7 February	Thailand	1–1 (D)	Stadium Merdeka, Kuala Lumpur (H)	1993 Merdeka Tournament	Dollah 44'
9 February	(Bulgaria) CSKA Sofia	0–0 (D)	Stadium Merdeka, Kuala Lumpur (H)	1993 Merdeka Tournament	
12 February	(Switzerland) Aarau	2–1 (W)	Stadium Merdeka, Kuala Lumpur (H)	1993 Merdeka Tournament	Mubin 20'; Azman 59'
14 February	South Korea	3–1 (W)	Stadium Merdeka, Kuala Lumpur (H)	1993 Merdeka Tournament	Dollah 3'; Azman 95', 118'
2 April	United Arab Emirates	0–1 (L)	Malaysia (H)	Friendly	
9 April	Oman	0–1 (L)	Oman (A)	Friendly	
1 May	Kuwait	1–1 (D)	Kuala Lumpur (H)	1994 FIFA World Cup qualification	Azman 59'
3 May	Saudi Arabia	1–1 (D)	Kuala Lumpur (H)	1994 FIFA World Cup qualification	Mubin 31'
5 May	Macau	9–0 (W)	Kuala Lumpur (H)	1994 FIFA World Cup qualification	Azman 6', 14', 74'; Azizol 32', 75'; A. Elangovan 42'; Mubin 47', 54'; Zainal 87'
14 May	Kuwait	0–2 (L)	Ta'if (A)	1994 FIFA World Cup qualification	
16 May	Saudi Arabia	0–3 (L)	Ta'if (A)	1994 FIFA World Cup qualification	
18 May	Macau	5–0 (W)	Ta'if (A)	1994 FIFA World Cup qualification	Azman 10', 43'; Azizol 74'; P. Ravindran 77', 85'

==== 1994 ====
1994 Results
Date	Opponent	Score*	Venue	Competition	Malaysia scores
22 September	Kuwait	1–2 (L)	Stadium Merdeka, Kuala Lumpur (H)	Friendly	Sanbagamaran 48'
1 October	Hong Kong	4–0 (W)	Hiroshima Stadium, Hiroshima (A)	Football at the 1994 Asian Games	Azizol 48'; Azman 53'; S. Thanasegar 80'; Dollah 88'
3 October	Uzbekistan	0–5 (L)	Hiroshima Stadium, Hiroshima (A)	Football at the 1994 Asian Games	
7 October	Saudi Arabia	1–2 (L)	Hiroshima Stadium, Hiroshima (A)	Football at the 1994 Asian Games	Dollah 44'
9 October	Thailand	1–1 (D)	Hiroshima Stadium, Hiroshima (A)	Football at the 1994 Asian Games	Azizol 26'

==== 1995 ====
1995 Results
Date	Opponent	Score*	Venue	Competition	Malaysia scores
7 May	(Brazil) Flamengo XI	1–1 (D)	Shah Alam Stadium, Shah Alam, Selangor (H)	Friendly^{1XI}	Badrul (?)
17 July	South Korea	2–1 (W)	Stadium Merdeka, Kuala Lumpur (H)	1995 Merdeka Tournament	Anuar 22'; Liew Kim Tu 28' (pen.)
21 July	Iraq	1–2 (L)	Stadium Merdeka, Kuala Lumpur (H)	1995 Merdeka Tournament	Anuar 89'
25 July	(Hungary) Vasas SC	0–2 (L)	Stadium Merdeka, Kuala Lumpur (H)	1995 Merdeka Tournament	
4 December	Vietnam	0–2 (L)	Chiang Mai (A)	Football at the 1995 Southeast Asian Games	
6 December	Thailand	0–0 (D)	Chiang Mai (A)	Football at the 1995 Southeast Asian Games	
8 December	Indonesia	0–3 (L)	Chiang Mai (A)	Football at the 1995 Southeast Asian Games	
10 December	Cambodia	9–0 (W)	Chiang Mai (A)	Football at the 1995 Southeast Asian Games	Anuar 6' 22' 70'; Dollah 17' 62' (pen.) 67'; Zainal 44'; Affendi 60'; Seng Kong 80'

==== 1996 ====
1996 Results
Date	Opponent	Score*	Venue	Competition	Malaysia scores
2 March	Indonesia	0–0 (D)	Kuala Lumpur (H)	1996 AFC Asian Cup qualification	
6 March	India	5–2 (W)	Kuala Lumpur (H)	1996 AFC Asian Cup qualification	
1 September	Singapore	1–1 (D)	Former National Stadium, Kallang (A)	1996 AFF Championship	K. Sanbagamaran 76'
4 September	Philippines	7–0 (W)	Former National Stadium, Kallang (A)	1996 AFF Championship	K. Sanbagamaran 36', 61', 89'; Adnan 43'; Shamsurin 53', 81'; M. Chandran 78'
8 September	Thailand	1–1 (D)	Former National Stadium, Kallang (A)	1996 AFF Championship	Zainal 59'
10 September	Brunei	6–0 (W)	Former National Stadium, Kallang (A)	1996 AFF Championship	K. Sanbagamaran 3'; Shamsurin 37'; Anuar 47', 60'; M. Chandran 82', 89'
13 September	Indonesia	3–1 (W)	Former National Stadium, Kallang (A)	1996 AFF Championship	K. Sanbagamaran 5'; Rusdee 16' (Note: Rec.Sport.Soccer Statistics Foundation (RSSSF) reports this as a Yap Wai Loon goal on the 16th minute.); Shamsurin 76'
15 September	Thailand	0–1 (L)	Former National Stadium, Kallang (A)	1996 AFF Championship	

==== 1997 ====
1997 Results
Date	Opponent	Score*	Venue	Competition	Malaysia scores
21 February	Finland	2-1 (W)	Stadium Merdeka, Kuala Lumpur (H)	1997 Dunhill Cup Malaysia	K. Sanbagamaran 6', 75'
23 February	Singapore	0-0 (D)	Stadium Merdeka, Kuala Lumpur (H)	1997 Dunhill Cup Malaysia	
25 February	China	2-0 (L)	Stadium Merdeka, Kuala Lumpur (H)	1997 Dunhill Cup Malaysia	
28 February	Bosnia and Herzegovina	0–1 (L)	Malaysia (H)	Friendly	
16 March	Bangladesh	2–0 (W)	Shah Alam Stadium, Shah Alam, Selangor (H)	1998 FIFA World Cup qualification	Azman 43'; Idris 87'
18 March	Saudi Arabia	0–0 (D)	Shah Alam Stadium, Shah Alam, Selangor (H)	1998 FIFA World Cup qualification	
20 March	Chinese Taipei	2–0 (W)	Shah Alam Stadium, Shah Alam, Selangor (H)	1998 FIFA World Cup qualification	Che 2'; Rosdee 16'
27 March	Chinese Taipei	0–0 (D)	Prince Abdullah al-Faisal Stadium, Jeddah (A)	1998 FIFA World Cup qualification	
29 March	Saudi Arabia	0–3 (L)	Prince Abdullah al-Faisal Stadium, Jeddah (A)	1998 FIFA World Cup qualification	
31 March	Bangladesh	1–0 (W)	Prince Abdullah al-Faisal Stadium, Jeddah (A)	1998 FIFA World Cup qualification	Zainal (?)
5 October	Vietnam	1–0 (W)	Gelora Senayan Main Stadium, Jakarta (A)	Football at the 1997 Southeast Asian Games	Azmi 23'
7 October	Philippines	4–0 (W)	Gelora Senayan Main Stadium, Jakarta (A)	Football at the 1997 Southeast Asian Games	Azmi 8' 34' 68'; Zami 55'
9 October	Indonesia	0–4 (L)	Gelora Senayan Main Stadium, Jakarta (A)	Football at the 1997 Southeast Asian Games	
14 October	Laos	0–1 (L)	Gelora Senayan Main Stadium, Jakarta (A)	Football at the 1997 Southeast Asian Games	

==== 1998 ====
1998 Results
Date	Opponent	Score*	Venue	Competition	Malaysia scores
30 June	China	1–1 (D)	Malaysia (H)	Friendly	
26 August	Singapore	0–2 (L)	Hàng Đẫy Stadium, Hanoi (A)	1998 AFF Championship	
28 August	Laos	0–0 (D)	Hàng Đẫy Stadium, Hanoi (A)	1998 AFF Championship	
30 August	Vietnam	0–1 (L)	Hàng Đẫy Stadium, Hanoi (A)	1998 AFF Championship	

==== 1999 ====
1999 Results
Date	Opponent	Score*	Venue	Competition	Malaysia scores
30 January	Bulgaria	1-1 (D)	Thống Nhất Stadium, Ho Chi Minh City (H)	1999 Dunhill Cup Vietnam	G. Shanmugan 21'
1 February	South Korea	3-0 (L)	Thống Nhất Stadium, Ho Chi Minh City (H)	1999 Dunhill Cup Vietnam	
3 February	China	7-1 (L)	Thống Nhất Stadium, Ho Chi Minh City (H)	1999 Dunhill Cup Vietnam	Zami Mohd Noor 16'
1 July	New Zealand	2–1 (W)	Malaysia (H)	Friendly	
3 July	New Zealand	1–5 (L)	Malaysia (H)	Friendly	
11 July	Uzbekistan	0–3 (L)	Uzbekistan (A)	Friendly	
19 July	(England) Arsenal (Note: See 1998–99 Arsenal F.C. season.)	0–2 (L)	National Stadium, Bukit Jalil, Kuala Lumpur (H)	Friendly^{1XI}	
31 July	Singapore	1–2 (L)	Berakas Sports Complex, Bandar Seri Begawan (A)	Football at the 1999 Southeast Asian Games	Azizul 87'
2 August	Indonesia	0–6 (L)	Berakas Sports Complex, Bandar Seri Begawan (A)	Football at the 1999 Southeast Asian Games	
4 August	Cambodia	7–2 (W)	Berakas Sports Complex, Bandar Seri Begawan (A)	Football at the 1999 Southeast Asian Games	Shahrul 8', 46', 89'; Rohaimi 22', 71'; Rusdi 66', 81'
6 August	Brunei	2–0 (W)	Berakas Sports Complex, Bandar Seri Begawan (A)	Football at the 1999 Southeast Asian Games	Asmawi 18'; Azizul 85'
28 December	Singapore	1–0 (W)	United Arab Emirates (N)	Friendly	

=== 2000–2009 results ===
==== 2000 ====
2000 Results
Date	Opponent	Score*	Venue	Competition	Malaysia scores
7 February	Singapore	1–3 (L)	Singapore (A)	Friendly	
15 February	Maldives	2–0 (W)	Malaysia (H)	Friendly	
17 February	Maldives	3–0 (W)	Malaysia (H)	Friendly	
25 March	Chinese Taipei	3–0 (W)	Shah Alam Stadium, Shah Alam, Selangor (H)	2000 AFC Asian Cup qualification	Noor 34'; Rusdi 82', 86'
27 March	North Korea	1–1 (D)	Shah Alam Stadium, Shah Alam, Selangor (H)	2000 AFC Asian Cup qualification	Nizaruddin 58'
29 March	Thailand	3–2 (W)	Shah Alam Stadium, Shah Alam, Selangor (H)	2000 AFC Asian Cup qualification	Rusdi 14'; Noor 21' (pen.); Anuar 48'
4 April	Chinese Taipei	2–3 (L)	Suphachalasai Stadium, Bangkok (A)	2000 AFC Asian Cup qualification	
6 April	North Korea	1–4 (L)	Suphachalasai Stadium, Bangkok (A)	2000 AFC Asian Cup qualification	Ooi Hoe Guan 26'
9 April	Thailand	2–3 (L)	Suphachalasai Stadium, Bangkok (A)	2000 AFC Asian Cup qualification	Rusdi 35'; Nizaruddin 60'
6 August	Burma	6–0 (W)	Malaysia (H)	Friendly	
9 August	Burma	1–2 (L)	Malaysia (H)	Friendly	
13 August	New Zealand	0–0 (D)	Malaysia (H)	2000 Merdeka Tournament	
15 August	Oman	2–0 (W)	Malaysia (H)	2000 Merdeka Tournament	Anuar 53'; Rusdi 84'
17 August	Malaysia	3–1 (W)	Malaysia (H)	2000 Merdeka Tournament	S. Sivaram 16'; R. Suresh 65'; Ooi Hoe Guan 89'
19 August	New Zealand	0–2 (L)	Malaysia (H)	2000 Merdeka Tournament	
5 November	Vietnam	0–0 (D)	Tinsulanon Stadium, Songkhla (A)	2000 AFF Championship	
7 November	Laos	5–0 (W)	Tinsulanon Stadium, Songkhla (A)	2000 AFF Championship	Rusdi 24', 54'; Azman 31' (pen.); Hairuddin 43'; Shahrul 89'
9 November	Cambodia	3–2 (W)	Tinsulanon Stadium, Songkhla (A)	2000 AFF Championship	Azman 21'; Hairuddin 47'; Shahrul 62'
13 November	Singapore	1–0 (W)	Tinsulanon Stadium, Songkhla (A)	2000 AFF Championship	Azman 63'
16 November	Thailand	0–2 (L)	Rajamangala Stadium, Bangkok (A)	2000 AFF Championship	
16 November	Vietnam	3–0 (W)	Rajamangala Stadium, Bangkok (A)	2000 AFF Championship	Rosdi 42'; Rusdi 59', 90'

==== 2001 ====
2001 Results
Date	Opponent	Score*	Venue	Competition	Malaysia scores
5 February	Fiji	1–4 (L)	Fiji (A)	Friendly	
7 February	Fiji	0–2 (L)	Fiji (A)	Friendly	
9 February	Fiji	2–1 (W)	Fiji (A)	Friendly	
4 March	Qatar	1–5 (L)	Hong Kong Stadium, So Kon Po (A)	2002 FIFA World Cup qualification – AFC first round	Rosdi 9'
8 March	Hong Kong	2–0 (W)	Hong Kong Stadium, So Kon Po (A)	2002 FIFA World Cup qualification – AFC first round	Rizal 46', 79'
11 March	Palestine	0–1 (L)	Hong Kong Stadium, So Kon Po (A)	2002 FIFA World Cup qualification – AFC first round	
20 March	Qatar	0–0 (D)	Jassim bin Hamad Stadium, Doha (A)	2002 FIFA World Cup qualification – AFC first round	
23 March	Hong Kong	1–2 (L)	Jassim bin Hamad Stadium, Doha (A)	2002 FIFA World Cup qualification – AFC first round	Hairuddin 86'
25 March	Palestine	4–3 (W)	Jassim bin Hamad Stadium, Doha (A)	2002 FIFA World Cup qualification – AFC first round	Rizal 21', 62' (pen.); Hairuddin 53'; Irwan 56'
17 July	(England) Manchester United (Note: See 2001–02 Manchester United F.C. season.)	0–6 (L)	National Stadium, Bukit Jalil, Kuala Lumpur (H)	Friendly^{1XI}	

==== 2002 ====
2002 Results
Date	Opponent	Score*	Venue	Competition	Malaysia scores
17 May	Burma	1–1 (D)	Burma (A)	Friendly	
19 May	Burma	0–0 (D)	Burma (A)	Friendly	
25 May	Brazil	0–4 (L)	Malaysia (H)	Friendly	
16 July	Singapore	1–2 (L)	Malaysia (H)	Friendly	
29 November	Jordan	0–1 (L)	United Arab Emirates (N)	Friendly	
11 December	Cambodia	5–0 (W)	Malaysia (H)	Friendly	
18 December	Singapore	4–0 (W)	National Stadium, Singapore, Kallang (A)	2002 AFF Championship	Rizal 30'; Indra Putra 49', 65'; Nizaruddin 69'
20 December	Thailand	3–1 (W)	National Stadium, Singapore, Kallang (A)	2002 AFF Championship	Rizal 45'; Hazman 66'; Indra Putra 86'
22 December	Laos	1–1 (D)	Bishan Stadium, Bishan (A)	2002 AFF Championship	Nizam 27' (pen.)
27 December	Indonesia	0–1 (L)	Gelora Bung Karno Stadium, Jakarta (A)	2002 AFF Championship	
29 December	Vietnam	1–2 (L)	Gelora Bung Karno Stadium, Jakarta (A)	2002 AFF Championship	Indra Putra 55'

==== 2003 ====
2003 Results
Date	Opponent	Score*	Venue	Competition	Malaysia scores
26 September	Indonesia	1–1 (D)	Malaysia (H)	Friendly	
8 October	Burma	4–0 (W)	National Stadium, Bukit Jalil, Kuala Lumpur (H)	2004 AFC Asian Cup qualification	Hazman 34', 80'; Cassidy 67'; Tun Lin Soe 86' (o.g.)
10 October	Iraq	0–0 (D)	National Stadium, Bukit Jalil, Kuala Lumpur (H)	2004 AFC Asian Cup qualification	
12 October	Bahrain	2–2 (D)	National Stadium, Bukit Jalil, Kuala Lumpur (H)	2004 AFC Asian Cup qualification	Shukor 80'; Norhafiz 90'
20 October	Iraq	1–5 (L)	Bahrain National Stadium, Manama (A)	2004 AFC Asian Cup qualification	Hairuddin 53'
22 October	Bahrain	1–3 (L)	Bahrain National Stadium, Manama (A)	2004 AFC Asian Cup qualification	Indra Putra 37'
24 October	Burma	1–2 (L)	Bahrain National Stadium, Manama (A)	2004 AFC Asian Cup qualification	Hairuddin 86'

==== 2004 ====
2004 Results
Date	Opponent	Score*	Venue	Competition	Malaysia scores
7 February	Japan	0–4 (L)	Japan (A)	Friendly	
18 February	Hong Kong	1–3 (L)	Darul Makmur Stadium, Kuantan, Pahang (H)	2006 FIFA World Cup qualification – AFC second round	Rosdi 39' (pen.)
31 March	Kuwait	0–2 (L)	Darul Makmur Stadium, Kuantan, Pahang (H)	2006 FIFA World Cup qualification – AFC second round	
9 June	China	0–4 (L)	TEDA Football Stadium, Tianjin (A)	2006 FIFA World Cup qualification – AFC second round	
12 July	Singapore	2–0 (W)	Malaysia (H)	Friendly	
17 July	(England) Norwich City	0–1 (L)	National Stadium, Bukit Jalil, Kuala Lumpur (H)	Friendly^{1XI}	
19 August	Thailand	2–1 (W)	Thailand (A)	Friendly	
8 September	China	0–1 (L)	City Stadium, George Town, Penang (H)	2006 FIFA World Cup qualification – AFC second round	
13 October	Hong Kong	0–2 (L)	Mong Kok Stadium, Kowloon (A)	2006 FIFA World Cup qualification – AFC second round	
1 November	Singapore	2–1 (W)	Singapore (A)	Friendly	
17 November	Kuwait	1–6 (L)	Kazma SC Stadium, Kuwait City (A)	2006 FIFA World Cup qualification – AFC second round	Amri 19'
8 December	Timor-Leste	5–0 (W)	National Stadium, Bukit Jalil, Kuala Lumpur (H)	2004 AFF Championship	Liew Kit Kong 27'; Amri 47', 83'; Fadzli 67'; Shukor 85'
10 December	Philippines	4–1 (W)	National Stadium, Bukit Jalil, Kuala Lumpur (H)	2004 AFF Championship	Liew Kit Kong 17'; Khalid 67', 77' (pen.); Kaironnisam 74'
12 December	Burma	0–1 (L)	National Stadium, Bukit Jalil, Kuala Lumpur (H)	2004 AFF Championship	
14 December	Thailand	2–1 (W)	National Stadium, Bukit Jalil, Kuala Lumpur (H)	2004 AFF Championship	Khalid 63', 65'
28 December	Indonesia	2–1 (W)	Gelora Bung Karno Stadium, Jakarta (A)	2004 AFF Championship	Liew Kit Kong 28', 47'

==== 2005 ====
2005 Results
Date	Opponent	Score*	Venue	Competition	Malaysia scores
3 January	Indonesia	1–4 (L)	National Stadium, Bukit Jalil, Kuala Lumpur (H)	2004 AFF Championship	Khalid 28'
15 January	Burma	2–1 (W)	Jalan Besar Stadium, Jalan Besar (A)	2004 AFF Championship	Khalid 15'; Nor 56'
11 April	Morocco	0–0 (D)	King Fahd Stadium, Ta'if (A)	2005 Islamic Solidarity Games	
13 April	Pakistan	2–0 (W)	King Fahd Stadium, Ta'if (A)	2005 Islamic Solidarity Games	Fadzli 71', 73'
15 April	Syria	1–3 (L)	King Fahd Stadium, Ta'if (A)	2005 Islamic Solidarity Games	Tharmini 84'
4 June	Singapore	0–2 (L)	Singapore (A)	Friendly	
8 June	Singapore	1–2 (L)	Malaysia (H)	Friendly	

==== 2006 ====
2006 Results
Date	Opponent	Score*	Venue	Competition	Malaysia scores
19 February	New Zealand	0–1 (L)	Queen Elizabeth II Park, Christchurch (A)	Friendly	
23 February	New Zealand	1–2 (L)	Queen Elizabeth II Park, Christchurch (A)	Friendly	
31 May	Singapore	0–0 (D)	Singapore (A)	Friendly	
3 June	Singapore	0–0 (D)	Malaysia (H)	Friendly	
23 August	Indonesia	1–1 (D)	Shah Alam Stadium, Shah Alam, Selangor (H)	2006 Merdeka Tournament	Ridwan 77' (o.g.)
25 August	Thailand	2–1 (W)	Shah Alam Stadium, Shah Alam, Selangor (H)	2006 Merdeka Tournament	Indra Putra 40', 78'
27 August	Burma	1–2 (L)	Shah Alam Stadium, Shah Alam, Selangor (H)	2006 Merdeka Tournament	Indra Putra 13' (pen.)

==== 2007 ====
2007 Results
Date	Opponent	Score*	Venue	Competition	Malaysia scores
12 January	Philippines	4–0 (W)	Suphachalasai Stadium, Bangkok (A)	2007 AFF Championship	Hairuddin 9', 80'; Nizaruddin 16' del Rosario 69' (o.g.)
14 January	Burma	0–0 (D)	Suphachalasai Stadium, Bangkok (A)	2007 AFF Championship	
16 January	Singapore	1–1 (D) (AET) (4 PSO 5)	Suphachalasai Stadium, Bangkok (A)	2007 AFF Championship	
24 March	Sri Lanka	4–1 (W)	Sri Lanka (A)	Friendly	
26 March	Sri Lanka	1–2 (L)	Sri Lanka (A)	Friendly	
18 June	Cambodia	6–0 (W)	Malaysia (H)	Friendly	
21 June	United Arab Emirates	1–3 (L)	Malaysia (H)	Friendly	
28 June	Jamaica	0–2 (L)	Malaysia (H)	Friendly	
10 July	China	1–5 (L)	National Stadium, Bukit Jalil, Kuala Lumpur (H)	2007 AFC Asian Cup	Indra Putra 74'
14 July	Uzbekistan	0–5 (L)	National Stadium, Bukit Jalil, Kuala Lumpur (H)	2007 AFC Asian Cup	
18 July	Iran	0–2 (L)	National Stadium, Bukit Jalil, Kuala Lumpur (H)	2007 AFC Asian Cup	
21 October	Bahrain	1–4 (L)	Bahrain National Stadium, Manama (A)	2010 FIFA World Cup qualification – AFC first round	Bunyamin 45+2'
28 October	Bahrain	0–0 (D)	Shah Alam Stadium, Shah Alam, Selangor (H)	2010 FIFA World Cup qualification – AFC first round	

==== 2008 ====
2008 Results
Date	Opponent	Score*	Venue	Competition	Malaysia scores
6 June	Indonesia	1–1 (D)	Gelora 10 November Stadium, Surabaya (A)	Friendly	Shukor 32'
22 July	India	1–1 (D)	Gachibowli Athletic Stadium, Hyderabad, Telangana (A)	Friendly	Indra Putra 75' (pen.)
29 July	(England) Chelsea (Note: See 2008–09 Chelsea F.C. season.)	0–2 (L)	Shah Alam Stadium, Shah Alam, Selangor (H)	Friendly^{1XI}	
10 October	Pakistan	4–1 (W)	National Stadium, Bukit Jalil, Kuala Lumpur (H)	Friendly	Safee 42'; Zaquan 60'; Hairuddin 70'; Khyril 81'
15 October	Nepal	4–0 (W)	MBPJ Stadium, Kelana Jaya, Selangor (H)	2008 Merdeka Tournament	Indra Putra 20'; Safee 25', 48'; Khyril 52'
17 October	Sierra Leone	4–0 (W)	MBPJ Stadium, Kelana Jaya, Selangor (H)	2008 Merdeka Tournament^{1}	Indra Putra 66'; Safee 72'; Aidil 77'; Zaquan 92'
20 October	Afghanistan	6–0 (W)	National Stadium, Bukit Jalil, Kuala Lumpur (H)	2008 Merdeka Tournament	Ashaari 21', 64'; Nizaruddin 41'; Zaquan 44'; Safee 65'; Hairuddin 87'
23 October	Burma	4–0 (W)	National Stadium, Bukit Jalil, Kuala Lumpur (H)	2008 Merdeka Tournament	Indra Putra 25', 75' (pen.); Safee 61'; Amirul 83'
25 October	Vietnam	0–0 (D) (AET) (5 PSO 6) (L)	National Stadium, Bukit Jalil, Kuala Lumpur (H)	2008 Merdeka Tournament^{1}	Indra Putra (pen.); Safee (pen.) ??? (pen.); Ashaari (pen.); Daudsu (pen.)
12 November	Vietnam	3–0 (W)	Thuwunna YTC Stadium, Yangon (A)	2008 Grand Royal Challenge Cup^{1}	Indra Putra 26'; Amirul 40'; Hardi 55'
14 November	(South Korea) Ulsan Hyundai	1–1 (D)	Thuwunna YTC Stadium, Yangon (A)	2008 Grand Royal Challenge Cup^{1}	Zaquan 52'
18 November	Burma	1–4 (L)	Thuwunna YTC Stadium, Yangon (A)	2008 Grand Royal Challenge Cup	Amirul 75'
29 November	Singapore	2–2 (D)	MBPJ Stadium, Kelana Jaya, Selangor (H)	Friendly	Amirul 22'; Hardi 74'
6 December	Laos	3–0 (W)	Sarakul Stadium, Phuket (A)	2008 AFF Championship	Safee 69', 88'; Indra Putra 73'
8 December	Vietnam	2–3 (L)	Sarakul Stadium, Phuket (A)	2008 AFF Championship	Indra Putra 20', 85'
10 December	Thailand	0–3 (L)	Sarakul Stadium, Phuket (A)	2008 AFF Championship	

==== 2009 ====
2009 Results
Date	Opponent	Score*	Venue	Competition	Malaysia scores
21 January	United Arab Emirates	0–5 (L)	Kuala Lumpur Stadium, Kuala Lumpur (H)	2011 AFC Asian Cup qualification	
12 July	Zimbabwe^{2}	4–0 (W)	Kuala Lumpur Stadium, Kuala Lumpur (H)	Friendly^{1}	Safiq 45' (pen.); Indra Putra 50'; Farderin 85'; Norshahrul 90'
14 July	Zimbabwe^{2}	1–0 (W)	Shah Alam Stadium, Shah Alam, Selangor (H)	Friendly^{1}	V. Thirumurugan 40'
18 July	(England) Manchester United (Note: See 2009–10 Manchester United F.C. season.)	2–3 (L)	National Stadium, Bukit Jalil, Kuala Lumpur (H)	Friendly^{1XI}	Amri 45', 52'
20 July	(England) Manchester United	0–2 (L)	National Stadium, Bukit Jalil, Kuala Lumpur (H)	Friendly^{1XI}	
8 August	Kedah	3–1 (W)	Darul Aman Stadium, Alor Setar, Kedah (H)	Friendly^{1}	Zaquan; Amirul; Norshahrul
12 August	Kenya	0–0 (D)	Shah Alam Stadium, Shah Alam, Selangor (H)	Friendly	
15 August	China	0–0 (D)	Shah Alam Stadium, Shah Alam, Selangor (H)	Friendly	
30 August	Saudi Arabia	1–2 (L)	King Fahd International Stadium, Riyadh (A)	Friendly	Shakir 85'
5 September	Jordan	0–0 (D)	Amman (A)	Friendly	
11 September	Lesotho	5–0 (W)	Kuala Lumpur Stadium, Kuala Lumpur (H)	Friendly	Zaquan 41'; Norshahrul 44'; Manaf 78', 90'; Amirul 88'
5 November	Kuala Lumpur	2–1 (W)	Kuala Lumpur Stadium, Kuala Lumpur (H)	Friendly^{1}	Norshahrul 28'; Safiq 36'
14 November	Uzbekistan	1–3 (L)	Pakhtakor Stadium, Tashkent (A)	2011 AFC Asian Cup qualification	Zaquan 68'
18 November	Uzbekistan	1–3 (L)	Kuala Lumpur Stadium, Kuala Lumpur (H)	2011 AFC Asian Cup qualification	Baddrol 70'
26 November	Maldives	0–1 (L)	UiTM Stadium, Shah Alam, Selangor (H)	Friendly^{1}	
30 December	Syria	4–1 (W)	Kuala Lumpur Stadium, Kuala Lumpur (H)	Friendly^{1}	Safiq 31' (pen.), 63' (pen.); Zaquan 77'; K. Gurusamy 90'

^{2} FIFA revoked the 'A' international classification for both matches once it was discovered that a Zimbabwe club team, Monomotapa United impersonated as the Zimbabwe national team and were not approved by the Zimbabwe Football Association (ZIFA).

=== 2010–2019 results ===
==== 2010 ====
2010 Results
Date	Opponent	Score*	Venue	Competition	Malaysia scores
6 January	United Arab Emirates	0–1 (L)	Maktoum bin Rashid Al Maktoum Stadium, Dubai (A)	2011 AFC Asian Cup qualification	
27 February	Yemen	1–0 (W)	National Stadium, Bukit Jalil, Kuala Lumpur (H)	Friendly	Baddrol 55'
3 September	Oman	0–3 (L)	Al-Wakrah Stadium, Al Wakrah (A)	Friendly	
1 December	Indonesia	1–5 (L)	Gelora Bung Karno Stadium, Jakarta (A)	2010 AFF Championship	Norshahrul 18'
4 December	Thailand	0–0 (D)	Gelora Bung Karno Stadium, Jakarta (A)	2010 AFF Championship	
7 December	Laos	5–1 (W)	Gelora Sriwijaya Stadium, Palembang (A)	2010 AFF Championship	Amri 4', 41'; Amirul 74'; Norshahrul 77'; Jasuli 90+1'
15 December	Vietnam	2–0 (W)	National Stadium, Bukit Jalil, Kuala Lumpur (H)	2010 AFF Championship	Safee 61', 80'
18 December	Vietnam	0–0 (D)	Mỹ Đình National Stadium, Hanoi (A)	2010 AFF Championship	
26 December	Indonesia	3–0 (W)	National Stadium, Bukit Jalil, Kuala Lumpur (H)	2010 AFF Championship	Safee 61', 73'; Ashaari 68'
29 December	Indonesia	1–2 (L)	Gelora Bung Karno Stadium, Jakarta (A)	2010 AFF Championship	Safee 54'

==== 2011 ====
2011 Results
Date	Opponent	Score*	Venue	Competition	Malaysia scores
9 February	Hong Kong	2–0 (W)	Shah Alam Stadium, Shah Alam, Selangor (H)	Friendly	Safiq 44'; Amirul 90+2'
18 June	Myanmar	2–0 (W)	Sultan Muhammad IV Stadium, Kota Bharu, Kelantan (H)	Friendly	Amirul 28'; Baddrol 54'
29 June	Chinese Taipei	2–1 (W)	National Stadium, Bukit Jalil, Kuala Lumpur (H)	2014 FIFA World Cup qualification	Safiq 28'; Aidil 55'
3 July	Chinese Taipei	2–3 (L)	Taipei Municipal Stadium, Taipei (A)	2014 FIFA World Cup qualification	Aidil 8'; Safiq 40'
23 July	Singapore	3–5 (L)	Jalan Besar Stadium, Jalan Besar, Kallang (A)	2014 FIFA World Cup qualification	Safee 1', 71'; Abdul Hadi 70'
28 July	Singapore	1–1 (D)	National Stadium, Bukit Jalil, Kuala Lumpur (H)	2014 FIFA World Cup qualification	Safee 58'
7 October	Australia	0–5 (L)	Canberra, Australian Capital Territory (A)	Friendly	
13 November	India	1–1 (D)	Indira Gandhi Athletic Stadium, Guwahati, Assam (A)	Friendly	Safiq 42'
16 November	India	2–3 (L)	Salt Lake Stadium, Kolkata, West Bengal (A)	Friendly	Safee 45', 60'

==== 2012 ====
2012 Results
Date	Opponent	Score*	Venue	Competition	Malaysia scores
29 February	Philippines	1–1 (D)	Rizal Memorial Stadium, Manila (A)	Friendly	Shakir 90+1'
28 April	Sri Lanka	6–0 (W)	Shah Alam Stadium, Shah Alam, Selangor (H)	Friendly	Wan 25', 26'; Hazwan 73', 83', 90'; Azamuddin 86'
1 June	Philippines	0–0 (D)	Shah Alam Stadium, Shah Alam, Selangor (H)	Friendly	
8 June	Singapore	2–2 (D)	Jalan Besar Stadium, Jalan Besar, Kallang (A)	Friendly	Azamuddin 43'; Safiq 60'
12 June	Singapore	2–0 (W)	Shah Alam Stadium, Shah Alam, Selangor (H)	Friendly	Shakir 19'; Safiq 61'
11 September	Vietnam	0–2 (L)	Shah Alam Stadium, Shah Alam, Selangor (H)	Friendly	
16 October	Hong Kong	3–0 (W)	Mong Kok Stadium, Kowloon (A)	Friendly	Safee 59'; Safiq 82'; Fakri 90+2'
3 November	Vietnam	0–1 (L)	Mỹ Đình National Stadium, Hanoi (A)	Friendly	
7 November	Thailand	0–2 (L)	SCG Stadium, Nonthaburi (A)	Friendly	
14 November	Hong Kong	1–1 (D)	Shah Alam Stadium, Shah Alam, Selangor (H)	Friendly	Safee 58'
20 November	Bangladesh	1–1 (D)	National Stadium, Bukit Jalil, Kuala Lumpur (H)	Friendly	Khyril 22'
25 November	Singapore	0–3 (L)	National Stadium, Bukit Jalil, Kuala Lumpur (H)	2012 AFF Championship	
28 November	Laos	4–1 (W)	National Stadium, Bukit Jalil, Kuala Lumpur (H)	2012 AFF Championship	Safiq 15'; Safee 66'; Wan 75'; Khyril 79'
1 December	Indonesia	2–0 (W)	National Stadium, Bukit Jalil, Kuala Lumpur (H)	2012 AFF Championship	Azamuddin 26'; Mahali 29'
9 December	Thailand	1–1 (D)	National Stadium, Bukit Jalil, Kuala Lumpur (H)	2012 AFF Championship	Norshahrul 48'
13 December	Thailand	0–2 (L)	Supachalasai Stadium, Bangkok (A)	2012 AFF Championship	

==== 2013 ====
2013 Results
Date	Opponent	Score*	Venue	Competition	Malaysia scores
6 February	Qatar	0–2 (L)	Jassim bin Hamad Stadium, Doha (A)	2015 AFC Asian Cup qualification	
22 March	Yemen	2–1 (W)	Shah Alam Stadium, Shah Alam, Selangor (H)	2015 AFC Asian Cup qualification	Azamuddin 27'; Khyril 80'
10 September	China	0–2 (L)	Tianjin Olympic Centre Stadium, Tianjin (A)	Friendly	
15 October	Bahrain	1–1 (D)	National Stadium, Bukit Jalil, Kuala Lumpur (H)	2015 AFC Asian Cup qualification	Norshahrul 71'
8 November	Kuwait	0–3 (L)	Al-Sadaqua Walsalam Stadium, Kuwait City (A)	Friendly	
15 November	Bahrain	0–1 (L)	Bahrain National Stadium, Riffa (A)	2015 AFC Asian Cup qualification	
19 November	Qatar	0–1 (L)	National Stadium, Bukit Jalil, Kuala Lumpur (H)	2015 AFC Asian Cup qualification	

==== 2014 ====
2014 Results
Date	Opponent	Score*	Venue	Competition	Malaysia scores
1 March	Philippines	0–0 (D)	MP Selayang Stadium, Selayang, Selangor (H)	Friendly	
5 March	Yemen	2–1 (W)	Tahnoun bin Mohammed Stadium, Al Ain (A)	2015 AFC Asian Cup qualification	Amri 16'; Fakri 77'
27 April	Philippines	0–0 (D)	Cebu City Sports Complex, Cebu City (A)	Friendly	
8 August	Tajikistan	1–4 (L)	Pamir Stadium, Dushanbe (A)	Friendly	Amri 43' (pen.)
14 September	Indonesia	0–2 (L)	Gelora Delta Stadium, Sidoarjo (A)	Friendly	
20 September	Cambodia	4–1 (W)	Shah Alam Stadium, Shah Alam, Selangor (H)	Friendly	Kalang Tie 8', 65'; Daravorn 15' (o.g.); Baddrol 82'
12 November	Syria	0–3 (L)	Shah Alam Stadium, Shah Alam, Selangor (H)	Friendly	
16 November	Vietnam	1–3 (L)	Mỹ Đình National Stadium, Hanoi (A)	Friendly	Amri 22'
23 November	Myanmar	0–0 (D)	Jalan Besar Stadium, Jalan Besar, Kallang (A)	2014 AFF Championship	
26 November	Thailand	2–3 (L)	Jalan Besar Stadium, Jalan Besar, Kallang (A)	2014 AFF Championship	Amri 28'; Safiq 60'
29 November	Singapore	3–1 (W)	National Stadium, Singapore, Kallang (A)	2014 AFF Championship	Safee 61'; Safiq 90+3' (pen.); Indra Putra 90+5'
7 December	Vietnam	1–2 (L)	Shah Alam Stadium, Shah Alam, Selangor (H)	2014 AFF Championship	Safiq 14' (pen.)
11 December	Vietnam	4–2 (W)	Mỹ Đình National Stadium, Hanoi (A)	2014 AFF Championship	Safiq 4' (pen.); Norshahrul 16'; Đinh Tiến Thành 29' (o.g.); Shukor 43'
17 December	Thailand	0–2 (L)	Rajamangala Stadium, Bangkok (A)	2014 AFF Championship	
20 December	Thailand	3–2 (W)	National Stadium, Bukit Jalil, Kuala Lumpur (H)	2014 AFF Championship	Safiq 7' (pen.), 58'; Indra Putra 45+2'

==== 2015–2019 ====
2010–2019
Win Draw Defeat
M	Opponent	Date	Result	Event
	Oman	26 March 2015	0–6	(Oman) Friendly
	Hong Kong	6 June 2015	0–0	(Malaysia) Friendly
	Timor-Leste	11 June 2015	1–1	(Malaysia) World Cup QR2
	Palestine	16 June 2015	0–6	(Malaysia) World Cup QR2
	Bangladesh	29 August 2015	0–0	(Malaysia) Friendly
	United Arab Emirates	3 September 2015	0–10	(United Arab Emirates) World Cup QR2
	Saudi Arabia	8 September 2015	0–3 awd.	(Malaysia) World Cup QR2
	Laos	8 October 2015	3–1	(Malaysia) Friendly
	Timor-Leste	13 October 2015	1–0	(Timor-Leste) World Cup QR2
	Palestine	12 November 2015	0–6	(Palestine) World Cup QR2
	United Arab Emirates	17 November 2015	1–2	(Malaysia) World Cup QR2
	Saudi Arabia	24 March 2016	0–2	(Saudi Arabia) World Cup QR2
	Macau	28 March 2016	0–0	(Malaysia) Friendly
	Myanmar	28 May 2016	0–0	(Myanmar) Friendly
	Timor-Leste	2 June 2016	3–0	(Malaysia) Asian Cup PO
	Timor-Leste	6 June 2016	3–0	(Malaysia) Asian Cup PO
	Papua New Guinea	17 June 2016	0–2	(Papua New Guinea) Friendly
	Fiji	26 June 2016	1–1	(Indonesia) Friendly
	Indonesia	6 September 2016	0–3	(Indonesia) Friendly
	Singapore	7 October 2016	0–0	(Singapore) Friendly
	Afghanistan	11 October 2016	1–1	(Malaysia) Friendly
	Papua New Guinea	14 November 2016	2–1	(Malaysia) Friendly
	Cambodia	20 November 2016	3–2	(Myanmar) AFF Championship GS
	Vietnam	23 November 2016	0–1	(Myanmar) AFF Championship GS
	Myanmar	26 November 2016	0–1	(Myanmar) AFF Championship GS
	Philippines	22 March 2017	0–0	(Philippines) Friendly
	Lebanon	13 June 2017	1–2	(Malaysia) Asian Cup QR3
	Syria	22 August 2017	1–2	(Malaysia) Friendly
	Myanmar	29 August 2017	0–1	(Myanmar) Friendly
	Hong Kong	5 September 2017	1–1	(Malaysia) Asian Cup QR3
	Hong Kong	10 October 2017	0–2	(Hong Kong) Asian Cup QR3
	North Korea	10 November 2017	1–4	(Thailand) Asian Cup QR3
	Hong Kong	13 November 2017	1–4	(Thailand) Asian Cup QR3
	Mongolia	22 March 2018	2–2	(Malaysia) Friendly
	Lebanon	27 March 2018	1–2	(Lebanon) Asian Cup QR3
	Bhutan	1 April 2018	7–0	(Malaysia) Friendly
	Fiji	5 April 2018	1–0	(Malaysia) Friendly
	Chinese Taipei	7 September 2018	0–2	(Chinese Taipei) Friendly
	Cambodia	10 September 2018	3–1	(Cambodia) Friendly
	Sri Lanka	12 October 2018	4–1	(Sri Lanka) Friendly
	Kyrgyzstan	16 October 2018	0–1	(Malaysia) Friendly
	Maldives	3 November 2018	3–0	(Malaysia) Friendly
	Cambodia	8 November 2018	1–0	(Cambodia) AFF Championship GS
	Laos	12 November 2018	3–1	(Malaysia) AFF Championship GS
	Vietnam	16 November 2018	0–2	(Vietnam) AFF Championship GS
	Myanmar	24 November 2018	3–0	(Malaysia) AFF Championship GS
	Thailand	1 December 2018	0–0	(Malaysia) AFF Championship SF
	Thailand	5 December 2018	2–2	(Thailand) AFF Championship SF
	Vietnam	11 December 2018	2–2	(Malaysia) AFF Championship F
	Vietnam	15 December 2018	0–1	(Vietnam) AFF Championship F
	Singapore	20 March 2019	0–1	(Malaysia) Airmarine Cup
	Afghanistan	23 March 2019	2–1	(Malaysia) Airmarine Cup
	Nepal	2 June 2019	2–0	(Malaysia) Friendly
	Timor-Leste	7 June 2019	7–1	(Malaysia) World Cup QR1
	Timor-Leste	11 June 2019	5–1	(Malaysia) World Cup QR1
	Jordan	30 August 2019	0–1	(Malaysia) Friendly
	Indonesia	5 September 2019	3–2	(Indonesia) World Cup QR2
	United Arab Emirates	10 September 2019	0–1	(Malaysia) World Cup QR2
	Sri Lanka	5 October 2019	6–0	(Malaysia) Friendly
	Vietnam	10 September 2019	0–1	(Vietnam) World Cup QR2
	Tajikistan	9 November 2019	1–0	(Malaysia) World Cup QR2
	Thailand	14 November 2019	2–1	(Malaysia) World Cup QR2
	Indonesia	19 November 2019	2–0	(Malaysia) World Cup QR2

=== 2020–present results ===
2020–2029
Win Draw Defeat
M	Opponent	Date	Result	Event
	Bahrain	28 May 2021	0–2	(Bahrain) Friendly
	United Arab Emirates	3 June 2021	0–4	(United Arab Emirates) World Cup QR2
	Vietnam	11 June 2021	1–2	(United Arab Emirates) World Cup QR2
	Thailand	15 June 2021	1–0	(United Arab Emirates) World Cup QR2
	Jordan	6 October 2021	0–4	(Jordan) Friendly
	Uzbekistan	9 October 2021	1–5	(Jordan) Friendly
	Cambodia	6 December 2021	3–1	(Singapore) AFF Championship GS
	Laos	9 December 2021	4–0	(Singapore) AFF Championship GS
	Vietnam	12 December 2021	0–3	(Singapore) AFF Championship GS
	Indonesia	19 December 2021	1–4	(Singapore) AFF Championship GS
	Philippines	23 March 2022	2–0	(Singapore) FAS Tri-Nations Series
	Singapore	26 March 2022	1–2	(Singapore) FAS Tri-Nations Series
	Brunei	27 May 2022	4–0	(Malaysia) Friendly
	Hong Kong	1 June 2022	4–0	(Malaysia) Friendly
	Turkmenistan	8 June 2022	3–1	(Malaysia) AFC Asian Cup Q
	Bahrain	11 June 2022	1–2	(Malaysia) AFC Asian Cup Q
	Bangladesh	14 June 2022	4–1	(Malaysia) AFC Asian Cup Q
	Thailand	22 September 2022	1(5)–1(3)	(Thailand) King's Cup SF
	Tajikistan	25 September 2022	0(0)–0(3)	(Thailand) King's Cup F
	Cambodia	9 December 2022	4–0	(Malaysia) Friendly
	Maldives	14 December 2022	3–0	(Malaysia) Friendly
	Myanmar	21 December 2022	1–0	(Myanmar) AFF Championship GS
	Laos	23 December 2022	5–0	(Malaysia) AFF Championship GS
	Vietnam	27 December 2022	0–3	(Vietnam) AFF Championship GS
	Singapore	3 January 2023	4–1	(Malaysia) AFF Championship GS
	Thailand	7 January 2023	1–0	(Malaysia) AFF Championship SF
	Thailand	10 January 2023	0–3	(Thailand) AFF Championship SF
	Turkmenistan	23 March 2023	1–0	(Malaysia) Friendly
	Hong Kong	28 March 2023	2–0	(Malaysia) Friendly
	Solomon Islands	14 June 2023	4–1	(Malaysia) Friendly
	Papua New Guinea	20 June 2023	10–0	(Malaysia) Friendly
	Syria	6 September 2023	2–2	(China) Friendly
	China	9 September 2023	1–1	(China) Friendly
	India	13 October 2023	4–2	(Malaysia) Merdeka Tournament SF
	Tajikistan	17 October 2023	0–2	(Malaysia) Merdeka Tournament F
	Kyrgyzstan	16 November 2023	4–3	(Malaysia) World Cup QR2
	Chinese Taipei	21 November 2023	1–0	(Chinese Taipei) World Cup QR2
	Syria	8 January 2024	2–2	(Qatar) Friendly^{1}
	Jordan	15 January 2024	0–4	(Qatar) AFC Asian Cup GS
	Bahrain	20 January 2024	0–1	(Qatar) AFC Asian Cup GS
	South Korea	25 January 2024	3–3	(Qatar) AFC Asian Cup GS
	Oman	21 March 2024	0–2	(Oman) World Cup QR2
	Oman	26 March 2024	0–2	(Malaysia) World Cup QR2
	Kyrgyzstan	6 June 2024	1–1	(Kyrgyzstan) World Cup QR2
	Chinese Taipei	11 June 2024	3–1	(Malaysia) World Cup QR2
	Philippines	4 September 2024	2–1	(Malaysia) Merdeka Tournament SF
	Lebanon	8 September 2024	1–0	(Malaysia) Merdeka Tournament F
	New Zealand	14 October 2024	0–4	(New Zealand) Friendly
	Laos	14 November 2024	3–1	(Thailand) Friendly
	India	18 November 2024	1–1	(India) Friendly
	Cambodia	8 December 2024	2–2	(Cambodia) ASEAN Championship GS
	Timor-Leste	11 December 2024	3–2	(Malaysia) ASEAN Championship GS
	Thailand	14 December 2024	0–1	(Thailand) ASEAN Championship GS
	Singapore	20 December 2024	0–0	(Malaysia) ASEAN Championship GS
	Nepal	25 March 2025	0–3; Awarded (Note: On 26 September 2025, FIFA sanctioned the Football Association of Malaysia and seven players for using falsified eligibility documents. One player, Hector Hevel played in the match against Nepal. On 17 March 2026, the AFC overturned the game as a 3–0 victory for Nepal. The match originally ended in a 2–0 win for Malaysia.)	(Malaysia) 2027 Asian Cup QR3
	Cape Verde	29 May 2025	0–3; Awarded (Note: Due to the Malaysian football naturalisation scandal, the FIFA Disciplinary Committee awarded the match as a 3–0 win to Cape Verde on 17 December 2025 as Malaysia fielded the ineligible players Gabriel Palmero and Hector Hevel. The match originally ended in a 1-1 draw for both teams. The Football Association of Malaysia (FAM) were also fined CHF 10,000.)	(Malaysia) Friendly
	Vietnam	10 June 2025	0–3; Awarded (Note: On 26 September 2025, FIFA sanctioned the Football Association of Malaysia and seven players for using falsified eligibility documents. All seven players all played in the match against Vietnam. On 17 March 2026, the AFC overturned the game as a 3–0 victory for Vietnam. The match originally ended in a 4–0 win for Malaysia.)	(Malaysia) 2027 Asian Cup QR3
	Singapore	4 September 2025	0–3; Awarded (Note: Due to the Malaysian football naturalisation scandal, the FIFA Disciplinary Committee awarded the match as a 3–0 win to Singapore on 17 December 2025 as Malaysia fielded the ineligible players Gabriel Palmero, Facundo Garcés, Rodrigo Holgado, João Figueiredo and Jon Irazabal. The match originally ended in a 2–1 win for Malaysia. The Football Association of Malaysia (FAM) were also fined CHF 10,000.)	(Malaysia) Friendly
	Palestine	8 September 2025	0–3; Awarded (Note: Due to the Malaysian football naturalisation scandal, the FIFA Disciplinary Committee awarded the match as a 3–0 win to Palestine on 17 December 2025 as Malaysia fielded the ineligible players Rodrigo Holgado, João Figueiredo and Jon Irazabal. The match originally ended in a 1–0 win for Malaysia. The Football Association of Malaysia (FAM) were also fined CHF 10,000.)	(Malaysia) Friendly
	Laos	9 October 2025	3–0	(Laos) 2027 Asian Cup QR3
	Laos	14 October 2025	5–1	(Malaysia) 2027 Asian Cup QR3
	Nepal	18 November 2025	1–0	(Malaysia) 2027 Asian Cup QR3
	Vietnam	31 March 2026	1–3	(Vietnam) 2027 Asian Cup QR3
	Myanmar	25 July 2026	2–1	(Myanmar) 2026 ASEAN Championship GS
	Laos	28 July 2026	4–0	(Malaysia) 2026 ASEAN Championship GS
	Thailand	1 August 2026	0–2	(Thailand) 2026 ASEAN Championship GS
	Philippines	8 August 2026	1–0	(Malaysia) 2026 ASEAN Championship GS
	Vietnam	15 August 2026	0–2	(Malaysia) 2026 ASEAN Championship SF
	Vietnam	19 August 2026	0–2	(Vietnam) 2026 ASEAN Championship SF
	Bangladesh	25 September 2026	3–0	(Indonesia) 2026 FIFA ASEAN Cup GS
	Indonesia	28 September 2026	0–0	(Indonesia) 2026 FIFA ASEAN Cup GS
	Singapore	1 October 2026	6–0	(Indonesia) 2026 FIFA ASEAN Cup GS
	Vietnam	5 October 2026	1–0	(Indonesia) 2026 FIFA ASEAN Cup BF
	China	14 November 2026	0–2	(China) Friendly
	Yemen	17 November 2026	2–1	(China) Friendly

== See also ==
- Malaysia national football team honours
