= Azizol Abu Haniffah =

Malaysian footballer

Personal information
- Full name: Azizol Abu Haniffah
- Date of birth: 18 February 1965 (age 61)
- Place of birth: Teluk Intan, Perak, Malaysia
- Height: 1.70 m (5 ft 7 in)
- Position: Midfielder

Senior career*
Years	Team	Apps	(Gls)
1983–1994	Perak	30	(9)

International career
1983–1994	Malaysia	71	(8)

Managerial career
- Perodua FC
- * Club domestic league appearances and goals

Azizol Abu Haniffah is a former midfielder of Perak FA and Malaysia national team. Azizol, a player with high skills equals previous midfield legends such as Shukor Salleh and Wong Choon Wah. He also well known for having involved in 1994 Malaysian football scandal and severely punished, thus ending his football career aged 29.

== Career Overview ==
He start played for Perak FA since 1983. In the same year, Azizol made his international debut which ended in a 3–1 Won against Saudi Arabia in 1984 Summer Olympics – Asian qualification at the age of 18. In 1990, he captained Perak FA to win the inaugural competition of Malaysia FA Cup by beating Selangor FA 4–2. With the national team, he won the 1989 Southeast Asian Games gold medal and 1993 Merdeka Tournament. He played 71 times and scored 8 goals for the Malaysia national football team.

On 17 September 2014, FourFourTwo list him on their list of the top 25 Malaysian footballers of all time.

== Honours ==
=== Perak ===
- Liga Semi-Pro Divisyen 2 promotion: 1989
- Malaysia FA Cup: 1990; runner-up 1991

=== Malaysia ===
- Pestabola Merdeka: 1993
- SEA Games: 1989

=== Individual ===
- AFC Asian Team of the Year First XI: 1991
- Malaysian Player of The Year: 1991
