= Rosdi Talib =

Malaysian footballer

Personal information
- Full name: Rosdi Bin Talib
- Date of birth: 11 January 1976 (age 50)
- Place of birth: Kuala Terengganu, Malaysia
- Height: 1.70 m (5 ft 7 in)
- Positions: Left back; defensive midfielder

Youth career
- Terengganu FA President Cup

Senior career*
Years	Team	Apps	(Gls)
1997–2002	Terengganu	?	(?)
2003–2008	Pahang	?	(?)
2009–2012	T–Team	31	(3)
2013	Terengganu	5	(0)
2014	PBAPP	2	(0)
Total		?	(?)

International career
2000–2007	Malaysia	50	(6)

Managerial career
- 2013–2014: Hanelang (assistant coach)
- 2020–2023: Terengganu F.C. II (assistant coach)
- * Club domestic league appearances and goals

Rosdi Bin Talib (born 11 January 1976) is a Malaysian former international footballer. Rosdi plays mainly as a left-back but can also plays as a defensive midfielder.

== Club career ==
Rosdi started his career in the early 1990s at Terengganu youth team before being promoted to the first team. Playing for Terengganu he won the Malaysia FA Cup in 2000. In December 2000, he extents his contract with the club for another season. Rosdi played several seasons with his hometown side before left for Pahang in 2003.

After signed with Pahang in 2003, Rosdi won the 2004 Malaysia Super League championship and 2006 Malaysia FA Cup.

In 2009 he returned to his hometown and played for Kuala Terengganu based club PBDKT T-Team FC. After four years stint with PBDKT T-Team FC, Rosdi later signed with Terengganu in 2014. He later announced his retirement after his contract with Terengganu ends in 2014.

In April 2014, Rosdi came back from retirement to join Penang side PBAPP FC.

== International career ==
Rosdi has represented Malaysia national team since the 2000 AFC Asian Cup qualification. He helped Malaysia became the runners-up of the 2000 Merdeka Tournament and third-place finishers in the 2000 Tiger Cup. Rosdi has been appointed as the captain of the Malaysian national team in the 2004 Tiger Cup where Malaysia finished third. He was also selected to play for Malaysia in the 2007 AFC Asian Cup, playing the entire match. His last match for Malaysia was against Iran.

== Managerial career ==
In January 2014, Rosdi has been appointed as the assistant coach of third-tier club based in Terengganu Hanelang.

== Honours ==
Terengganu

- Malaysia Cup: 2001

Pahang

- Malaysia Super League: 2004

Malaysia

- Merdeka Tournament runner-up: 2000
- Tiger Cup third: 2000, 2004
