= 1982 President's Cup Football Tournament =

1982 President's Cup
Tournament details
- Host country: South Korea
- Dates: 5–18 June
- Teams: 10

Final positions
- Champions: South Korea (8th title) (Brazil) Operário-MS (1st title)
- Third place: (Netherlands) PSV Eindhoven
- Fourth place: (South Korea) Hallelujah FC

Tournament statistics
- Matches played: 24
- Goals scored: 69 (2.88 per match)
- Top scorer: (Netherlands) Ruud Geels (7 goals)

The 1982 President's Cup Football Tournament (Korean: 제12회 대통령배 국제축구대회) was the 12th competition of Korea Cup. The competition was held from 5 to 18 June 1982. South Korea and Operário played out a 0–0 draw and shared the trophy.

== Group stage ==
=== Group A ===
Team	Pld	W	D	L	GF	GA	GD	Pts	Qualification
(Netherlands) PSV Eindhoven	4	3	1	0	15	2	+13	7	Qualification to semi-finals
South Korea	4	3	0	1	7	2	+5	6	Qualification to semi-finals
Indonesia Garuda (Note: Can be considered as a national reserve team. (Indonesia B))	4	1	1	2	2	8	−6	3	
India	4	0	2	2	1	3	−2	2	
Bahrain	4	0	2	2	2	12	−10	2	

5 June 1982
15:30 KST

South Korea	0–2	(Netherlands) PSV Eindhoven
	Report; Newscast	Van de Kerkhof 43'; Wildschut 65'

Dongdaemun Stadium, Seoul

5 June 1982
17:15 KST

India	0–1	Indonesia Garuda
		Riyadi ?'

Dongdaemun Stadium, Seoul

7 June 1982
15:00 KST

South Korea	3–0	Indonesia Garuda
Park Sung-hwa 41'; Choi Soon-ho 44', 88'

Daegu Civic Stadium, Daegu

7 June 1982
16:45 KST

PSV Eindhoven (Netherlands)	8–1	Bahrain
Geels 11', 31', 44', 68'; Van de Kerkhof 36', 57'; Koolhof 53'; ? 67' (o.g.)		Ibrahim 61'

Daegu Civic Stadium, Daegu

9 June 1982
18:00 KST

Bahrain	1–1	Indonesia Garuda

Busan Gudeok Stadium, Busan

9 June 1982
19:45 KST

South Korea	1–0	India
Bhattacharya 65' (o.g.)	Report

Busan Gudeok Stadium, Busan

11 June 1982
15:00 KST

PSV Eindhoven (Netherlands)	1–1	India
Poortvliet 70'		Thapa 49'

Gwangju Mudeung Stadium, Gwangju

11 June 1982
16:45 KST

South Korea	3–0	Bahrain
Lee Tae-ho 27', 52' (pen.); Choi Soon-ho 54'

Gwangju Mudeung Stadium, Gwangju

13 June 1982
15:00 KST

India	0–0	Bahrain

Incheon Sungui Stadium, Incheon

13 June 1982
16:45 KST

PSV Eindhoven (Netherlands)	4–0	Indonesia Garuda

Incheon Sungui Stadium, Incheon

=== Group B ===
Team	Pld	W	D	L	GF	GA	GD	Pts	Qualification
(South Korea) Hallelujah FC	4	3	1	0	10	4	+6	7	Qualification to semi-finals
(Brazil) Operário-MS	4	3	1	0	9	4	+5	7	Qualification to semi-finals
Thailand	4	1	1	2	3	4	−1	3	
Malaysia	4	1	1	2	4	6	−2	3	
(West Germany) Bayer Leverkusen II	4	0	0	4	1	9	−8	0	

6 June 1982
15:00 KST

Bayer Leverkusen II (West Germany)	1–2	Malaysia
Popowitsch 43'		Johari 69', 76'

Dongdaemun Stadium, Seoul

6 June 1982
16:45 KST

Hallelujah FC (South Korea)	3–3	(Brazil) Operário-MS
Oh Seok-jae 68', 90+1'; Lee Young-gil 84'	Report	Arturzinho 3'; Luís Carlos 22'; Morais 31'

Dongdaemun Stadium, Seoul

8 June 1982
18:00 KST

Operário-MS (Brazil)	1–0	Thailand
Arturzinho 63'

Daegu Civic Stadium, Daegu

8 June 1982
19:45 KST

Hallelujah FC (South Korea)	1–0	Malaysia
Oh Seok-jae 15'

Daegu Civic Stadium, Daegu

10 June 1982
18:00 KST

Malaysia	1–1	Thailand
Anizan 16'	Report	Chalit 33'

Busan Gudeok Stadium, Busan

10 June 1982
19:45 KST

Hallelujah FC (South Korea)	4–0	(West Germany) Bayer Leverkusen II
Oh Seok-jae 1', 40'; Lee Gang-seok 17', 27'

Busan Gudeok Stadium, Busan

12 June 1982
15:00 KST

Operário-MS (Brazil)	2–0	(West Germany) Bayer Leverkusen II

Cheongju Sports Complex, Cheongju

12 June 1982
16:45 KST

Hallelujah FC (South Korea)	2–1	Thailand
Oh Pil-hwan 21'; Lee Jung-il 75'	Report	? 60'

Cheongju Sports Complex, Cheongju

14 June 1982
15:00 KST

Operário-MS (Brazil)	3–1	Malaysia

Incheon Sungui Stadium, Incheon

14 June 1982
16:45 KST

Thailand	1–0	(West Germany) Bayer Leverkusen II

Incheon Sungui Stadium, Incheon

== Knockout stage ==
=== Bracket ===
Semi-finals
16 June – Seoul
(Netherlands) PSV Eindhoven	3
(Brazil) Operário-MS	4
16 June – Seoul
(South Korea) Hallelujah FC	1
South Korea	2

Final
18 June – Seoul
(Brazil) Operário-MS (a.e.t.)	0
South Korea	0
Third place play-off
18 June – Seoul
(Netherlands) PSV Eindhoven	5
(South Korea) Hallelujah FC	0

=== Semi-finals ===
16 June 1982
17:00 KST

PSV Eindhoven (Netherlands)	3–4	(Brazil) Operário-MS
Van de Kerkhof 61', 74'; Geels 88'		Aluísio Santos 38'; Arturzinho 60', 67'; Luís Carlos 73'

Dongdaemun Stadium, Seoul

16 June 1982
17:45 KST

Hallelujah FC (South Korea)	1–2	South Korea
Oh Seok-jae 24'		Lee Kang-jo 18'; Lee Tae-ho 19'

Dongdaemun Stadium, Seoul

=== Third place play-off ===
18 June 1982
18:00 KST

PSV Eindhoven (Netherlands)	5–0	(South Korea) Hallelujah FC
Geels ?', ?'	Report

Dongdaemun Stadium, Seoul

=== Final ===
18 June 1982
19:45 KST

Operário-MS (Brazil)	0–0 (a.e.t.)	South Korea
	Newscast

Dongdaemun Stadium, Seoul

== See also ==
- Korea Cup
- South Korea national football team results
