= 2000 Merdeka Tournament =

2000 Pestabola Merdeka
Tournament details
- Host country: Malaysia
- Dates: 13–19 August
- Teams: 4
- Venue: 1 (in 1 host city)

Final positions
- Champions: New Zealand (1st title)
- Runners-up: Malaysia

Tournament statistics
- Matches played: 7
- Goals scored: 13 (1.86 per match)

The 2000 Merdeka Tournament was the 36th incidence of the Merdeka Tournament and was held 13 to 19 August 2000.

== Groups ==
=== Group stage ===
| Teams qualified for next phase |

Single Group Stage

| Team | Pts | Pld | W | D | L | GF | GA | GD |
|---|---|---|---|---|---|---|---|---|
| Malaysia | 7 | 3 | 2 | 1 | 0 | 5 | 1 | +4 |
| New Zealand | 7 | 3 | 2 | 1 | 0 | 4 | 0 | +4 |
| Oman | 3 | 3 | 1 | 0 | 2 | 1 | 3 | –2 |
| Malaysia U-22 | 0 | 3 | 0 | 0 | 3 | 1 | 7 | –6 |

13 August
18:30

| Malaysia U-22 | 0–1 | Oman |
|---|---|---|
| | | Hani Al-Dhabet 90' |

13 August
20:30

| New Zealand | 0–0 | Malaysia |

15 August
18:30

| New Zealand | 3–0 | Malaysia U-22 |
|---|---|---|
| Chris Killen 5', 23', 45' |

15 August
20:30

| Oman | 0–2 | Malaysia |
|---|---|---|
| | | Anuar Jusoh 53'; Rusdi Suparman 84' |

17 August
18:30

| Oman | 0–1 | New Zealand |
|---|---|---|
| | | Brad Scott 63' |

17 August
20:30

| Malaysia | 3–1 | Malaysia U-22 |
|---|---|---|
| S. Sivaram 16'; R. Suresh Kumar 65'; Ooi Hoe Guan 89' | | Leong Hong Seng 75' |

=== Finals ===
19 August
20:30

| Malaysia | 0–2 | New Zealand |
|---|---|---|
| | | Ryan Nelsen 14'; Paul Urlovic 37' |

== Award ==
2000 Merdeka Tournament winner

New Zealand
1st title
