= 1982 Merlion Cup =

Tournament details
- Host country: Singapore
- Dates: 5–17 October 1982
- Teams: 7 (from 2 confederations)
- Venue(s): 1 (in 1 host city)

Final positions
- Champions: Australia (1st title)
- Runners-up: South Korea
- Third place: Indonesia
- Fourth place: Malaysia

Tournament statistics
- Matches played: 13
- Goals scored: 40 (3.08 per match)

The 1982 Merlion Cup is the inaugural edition of the invitational football tournament. Matches were held at the former Singapore National Stadium held from 5–17 October 1982.

== Group stage ==
=== Group A ===
Pos	Team	Pld	W	D	L	GF	GA	GD	Pts	
1	South Korea	3	3	0	0	9	2	+7	6	Semifinal
2	Malaysia	3	2	0	1	6	3	+3	4	Semifinal
3	Singapore	3	1	0	2	7	3	+4	2	
4	Brunei	3	0	0	3	1	15	−14	0	

Updated to match(es) played on unknown. Source:
5 October 1982

Singapore	0–1	Malaysia
	Report

Singapore National Stadium
5 October 1982

South Korea	4–1	Brunei
	Report

Singapore National Stadium

7 October 1982

South Korea	3–1	Malaysia
	Report

Singapore National Stadium
7 October 1982

Singapore	7–0	Brunei
	Report

Singapore National Stadium

10 October 1982

Malaysia	4–0	Brunei
	Report

Singapore National Stadium
10 October 1982

Singapore	0–2	South Korea
	Report

Singapore National Stadium

=== Group B ===
Pos	Team	Pld	W	D	L	GF	GA	GD	Pts	
1	Australia	2	2	0	0	6	0	+6	4	Semifinal
2	Indonesia	2	0	1	1	0	2	−2	1	Semifinal
3	Thailand	2	0	1	1	0	4	−4	1	

Updated to match(es) played on unknown. Source:
6 October 1982

Thailand	0–4	Australia
	Report	O'Connor; Cole; Kosmina

Singapore National Stadium
Attendance: 3,000
Referee: N Chandra (Singapore)

9 October 1982

Indonesia	0–0	Thailand
	Report

Singapore National Stadium

11 October 1982

Indonesia	0–2	Australia
	Report	Mitchell 73', 77'

Singapore National Stadium
Attendance: 5,000
Referee: Lee Kok Leong (Singapore)

== Final round ==
=== Semifinals ===
13 October 1982

South Korea	1–0	Indonesia
	Report

Singapore National Stadium
14 October 1982

Australia	5–0	Malaysia
Katholos 19', 37'; Kosmina 56'; O'Connor 64'; Cole	Report

Singapore National Stadium
Attendance: 12,000

=== Third place play-off ===
17 October 1982

Indonesia	0–0 (a.e.t.)	Malaysia
	Report
Penalties
	4–3

Singapore National Stadium

=== Final ===
17 October 1982

Australia	3–2	South Korea
O'Connor 17'; Mitchell 34'; Christopoulos 61'	Report	Oh Suk-jae 59'; Park Chang-seun 83'

Singapore National Stadium
Attendance: 25,000
Referee: N Chandra (Singapore)

== Awards ==
1982 Merlion Cup champions

Australia
First title
