= Anuar Abu Bakar =

Malaysian footballer and manager (1971–2019)

Personal information
- Full name: Anuar bin Abu Bakar
- Date of birth: 28 April 1971
- Place of birth: Johor, Malaysia
- Date of death: 6 May 2019 (aged 48)
- Place of death: Shah Alam, Selangor, Malaysia
- Height: 1.72 m (5 ft 7 1/2 in)
- Positions: Striker; midfielder

Team information
- Current team: JDT U-15

Senior career*
Years	Team	Apps	(Gls)
1993–1997	Selangor		
1998–1999	Johor		
2000–2002	Kelantan		
2002	Penang		
2003	MPPJ Selangor		

International career^{‡}
1995–1996	Malaysia	9	(7)

Managerial career
- 2011–2014: PKNS (assistant coach)
- 2014: PKNS
- 2014: T-Team
- 2015: Selangor (assistant coach)
- 2017: UiTM U-21
- 2018: JDT U-15
- * Club domestic league appearances and goals as of 11 Nov 2018 ‡ National team caps and goals as of 6 December 2015

Anuar Abu Bakar (28 April 1971 – 6 May 2019) was a Malaysian footballer who was the head coach for UiTM FC (U-21). Anuar used to be an assistant coach at PKNS FC.

== Death ==
He died on 6 May 2019, aged 48, from liver cancer.
