= Salleh Ibrahim =

Malaysian footballer (1947–2020)

Personal information
- Full name: Salleh bin Ibrahim
- Date of birth: 15 October 1947
- Place of birth: Ketereh, Malayan Union
- Date of death: 8 March 2020 (aged 72)
- Place of death: Pengkalan Chepa, Kelantan, Malaysia
- Position: Striker

Senior career*
Years	Team	Apps	(Gls)
- Jabatan Penjara
1963–1964	Kelantan FA		
1965–1970	Singapore FA		
1971–1972	Kelantan FA		
1973–1980	Perak FA		

International career
1970–1978	Malaysia		
- * Club domestic league appearances and goals

Salleh Ibrahim (15 October 1947 – 8 March 2020) was a Malaysian footballer. A prison officer by profession (as Malaysian football was not professional in his time), Salleh represented Prison Department, Kelantan FA, Perak FA and Singapore FA during his football career. He also played for Malaysian national team, and competed in the men's tournament at the 1972 Summer Olympics, scoring in the 3–0 win against the United States in the group stage.

In 2004, he was inducted in Olympic Council of Malaysia's Hall of Fame for 1972 Summer Olympics football team.

== Honours ==
Singapore FA

- Malaysia Cup: 1965
