= 1993 Merdeka Tournament =

International football competition

The 1993 Merdeka Tournament was the 34th edition of the Merdeka Tournament and was held from February 5 to February 14, 1993, at Kuala Lumpur, Malaysia.

== Groups ==
=== Group stage ===
| Teams qualified for next phase |

=== Group A ===
| Team | Pts | Pld | W | D | L | GF | GA |
|---|---|---|---|---|---|---|---|
| (Bulgaria) CSKA Sofia | 5 | 3 | 2 | 1 | 0 | 3 | 0 |
| Malaysia | 4 | 3 | 1 | 2 | 0 | 3 | 2 |
| Thailand | 2 | 3 | 0 | 2 | 1 | 2 | 3 |
| Singapore | 1 | 3 | 0 | 1 | 2 | 2 | 5 |

5 February

| Malaysia | 2–1 | Singapore |
|---|---|---|
| Mubin Mokhtar 59'; Dollah Salleh 64' | | V. Sundramoorthy 41' |

Merdeka Stadium, Kuala Lumpur
Referee: Nizar Watty

5 February

| CSKA Sofia (Bulgaria) | 1–0 | Thailand |
|---|---|---|
| Bosidar Iskrenov 75' |

Merdeka Stadium, Kuala Lumpur
Referee: Nazri Abdullah

7 February

| Malaysia | 1–1 | Thailand |
|---|---|---|
| Dollah Salleh 44' | | Pichit Sanghua Chand 5' |

Merdeka Stadium, Kuala Lumpur
Referee: Ali Bujsaim

7 February

| CSKA Sofia (Bulgaria) | 2–0 | Singapore |
|---|---|---|
| Ivailo Andonov 6', 43' |

Merdeka Stadium, Kuala Lumpur
Referee: K Nadarajan

9 February

| Malaysia | 0–0 | (Bulgaria) CSKA Sofia |

Merdeka Stadium, Kuala Lumpur
Referee: Nizar Watty

9 February

| Thailand | 1–1 | Singapore |
|---|---|---|
| Prasong Pansawat 24' | | Fandi Ahmad 67' |

Merdeka Stadium, Kuala Lumpur
Referee: Nazri Abdullah

=== Group B ===
| Team | Pts | Pld | W | D | L | GF | GA |
|---|---|---|---|---|---|---|---|
| (Switzerland) FC Aarau | 5 | 3 | 2 | 1 | 0 | 8 | 2 |
| South Korea | 5 | 3 | 2 | 1 | 0 | 8 | 3 |
| Ghana | 2 | 3 | 1 | 0 | 2 | 3 | 4 |
| Indonesia | 0 | 3 | 0 | 0 | 3 | 0 | 10 |

6 February

| Ghana | 2–0 | Indonesia |
|---|---|---|
| Nana Frimpong 39', 83' |

Merdeka Stadium, Kuala Lumpur
Referee: Kikuchi Hideo

6 February

| FC Aarau (Switzerland) | 2–2 | South Korea |
|---|---|---|
| Petar Aleksandrov 20', 21' | | Lim Jae-sun 54'; Kwun Woo-jim 73' |

Merdeka Stadium, Kuala Lumpur
Referee: Nasaruddin Mohamed Sharrif

8 February

| South Korea | 3–0 | Indonesia |
|---|---|---|
| Roh Sang-rae 5'; Kwun Woo-jim 31'; Lim Jae-sun 76' |

Merdeka Stadium, Kuala Lumpur

8 February

| Ghana | 0–1 | (Switzerland) FC Aarau |
|---|---|---|
| | | Reto Rossi 82' |

Merdeka Stadium, Kuala Lumpur
Referee: Nasaruddin Mohamed Sharrif

10 February

| Ghana | 1–3 | South Korea |
|---|---|---|
| Ablade Kumah 14' | | Lim Jae-sum 15', 62'; Kwum Woo-jim 20' |

Merdeka Stadium, Kuala Lumpur
Referee: Ali Bujsaim

10 February

| FC Aarau (Switzerland) | 5–0 | Indonesia |
|---|---|---|
| Andreas Hasler 6'; Petar Aleksandrov 22' 40'; Romano Salvatore 57'; Uwe Wassimer 89' |

Merdeka Stadium, Kuala Lumpur
Referee: Kikuchi Hideo

== Knockout stage ==
Semi-finals
12 February
Malaysia | 2
(Switzerland) FC Aarau | 1
12 February
South Korea | 1
(Bulgaria) CSKA Sofia | 0

Final
14 February
Malaysia | 3
South Korea | 1

=== Semi finals ===
12 February

| Malaysia | 2–1 | (Switzerland) FC Aarau |
|---|---|---|
| Mubin Mokhtar 20'; Azman Adnan 59' | | Ryszard Komornicki 69' |

Merdeka Stadium, Kuala Lumpur
Referee: Ali Bujsaim

12 February

| South Korea | 1–0 | (Bulgaria) CSKA Sofia |
|---|---|---|
| Roh Sang-rae 80' |

Merdeka Stadium, Kuala Lumpur
Referee: Nasaruddin Mohamed Sharrif

=== Finals ===
14 February

| Malaysia | 3–1 | South Korea |
|---|---|---|
| Dollah Salleh 3'; Azman Adnan 95', 118' | | Roh Sang-rae 48' |

Merdeka Stadium, Kuala Lumpur
Referee: Nizar Watty

== Award ==
1993 Merdeka Tournament winner

Malaysia
10th title
