= Incheon Sungui Stadium =

1920–2008 stadium in South Korea

Coordinates: 37.465679°N 126.643420°E

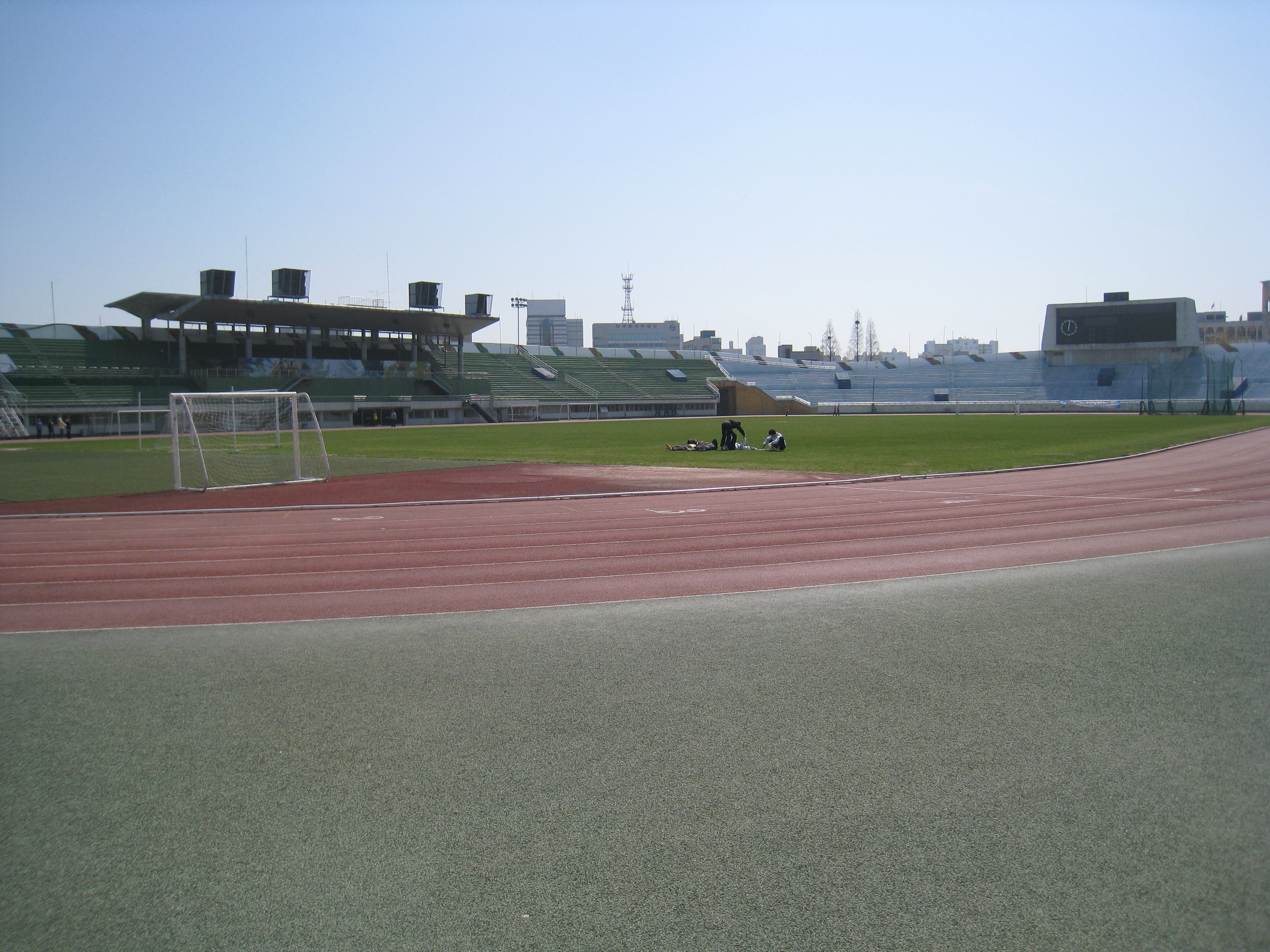
- Interactive map of Incheon Sungui Stadium
- Former names: Incheon Civic Stadium
- Location: Dowon-dong, Jung-gu, Incheon, South Korea
- Owner: City of Incheon
- Operator: City of Incheon
- Capacity: 25,000
- Surface: Natural grass

Construction
- Built: 1920
- Demolished: June 13, 2008

Tenant
- Yukong Elephants (1987–1990); Incheon Korail FC (2003–2007)

Incheon Sungui Stadium (Korean: 숭의종합경기장; Hanja: 崇義綜合競技場) was a multi-purpose stadium in Incheon, South Korea. It was formerly used mostly for football matches, and was the home of National League side Incheon Korail. The stadium had a capacity of 25,000. It was built in 1920 and was demolished on June 13, 2008 to make space for the Incheon Football Stadium.
