= Ooi Hoe Guan =

Malaysian footballer

Personal information
- Full name: Ooi Hoe Guan
- Date of birth: 31 December 1973 (age 52)
- Place of birth: Kedah, Malaysia
- Positions: Right winger; striker

Youth career
- 1992–1993: Kedah FA

Senior career*
Years	Team	Apps	(Gls)
1994–2002	Penang FA		
2003–2004	Kedah FA		
2005	Selangor MK Land		

International career^{‡}
2000	Malaysia	4	(1)
- * Club domestic league appearances and goals as of 24 May 2011 ‡ National team caps and goals as of 15 October 2011

Ooi Hoe Guan (born 31 December 1973) is a former Malaysian footballer. He also used to be a member of the Malaysia national football team.

Hoe Guan began his career with Kedah FA youth team. He transferred to Penang FA and started his senior debut in the Malaysia league, where he committed with Penang for more 7 seasons before returning to Kedah to become rotation squad player. After a couple of seasons with the hometown side, Guan called it quits and retired from football.

== International Senior Goals ==
#	Date	Venue	Opponent	Score	Result	Competition
1.	6 April 2000	Suphachalasai Stadium, Thailand	North Korea	1-4	Lost	2000 AFC Asian Cup qualification

== Honours ==
=== Penang FA ===
- Malaysia Premier 1 League: 1998, 2001
- Malaysia FA Cup: 2002
