= Malaysia at the 1979 SEA Games =

Malaysia at the 1979 Southeast Asian Games
- IOC code: MAS
- NOC: Olympic Council of Malaysia
- Website: www.olympic.org.my (in English)

in Jakarta
- Competitors: 260 in 18 sports
- Medals Ranked 5th: Gold 19 Silver 23 Bronze 39 Total 81

Southeast Asian Games appearances (overview)
- 1959; 1961; 1965; 1967; 1969; 1971; 1973; 1975; 1977; 1979; 1981; 1983; 1985; 1987; 1989; 1991; 1993; 1995; 1997; 1999; 2001; 2003; 2005; 2007; 2009; 2011; 2013; 2015; 2017; 2019; 2021; 2023; 2025; 2027; 2029

Malaysia competed in the 1979 Southeast Asian Games held in Jakarta, Indonesia from 21 to 30 September 1979.

== Medal summary ==
=== Medals by sport ===
| Sport | Gold | Silver | Bronze | Total | Rank |
|---|---|---|---|---|---|
| Archery | 0 | 0 | 1 | 1 | 5 |
| Athletics | 10 | 0 | 0 | 10 | |
| Badminton | 0 | 1 | 2 | 3 | 3 |
| Basketball | 1 | 1 | 0 | 2 | 1 |
| Football | 1 | 0 | 0 | 1 | 1 |
| Table tennis | 0 | 1 | 0 | 1 | 3 |
| Total | 19 | 23 | 39 | 81 | 5 |

=== Medallists ===
| Medal | Name | Sport | Event |
|---|---|---|---|
| Gold | Rabuan Pit | Athletics | Men's 400 metres |
| Gold | Ho Yoon Wah | Athletics | Men's high jump |
| Gold | Muthiah Dattaya | Athletics | Men's hammer throw |
| Gold | Ballang Lasung | Athletics | Men's javelin throw |
| Gold | Vellasamy Subramaniam | Athletics | Men's 10,000 metres track walk |
| Gold | Vellasamy Subramaniam | Athletics | Men's 20 kilometres road walk |
| Gold | Marina Chin Leng Sim | Athletics | Women's 100 metres hurdles |
| Gold | Gladys Chai Ng Mei | Athletics | Women's high jump |
| Gold | Paramasivam Sakthirani | Athletics | Women's 10,000 metres track walk |
| Gold | Marina Chin Leng Sim; V. Angamah; Zaiton Othman; Saik Oik Cum | Athletics | Women's 4 × 400 metres relay |
| Gold | Malaysia national basketball team | Basketball | Women's tournament |
| Gold | Malaysia national football team: Hamid Ramli; Jamal Nasir; D. Davendran; Soh Chin Aun; Santokh Singh; Shukor Salleh; Abdah Alif; Hassan Sani; James Wong; Mokhtar Dahari; Hassan Yahya; Abdullah Ramli; R. Arumugam; Wan Jamak Wan Hassan; G. Torayraju; Isa Bakar | Football | Men's tournament |
| Silver | Malaysia national badminton team | Badminton | Men's team |
| Silver | Malaysia national basketball team | Basketball | Men's tournament |
| Silver | Chong Suk Fong | Table tennis | Women's singles |
| Bronze | Suhaili Yusuf | Archery | Men's individual recurve 90 metre |
| Bronze | Misbun Sidek; Ong Beng Teong | Badminton | Men's doubles |
| Bronze | Malaysia national badminton team | Badminton | Women's team |

== Football ==
=== Men's tournament ===
Group stage

| Team | Pld | W | D | L | GF | GA | GD | Pts |
|---|---|---|---|---|---|---|---|---|
| Malaysia | 4 | 2 | 2 | 0 | 3 | 0 | +3 | 6 |
| Indonesia | 4 | 2 | 1 | 1 | 6 | 4 | +2 | 5 |
| Thailand | 4 | 2 | 1 | 1 | 6 | 4 | +2 | 5 |
| Singapore | 4 | 1 | 1 | 2 | 4 | 8 | −4 | 3 |
| Burma | 4 | 0 | 1 | 3 | 2 | 5 | −3 | 1 |

23 September 1979

| Singapore | 0 – 2 | Malaysia |
|---|---|---|
| | | James Wong 76'; Hassan Sani 84' |

Bung Karno Stadium, Jakarta

25 September 1979

| Malaysia | 0 – 0 | Burma |

Bung Karno Stadium, Jakarta

26 September 1979

| Indonesia | 0 – 0 | Malaysia |

Bung Karno Stadium, Jakarta

28 September 1979

| Malaysia | 1 – 0 | Thailand |

Bung Karno Stadium, Jakarta

Gold medal match

30 September 1979

| Indonesia | 0 – 1 | Malaysia |
|---|---|---|
| | | Mokhtar Dahari 21' |

Bung Karno Stadium, Jakarta
Attendance: 85.000
