= List of international goals scored by Mokhtar Dahari =

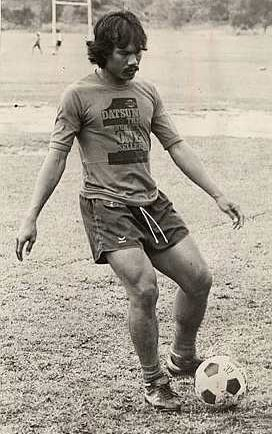
Dahari (pictured in the 1970s) scored 89 goals for Malaysia between 1972 and 1985

Mokhtar Dahari was a Malaysian footballer who represented the Malaysia national football team from 1972 to 1985. He scored 89 goals in 142 matches, making him the top men's international goalscorer of all time until he was surpassed by Iranian striker Ali Daei in June 2004.

== International goals ==
Scores and results list Malaysia's goal tally first, score column indicates score after each Mokhtar goal.

List of international goals scored by Mokhtar Dahari
No.	Date	Venue	Opponent	Score	Result	Competition	Ref.
1	5 June 1972	Jakarta, Indonesia	Sri Lanka	3–0	3–0	1972 Jakarta Anniversary Tournament	
2	9 June 1972	Jakarta, Indonesia	Laos	2–1	2–1	1972 Jakarta Anniversary Tournament	
3	15 June 1972	Jakarta, Indonesia	Burma	2–0	2–2	1972 Jakarta Anniversary Tournament	
4	19 July 1972	Perak Stadium, Ipoh, Malaysia	Khmer Republic	6–1	6–1	1972 Merdeka Tournament	
5	20 November 1972	Bangkok, Thailand	Thailand	2–0	2–0	1972 King's Cup	
6	28 November 1972	Bangkok, Thailand	Thailand	1–0	1–0	1972 King's Cup	
7	1 August 1973	Merdeka Stadium, Kuala Lumpur, Malaysia	Thailand	2–0	2–2	1973 Merdeka Tournament	
8	4 August 1973	Merdeka Stadium, Kuala Lumpur, Malaysia	India	4–0	4–0	1973 Merdeka Tournament	
9	12 August 1973	Merdeka Stadium, Kuala Lumpur, Malaysia	Kuwait	1–1	3–1	1973 Merdeka Tournament	
10	12 August 1973	Merdeka Stadium, Kuala Lumpur, Malaysia	Kuwait	3–1	3–1	1973 Merdeka Tournament	
11	7 September 1973	Kallang Stadium, Singapore	Singapore	2–0	3–0	1973 Southeast Asian Peninsular Games	
12	23 September 1973	Seoul, South Korea	Thailand	4–1	5–1	1973 President's Cup	
13	1 November 1973	Saigon, South Vietnam	South Vietnam	1	5–1	1973 South Vietnam Independence Cup	
14	1 November 1973	Saigon, South Vietnam	South Vietnam	2	5–1	1973 South Vietnam Independence Cup	
15	3 November 1973	Saigon, South Vietnam	Singapore	2–0	2–1	1973 South Vietnam Independence Cup	
16	20 December 1973	Bangkok, Thailand	Khmer Republic	1–0	3–2	1973 King's Cup	
17	20 December 1973	Bangkok, Thailand	Khmer Republic	2–1	3–2	1973 King's Cup	
18	20 December 1973	Bangkok, Thailand	Khmer Republic	3–2	3–2	1973 King's Cup	
19	23 December 1973	Bangkok, Thailand	Thailand	1–0	1–0	1973 King's Cup	
20	25 December 1973	Bangkok, Thailand	South Korea	1–2	1–2	1973 King's Cup	
21	7 June 1974	Jakarta, Indonesia	Indonesia	2–3	3–4	1974 Jakarta Anniversary Tournament	
22	7 June 1974	Jakarta, Indonesia	Indonesia	3–3	3–4	1974 Jakarta Anniversary Tournament	
23	27 July 1974	Perak Stadium, Ipoh, Malaysia	Hong Kong	1–0	1–0	1974 Merdeka Tournament	
24	1 August 1974	Perak Stadium, Ipoh, Malaysia	Thailand	1–0	1–0	1974 Merdeka Tournament	
25	7 September 1974	Tehran, Iran	Philippines	2–0	11–0	1974 Asian Games	
26	7 September 1974	Tehran, Iran	Philippines	3–0	11–0	1974 Asian Games	
27	7 September 1974	Tehran, Iran	Philippines	7–0	11–0	1974 Asian Games	
28	7 September 1974	Tehran, Iran	Philippines	9–0	11–0	1974 Asian Games	
29	7 September 1974	Tehran, Iran	Philippines	10–0	11–0	1974 Asian Games	
30	10 December 1974	Bangkok, Thailand	Thailand	2–0	2–0	1974 King's Cup	
31	20 December 1974	Bangkok, Thailand	Khmer Republic	2–0	3–0	1974 King's Cup	
32	20 December 1974	Bangkok, Thailand	Khmer Republic	3–0	3–0	1974 King's Cup	
33	16 March 1975	Bangkok, Thailand	South Korea	2–1	2–1	1976 AFC Asian Cup qualification	
34	16 June 1975	Jakarta, Indonesia	South Korea	1–1	1–1 (5–4 P.S.O)	1975 Jakarta Anniversary Tournament	
35	29 July 1975	Merdeka Stadium, Kuala Lumpur, Malaysia	South Korea	1–3	1–3	1975 Merdeka Tournament	
36	4 August 1975	Merdeka Stadium, Kuala Lumpur, Malaysia	Thailand	1–0	1–0	1975 Merdeka Tournament	
37	6 August 1975	Merdeka Stadium, Kuala Lumpur, Malaysia	Bangladesh	3–0	3–0	1975 Merdeka Tournament	
38	8 August 1975	Merdeka Stadium, Kuala Lumpur, Malaysia	Hong Kong	2–0	3–1	1975 Merdeka Tournament	
39	10 August 1975	Merdeka Stadium, Kuala Lumpur, Malaysia	Burma	2–1	2–1	1975 Merdeka Tournament	
40	9 December 1975	Bangkok, Thailand	Thailand	1–1	1–1 (3–4 P.S.O)	1975 Southeast Asian Peninsular Games	
41	13 December 1975	Bangkok, Thailand	Burma	1–0	1–0	1975 Southeast Asian Peninsular Games	
42	16 December 1975	Bangkok, Thailand	Thailand	1–2	1–2	1975 Southeast Asian Peninsular Games	
43	15 February 1976	Jakarta, Indonesia	Papua New Guinea	1–0	10–1	1976 Olympic Games qualification	
44	15 February 1976	Jakarta, Indonesia	Papua New Guinea	7–0	10–1	1976 Olympic Games qualification	
45	21 February 1976	Jakarta, Indonesia	Singapore	2–0	6–0	1976 Olympic Games qualification	
46	21 February 1976	Jakarta, Indonesia	Singapore	6–0	6–0	1976 Olympic Games qualification	
47	5 June 1976	Tabriz, Iran	China	1–0	1–1	1976 AFC Asian Cup	
48	7 August 1976	Merdeka Stadium, Kuala Lumpur, Malaysia	South Korea	1–0	2–1	1976 Merdeka Tournament	
49	12 August 1976	Merdeka Stadium, Kuala Lumpur, Malaysia	India	2–0	5–1	1976 Merdeka Tournament	
50	12 August 1976	Merdeka Stadium, Kuala Lumpur, Malaysia	India	3–0	5–1	1976 Merdeka Tournament	
51	14 August 1976	Merdeka Stadium, Kuala Lumpur, Malaysia	Indonesia	4–0	7–1	1976 Merdeka Tournament	
52	14 August 1976	Merdeka Stadium, Kuala Lumpur, Malaysia	Indonesia	5–0	7–1	1976 Merdeka Tournament	
53	17 August 1976	Merdeka Stadium, Kuala Lumpur, Malaysia	Burma	1–0	3–1	1976 Merdeka Tournament	
54	22 August 1976	Merdeka Stadium, Kuala Lumpur, Malaysia	Japan	1–0	2–0	1976 Merdeka Tournament	
55	22 August 1976	Merdeka Stadium, Kuala Lumpur, Malaysia	Japan	2–0	2–0	1976 Merdeka Tournament	
56	11 September 1976	Dongdaemun Stadium, Seoul, South Korea	South Korea	4–1	4–4	1976 President's Cup	
57	13 September 1976	Seoul, South Korea	Singapore	3–0	2–0	1976 President's Cup	
58	13 September 1976	Seoul, South Korea	Singapore	4–0	2–0	1976 President's Cup	
59	18 July 1977	Merdeka Stadium, Kuala Lumpur, Malaysia	Thailand	2–0	3–0	1977 Merdeka Tournament	
60	26 July 1977	Merdeka Stadium, Kuala Lumpur, Malaysia	South Korea	1–1	1–1	1977 Merdeka Tournament	
61	29 July 1977	Merdeka Stadium, Kuala Lumpur, Malaysia	Indonesia	1–1	5–1	1977 Merdeka Tournament	
62	21 November 1977	Merdeka Stadium, Kuala Lumpur, Malaysia	Philippines	2–0	5–0	1977 SEA Games	
63	21 November 1977	Merdeka Stadium, Kuala Lumpur, Malaysia	Philippines	4–0	5–0	1977 SEA Games	
64	23 November 1977	Merdeka Stadium, Kuala Lumpur, Malaysia	Brunei	3–0	7–0	1977 SEA Games	
65	25 November 1977	Merdeka Stadium, Kuala Lumpur, Malaysia	Burma	2–0	9–1	1977 SEA Games	
66	25 November 1977	Merdeka Stadium, Kuala Lumpur, Malaysia	Burma	3–0	9–1	1977 SEA Games	
67	25 November 1977	Merdeka Stadium, Kuala Lumpur, Malaysia	Burma	4–0	9–1	1977 SEA Games	
68	25 November 1977	Merdeka Stadium, Kuala Lumpur, Malaysia	Burma	7–1	9–1	1977 SEA Games	
69	25 November 1977	Merdeka Stadium, Kuala Lumpur, Malaysia	Burma	8–1	9–1	1977 SEA Games	
70	26 November 1977	Merdeka Stadium, Kuala Lumpur, Malaysia	Thailand	2–0	2–0	1977 SEA Games	
71	14 July 1978	Merdeka Stadium, Kuala Lumpur, Malaysia	Singapore	1–0	6–0	1978 Merdeka Tournament	
72	14 July 1978	Merdeka Stadium, Kuala Lumpur, Malaysia	Singapore	4–0	6–0	1978 Merdeka Tournament	
73	16 July 1978	Merdeka Stadium, Kuala Lumpur, Malaysia	Thailand	1–0	2–0	1978 Merdeka Tournament	
74	19 July 1978	Merdeka Stadium, Kuala Lumpur, Malaysia	Indonesia	1–0	1–0	1978 Merdeka Tournament	
75	2 May 1979	Bangkok, Thailand	Sri Lanka	1–0	3–1	1980 AFC Asian Cup qualification	
76	2 May 1979	Bangkok, Thailand	Sri Lanka	3–1	3–1	1980 AFC Asian Cup qualification	
77	5 May 1979	Bangkok, Thailand	Indonesia	4–1	4–1	1980 AFC Asian Cup qualification	
78	29 June 1979	Merdeka Stadium, Kuala Lumpur, Malaysia	Burma	1–0	4–1	1979 Merdeka Tournament	
79	29 June 1979	Merdeka Stadium, Kuala Lumpur, Malaysia	Burma	2–0	4–1	1979 Merdeka Tournament	
80	29 June 1979	Merdeka Stadium, Kuala Lumpur, Malaysia	Burma	3–0	4–1	1979 Merdeka Tournament	
81	23 September 1979	Senayan Stadium, Jakarta, Indonesia	Singapore	2–0	2–0	1979 SEA Games	
82	30 September 1979	Senayan Stadium, Jakarta, Indonesia	Indonesia	1–0	1–0	1979 SEA Games	
83	15 October 1980	Merdeka Stadium, Kuala Lumpur, Malaysia	Morocco	2–0	2–0	1980 Merdeka Tournament	
84	20 October 1980	Merdeka Stadium, Kuala Lumpur, Malaysia	Thailand	1–0	2–2	1980 Merdeka Tournament	
85	27 October 1980	Merdeka Stadium, Kuala Lumpur, Malaysia	Kuwait	1–1	2–1	1980 Merdeka Tournament	
86	30 October 1980	Merdeka Stadium, Kuala Lumpur, Malaysia	New Zealand	1–0	2–0	1980 Merdeka Tournament	
87	5 April 1981	Merdeka Stadium, Kuala Lumpur, Malaysia	Singapore	1–0	1–1	1981 Ovaltine Cup	
88	9 September 1981	Merdeka Stadium, Kuala Lumpur, Malaysia	Indonesia	1–0	2–0	1981 Merdeka Tournament	
89	15 September 1981	Merdeka Stadium, Kuala Lumpur, Malaysia	India	2–1	2–2	1981 Merdeka Tournament	

== Statistics ==
Goals by year
Year	Apps	Goals
1972	10	6
1973	21	14
1974	18	12
1975	16	10
1976	17	16
1977	11	12
1978	12	3
1979	14	6
1980	8	4
1981	14	3
1985	1	0
Total	142	89

== See also ==
- List of top international men's football goalscorers by country
- List of men's footballers with 50 or more international goals
