= Santokh Singh =

Retired Malaysian association football player

Datuk Santokh Singh PMW DSIS AMN
Personal information
- Full name: Santokh Singh s/o Gurdial Singh
- Date of birth: 22 June 1952 (age 74)
- Place of birth: Setapak, Selangor, British Malaya
- Position: Defender

Senior career*
Years	Team	Apps	(Gls)
1972–1985	Selangor		

International career
1973–1984	Malaysia	119	(7)
- * Club domestic league appearances and goals

Datuk Santokh Singh s/o Gurdial Singh PMW DSIS AMN (Punjabi: ਸੰਤੋਖ ਸਿੰਘ, romanized: Satōkha sigha; born 22 June 1952) is a retired Malaysian football player. His wife is Taljit Kaur and has 3 children, Kiranjeet Kaur, Sukhveer Singh and Rajveer Singh.

== Career Overview ==
Born in Setapak, Santokh played in the Selangor FA team from 1972 to 1985, winning 9 Malaysia Cups as captain of the team.

Santokh was a player for Malaysia national football team in the 1970s and 1980s, and played alongside the late Mokhtar Dahari, Soh Chin Aun and R. Arumugam. Santokh was part of Malaysia 1974 Asian Games bronze medalist in Tehran, but did not play in any of the matches due to injury before the start of the tournament. He won the Southeast Asian Games gold medal in 1977 and 1979. He also participated in the team that qualified to the 1980 Moscow Olympic Games, though he never featured in the finals of the tournament due to the Games' boycott by Malaysia.

His partnership with Soh Chin Aun was said to be the most solid defence in the much-feared Malaysian team. In February 1999, Asian Football Confederation recognize Santokh achievement of representing the country 145 times (match including Olympic qualification, against national 'B' football team, club side and selection side), 119 caps is against full national team. Thus, Asian Football Confederation include him into the AFC Century Club in 1999. In 2004, he was inducted in Olympic Council of Malaysia's Hall of Fame.

On 17 September 2014, FourFourTwo list him on their list of the top 25 Malaysian footballers of all time. In 2020, Goal.com had selected him on their list of The best Malaysia XI of all time.

== Accolades and legacy ==
In 2011, Santokh was bestowed the honour of the Panglima Mahkota Wilayah by the Yang Dipertuan Agong of Malaysia, which bears the title Datuk. during the occasion of Federal Territory Day. In the same year, the Sultan of Selangor also honoured him with the Order of Sultan Sharafuddin Idris Shah, carrying the title Dato'.

In 2016, he was the reference for one of the members of Team Malaysia in "Ola Bola".

== Career statistics ==
=== International ===
Scores and results list Malaysia's goal tally first, score column indicates score after each santokh goal.

List of international goals scored by Santokh Singh
No.	Date	Venue	Opponent	Score	Result	Competition	Ref.
1	29 July 1977	Kuala Lumpur, Malaysia	Indonesia	—	5-1	1977 Merdeka Tournament	
2	8 September 1977	Taegu, South Korea	Bahrain	—	3-1	1977 President's Cup Football Tournament	
3	23 November 1977	Kuala Lumpur, Malaysia	Brunei	—	7-0	1977 SEA Games	
4	9 May 1979	Bangkok, Thailand	North Korea	—	1-1	1980 AFC Asian Cup qualification	
5	5 June 1983	Singapore	Brunei	—	5-0	1983 SEA Games	
6	22 October 1983	Singapore	India	—	3-3	1984 Summer Olympics - Asian Qualifiers	
7	22 October 1983	Singapore	India	—	3-3	1984 Summer Olympics - Asian Qualifiers	

== Honours ==
=== Orders ===
- Malaysia
  - Member of the Order of the Defender of the Realm (AMN) (1980)
- Federal Territory (Malaysia)
  - Commander of the Order of the Territorial Crown (PMW) – Datuk (2011)
- Selangor
  - Knight Companion of the Order of Sultan Sharafuddin Idris Shah (DSIS) – Dato' (2011)

== See also ==
- List of men's footballers with 100 or more international caps
- List of Sikh footballers
