= Jamal Nasir =

Malaysian footballer

Personal information
- Full name: Jamal Nasir Bin Abdul Ismail
- Date of birth: 12 September 1954 (age 72)
- Place of birth: Kemaman, Terengganu
- Position: Right back

Senior career*
Years	Team	Apps	(Gls)
1970–1984	Pahang		

International career
1975–1984	Malaysia	88	(2)
- * Club domestic league appearances and goals

Jamal Nasir is a former Malaysian footballer who plays for Pahang and Malaysia national team as a right back in the 1970s and in the 1980s. He also a football critic.

== International career ==
Jamal Nasir represented Malaysia from 1975 to 1984. He was also a part of the Malaysian player in qualified to the 1980 Olympic games Moscow which Malaysia boycotted. Malaysia won the play-off against South Korea with a 2–1 score in the Merdeka Stadium. In February 1999, Asian Football Confederation recognize Jamal Nasir achievement of representing the country 111 times (match including Olympic qualification, against national 'B' football team, club side and selection side), 88 caps is against full national team. Thus, Asian Football Confederation include him into the AFC Century Club in 1999.

== Honours ==
=== Club ===
Pahang

- Malaysia Cup

Winners: 1983

=== International ===
- SEA Games

Winners: 1977, 1979

- Pestabola Merdeka

Winners: 1979

=== Individual ===
- AFC Century Club 1999
- Goal.com The best Malaysia XI of all time: 2020
- IFFHS Men's All Time Malaysia Dream Team: 2022
