= 1976 President Park's Cup Football Tournament =

1976 President Park's Cup
Tournament details
- Host country: South Korea
- Dates: 11–25 May
- Teams: 10

Final positions
- Champions: South Korea (4th title) (Brazil) Paulista U21 (1st title)
- Third place: South Korea B
- Fourth place: New Zealand

Tournament statistics
- Matches played: 24
- Goals scored: 65 (2.71 per match)
- Top scorer: (South Korea) Cha Bum-kun (7 goals)

The 1976 President Park's Cup Football Tournament (Korean: 제6회 박대통령컵 쟁탈 국제축구대회) was the sixth competition of Korea Cup. It was held from 11 to 22 May 1976, and the opening ceremony was held at the Dongdaemun Stadium. South Korea and Paulista under-21 (São Paulo state) played out a 0–0 draw and shared the trophy.

== Group stage ==
=== Group A ===
Team	Pld	W	D	L	GF	GA	GD	Pts	Qualification
(Brazil) Paulista U21	4	3	1	0	9	1	+8	7	Qualification to semi-finals
South Korea	4	2	2	0	16	5	+11	6	Qualification to semi-finals
Malaysia	4	2	1	1	12	7	+5	5	
Singapore	4	1	0	3	3	16	−13	2	
India	4	0	0	4	1	12	−11	0	

11 September 1976
15:30 UTC+9

South Korea	4–4	Malaysia
Park Sang-in 69'; Cha Bum-kun 83', 87', 89'	Report; Newscast	Wan 12'; Isa 21'; Kim Chul-soo 32' (o.g.); Mokhtar 79'

Dongdaemun Stadium, Seoul
Attendance: 30,000

13 September 1976
17:30 UTC+9

Malaysia	4–1	Singapore
Isa 14'; Shukor 17'; Mokhtar 55', 65'	Report	Ho 66'

Dongdaemun Stadium, Seoul

13 September 1976
19:10 UTC+9

South Korea	4–0	India
Lee Young-moo 40', 53'; Cho Dong-hyun 42'; Cha Bum-kun 58'	Report

Dongdaemun Stadium, Seoul
Attendance: 12,000

15 September 1976
17:30 UTC+9

India	1–2	Singapore
Devaraju 71'	Report 1 Report 2	Quah 29', 66'

Dongdaemun Stadium, Seoul

15 September 1976
19:10 UTC+9

Paulista U21 (Brazil)	2–0	Malaysia
Tatinho 19'; Wilson Luiz 79'	Report

Dongdaemun Stadium, Seoul

17 September 1976
17:30 UTC+9

Paulista U21 (Brazil)	2–0	India
Tatinho 13'; ? (?)	Report

Dongdaemun Stadium, Seoul

17 September 1976
19:10 UTC+9

South Korea	7–0	Singapore
Cha Bum-kun 3', 85'; Kim Kang-nam 27'; Lee Young-moo 29'; Kim Jin-kook 36', 37'; Park Sang-in 76'	Report

Dongdaemun Stadium, Seoul
Attendance: 12,000

19 September 1976
14:00 UTC+9

Malaysia	4–0	India
Alif 42'; Bakar 83'; W. Aziz 87'; W. Rashid 89'	Report

Dongdaemun Stadium, Seoul

19 September 1976
15:40 UTC+9

South Korea	1–1	(Brazil) Paulista U21
Cha Bum-kun 87'	Report	Wilson Luis 22'

Dongdaemun Stadium, Seoul

21 September 1976
15:00 UTC+9

Paulista U21 (Brazil)	4–0	Singapore
Nascimento 12'; Gatãozinho 14'; Tatinho 67'; Carlos Roberto 85'	Report

Dongdaemun Stadium, Seoul

=== Group B ===
Team	Pld	W	D	L	GF	GA	GD	Pts	Qualification
New Zealand	4	3	1	0	6	1	+5	7	Qualification to semi-finals
South Korea B	4	2	1	1	4	2	+2	5	Qualification to semi-finals
Burma	4	2	0	2	4	3	+1	4	
Thailand	4	0	2	2	3	7	−4	2	
(Indonesia) Warna Agung	4	0	2	2	1	5	−4	2	

12 September 1976
14:00 UTC+9

New Zealand	2–0	Burma

Dongdaemun Stadium, Seoul

12 September 1976
15:40 UTC+9

South Korea B	2–0	(Indonesia) Warna Agung
Park Chang-sun 35'; Shin Hyun-ho 62'	Report

Dongdaemun Stadium, Seoul

14 September 1976
17:30 UTC+9

Burma	2–0	(Indonesia) Warna Agung
Win Sein 45'; Kyi Lin 72'	Report

Dongdaemun Stadium, Seoul

14 September 1976
19:10 UTC+9

South Korea B	1–1	Thailand
Park Chang-sun 90'	Report	Niwat 52'

Dongdaemun Stadium, Seoul

16 September 1976
17:30 UTC+9

New Zealand	0–0	(Indonesia) Warna Agung

Dongdaemun Stadium, Seoul

16 September 1976
19:10 UTC+9

Burma	2–0	Thailand
Kyi Lin 58'; Mya Kyiang 70'	Report

Dongdaemun Stadium, Seoul

18 September 1976
14:00 UTC+9

New Zealand	3–1	Thailand
Taylor 35'; Turner (?); ? (?)	Report	Taylor 52' (o.g.)

Dongdaemun Stadium, Seoul

18 September 1976
15:40 UTC+9

South Korea B	1–0	Burma
Yoo Dong-chun 20'	Report

Dongdaemun Stadium, Seoul

20 September 1976
19:00 UTC+9

Thailand	1–1	(Indonesia) Warna Agung
? 81'	Report	Pattinasarany 56' (pen.)

Dongdaemun Stadium, Seoul

21 September 1976
19:00 UTC+9

South Korea B	0–1	New Zealand
	Report	Mulgrew 30'

Dongdaemun Stadium, Seoul

== Knockout stage ==
=== Bracket ===
Semi-finals
23 September – Seoul
(Brazil) Paulista U21	3
South Korea B	0
23 September – Seoul
New Zealand	0
South Korea	2

Final
25 September – Seoul
(Brazil) Paulista U21 (a.e.t.)	0
South Korea	0
Third place play-off
25 September – Seoul
South Korea B	1
New Zealand	0

=== Semi-finals ===
23 September 1976
17:00 UTC+9

Paulista U21 (Brazil)	3–0	South Korea B
Titica 50', 72'; W. Carrasco 89'	Report

Dongdaemun Stadium, Seoul

23 September 1976
18:40 UTC+9

New Zealand	0–2	South Korea
	Report	Kim Jin-kook 21'; Park Sang-in 39'

Dongdaemun Stadium, Seoul
Attendance: 30,000

=== Third place play-off ===
25 September 1976
14:00 UTC+9

South Korea B	1–0	New Zealand
Huh Jung-moo 79'	Report

Dongdaemun Stadium, Seoul

=== Final ===
25 September 1976
15:40 UTC+9

South Korea	0–0 (a.e.t.)	(Brazil) Paulista U21

Dongdaemun Stadium, Seoul

== See also ==
- Korea Cup
- South Korea national football team results
