= 1980 AFC Asian Cup qualification =

Tournament details
- Dates: 25 December 1978 – 14 May 1979
- Teams: 17 (from 1 confederation)

Tournament statistics
- Matches played: 31
- Goals scored: 91 (2.94 per match)

The qualification for the 1980 AFC Asian Cup consisted of 18 teams in four groups. Eight teams from the top two of each group advance to the final tournament, joining hosts Kuwait and defending champions Iran.

== Groups ==
| Group 1 | Group 2 | Group 3 | Group 4 |
|---|---|---|---|
| Bahrain; Lebanon; ~~Pakistan~~*; ~~South Yemen~~*; Syria; United Arab Emirates | Afghanistan; Bangladesh; ~~India~~*; ~~Iraq~~*; ~~Jordan~~*; ~~Nepal~~*; Qatar; ~~Saudi Arabia~~* | ~~Brunei~~*; ~~Burma~~*; Hong Kong; Indonesia; Malaysia; North Korea; Singapore; Sri Lanka; Thailand | China; ~~Kampuchea~~*; ~~Japan~~*; ~~Laos~~*; Macau; Philippines; South Korea; ~~Vietnam~~* |

- * Withdrew
- Iran qualified as defending champions
- Kuwait qualified as hosts

== Qualification ==
=== Group 1 ===
| Pos | Team | Pld | W | D | L | GF | GA | GD | Pts | Qualification |
|---|---|---|---|---|---|---|---|---|---|---|
| 1 | Syria | 2 | 1 | 1 | 0 | 1 | 0 | +1 | 3 | 1980 AFC Asian Cup |
| 2 | United Arab Emirates | 2 | 0 | 2 | 0 | 0 | 0 | 0 | 2 | 1980 AFC Asian Cup |
| 3 | Lebanon | 2 | 0 | 1 | 1 | 0 | 1 | −1 | 1 | |
| 4 | Bahrain | 0 | 0 | 0 | 0 | 0 | 0 | 0 | 0 | Withdrew (Note: In the 17 November match between Syria and Bahrain, the referee awarded a penalty to Bahrain. The Syrian head coach entered the pitch, threatening the referee, who stopped the match in the 75th minute. The play then restarted for another three minutes before entirely stopping due to more fighting. The committee initially awarded the match 3–0 in favour of Bahrain, but Syria threatened to withdraw; the committee adjusted its decision to a replay of the match on 25 November, but then Bahrain withdrew. All matches involving Bahrain were annulled.) |

All matches played in the United Arab Emirates.

16 November 1979

| United Arab Emirates | 0–0 | Lebanon |

Mohammed bin Zayed Stadium, Abu Dhabi
Referee: Muhib Al Jaid (Saudi Arabia)
17 November 1979

| Syria | 1–1 Cancelled | Bahrain |
|---|---|---|
| Mardikian 10' | | Zuweid 72' (pen.) |

Mohammed bin Zayed Stadium, Abu Dhabi

20 November 1979

| United Arab Emirates | 0–0 | Syria |

Mohammed bin Zayed Stadium, Abu Dhabi
20 November 1979

| Lebanon | Cancelled | Bahrain |

Mohammed bin Zayed Stadium, Abu Dhabi

22 November 1979

| Syria | 1–0 | Lebanon |
|---|---|---|
| Qaddour 21' | | Saleh (red card) 60'; Abboud (red card) 63'; E. Rustom (red card) 70' |

Mohammed bin Zayed Stadium, Abu Dhabi
Referee: Abdulwahab Binai (Kuwait)
23 November 1979

| United Arab Emirates | Cancelled | Bahrain |

Mohammed bin Zayed Stadium, Abu Dhabi

=== Group 2 ===
| Pos | Team | Pld | W | D | L | GF | GA | GD | Pts | Qualification |
|---|---|---|---|---|---|---|---|---|---|---|
| 1 | Qatar | 4 | 3 | 1 | 0 | 10 | 2 | +8 | 7 | 1980 AFC Asian Cup |
| 2 | Bangladesh | 4 | 1 | 2 | 1 | 7 | 8 | −1 | 4 | 1980 AFC Asian Cup |
| 3 | Afghanistan | 4 | 0 | 1 | 3 | 4 | 11 | −7 | 1 | |

Source: RSSSF

All matches played in Bangladesh.

Iraq were originally drawn in this group but they withdrew before the start of the qualifiers.

1 March 1979

| Bangladesh | 2–2 | Afghanistan |
|---|---|---|
| Halim 34', 48' | | Safdari 11'; Hashimi 25' |

Dhaka Stadium, Dhaka
Referee: Mubarak Waleed Saeed (Qatar)

2 March 1979

| Qatar | 3–0 | Afghanistan |
|---|---|---|
| Mattar 20'; Bashir (?); Muftah 90' |

Dhaka Stadium, Dhaka
Referee: Munir Hossein (Bangladesh)

3 March 1979

| Bangladesh | 1–1 | Qatar |
|---|---|---|
| Mohsin 23' | | Muftah 58' |

Dhaka Stadium, Dhaka
Referee: Sultan Najand (Afghanistan)

5 March 1979

| Bangladesh | 3–2 | Afghanistan |
|---|---|---|
| Chunnu 50'; Halim 53'; Salahuddin 90' | Report | Kargar 5'; Rohparwar 61' |

Dhaka Stadium, Dhaka
Referee: Mubarak Waleed Saeed (Qatar)

6 March 1979

| Qatar | 3–0 | Afghanistan |
|---|---|---|
| Mattar 49', 61'; Muftah (?) |

Dhaka Stadium, Dhaka
Referee: Dalil Khan (Bangladesh)

7 March 1979

| Bangladesh | 1–3 | Qatar |
|---|---|---|
| Salahuddin 44' | | Muftah 11', 51'; Mattar 21'; Ghanim (red card) 78' |

Dhaka Stadium, Dhaka
Referee: Sultan Najand (Afghanistan)

=== Group 3 ===
All matches played in Thailand.

Group allocation matches where winners were divided into separate groups. Singapore received a bye and was automatically allocated into Group 3B.

1 May 1979

| Thailand | 3–1 | Indonesia |
|---|---|---|
| Dara 12'; Laohakul 24'; Ratanatisoi 35' | | Kapissa 18' |

National Stadium, Bangkok

2 May 1979

| Malaysia | 3–1 | Sri Lanka |
|---|---|---|
| Dahari 20', 75'; Wong 25' | | Sumathipala 65' |

National Stadium, Bangkok

2 May 1979

| North Korea | 3–0 | Hong Kong |
|---|---|---|
| An Se-uk 43'; Pak Jong-hun (?); Kim Mun-chol 57' |

National Stadium, Bangkok

==== Group 3A ====
| Pos | Team | Pld | W | D | L | GF | GA | GD | Pts | Qualification |
|---|---|---|---|---|---|---|---|---|---|---|
| 1 | Malaysia | 2 | 1 | 1 | 0 | 5 | 2 | +3 | 3 | Advance to semi-finals |
| 2 | North Korea | 2 | 1 | 1 | 0 | 4 | 2 | +2 | 3 | Advance to semi-finals |
| 3 | Indonesia | 2 | 0 | 0 | 2 | 2 | 7 | −5 | 0 | |

5 May 1979

| Malaysia | 4–1 | Indonesia |
|---|---|---|
| Singh 35'; Wong 51'; Ibni 55'; Dahari 88' | | Idris 71' |

National Stadium, Bangkok

7 May 1979

| North Korea | 3–1 | Indonesia |
|---|---|---|
| Pak Jong-hun 22', 75'; Hong Song-nam 32' | | Lala 35' |

National Stadium, Bangkok

9 May 1979

| Malaysia | 1–1 | North Korea |
|---|---|---|
| Soh Chin Aun 60' | | Pak Jong-hun 25' |

National Stadium, Bangkok

==== Group 3B ====
| Pos | Team | Pld | W | D | L | GF | GA | GD | Pts | Qualification |
|---|---|---|---|---|---|---|---|---|---|---|
| 1 | Thailand | 3 | 3 | 0 | 0 | 9 | 0 | +9 | 6 | Advance to semi-finals |
| 2 | Hong Kong | 3 | 2 | 0 | 1 | 8 | 2 | +6 | 4 | Advance to semi-finals |
| 3 | Sri Lanka | 3 | 1 | 0 | 2 | 4 | 9 | −5 | 2 | |
| 4 | Singapore | 3 | 0 | 0 | 3 | 1 | 11 | −10 | 0 | |

4 May 1979

| Hong Kong | 3–1 | Singapore |
|---|---|---|
| Chung Chor Wai 21', 65', 85' | Report | Wong Kok Choy 19' |

National Stadium, Bangkok
4 May 1979

| Thailand | 4–0 | Sri Lanka |

National Stadium, Bangkok

6 May 1979

| Hong Kong | 5–0 | Sri Lanka |
|---|---|---|
| Chung Chor Wai (?), 50'; Lau Wing Yip 23', 27'; Currie 75' | Report |

National Stadium, Bangkok
6 May 1979

| Thailand | 4–0 | Singapore |
|---|---|---|
| Laohakul 9', 52', 61'; Naphatalung 43' | Report |

National Stadium, Bangkok
Attendance: 15,000

8 May 1979

| Sri Lanka | 4–0 | Singapore |
|---|---|---|
| Zaheer 20', 35' (?); Fernando (?) | Report |

National Stadium, Bangkok
8 May 1979

| Thailand | 1–0 | Hong Kong |

National Stadium, Bangkok

==== Semi-finals ====
11 May 1979

| Malaysia | 0–0 | Hong Kong |
Penalties
| Dahari (penalty scored); Singh (penalty scored); Ibni (penalty scored); Wong (penalty scored); Soh Chin Aun (penalty scored) | 5–4 | Anderson (penalty scored); Leung Nang Yan (penalty scored); Chan Fat Chi (penalty scored); Wu Kwok Hung (penalty scored); Kwok Ka Ming (penalty missed) |

National Stadium, Bangkok

12 May 1979

| Thailand | 0–1 | North Korea |
|---|---|---|
| | | An Chang-nam 48' |

National Stadium, Bangkok
Referee: Soetoyo Hartasardjono (Indonesia)

==== Third place play-off ====
14 May 1979

| Thailand | 1–2 | Hong Kong |

National Stadium, Bangkok

==== Final ====
14 May 1979

| North Korea | 1–0 | Malaysia |
|---|---|---|
| Hong Song-nam 80' |

National Stadium, Bangkok

North Korea and Malaysia qualified for the final tournament.

=== Group 4 ===
| Pos | Team | Pld | W | D | L | GF | GA | GD | Pts | Qualification |
|---|---|---|---|---|---|---|---|---|---|---|
| 1 | South Korea | 3 | 3 | 0 | 0 | 10 | 1 | +9 | 6 | 1980 AFC Asian Cup |
| 2 | China | 3 | 2 | 0 | 1 | 5 | 2 | +3 | 4 | 1980 AFC Asian Cup |
| 3 | Macau | 3 | 1 | 0 | 2 | 4 | 7 | −3 | 2 | |
| 4 | Philippines | 3 | 0 | 0 | 3 | 1 | 10 | −9 | 0 | |

All matches played in the Philippines.

23 December 1978

| Philippines | 1–2 | Macau |
|---|---|---|
| Ferraren 28' | | Lei Chong Mao 45'; Jesus 55' |

Rizal Memorial Stadium, Manila

25 December 1978

| South Korea | 4–1 | Macau |
|---|---|---|
| Huh Jung-moo 34'; Lee Young-moo 35', 44', 82' | | Kao Chi Fat 83' |

Rizal Memorial Stadium, Manila
25 December 1978

| Philippines | 0–3 | China |
|---|---|---|
| | | Shen Xiangfu 10'; Li Fubao 16'; Lin Luosheng (?) |

Rizal Memorial Stadium, Manila

27 December 1978

| Philippines | 0–5 | South Korea |
|---|---|---|
| | | Park Sang-in 30'; Kim Jae-han 43'; Park Sung-hwa 52'; Shin Hyun-ho 65'; Lee Kang-jo 75' |

Rizal Memorial Stadium, Manila
27 December 1978

| China | 2–1 | Macau |
|---|---|---|
| Wang Feng 15'; Li Fubao 52' | | Fong Hong Hun 45' |

Rizal Memorial Stadium, Manila

29 December 1978

| South Korea | 1–0 | China |
|---|---|---|
| Huh Jung-moo 13' |

Rizal Memorial Stadium, Manila

== Qualified teams ==
| Team | Qualified as | Qualified on | Previous appearance |
|---|---|---|---|
| Kuwait | Hosts | N/A | 2 (1972, 1976) |
| Iran | 1976 AFC Asian Cup champions | 13 June 1976 | 3 (1968, 1972, 1976) |
| Syria | Group 1 winners | 22 November 1979 | 0 (debut) |
| United Arab Emirates | Group 1 runners-up | 23 November 1979 | 0 (debut) |
| Qatar | Group 2 winners | 15 January 1979 | 0 (debut) |
| Bangladesh | Group 2 runners-up | 16 January 1979 | 0 (debut) |
| North Korea | Group 3 winners | 12 May 1979 | 0 (debut) |
| Malaysia | Group 3 runners-up | 11 May 1979 | 1 (1976) |
| South Korea | Group 4 winners | 29 December 1978 | 4 (1956, 1960, 1964, 1972) |
| China | Group 4 runners-up | 29 December 1978 | 1 (1976) |

== Controversies ==
In the 17 November match between Syria and Bahrain, the referee awarded a penalty to Bahrain. The Syrian head coach entered the pitch, threatening the referee, who stopped the match in the 75th minute. The play then restarted for another three minutes before entirely stopping due to more fighting. The committee initially awarded the match 3–0 in favour of Bahrain, but Syria threatened to withdraw; the committee adjusted its decision to a replay of the match on 25 November, but then Bahrain withdrew. All matches involving Bahrain were annulled.

== Goalscorers ==
There were 91 goals scored in 31 matches, for an average of 2.94 goals per match.

5 goals

- (Hong Kong) Chung Chor Wai
- (Qatar) Mansour Muftah

4 goals

- (North Korea) Pak Jong-hun
- (Qatar) Hassan Matar
- (Thailand) Witthaya Laohakul

3 goals

- (Bangladesh) Mohammad Abdul Halim
- (Malaysia) Mokhtar Dahari
- (South Korea) Lee Young-moo
- (Sri Lanka) Mohamed Zaheer

2 goals

- (Bangladesh) Kazi Salahuddin
- (China) Li Fubao
- (Hong Kong) Lau Wing Yip
- (Malaysia) James Wong
- (North Korea) Hong Song-nam
- (South Korea) Huh Jung-moo

1 goal

- (Afghanistan) Mohammad Ibrahim Hashimi
- (Afghanistan) Mohammad Saber Rohparwar
- (Afghanistan) Mohammad Yasin Safdari
- (Afghanistan) Najibullah Kargar
- (Bangladesh) Ashraf Uddin Ahmed Chunnu
- (Bangladesh) Mohammed Mohsin
- (China) Lin Luosheng
- (China) Shen Xiangfu
- (China) Wang Feng
- (Hong Kong) Derrek Currie
- (Indonesia) Andi Lala
- (Indonesia) Iswadi Idris
- (Indonesia) Timo Kapissa
- (Macau) Eduardo Jesus
- (Macau) Fong Hong Hun
- (Macau) Kao Chi Fat
- (Macau) Lei Chong Mao
- (Malaysia) Bakri Ibni
- (Malaysia) Santokh Singh
- (Malaysia) Soh Chin Aun
- (North Korea) An Chang-nam
- (North Korea) An Se-uk
- (North Korea) Kim Mun-chol
- (Philippines) Rey Ferraren
- (Qatar) Anbar Bashir
- (Singapore) Wong Kok Choy
- (South Korea) Kim Jae-han
- (South Korea) Lee Kang-jo
- (South Korea) Park Sang-in
- (South Korea) Park Sung-hwa
- (South Korea) Shin Hyun-ho
- (Sri Lanka) Sohan Fernando
- (Sri Lanka) W. Sumathipala
- (Syria) Ahmad Qaddour
- (Thailand) Daoyod Dara
- (Thailand) Jesdaporn Naphatalung
- (Thailand) Manus Ratanatisoi
