= Dollah Salleh =

Malaysian footballer and coach

Personal information
- Full name: Dollah Bin Salleh
- Date of birth: 10 October 1963 (age 63)
- Place of birth: Malacca, Malaysia
- Position: Striker

Team information
- Current team: Kuala Lumpur City (head coach)

Senior career*
Years	Team	Apps	(Gls)
1985–1986	Johor	25	(12)
1987–1990	Selangor	180	(39)
1991–1996	Pahang	125	(76)
1997	Malacca	19	(9)
1998	Negeri Sembilan	12	(7)
Total		257	(143)

International career
1984–1996	Malaysia	81	(33)
1996	Malaysia Futsal		

Managerial career
- 2003–2004: MPPJ Selangor
- 2005–2008: Selangor
- 2009: Shahzan Muda
- 2010–2013: Pahang
- 2014: PDRM
- 2014–2015: Malaysia
- 2016: Perlis
- 2017–2020: Pahang
- 2021–2025: Sri Pahang (team manager)
- 2022: Sri Pahang (interim)
- 2026: AMD U17 (technical assistant)
- 2026–: Kuala Lumpur City
Medal record
Men's football
Malaysia
Representing Malaysia (as player)
SEA Games
Gold medal – first place	1989	Team
Representing Malaysia (as manager)
AFF Championship
Runner-up	2014
- * Club domestic league appearances and goals

Dollah Salleh (born 10 October 1963) is a Malaysian football coach and former player. He is well-known to MSL fans as Pablo Dollah. He is one of Malaysia's most decorated players. He is currently the head coach of Malaysia Super League club Kuala Lumpur City.

== Playing career ==
Dollah was one of Malaysia's top footballers in the 1980s and 90s. With striking partner Zainal Abidin Hassan, the two were regarded as the twin strikers by fans. Dollah first played in Malaysian football in 1982. At that time he represented Johor, which was one of the teams in the semi-pro era. When Dollah joined Selangor in 1987, a new twin striker was born after the era of Hassan Sani and James Wong. He and Zainal became a fierce striking duo for both Selangor and the Malaysia national team. In 1991, he left Selangor to join Pahang with Zainal and Singapore football star Fandi Ahmad where they created a 'dream team', winning both the league and Malaysia Cup in 1992.

With the national team, Dollah won the gold medal at the 1989 Southeast Asian Games. He also helped the national team to won the 1993 Merdeka Tournament by beating South Korea 3–1. Dollah also played in the first edition of ASEAN Football Championship, where the national team reached the final of the competition but lost 0–1 to Thailand. He also played for the Malaysia national futsal team, and was on the squad that took part in the 1996 FIFA Futsal World Championship in Spain. Dollah retired as a player after the 1998 season ended, last playing for Negeri Sembilan. Overall, Dollah had total 81 caps with 33 international goals for Malaysia. He has also been an influence on players such as Safee Sali and LJ Green.

== Career statistics ==
Scores and results list Malaysia's goal tally first, score column indicates score after each Dollah Salleh goal.

List of international goals scored by him
No.	Date	Venue	Opponent	Score	Result	Competition
1	20 March 1985	Kuala Lumpur, Malaysia	South Korea		1–0	World Cup Qualifier
2	31 March 1985	Kuala Lumpur, Malaysia	Nepal		5–0	World Cup Qualifier
3	30 July 1985	Kuala Lumpur, Malaysia	Ghana		1–0	1985 Merdeka Tournament
4	13 October 1985	Singapore	Brunei		4–0	1985 Merlion Cup
5	8 December 1985	Bangkok, Thailand	Thailand		1–1	1985 SEA Games
6	10 December 1985	Bangkok, Thailand	Philippines		6–0	1985 SEA Games
7	27 July 1986	Kuala Lumpur, Malaysia	Thailand		2–0	1986 Merdeka Tournament
8	1 August 1986	Kuala Lumpur, Malaysia	Japan		2–1	1986 Merdeka Tournament
9	23 August 1986	Kuala Lumpur, Malaysia	Algeria		2–2	Friendly Match
10	16 September 1987	Jakarta, Indonesia	Thailand		2–0	1987 SEA Games
11	7 April 1988	Kuala Lumpur, Malaysia	Pakistan		4–0	1988 Asian Cup Qualifiers
12	23 May 1989	Seoul, South Korea	Nepal		2–0	1990 World Cup Qualifiers
13	25 May 1989	Seoul, South Korea	Singapore		1–0	1990 World Cup Qualifiers
14	3 June 1989	Singapore	Singapore		2–2	1990 World Cup Qualifiers
15	7 June 1989	Singapore	Nepal		3–0	1990 World Cup Qualifiers
16	7 June 1989	Singapore	Nepal		3–0	1990 World Cup Qualifiers
17	31 August 1989	Kuala Lumpur, Malaysia	Singapore		3–1	1989 Sea Games
18	5 February 1993	Kuala Lumpur, Malaysia	Singapore		2–1	1993 Merdeka Tournament
19	7 February 1993	Kuala Lumpur, Malaysia	Thailand		1–1	1993 Merdeka Tournament
20	14 February 1993	Kuala Lumpur, Malaysia	South Korea		3–1	1993 Merdeka Tournament
21	9 June 1993	Singapore	Brunei		3–1	1993 SEA Games
22	11 June 1993	Singapore	Laos		9–0	1993 SEA Games
23	11 June 1993	Singapore	Laos		9–0	1993 SEA Games
24	11 June 1993	Singapore	Laos		9–0	1993 SEA Games
25	11 June 1993	Singapore	Laos		9–0	1993 SEA Games
26	11 June 1993	Singapore	Laos		9–0	1993 SEA Games
27	1 October 1994	Hiroshima, Japan	Hong Kong		4–3	1994 Asian Games
28	7 October 1994	Omamichi, Japan	Saudi Arabia		1–2	1994 Asian Games
29	10 December 1995	Lamphun, Thailand	Cambodia		9–0	1993 SEA Games
30	10 December 1995	Lamphun, Thailand	Cambodia		9–0	1993 SEA Games
31	10 December 1995	Lamphun, Thailand	Cambodia		9–0	1993 SEA Games
32	6 March 1996	Shah Alam, Malaysia	India		5–2	1996 Asian Qualifiers
33	6 March 1996	Shah Alam, Malaysia	India		5–2	1996 Asian Qualifiers

== Managerial career ==
Dollah started his coaching career with Selangor MPPJ in 2003. The same year he guided the team to become the first-ever club to win the Malaysia Cup by beating Sabah 3–0. He later guided Selangor MPPJ to win the Malaysia Charity Shield and Malaysia Premier League in 2004. In 2005, Selangor signed a long deal with him. That year, Selangor won three trophies: the Malaysia Premier League, Malaysia FA Cup, and Malaysia Cup. However, in the 2005–06 season, Selangor failed to keep their momentum as they failed to win any trophy. Even though Selangor failed to win any trophy, Selangor kept Dollah in charge for the 2006–07 season. The 2007–08 season saw the revival of Selangor as they went through to the final of the Malaysia FA Cup and Malaysia Cup. However, they were beaten by Kedah with the same score line in the two finals. This failure saw Dollah let go by the management.

In the 2009 season, Dollah reunited with his old partner Zainal. This time they played the role of manager and coach for Kuantan Port-Shahzan Muda. In the middle of the 2009 season, he went on to coach Pahang, replacing Tajuddin Noor. After successfully helping Pahang lift its first Malaysia Cup in 21 years, Dollah signed on to coach PDRM for the 2014 season in the Malaysian second-tier league. In his only season with PDRM, he guided them to the 2014 Malaysia Premier League title and a promotion to the Super League.

Dollah was appointed as the new head coach of Malaysia national team in June 2014, signing a 2-year contract. He led Malaysia to second place in the 2014 AFF Championship. However, he received much criticism as he was responsible for twin 0–6 defeats at the hands of Palestine and Oman, and the team's failure to get three points against Timor Leste, Bangladesh and Hong Kong, and losing to Tajikistan and Syria that were once at the same standard as Malaysia earlier in 2014. On 3 September 2015, he had similar fate as Otto Rehhagel (12–0 loss), Aji Santoso (10–0 loss) and Luiz Felipe Scolari (1–7 loss) when his straw the largest record defeat of the national team, a 0–10 loss at the hands of the United Arab Emirates. This subsequently led him to resign as the head coach.

== Managerial statistics ==
As of match played 22 November 2026

Managerial record by team and tenure
Team	Nat.	From	To	Record					Ref.
Team	Nat.	From	To	G	W	D	L	Win %	Ref.
MPPJ Selangor	(Malaysia)	1 July 2003	31 December 2004	55	30	11	14	54.55	
Selangor	(Malaysia)	1 January 2005	31 December 2008	171	88	35	48	51.46	
Shahzan Muda	(Malaysia)	1 January 2009	31 December 2009	26	7	6	13	26.92	
Pahang	(Malaysia)	1 January 2010	31 December 2013	143	62	28	53	43.36	
PDRM	(Malaysia)	1 January 2014	27 June 2014	26	18	5	3	69.23	
Malaysia	(Malaysia)	28 June 2014	5 September 2015	18	4	4	10	22.22	
Perlis	(Malaysia)	1 January 2016	31 December 2016	24	11	4	9	45.83	
Pahang	(Malaysia)	1 January 2017	31 December 2020	124	64	30	30	51.61	
Sri Pahang (interim)	(Malaysia)	21 July 2022	31 December 2022	14	6	2	6	42.86	
Kuala Lumpur City	(Malaysia)	1 July 2026	Present	10	3	2	5	30.00	
Career Total				611	293	127	191	47.95	

== Honours ==
=== Club ===
Johor

- Malaysia Cup: 1985
- Malaysia Charity Shield: 1986

Selangor

- M-League: 1989, 1990
- Malaysia Charity Shield: 1987, 1990

Pahang

- Malaysia Premier League I: 1992, 1995
- Malaysia Cup: 1992
- Malaysia Charity Shield: 1992, 1993

=== International ===
Malaysia

- Pestabola Merdeka: 1986,1993
- SEA Games: (gold) gold 1989 ; (silver) Silver 1987 ; (bronze) bronze 1985
- Tiger Cup: 1996 runner-up

=== As a head coach ===
Malaysia

- AFF Championship runners-up: 2014

MPPJ

- Malaysia Cup: 2003
- Malaysia Premier League: 2004
- Malaysia Charity Shield: 2004

Selangor

- Malaysia Premier League: 2005
- Malaysia FA Cup: 2005
- Malaysia Cup: 2005

Pahang

- Malaysia Premier League runners-up: 2012
- Malaysia Cup: 2013
- Malaysia FA Cup: 2018

PDRM

- Malaysia Premier League: 2014

==== Individual ====
- FAM Football Awards – Best Coach: 2013, 2019
