= Isa Bakar =

Malaysian footballer

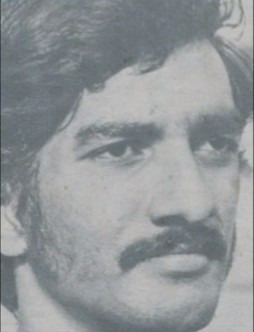

Personal information
- Date of birth: 25 December 1952
- Place of birth: Penang, British Malaya
- Date of death: 28 August 2010 (aged 57)
- Height: 1.71 m (5 ft 7 in)
- Position: Striker

Senior career*
Years	Team	Apps	(Gls)
1970–1980	Penang		
1981	Penang Port Commission		
1982	Penang		
1983	Penang Port Commission		
1984–1986	Penang		

International career
1974–1981	Malaysia	69	(45)
Medal record
Men's football
Representing Malaysia
Asian Games
Third place	1974 Tehran	Team
SEA Games
Gold medal – first place	1977 Kuala Lumpur	Team
Gold medal – first place	1979 Jakarta	Team
- * Club domestic league appearances and goals

Isa Bakar (25 December 1952 – 28 August 2010) was a football player who represented the Malaysian national football team in the 1970s. He played for Penang FA in Malaysia's domestic competition.

== Career overview ==
Isa first played for Penang FA in 1970. Later, he continued playing in the Penang League, having represented the Penang Port Commission team (PPC FC) in the FAM soccer competition in 1981 and 1983. Isa represented Malaysia national team when they finished third in the 1974 Asian Games in Iran when his scored two goals against the only Asian team that was at the 1966 World Cup, North Korea to won 2-1. In the same year, he was part of the Malaysia Cup-winning Penang side. Besides that, in 1976, he also helped the Penang side to won the Aga Khan Gold Cup international tournament held in Dhaka. He was a prolific striker and formed a deadly combination with Mokhtar Dahari when both them scored 16 goals for national team in 1976. Overall, Isa had total 69 caps with 45 international goals for Malaysia.

On 11 May 1975, Isa is also part of the Malaysia Selection that played against Arsenal FC in a friendly match which his team won by 2-0 at Merdeka Stadium. Later, He scored 1 goal which ended in a 1–1 draw against Arsenal in a second match at his Penang home ground, City Stadium.

In 2011, he was honoured by Ex-State & Ex-National Footballers Association of Malaysia to appreciate his contribution to the country as a football player.

On 17 February 2022, IFFHS selected him on their list of Men’s All Time Malaysia Dream Team.

== Personal life ==
His older brother Ali Bakar was also a football player, also playing for Penang and Malaysia.

== Career statistics ==
=== International ===
Scores and results list Malaysia's goal tally first, score column indicates score after each Bakar goal.

List of international goals scored by Isa Bakar
No.	Date	Venue	Opponent	Score	Result	Competition	Ref.
1	7 September 1974	Apadana Stadium, Tehran, Iran	Philippines	—	11-0	1974 Asian Games	
2	7 September 1974	Apadana Stadium, Tehran, Iran	Philippines	—	11-0	1974 Asian Games	
3	15 September 1974	Aryamehr Stadium, Tehran, Iran	North Korea	1-0	2-1	1974 Asian Games	
4	15 September 1974	Aryamehr Stadium, Tehran, Iran	North Korea	2-1	2-1	1974 Asian Games	
5	16 March 1975	Bangkok, Thailand	South Korea	1-0	2-1	1976 AFC Asian Cup qualification	
6	18 March 1975	Bangkok, Thailand	Thailand	1-0	1-0	1976 AFC Asian Cup qualification	
7	23 March 1975	Bangkok, Thailand	South Vietnam	—	3-0	1976 AFC Asian Cup qualification	
8	14 June 1975	Jakarta, Indonesia	Indonesia	—	1-3	1975 Jakarta Anniversary Tournament	
9	2 August 1975	Kuala Lumpur, Malaysia	Japan	—	2-0	1975 Merdeka Tournament	
10	6 August 1975	Kuala Lumpur, Malaysia	Bangladesh	—	3-0	1975 Merdeka Tournament	
11	8 August 1975	Kuala Lumpur, Malaysia	Hong Kong	—	3-1	1975 Merdeka Tournament	
12	14 August 1975	Kuala Lumpur, Malaysia	Indonesia	—	2-1	1975 Merdeka Tournament	
13	15 February 1975	Jakarta, Indonesia	Papua New Guinea	—	10-1	1976 Summer Olympics qualification	
14	15 February 1975	Jakarta, Indonesia	Papua New Guinea	—	10-1	1976 Summer Olympics qualification	
15	15 February 1975	Jakarta, Indonesia	Papua New Guinea	—	10-1	1976 Summer Olympics qualification	
16	15 February 1975	Jakarta, Indonesia	Papua New Guinea	—	10-1	1976 Summer Olympics qualification	
17	15 February 1975	Jakarta, Indonesia	Papua New Guinea	—	10-1	1976 Summer Olympics qualification	
18	22 February 1976	Jakarta, Indonesia	Singapore	—	6-0	1976 Summer Olympics qualification	
19	22 February 1976	Jakarta, Indonesia	Singapore	—	6-0	1976 Summer Olympics qualification	
20	24 February 1976	Jakarta, Indonesia	Indonesia	—	1-2	1976 Summer Olympics qualification	
21	7 August 1976	Stadium Merdeka, Kuala Lumpur, Malaysia	South Korea	—	2-1	1976 Merdeka Tournament	
22	12 August 1976	Stadium Merdeka, Kuala Lumpur, Malaysia	India	—	5-1	1976 Merdeka Tournament	
23	12 August 1976	Stadium Merdeka, Kuala Lumpur, Malaysia	India	—	5-1	1976 Merdeka Tournament	
24	14 August 1976	Stadium Merdeka, Kuala Lumpur, Malaysia	Indonesia	—	7-1	1976 Merdeka Tournament	
25	17 August 1976	Stadium Merdeka, Kuala Lumpur, Malaysia	Burma	—	3-1	1976 Merdeka Tournament	
26	11 September 1976	Dongdaemun Stadium, Seoul, South Korea	South Korea	2-0	4-4	1976 Korea Cup	
27	13 September 1976	Dongdaemun Stadium, Seoul, South Korea	Singapore	1-0	4-1	1976 Korea Cup	
28	19 September 1976	Dongdaemun Stadium, Seoul, South Korea	India	—	4-1	1976 Korea Cup	
29	1 March 1977	National Stadium, Kallang, Singapore	Thailand	2-0	6-4	1978 FIFA World Cup qualification	
30	1 March 1977	National Stadium, Kallang, Singapore	Thailand	3-0	6-4	1978 FIFA World Cup qualification	
31	29 July 1977	Stadium Merdeka, Kuala Lumpur, Malaysia	Indonesia	—	5-1	1977 Merdeka Tournament	
32	1 November 1977	Bangkok, Thailand	Singapore	—	4-3	1977 King's Cup	
33	1 November 1977	Bangkok, Thailand	Singapore	—	4-3	1977 King's Cup	
34	1 November 1977	Bangkok, Thailand	Singapore	—	4-3	1977 King's Cup	
35	6 November 1977	Bangkok, Thailand	Thailand	—		1977 King's Cup	
36	6 November 1977	Bangkok, Thailand	Thailand	—		1977 King's Cup	
37	10 November 1977	Bangkok, Thailand	India	—	3-0	1977 King's Cup	
38	10 November 1977	Bangkok, Thailand	India	—	3-0	1977 King's Cup	
39	21 November 1977	Stadium Merdeka, Kuala Lumpur, Malaysia	Philippines	3-0	5-0	1977 Southeast Asian Games	
40	25 November 1977	Stadium Merdeka, Kuala Lumpur, Malaysia	Burma	5-1	9-1	1977 Southeast Asian Games	
41	25 November 1977	Stadium Merdeka, Kuala Lumpur, Malaysia	Burma	6-1	9-1	1977 Southeast Asian Games	
42	10 December 1978	Bangkok, Thailand	India	1-0	1-0	1978 Asian Games	
43	12 December 1978	Bangkok, Thailand	Bangladesh	1-0	1-0	1978 Asian Games	
44	17 December 1978	Bangkok, Thailand	Thailand	—	1-2	1978 Asian Games	
45	14 November 1979	Kuala Lumpur, Malaysia	Sweden	—	1-3	Friendly	

== Honours ==
Penang

- Malaysia Cup: 1974
- Aga Khan Gold Cup: 1976
- Malaysia League: 1982

PPC

- Malaysia FAM Cup: 1981, 1983

Malaysia

- Bronze medal Asian Games: 1974
- Gold Medal SEA Games: 1977, 1979
- Merdeka Tournament: 1976
- King's Cup: 1977
