= Soh Chin Ann =

Malaysian footballer

Yang Berbahagia Datuk Wira Soh Chin Ann DCSM DSIS DIMP AMN
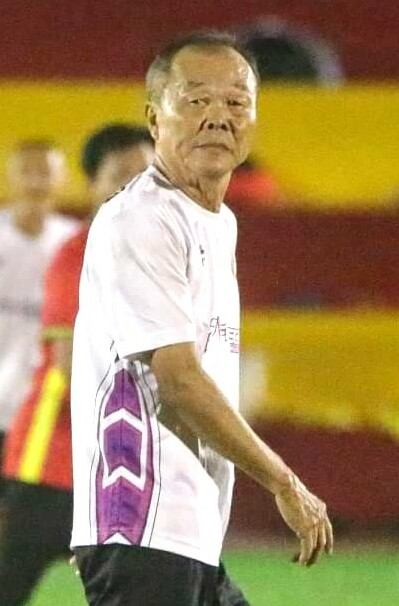
- Soh in 2020

Personal information
- Date of birth: 28 July 1950 (age 76)
- Place of birth: Alor Gajah, Malacca, British Malaya
- Position: Centre-back

Youth career
- 1969: Malacca

Senior career*
| Years | Team | Apps | (Gls) |
| 1969–1970 | Malacca | | |
| 1971–1978 | Selangor | | |
| 1979–1985 | Malacca | | |
| 1988 | Malacca | | |

International career
| 1969–1984 | Malaysia | 195 (Note: Excludes 24 unofficial Olympic matches: Japan (1971, 1980, 1984), South Korea (1971, 1980 twice), Taiwan (1971), Philippines (1971, 1980), West Germany, United States, Morocco (1972), Papua New Guinea, Singapore (1976), Indonesia (1976, 1980, 1983), Brunei (1980), Saudi Arabia (twice), India (1983), Qatar, Thailand and Iraq (1984).) | (13) |

Managerial career
- 1989: Malacca
Medal record
Men's football
Representing Malaysia
Asian Games
| Third place | 1974 Tehran | Team |
SEA Games
| Gold medal – first place | 1977 Kuala Lumpur | Team |
| Gold medal – first place | 1979 Jakarta | Team |
| Silver medal – second place | 1971 Bangkok | Team |
| Silver medal – second place | 1975 Bangkok | Team |
| Bronze medal – third place | 1983 Singapore | Team |
| Bronze medal – third place | 1973 Singapore | Team |
- * Club domestic league appearances and goals

Datuk Wira Soh Chin Ann (or Soh Chin Aun due to misspelling by Malaysian media; simplified Chinese: 苏进安; traditional Chinese: 蘇進安; pinyin: Sū Jìn'ān; born 28 July 1950) is a Malaysian former footballer who played as a defender. He was affectionately known as Tauke or Towkay (Boss) by his teammates and fans.

Soh was regarded as the most capped player in men's international football, though the total varied by source. The RSSSF and IFFHS credited him with 219 appearances, a record later surpassed by Cristiano Ronaldo in 2025. FIFA, by contrast, recognised 195 official caps, a record overtaken by Bader Al-Mutawa in 2022.

== Club career ==
Soh started his football career with Malacca in 1969. He joined Selangor in 1971 and played for them until 1978, winning six Malaysia Cup titles. He returned to star for Malacca in 1979 and won the League Cup title in 1983 but was inactive for two years due to a one-year suspension in 1985. He captained Malacca in 1988 which was also his last appearances in the domestic league.

== International career ==
=== National team ===
At the age of 19, Soh earned his full international call up for Malaysia at the 1969 King's Cup. In 1971, when he played in the Olympic qualifier in Seoul, South Korea, he was the youngest member of the national team at the age of 21. He participated in the 1972 Munich Olympic Games and played all three group games. He also was the captain of the team that qualified for the 1980 Moscow Olympic Games. Malaysia did not participate in that edition of the Olympics after joining the U.S.-led boycott to protest the Soviet Union's invasion of Afghanistan. However, because of his contribution for helping Malaysia to qualify for the Olympics, he was awarded the Ahli Mangku Negara by the Yang di-Pertuan Agong. He later took part in the 1980 AFC Asian Cup, where his Malaysia was eliminated from the group stage, yet Malaysia produced one of the finest performance ever under his leadership, with the team gaining a famous 1–1 draw over powerhouse South Korea; Soh gained fame as well for having an exceptional tournament, allowing him to be named into the Team of the Tournament by the AFC, the first Southeast Asian to receive such honour, a record which would stand until the 2019 AFC Asian Cup.

=== Malaysia Selection ===
On 11 May 1975, Soh was part of the Malaysia Selection that played against Arsenal FC in a friendly match, which the team won 2–0 at the Merdeka Stadium.

== Retirement ==
He retired from international football in 1984 and made 250 international appearances as recorded by Football Association of Malaysia. Asian Football Confederation recognised his achievements and included him into AFC Century Club in February 1999.

== Post-playing career ==
He was appointed as the chairman of the referees' committee on 13 March 2007. He was the team manager (not head coach) of Malaysia national football team from 2007 until 2009.

== Political engagement ==
Soh has once contested the Parliament of Malaysia for Kota Melaka representing Malaysian Chinese Association (MCA) of Barisan Nasional (BN) in 1986 but he suffered a defeat of 17,606 votes to Lim Guan Eng of Democratic Action Party (DAP).

=== Election results ===
Parliament of Malaysia
| Year | Constituency | Candidate | Votes | Pct | Opponent(s) | Votes | Pct | Ballots cast | Majority | Turnout |
|---|---|---|---|---|---|---|---|---|---|---|
| 1986 | P113 Kota Melaka | Soh Chin Ann (MCA) | 16,967 | 32.92% | Lim Guan Eng (DAP) | 34,573 | 67.08% | 52,840 | 17,606 | 76.54% |

== Personal life ==
In 2016, he made a cameo appearance in Ola Bola as Soh Chin Aun, a character based on himself in the 1980 Moscow Olympics qualification campaign.

== Career statistics ==
=== International ===
Appearances and goals by national team and year
| National team | Year | Apps | Goals |
|---|---|---|---|
| Malaysia | 1969 | 3 | 0 |
| Malaysia | 1970 | 12 | 0 |
| Malaysia | 1971 | 19 | 1 |
| Malaysia | 1972 | 16 | 3 |
| Malaysia | 1973 | 20 | 1 |
| Malaysia | 1974 | 12 | 0 |
| Malaysia | 1975 | 19 | 0 |
| Malaysia | 1976 | 16 | 2 |
| Malaysia | 1977 | 17 | 1 |
| Malaysia | 1978 | 16 | 0 |
| Malaysia | 1979 | 17 | 1 |
| Malaysia | 1980 | 19 | 1 |
| Malaysia | 1981 | 8 | 1 |
| Malaysia | 1982 | 0 | 0 |
| Malaysia | 1983 | 8 | 1 |
| Malaysia | 1984 | 17 | 1 |
| Total | | 219 | 13 |

Scores and results list Malaysia's goal tally first, score column indicates score after each Ann goal.

List of international goals scored by Soh Chin Ann
| No. | Date | Venue | Opponent | Score | Result | Competition |
|---|---|---|---|---|---|---|
| 1 | 22 May 1971 | Bangkok, Thailand | Brunei | | 8–0 | 1972 AFC Asian Cup qualification |
| 2 | 29 July 1972 | Merdeka Stadium, Kuala Lumpur, Malaysia | South Korea | | 1–2 | 1972 Merdeka Tournament |
| 3 | 20 September 1972 | Seoul, South Korea | Khmer Republic | | 1–0 | 1972 President's Cup |
| 4 | 22 September 1972 | Seoul, South Korea | Thailand | | 1–1 | 1972 President's Cup |
| 5 | 28 July 1973 | Merdeka Stadium, Kuala Lumpur, Malaysia | Khmer Republic | | 1–0 | 1973 Merdeka Tournament |
| 6 | 12 August 1976 | Merdeka Stadium, Kuala Lumpur, Malaysia | India | | 5–1 | 1976 Merdeka Tournament |
| 7 | 20 August 1976 | Merdeka Stadium, Kuala Lumpur, Malaysia | Japan | | 2–2 | 1976 Merdeka Tournament |
| 8 | 29 July 1977 | Merdeka Stadium, Kuala Lumpur, Malaysia | Indonesia | | 5–1 | 1977 Merdeka Tournament |
| 9 | 9 May 1979 | Bangkok, Thailand | North Korea | | 1–1 | 1980 AFC Asian Cup qualification |
| 10 | 2 November 1980 | Merdeka Stadium, Kuala Lumpur, Malaysia | Morocco | | 1–2 | 1980 Merdeka Tournament |
| 11 | 17 April 1981 | Merdeka Stadium, Kuala Lumpur, Malaysia | Singapore | | 1–2 | Ovaltine Cup |
| 12 | 19 September 1983 | Sultan Muhammad IV Stadium, Kota Bahru, Malaysia | Nepal | | 7–0 | 1983 Merdeka Tournament |
| 13 | 3 April 1984 | Christchurch, New Zealand | New Zealand | | 1–6 | Friendly |

== Honours ==
Selangor

- Malaysia Cup: 1971, 1972, 1973, 1975, 1976, 1978

Malacca

- Malaysian League: 1983

Malaysia

- Asian Games Bronze Medal: 1974
- SEA Games: 1977, 1979
- Merdeka Tournament: 1973, 1974, 1976, 1979
- King's Cup: 1972, 1976, 1978
- Jakarta Anniversary Tournament: 1970

Individual

- AFC Asian Cup Team of the Tournament: 1980
- AFC Asian All Stars: 1982
- MasterCard Asian/Oceanian Team of the 20th Century: 1998
- AFC Century Club: 1999
- OCM Hall of Fame: 2004
- Asian Football Hall of Fame: 2014
- Goal.com The best Malaysia XI of all time: 2020
- IFFHS Men's All Time Malaysia Dream Team: 2022

Records

- Malaysia national football team all-time most appearances: 219
- The first men's footballers to reach 200 or more international caps (according to RSSSF and IFFHS): 219
- 20th century most international caps in men's football (1901–2000): 219
- The first Asian footballers to reach 100 or more international wins for national team: 108
- The first footballers to reach 100 or more international wins for national team (1969–1984): 108

Order

- Malaysia
  - Member of the Order of the Defender of the Realm (AMN) (1980)
- Pahang
  - Knight Companion of the Order of the Crown of Pahang (DIMP) – Dato' (2000)
- Selangor
  - Knight Companion of the Order of Sultan Sharafuddin Idris Shah (DSIS) – Dato' (2016)
- Malacca
  - Knight Commander of the Exalted Order of Malacca (DCSM) – Datuk Wira (2021)

== See also ==
- List of men's footballers with 100 or more international caps
- List of progression men's association football caps record
