= Hassan Sani =

Malaysian footballer

Datuk Hassan Sani
Personal information
- Full name: Hassan Sani
- Date of birth: 31 August 1958 (age 68)
- Place of birth: Labuan, Malaysia
- Height: 1.66 m (5 ft 5 in)
- Position: Forward

Youth career
- 1974–1976: Sabah FA

Senior career*
Years	Team	Apps	(Gls)
1977–1984	Sabah FA	133	(55)
1985–1987	Kuala Lumpur FA	42	(18)
1988–1992	Sabah FA	47	(18)
Total		222	(91)

International career
1978–1986	Malaysia	30	(14)
1996–1999	Malaysia Beach Football Team		
Medal record
Men's football
Representing Malaysia
SEA Games
Gold medal – first place	1979 Jakarta	Team
- * Club domestic league appearances and goals

Hassan Sani PGDK (born 31 August 1958) is a former Malaysian football player.

== Career Overview ==
He played for Sabah and Kuala Lumpur in the Malaysian League and Malaysia Cup in the late 1970s and in the 1980s. Hassan start representing Malaysia in youth competition from 1977–1978. He brought into the senior team in 1978 by Karl Heinz Weigang. He is remembered as a member of the potent strike force comprising the likes of Mokhtar Dahari and James Wong (another player from Sabah). He was called "lipas kudung" because of his agility and was a member of the Malaysia squad that qualified for the 1980 Olympics in Moscow after defeating South Korea in 1980 Asian Olympic Qualifying Tournaments. Unfortunately, Malaysia did not go as it joined the US-led boycott towards Soviet Union for its role in supporting the Democratic Republic of Afghanistan against the Islamic Unity of Afghanistan Mujahideen.

== Further career ==
In 1996, Hassan join Malaysia national beach soccer team and played in the 1999 Beach Soccer World Championship as well. In 2015, he together with Wong was appointed as one of the members for the management team of Sabah FA.

== Career statistics ==
=== International ===
Scores and results list Malaysia's goal tally first, score column indicates score after each Hassan Sani goal.

List of international goals scored by Hassan Sani
No.	Date	Venue	Opponent	Score	Result	Competition
1	8 September 1977	Seoul, South Korea	Bahrain		3–1	1977 Korea President Cup
2	23 September 1979	Jakarta, Indonesia	Singapore		2–0	1979 SEA Games
3	16 March 1980	Kuala Lumpur, Malaysia	China		3–1	Friendly
4	16 March 1980	Kuala Lumpur, Malaysia	China		3–1	Friendly
5	21 March 1980	Seoul, South Korea	Indonesia		6–1	1980 Olympics Qualifications
6	21 March 1980	Seoul, South Korea	Indonesia		6–1	1980 Olympics Qualifications
7	21 March 1980	Seoul, South Korea	Indonesia		6–1	1980 Olympics Qualifications
8	2 April 1980	Kuala Lumpur, Malaysia	Philippines		8–0	1980 Olympics Qualifications
9	2 April 1980	Kuala Lumpur, Malaysia	Philippines		8–0	1980 Olympics Qualifications
10	15 October 1980	Kuala Lumpur, Malaysia	Morocco		2–0	1980 Merdeka Tournament
11	17 October 1980	Kuala Lumpur, Malaysia	Myanmar		3–2	1980 Merdeka Tournament
12	23 October 1980	Kuala Lumpur, Malaysia	Indonesia		1–1	1980 Merdeka Tournament
13	30 October 1980	Kuala Lumpur, Malaysia	New Zealand		2–0	1980 Merdeka Tournament
14	4 September 1984	Kuala Lumpur, Malaysia	Papua New Guinea		5–1	1984 Merdeka Tournament

== Honours ==
Sabah

- Malaysian League Tournament runner-up: 1979
- Borneo Cup: 1977, 1978, 1979, 1980, 1982

Kuala Lumpur

- Malaysian First Division: 1986
- Malaysia Cup: 1987

=== International ===
- SEA Games: 1979
- Merdeka Tournament: 1979

=== Individual ===
- Borneo Cup top scorer: 1982
- AFC Asian All Stars: 1982
- SAFA Commemoration Award: 2019

=== Order ===
- Sabah
  - Commander of the Order of Kinabalu (PGDK) - Datuk (2016)
