= James Yaakub =

Malaysian footballer

Personal information
- Date of birth: 1953
- Place of birth: Sarawak, Malaysia
- Date of death: February 2009 (aged 55–56)
- Place of death: Kuching, Sarawak, Malaysia
- Position: Striker

Senior career*
Years	Team	Apps	(Gls)
1972–1985	Sarawak		

International career
1977–1978	Malaysia	8	(4)
Medal record
Men's football
Representing Malaysia
Southeast Asian Games
Gold medal – first place	1977 Malaysia	Team
- * Club domestic league appearances and goals

James Yaakub (1953 – February 2009) was a Malaysian footballer. He play for Sarawak in the 1970s and 1980s as a striker.

== International career ==
James Yaakub represented Malaysia from 1977 to 1978. He was a part of the Malaysian team that won the gold medals in the regional SEA Games in 1977. He also participated in the 1978 King's Cup, 1978 Jakarta Anniversary Tournament and the 1978 Merdeka Tournament.

== Honours ==
=== Club ===
Sarawak

- Borneo Cup

Winners: 1983

=== International ===
- SEA Games

Winners: 1977

- King's Cup

Winners:1978
