= Mohammad Abdul Halim =

Bangladeshi footballer

Abdul Halim
Personal information
- Full name: Mohammad Abdul Halim
- Place of birth: Mymensingh, East Pakistan (present-day Bangladesh)
- Position: Striker

Senior career*
Years	Team	Apps	(Gls)
1974	Holden XI		
1975	Fire Service		
1976	PWD		
1977–1980	Rahmatganj		
1981	Wari		
1982	Brothers Union		

International career
1977	Bangladesh U19		
1976–1979	Bangladesh		
- * Club domestic league appearances and goals

Mohammad Abdul Halim (Bengali: মোহাম্মদ আব্দুল হালিম) is a Bangladeshi former footballer who played as a striker for the Bangladesh national team from 1976 to 1979.

Halim scored three goals during 1980 AFC Asian Cup qualification, and helped Bangladesh qualify for the main tournament for the first time ever. Halim was the joint–top goal scorer in the 1976 First Division League season while playing for PWD SC, however, he did not play for Bangladesh's big teams, spending majority of his club career in the top-tier with Rahmatganj MFS.

== Early life ==
In his school years, Halim immersed himself in athletics, taking part in a multitude of high jump and marathon inter-school competitions.

== Club career ==
Halim's Dhaka career started with Holden XI in 1974. The following year, he played for the Fire Service AC in the Dhaka Second Division. In 1976, Halim got a chance to play top level of football in Dhaka, the First Division. He joined office team PWD SC and became the joint–top goal scorer in the league with 13 goals alongside Hafizuddin Ahmed of Mohammedan SC. Halim went onto join fellow league minnows Rahmatganj MFS.

== International career ==
Being the league's joint–top scorer, Halim was called up to the Bangladesh national team and went on to participate in the 1976 King Cup. Halim, who played in the 1977 AFC Youth Championship, was on standby for the 1978 AFC Youth Championship in Dhaka but didn't make the final list. Halim's start with the senior national team was promising. In 1979, Halim scored a brace against Afghanistan in the qualifying round of the Asian Cup in Dhaka, after Bangladesh fell two goals behind in the first half. He helped Bangladesh qualify for the 1980 AFC Asian Cup as he scored during a 3–2 win against Afghanistan during their third qualifying match in Dhaka. However, Halim's international career came to an early end due to a knee injury.

== Personal life ==
Born in Ishwarganj Upazila of the Mymensingh District, Halim has two sons, who were also former football players and played in the Dhaka Third Division Football League. After retiring from playing professional football, Halim joined the coaching profession, but did not stick with it for too long.

In February 2022, Halim informed media that he has been suffering from a heart disease for a long time and his physical condition is gradually deteriorating. Along with that, Halim's previous knee injury from his playing days had still not gone away. He also informed that he is unable to get better treatment due to lack of money.

Halim's elder brother, Abdur Razzak, a footballer who played in the First Division in the 70s, died on 23 October 2023.

== International goals ==
#	Date	Venue	Opponent	Score	Result	Competition
1.	1 March 1979	Bangabandhu National Stadium, Dhaka, Bangladesh	Afghanistan	1–2	2–2	1980 AFC Asian Cup qualifiers
2.	1 March 1979	Bangabandhu National Stadium, Dhaka, Bangladesh	Afghanistan	2–2	2–2	1980 AFC Asian Cup qualifiers
3.	5 March 1979	Bangabandhu National Stadium, Dhaka, Bangladesh	Afghanistan	2–1	3–2	1980 AFC Asian Cup qualifiers
