= Bakri Ibni =

Malaysian former football player

Personal information
- Date of birth: 25 August 1952 (age 74)

Youth career
- 1972–1973: Perlis FA

Senior career*
Years	Team	Apps	(Gls)
1974–1984	Perlis FA		
1984–1985	Talasco		

International career
1976–1983	Malaysia	63	(16)

Managerial career
- 1981–1989: Perlis FA
- Bank Rakyat
- 1991: Malaysia (assistant)
- * Club domestic league appearances and goals

Bakri Ibni (born 25 August 1952) is a Malaysian former football player who represented the Malaysian national football team in the 1970s - 1980s.

== Career Overview ==
He played for Perlis FA in Malaysia's domestic competition until 1984 and joined Selangor club Talasco to unite with legendary national striker Mokhtar Dahari. With Talasco, he won Selangor Dunhill Cup and reached Semi-final Malaysia FAM Cup. As a national player, Bakri scored 16 international goals in 63 appearances for Malaysia.

A midfielder, Bakri was in the Malaysia squad that qualified for the 1980 Moscow Olympics football competition (though later Malaysia boycotted the Games). He scored one of the two goals in the 2-1 win over South Korea that decided the qualifiers for the Olympics, the other goal was scored by James Wong. In 1980, Bakri represented Malaysia in the AFC Asian Cup in Kuwait. Bakri also represented Malaysia in other competitions, winning the 1979 Merdeka Cup and 1978 King's Cup. On 26 November 1977, He was also in the national squads that won gold medals in the regional SEA Games.

From 1981-1983, Bakri had coached Perlis FA while he was still playing for them. He later returned to coach them again in the 1990s. Bakri has also coached Bank Rakyat football team in the local inter-bank championship, JKR Perlis, and as assistant head coach to Malaysia national team coach Rahim Abdullah in 1991.

In 2020, Goal.com selected him on their list of The best Malaysia XI of all time.

== Honours ==
Perlis

- Malaysia Kings Gold Cup: runners-up 1974, 1977

Malaysia

- SEA Games: 1977
- King's Cup: 1978
- Merdeka Tournament: 1979
