= Malaysia League XI =

National association football team

- Association: Football Association of Malaysia (Persatuan Bola Sepak Malaysia – FAM)
- Home stadium: Bukit Jalil National Stadium
- FIFA code: MAS

First international
- (Malaysia) Malaya 4–3 British Army (United Kingdom) (Kuala Lumpur, Malaya; 26 May 1962)

Biggest win
- Malaysia 6–0 Indonesia (Jakarta, Indonesia; 27 July 2012)

Biggest defeat
- Malaysia 0–6 Manchester United (England) (Kuala Lumpur, Malaysia; 23 July 2001)

The Malaysia League XI, commonly known as MSL All Stars, Malaysia Selection or Malaysia League Selection, represents the Malaysia Super League in friendly matches. Malaysia League XI mainly plays friendly international matches against clubs, while the competitive matches are played by the Malaysia national team.

== History ==
The Malaysia League XI is composed of top players from the Malaysia Super League, with many also featuring in the national team. The Malaysia League XI typically plays exhibition matches against football clubs from around the world, primarily from England.

In recent years, the Football Association of Malaysia has arranged occasional matches between the Malaysia League XI and visiting international clubs. However, the team has not played any matches for several years, as it only competes when formally invited. These matches are usually part of the visiting club’s pre-season preparations. Since their first match in 1962, the Malaysia League XI has recorded four wins and five draws.

== Fixtures and results ==
Date	Location	Head coach	Opponent	Result	Malaysia goalscorers	Refs
26 May 1962	Merdeka Stadium	Harun Haji Idris	(United Kingdom) British Army	4–3 (W)		
8 May 1974	Perak Stadium	Jalil Che Din	(England) Everton	0–1 (L)		
11 May 1975	Merdeka Stadium	M. Chandran	(England) Arsenal	2–0 (W)	Mokhtar 45', 77'	
14 May 1975	City Stadium, Penang	M. Chandran	(England) Arsenal	1–1 (D)	Isa 75'	
31 July 1982	Merdeka Stadium	M. Chandran	(England) Nottingham Forest	0–3 (L)		
18 May 1983	Merdeka Stadium	Frank Lord	(England) Newcastle United	2–5 (L)	Zainal ?'; Chen Wooi Haw ?'	
20 May 1983	Darulmakmur Stadium	Frank Lord	(England) Newcastle United	0–1 (L)		
11 August 1989	Merdeka Stadium	Trevor Hartley	(England) Everton	0–0 (D) (lose 2–4 on PSO)		
20 May 1991	Merdeka Stadium	Rahim Abdullah	(England) Aston Villa	0–4 (L)		
7 May 1995	Shah Alam Stadium	Claude Le Roy	(Brazil) Flamengo XI	1–1 (D)	Badrul 39'	
19 July 1999	National Stadium, Bukit Jalil	Abdul Rahman Ibrahim	(England) Arsenal	0–2 (L)		(Note: See 1998–99 Arsenal F.C. season.)
23 July 2001	National Stadium, Bukit Jalil	Allan Harris	(England) Manchester United	0–6 (L)		(Note: See 2001–02 Manchester United F.C. season.)
17 July 2004	National Stadium, Bukit Jalil	Allan Harris	(England) Norwich City	0–1 (L)		
29 July 2008	Shah Alam Stadium	B. Sathianathan	(England) Chelsea	0–2 (L)		(Note: See 2008–09 Chelsea F.C. season.)
18 July 2009	National Stadium, Bukit Jalil	K. Rajagopal	(England) Manchester United	2–3 (L)	Amri 45', 52'	(Note: See 2009–10 Manchester United F.C. season.)
20 July 2009	National Stadium, Bukit Jalil	K. Rajagopal	(England) Manchester United	0–2 (L)		
13 July 2011	National Stadium, Bukit Jalil	K. Rajagopal	(England) Arsenal	0–4 (L)		(Note: See 2011–12 Arsenal F.C. season.)
16 July 2011	National Stadium, Bukit Jalil	K. Rajagopal	(England) Liverpool	3–6 (L)	Safiq 44'; Safee 79', 82'	(Note: See 2011–12 Liverpool F.C. season.)
21 July 2011	National Stadium, Bukit Jalil	Ong Kim Swee	(England) Chelsea	0–1 (L)		(Note: See 2011–12 Chelsea F.C. season.)
24 July 2012	National Stadium, Bukit Jalil	K. Rajagopal	(England) Arsenal	1–2 (L)	Azmi 45+2'	(Note: See 2012–13 Arsenal F.C. season.)
27 July 2012	Gelora Bung Karno Stadium, Jakarta	Ong Kim Swee	Indonesia	6–0 (W)	Hazwan 11'; Kubala 13' (pen.); Azrif 31'; Amri 34', 36'; Shukor 62'	
30 July 2012	National Stadium, Bukit Jalil	K. Rajagopal	(England) Manchester City	1–3 (L)	Azamuddin 87'	(Note: See 2012–13 Manchester City F.C. season.)
16 July 2013	National Stadium, Bukit Jalil	K. Rajagopal	(Thailand) Chonburi	0–0 (D)		
21 July 2013	Shah Alam Stadium	K. Rajagopal	(England) Chelsea	1–4 (L)	Fadhli 90+1'	(Note: See 2013–14 Chelsea F.C. season.)
25 July 2013	Miho Ground, Shimizu, Shizuoka	K. Rajagopal	(Japan) Shimizu S-Pulse	0–2 (L)		
27 July 2013	Banyu Artificial Turf Soccer Field, Hiratsuka, Kanagawa	K. Rajagopal	(Japan) Shonan Bellmare	0–5 (L)		
31 July 2013	Tama City Athletic Stadium, Tama, Tokyo	K. Rajagopal	(Japan) Tokyo Verdy	0–5 (L)		
10 August 2013	Shah Alam Stadium	K. Rajagopal	(Spain) Barcelona	1–3 (L)	Amri 39'	(Note: See 2013–14 FC Barcelona season.)
27 May 2015	Shah Alam Stadium	Dollah Salleh	(England) Tottenham Hotspur	1–2 (L)	Thiago Junio 31'	
24 July 2015	National Stadium, Bukit Jalil	Dollah Salleh	(England) Liverpool	1–1 (D)	Patrick Wleh 13'	(Note: See 2015–16 Liverpool F.C. season.)
28 March 2022	Jalan Besar Stadium	Kim Pan-gon	Albirex Niigata Singapore	3–0 (W)	Krasniqi 9'; Sumareh 45'; Faisal 65'	

== Players ==
=== Current squad ===
- The following players were called up for the friendly matches against Albirex Niigata Singapore, on 28 March 2022.
- Caps and goals are correct as of 26 March 2022 after the match against Singapore with national senior team.

No.	Pos.	Player	Date of birth (age)	Caps	Goals	Club (Note: The club listed is the club for which the player last played a competitive match prior to the call-up.)
1	GK	Farizal Marlias	29 June 1986 (age 39)	50	0	(Football Association of Malaysia) Johor Darul Ta'zim
23	GK	Khairulazhan Khalid	7 November 1989 (age 36)	14	0	(Football Association of Malaysia) Selangor
21	GK	Kalamullah Al-Hafiz	30 July 1995 (age 30)	0	0	(Football Association of Malaysia) Petaling Jaya City
7	DF	Aidil Zafuan	3 August 1987 (age 38)	98	3	(Football Association of Malaysia) Johor Darul Ta'zim
3	DF	Shahrul Saad	8 July 1993 (age 32)	45	5	(Football Association of Malaysia) Johor Darul Ta'zim
22	DF	La'Vere Corbin-Ong	22 April 1991 (age 34)	15	1	(Football Association of Malaysia) Johor Darul Ta'zim
6	DF	Dominic Tan	12 March 1997 (age 29)	8	0	(Football Association of Malaysia) Sabah
2	DF	Dion Cools	4 June 1996 (age 29)	6	0	(Royal Belgian Football Association) Zulte Waregem
24	DF	Khair Jones	29 September 1989 (age 36)	4	1	(Football Association of Malaysia) Negeri Sembilan
5	DF	Quentin Cheng	20 November 1999 (age 26)	3	0	(Football Association of Malaysia) Selangor
28	DF	Khuzaimi Piee	11 November 1993 (age 32)	2	0	(Football Association of Malaysia) Negeri Sembilan
8	MF	Safiq Rahim	5 July 1987 (age 38)	77	15	(Football Association of Malaysia) Johor Darul Ta'zim
14	MF	Syamer Kutty Abba	1 November 1997 (age 28)	24	0	(Football Association of Malaysia) Johor Darul Ta'zim
29	MF	Nor Azam Azih	3 January 1995 (age 31)	17	0	(Football Association of Malaysia) Sri Pahang
15	MF	Kogileswaran Raj	21 September 1998 (age 27)	8	2	(Football Association of Malaysia) Petaling Jaya City
10	MF	Liridon Krasniqi	1 January 1992 (age 34)	6	1	(All India Football Federation) Odisha
25	MF	Zhafri Yahya	25 September 1994 (age 31)	0	0	(Football Association of Malaysia) Kuala Lumpur City
11	FW	Safawi Rasid	5 March 1997 (age 29)	37	15	(Football Association of Malaysia) Johor Darul Ta'zim
19	FW	Akhyar Rashid	1 May 1999 (age 26)	28	7	(Football Association of Malaysia) Johor Darul Ta'zim
20	FW	Syafiq Ahmad	28 June 1995 (age 30)	24	8	(Football Association of Malaysia) Kedah Darul Aman
13	FW	Mohamadou Sumareh	20 September 1994 (age 31)	24	6	(Football Association of Malaysia) Johor Darul Ta'zim
18	FW	Luqman Hakim Shamsudin	5 March 2002 (age 24)	9	0	(Royal Belgian Football Association) Kortrijk
12	FW	Arif Aiman Hanapi	4 May 2002 (age 23)	9	0	(Football Association of Malaysia) Johor Darul Ta'zim
17	FW	Faisal Halim	7 January 1998 (age 28)	5	0	(Football Association of Malaysia) Terengganu
27	FW	Ramadhan Saifullah	9 December 2000 (age 25)	0	0	(Football Association of Malaysia) Johor Darul Ta'zim

== Head-to-head records ==
Opponents	Games played	Won	Drawn*	Lost	Goals for	Goals against	Goals difference
Albirex Niigata Singapore	1	1	0	0	3	0	+3
(England) Arsenal	5	1	1	3	4	9	−5
(England) Aston Villa	1	0	0	1	0	4	−4
(Spain) Barcelona	1	0	0	1	1	3	−2
(England) Chelsea	3	0	0	3	1	7	−6
(Thailand) Chonburi	1	0	1	0	0	0	0
(England) Everton	2	0	1	1	0	1	−1
(Brazil) Flamengo XI	1	0	1	0	1	1	0
Indonesia	1	1	0	0	6	0	+6
(England) Liverpool	2	0	1	1	4	7	−3
(England) Manchester City	1	0	0	1	1	3	−2
(England) Manchester United	3	0	0	3	2	11	−9
(England) Newcastle United	2	0	0	2	2	6	−4
(England) Norwich City	1	0	0	1	0	1	−1
(England) Nottingham Forest	1	0	0	1	0	3	−3
(Japan) Shimizu S-Pulse	1	0	0	1	0	2	−2
(Japan) Shonan Bellmare	1	0	0	1	0	5	−5
(Japan) Tokyo Verdy	1	0	0	1	0	5	−5

*Denotes draws include knockout matches decided on penalty kicks.

== See also ==
- ASEAN All-Stars
- Indonesia XI
- Singapore Selection XI
