= R. Arumugam =

Malaysian footballer

Datuk Arumugam Rengasamy AMN PJN
Personal information
- Full name: Arumugam a/l Rengasamy
- Date of birth: 31 January 1953
- Place of birth: Port Klang, Selangor, Federation of Malaya
- Date of death: 18 December 1988 (aged 35)
- Place of death: Petaling Jaya, Selangor, Malaysia
- Position: Goalkeeper

Senior career*
Years	Team	Apps	(Gls)
1971–1988	Selangor		

International career^{‡}
1973–1986	Malaysia	142	(0)
Medal record
Men's football
Representing Malaysia
Southeast Asian Games
Gold medal – first place	1977 Malaysia	Team
Gold medal – first place	1979 Indonesia	Team
Silver medal – second place	1981 Philippines	Team
Bronze medal – third place	1973 Singapore	Team
Bronze medal – third place	1983 Singapore	Team
Bronze medal – third place	1985 Bangkok	Team
- * Club domestic league appearances and goals ‡ National team caps and goals as of 25 March 2021

Datuk Arumugam Rengasamy (also known as Spiderman) was a Malaysian international football player from Selangor. His long arms and difficult saves earned him the nickname "Spiderman". He was inducted into the FIFA Century Club in May 2021.

== Career ==
He made his debut for Selangor FA when he was 18 years old in the Burnley Cup youth competition in 1971. He represented Selangor FA in the Malaysia Cup tournament from 1972 to 1988, a period during which Selangor FA won the Malaysia Cup eight times.

== International ==
R. Arumugam was called up to the Malaysian national football team in 1973 for the World Cup qualifying round matches in Seoul, South Korea. During his time with the national team, Malaysia won the Merdeka Tournament in 1973, 1974, 1976, 1979 and 1986. He also represented Malaysia in the 1973, 1975, 1977, 1979, 1981, 1983 and 1985 Sea Games. He won a bronze medal with the national team during the 1974 Asian Games in Tehran. Malaysia also qualified for the 1980 Moscow Olympic Games, but Malaysia decided to boycott the Games. R. Arumugam earned 196 caps (not all A class international matches), 142 matches is against full national team. He retired during the 1986 Asian Games.

In 2022, IFFHS list him on their list of the top 25 goalkeepers with most clean-sheets in national team which he had a total of 50 clean-sheets and the first Southeast Asia player to do so.

== After retirement ==
In 1983, he formed his own club, Starbrite SC, as part of his personal contribution to the youngsters in his housing area.

== Death and legacy ==
R. Arumugam died in a car accident at Federal Highway near Petaling Jaya on 18 December 1988. His wife, Maria Selvie survived the incident with his two daughters, Subha Arumugam and Rubha Arumugam.

In recognition of his services to both state and nation, the Football Association of Selangor and Public Bank, where Arumugam had been employed, started a trust fund in his name on 5 January 1989. On 4 June 2011, Yang Dipertuan Agong posthumously awarded him the Panglima Jasa Negara (PJN), which carries the title "Datuk".

The character of Muthu Kumar in Ola Bola, a 2016 film chronicling the Malaysian national team's road to the 1980 Olympic qualifiers, was based on Arumugam.

== Honours ==
=== Club ===
F.A. Selangor

- Malaysian League (1):

Champion: 1984

- Malaysia Cup (8):

Winner: 1973, 1975, 1976, 1979, 1981, 1982, 1984, 1986

- Malaysia Charity Shield (2):

Winner: 1985, 1987

=== International ===
- Merdeka Tournament (5)

Winners: 1973, 1974, 1976, 1979, 1986

- SEA Games (2)

Winners: 1977, 1979
Runners-up: 1975, 1981
Bronze Medal: 1973, 1983, 1985

- Asian Games

Bronze Medal: 1974

=== Individual ===
- AFC Asian All Stars: 1982, 1985
- AFC Century Club Awards 1999
- OCM Hall of Fame 2004
- Ex-State & Ex-National Footballers Association of Malaysia Honour: 2011
- Goal.com The best Malaysia XI of all time: 2020

=== Records ===
- Malaysia national football team all-time most clean-sheets: 50
- Southeast Asia all-time most clean-sheets in national team: 50
- The first Asian footballers to reach 50 clean-sheets in national team: (1973–1986)

=== Orders ===
- Malaysia
  - Member of the Order of the Defender of the Realm (AMN) (1980)
  - Commander of the Order of Meritorious Service (PJN) – Datuk (2011–posthumously)

== See also ==
- List of men's footballers with 100 or more international caps
