= Abdah Alif =

Malaysian footballer

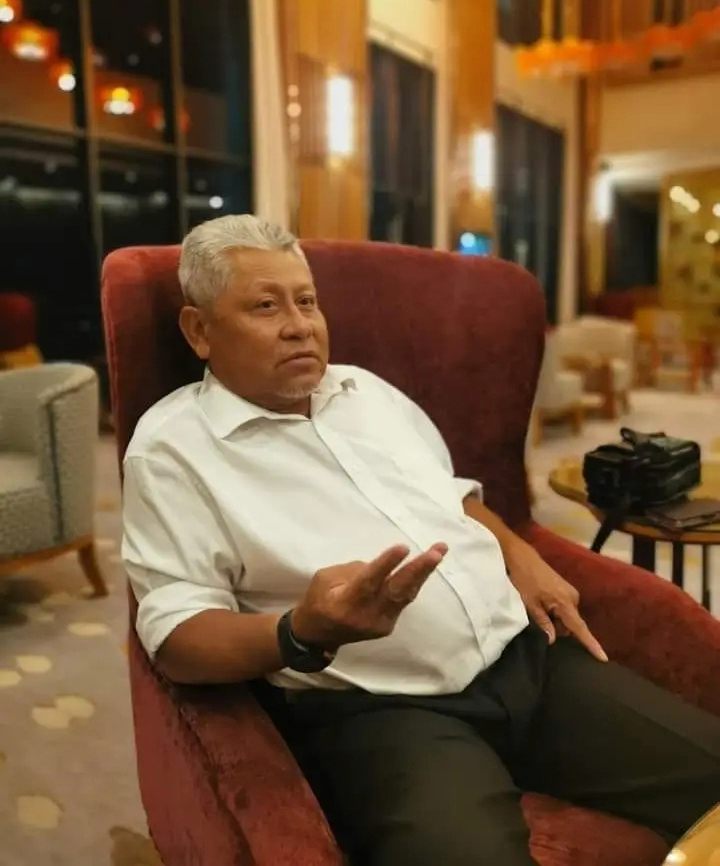
- Abdah Alif in 2021

Personal information
- Full name: Mohd Abdah Bin Mohd Alif
- Date of birth: 31 August 1954 (age 72)
- Place of birth: Terengganu, Malaysia
- Position: Midfielder

Youth career
- 1972–1973: Terengganu

Senior career*
Years	Team	Apps	(Gls)
1974–1977	Terengganu		
1978–1984	Pahang		

International career
1975–1980	Malaysia	60	(13)
Medal record
Men's football
Representing Malaysia
SEA Games
Gold medal – first place	1977 Kuala Lumpur	Team
Gold medal – first place	1979 Jakarta	Team
- * Club domestic league appearances and goals

Abdah Alif (born 31 August 1954) is a Malaysian former footballer who played as a midfielder for Terengganu, Pahang and the Malaysia national team.

== Career overview ==
Abdah was born in Terengganu. He played for Terengganu and Pahang in the Malaysia Cup between the 1970s to 1980s. He was a squad player for Malaysia national team in the 1980 AFC Asian Cup. He scoring in the 2–0 win against the UAE in the group stage.

He also part of the Malaysian team that qualified to the 1980 Olympic games Moscow which Malaysia boycotted. Malaysia won the play-off against South Korea with a 2–1 score in the Merdeka Stadium.

In total, Abdah earned 60 international caps and scored 13 international goals for Malaysia.

== Personal life ==
His brothers Yunus Alif and Najib Alif were also footballers, with Yunus also played with Malaysia.

== Career statistics ==
Scores and results list Malaysia's goal tally first, score column indicates score after each Abdah goal.

List of international goals scored by Abdah Alif
No.	Date	Venue	Opponent	Score	Result	Competition
1	14 August 1976	Kuala Lumpur, Malaysia	Indonesia		7–1	1974 Merdeka Tournament
2	19 September 1976	Seoul, South Korea	India		4–0	1976 Korea President Cup
3	18 December 1976	Bangkok, Thailand	Bangladesh		6–0	1976 Thailand Kings Cup
4	18 July 1977	Kuala Lumpur	Thailand		3–0	1977 Merdeka Tournament
5	19 November 1977	Kuala Lumpur, Malaysia	Indonesia		1–2	1977 SEA Games
6	12 July 1978	Kuala Lumpur, Malaysia	South Korea		1–3	1978 Merdeka Tournament
7	21 July 1978	Kuala Lumpur, Malaysia	Japan		4–1	1978 Merdeka Tournament
8	23 July 1978	Kuala Lumpur, Malaysia	Syria		5–2	1978 Merdeka Tournament
9	23 July 1978	Kuala Lumpur, Malaysia	Syria		5–2	1978 Merdeka Tournament
10	9 September 1978	Seoul, South Korea	Bahrain		2–1	1978 Korea President Cup
11	9 September 1978	Seoul, South Korea	Bahrain		2–1	1978 Korea President Cup
12	2 April 1980	Kuala Lumpur, Malaysia	Philippines		8–0	1980 Olympics Qualifications
13	20 September 1980	Kuwait City, Kuwait	United Arab Emirates		2–0	1980 AFC Asian Cup

== Honours ==
Terengganu

- Malaysia Kings Gold Cup: 1977

Pahang

- Malaysia Cup: 1983
- Malaysia Kings Gold Cup: 1980

Malaysia

- SEA Games: 1977, 1979
- Pestabola Merdeka: 1976, 1979
- King's Cup: 1976
