= Wang Feng (footballer) =

Chinese footballer

Personal information
- Date of birth: 1956 (age 69–70)
- Place of birth: Guangxi, China
- Position: Forward

Senior career*
| Years | Team | Apps | (Gls) |
| 1980–1982 | Guangxi FC | | |

International career
| 1978–1982 | China | 18 | (2) |
- * Club domestic league appearances and goals

Wang Feng (Chinese: 王峰; pinyin: Wáng Fēng, born 1956 in Guangxi) is a Chinese former footballer who played as a forward for the China national football team during the 1970s and 80s.

== Career statistics ==
=== International ===
| National team | Year | Apps | Goals |
|---|---|---|---|
China
| China | 1978 | 6 | 2 |
| China | 1979 | 0 | 0 |
| China | 1980 | 6 | 0 |
| China | 1981 | 3 | 0 |
| China | 1982 | 3 | 0 |
| Total | | 18 | 2 |

=== International goals ===
Scores and results list China's goal tally first.

| No | Date | Venue | Opponent | Score | Result | Competition |
|---|---|---|---|---|---|---|
| 1. | 19 December 1978 | Thailand | Malaysia | — | 7–1 | Friendly |
| 2. | 27 December 1978 | Rizal Memorial Stadium, Manila, Philippines | Macau | — | 2–1 | 1980 AFC Asian Cup qualification |
