= Andi Lala =

Indonesian footballer (1935–1988)

Personal information
- Date of birth: 17 June 1950
- Place of birth: Bone, Indonesia
- Date of death: 1 November 2004 (aged 54)
- Place of death: Jakarta, Indonesia

Youth career
- –1970: Persija Jakarta

Senior career*
Years	Team	Apps	(Gls)
1970–1982	Persija Jakarta	40	(20)
1970–1972	→ PS Jayakarta (loan)		

International career
1971–1979	Indonesia	30	(9)
- * Club domestic league appearances and goals

Andi Lala (17 June 1950 – 1 November 2004) was an Indonesian professional football player and manager, who played as a left winger. He has represented the Indonesia national team in various tournaments, including the 1977 SEA Games in Kuala Lumpur, Malaysia. He also led Persija Jakarta to win the Perserikatan in 1972, 1975, and 1977. He was also part of the club when Persija won the Quoc Khanh Cup in South Vietnam in 1973.

On 1 November 2004, Andi died at the age of 54 after suffering a heart attack at his residence in Kebon Jeruk, West Jakarta.

== Career statistics ==
=== International ===
Scores and results list Indonesia's goal tally first, score column indicates score after each Andi goal.

List of international goals scored by Andi Lala
No.	Date	Venue	Opponent	Score	Result	Competition
1	28 May 1971	Suphachalasai Stadium, Bangkok, Thailand	Brunei	3–0	9–0	1972 AFC Asian Cup qualification
2	28 May 1971	Suphachalasai Stadium, Bangkok, Thailand	Brunei	6–0	9–0	1972 AFC Asian Cup qualification
3	28 May 1971	Suphachalasai Stadium, Bangkok, Thailand	Brunei	7–0	9–0	1972 AFC Asian Cup qualification
4	26 July 1974	Merdeka Stadium, Kuala Lumpur, Malaysia	Thailand	1–2	1–2	1974 Merdeka Tournament
5	28 July 1974	Merdeka Stadium, Kuala Lumpur, Malaysia	Singapore	2–0	5–0	1974 Merdeka Tournament
6	9 August 1975	Merdeka Stadium, Kuala Lumpur, Malaysia	Thailand	2–0	2–1	1975 Merdeka Tournament
7	9 March 1977	National Stadium, Kallang, Singapore	Singapore	3–0	4–0	1978 FIFA World Cup qualification
8	1 May 1979	Suphachalasai Stadium, Bangkok, Thailand	Thailand	1–1	1–3	1980 AFC Asian Cup qualification
9	7 May 1979	Suphachalasai Stadium, Bangkok, Thailand	North Korea	1–2	1–3	1980 AFC Asian Cup qualification

== Honours ==
Persija

- Perserikatan: 1971–73, 1973–75, 1978–79; runner-up: 1975–78

Indonesia

- Jakarta Anniversary Tournament runner-up: 1973, 1974, 1978
