= Tatinho =

Brazilian footballer

Personal information
- Full name: Renato Piau de Sá
- Date of birth: 19 December 1992 (age 33)
- Place of birth: Dracena, Brazil
- Height: 1.73 m (5 ft 8 in)
- Position: Forward

Team information
- Current team: Jaraguá Futsal

Senior career*
Years	Team	Apps	(Gls)
2008–2010	Oeste Paulista		
2011–2013	PSTC		
2012	→ Ventforet Kofu (loan)	3	(0)
2015–2019	Dracena Futsal		
2020	ADC Intelli		
2021–2023	Corinthians Futsal		
2023–2025	Sporting CP Futsal		
2025–	Jaraguá Futsal		
- * Club domestic league appearances and goals

Renato Piau de Sá, known professionally as Tatinho, (born 19 December 1992) is a Brazilian futsal player who plays for Jaraguá Futsal.

== Career ==
Tatinho was formerly a professional footballer who played as a forward. After playing for Ventforet Kofu in Japan, he had problems with agents and became disillusioned with football, not playing football for a few years before getting into futsal.

On 3 January 2024, Tatinho joined Sporting CP. During his time at the club, he won the Portuguese League and Portuguese League Cup.

On 18 February 2025, Tatinho joined Jaraguá Futsal for the 2025 season.

== Career statistics ==
Appearances and goals by club, season and competition
Club	Season	League			National cup (Note: Includes Emperor's Cup.)		Total	
Club	Season	Division	Apps	Goals	Apps	Goals	Apps	Goals
Ventforet Kofu	2012	J2 League	3	0				
Total			3	0	0	0	3	0
