= Kevork Mardikian =

Syrian footballer (born 1954)

Personal information
- Full name: Kevork Mardikian
- Date of birth: 14 July 1954 (age 72)
- Place of birth: Latakia, Syria
- Height: 1.75 m (5 ft 9 in)
- Position: Midfielder

Senior career*
Years	Team	Apps	(Gls)
1971–1976	Hutteen		
1976–1986	Al-Jaish		

International career
1979–1985	Syria	13	(1)

Managerial career
- 1988: Homenetmen
- 1989: Hutteen
- 1997: Syria
- Syria U-20
- Syria U-17
- * Club domestic league appearances and goals

Kevork Mardikian (alternative spelling Kifork Mardekyan Arabic: كِيْفُورك مَاردِيْكيَان Armenian: Գէորգ Մարտիկեան born in Latakia, Syria on 14 July 1954) is a former Syrian football midfielder of Armenian descent. He captained the Syrian national team between 1979 and 1985.

== Career ==
Mardikian started his career at Hutteen, before joining Al-Jaish in 1976, due to mandatory military service.

He played for Syria in the 1980 Asian Cup, 1984 Asian Cup and the 1980 Moscow Olympics. He has been described as "one of the best Syrian footballers of all time".

As a coach, Mardikian has coached Syria in various youth teams such as Syria U-20 (successful qualification to the 2005 FIFA World Youth Championship) and Syria U-17. He also coached in the United Arab Emirates, Lebanese side Homenetmen, and his former club Hutteen, where he led the latter to the Syrian Cup final in 1998–99.

His son Mardik Mardikian is also a footballer.
