= James Wong Chye Fook =

Malaysian footballer

James Wong
Personal information
- Full name: James Wong Chye Fook
- Date of birth: 26 June 1953 (age 73)
- Place of birth: Sabah, Malaysia
- Height: 1.85 m (6 ft 1 in)
- Positions: Forward; goalkeeper

Youth career
- 1968: Tanjung Aru Youth
- 1969–1970: Kota Kinabalu Youth
- 1969–1970: Sabah FA

Senior career*
Years	Team	Apps	(Gls)
1970–1974	Sabah		
1974–1976	Hakoah Sydney		
1976–1985	Sabah		

International career
1971–1973	Malaysia U-20		
1972–1981	Malaysia	36	(23)
- * Club domestic league appearances and goals

Datuk James Wong Chye Fook (born 26 June 1953) is a Malaysian former footballer who is a striker for Malaysian national football team and Sabah. He also played as a goalkeeper for the Malaysia youth team in the 1971 AFC Youth Championship. He was known as King James by the local fans.

== Career overview ==
Wong was the first Sabahan to represent Malaysia in 1971. In 1974, He went Down Under to join Hakoah Sydney, the Australian club, at the invitation of former Malaysian head coach, Dave MacLaren. He played professionally for the club in New South Wales Premier League for two years. Wong is well-known for his physical and finishing touch. His partnership with Hassan Sani produced many memorable goals for Sabah and Malaysia. The most memorable one was in the 1980 Olympic games qualification. In the qualification, Malaysia won the play-off against South Korea with a 2–1 score at the Merdeka Stadium. Wong himself scored the winning goal off a pass from Hassan. Unfortunately, Malaysia did not participate after joining the US-led boycott against the Soviet Union for its role in supporting the Democratic Republic of Afghanistan against the Islamic Unity of Afghanistan Mujahideen. Wong also appeared for Malaysia in six qualifying matches of the FIFA World Cup.

== Further career ==
In 2015, he together with Hassan was appointed as one of the members for the management team of Sabah FA.

== Career statistics ==
=== International goals ===
Scores and results list Malaysia's goal tally first.

#	Date	Venue	Opponent	Score	Result	Competition
1.	5 June 1972	Jakarta, Indonesia	Sri Lanka		3–0	1972 Jakarta Anniversary Tournament
2	18 December 1976	Bangkok, Thailand	Bangladesh		6-0	1976 King's Cup
3	18 December 1976	Bangkok, Thailand	Bangladesh		6-0	1976 King's Cup
4	18 December 1976	Bangkok, Thailand	Bangladesh		6-0	1976 King's Cup
5	1 March 1977	Singapore	Thailand		6-4	1978 FIFA World Cup qualification (AFC and OFC)
6	1 March 1977	Singapore	Thailand		6-4	1978 FIFA World Cup qualification (AFC and OFC)
7	1 March 1977	Singapore	Thailand		6-4	1978 FIFA World Cup qualification (AFC and OFC)
8	1 March 1977	Singapore	Thailand		6-4	1978 FIFA World Cup qualification (AFC and OFC)
9	23 November 1977	Kuala Lumpur, Malaysia	Brunei		7-0	1977 SEA Games
10	25 November 1977	Kuala Lumpur, Malaysia	Burma		9-1	1977 SEA Games
11	14 July 1978	Kuala Lumpur, Malaysia	Singapore		6-0	1978 Merdeka Tournament
12	14 July 1978	Kuala Lumpur, Malaysia	Singapore		6-0	1978 Merdeka Tournament
13	14 July 1978	Kuala Lumpur, Malaysia	Singapore		6-0	1978 Merdeka Tournament
14	16 July 1977	Kuala Lumpur, Malaysia	Thailand		2-0	1978 Merdeka Tournament
15	2 May 1979	Bangkok, Thailand	Sri Lanka		3-1	1980 AFC Asian Cup qualification
16	5 May 1979	Bangkok, Thailand	Indonesia		4-1	1980 AFC Asian Cup qualification
17	16 March 1980	Kuala Lumpur, Malaysia	China		3-1	Friendly Match
18	25 March 1980	Kuala Lumpur, Malaysia	South Korea		3-0	1980 Summer Olympics - Asian Qualifiers
19	27 March 1980	Kuala Lumpur, Malaysia	Brunei		3-1	1980 Summer Olympics - Asian Qualifiers
20	27 March 1980	Kuala Lumpur, Malaysia	Brunei		3-1	1980 Summer Olympics - Asian Qualifiers
21	30 March 1980	Kuala Lumpur, Malaysia	Japan		1-1	1980 Summer Olympics - Asian Qualifiers
22	6 April 1980	Kuala Lumpur, Malaysia	South Korea		2-1	1980 Summer Olympics - Asian Qualifiers
23	21 April 1981	Kuwait City	South Korea		1-2	1982 FIFA World Cup qualification (AFC and OFC)

== Honours ==
=== Club ===
Sabah Youth

- Burnley Cup: 1969

Sabah

- Malaysian League Tournament runner-up: 1979
- Borneo Cup: 1970, 1971, 1972, 1977, 1978, 1979, 1980

=== International ===
- SEA Games: 1977, 1979
- King's Cup: 1976

=== Individual ===
- Borneo Cup top scorer: 1970, 1972, 1977, 1980
- National Day Award - Outstanding achievement of all time: 2012
- Goal.com The best Malaysia XI of all time: 2020

=== Orders ===
- Sabah
  - Commander of the Order of Kinabalu (PGDK) – Datuk (2016)
