= Football at the 1980 Summer Olympics – Men's Asian Qualifiers =

Men's Football Asian Qualifier games for the 1980 Summer Olympics

This page provides the summaries of the matches of the qualifying tournaments divided into three groups, two of six teams and one of five teams. The winners and runners-up of each group met in a play-off match to qualify for the 1980 Summer Olympics tournament held in Moscow. Three teams qualified – Kuwait, Malaysia and Iran. However, due to the American-led political boycott, Malaysia and Iran did not enter the Final Tournament and were replaced by Iraq and Syria respectively.

== Qualifying tournaments ==
=== Group 1 ===
The qualifying tournament of group 1 was held in Iraq, 5 teams participated.

==== Round 1 ====
Team	Pld	W	D	L	GF	GA	GD	Pts
Iraq	4	3	1	0	8	0	+8	7
Kuwait	4	3	1	0	7	1	+6	7
Syria	4	2	0	2	4	3	+1	4
South Yemen	4	1	0	3	4	11	−7	2
Jordan	4	0	0	4	1	9	−8	0

17 March 1980

Iraq	3–0	South Yemen
Saeed 3', 82'; Khudhair 61'

Al-Shaab Stadium, Baghdad

17 March 1980

Kuwait	1–0	Syria

Al-Shaab Stadium, Baghdad

19 March 1980

Iraq	4–0	Jordan
Ahmed 18', 52'; Jassim 62'; Saeed 75'

Al-Shaab Stadium, Baghdad

19 March 1980

Syria	2–1	South Yemen

Al-Shaab Stadium, Baghdad

22 March 1980

Kuwait	5–1	South Yemen

Al-Shaab Stadium, Baghdad

22 March 1980

Syria	2–0	Jordan

Al-Shaab Stadium, Baghdad

26 March 1980

Iraq	0–0	Kuwait

Al-Shaab Stadium, Baghdad

26 March 1980

South Yemen	2–1	Jordan

Al-Shaab Stadium, Baghdad

29 March 1980

Iraq	1–0	Syria
Ashraf 70'

Al-Shaab Stadium, Baghdad

29 March 1980

Kuwait	1–0	Jordan

Al-Shaab Stadium, Baghdad

==== Playoff match ====
Team 1	Agg.	Team 2
Iraq	2–3	Kuwait

31 March 1980

Iraq	2–3	Kuwait
Ashraf 6', 44'		Yaqoub 69' (pen.), 82'; Al-Ghanim 79'

Al-Shaab Stadium, Baghdad
Attendance: 65,000

Kuwait won the tournament and qualified for the 1980 Summer Olympics football tournament.

=== Group 2 ===
The qualifying tournament of group 2 was held in Malaysia, 6 teams participated.

==== Round 1 ====
Team	Pld	W	D	L	GF	GA	GD	Pts
Malaysia	5	4	1	0	21	3	+18	9
South Korea	5	4	0	1	15	4	+11	8
Japan	5	3	1	1	16	5	+11	7
Brunei	5	2	0	3	7	10	−3	4
Indonesia	5	1	0	4	7	12	−5	2
Philippines	5	0	0	5	0	32	−32	0

21 March 1980

Malaysia	6–1	Indonesia

Kuala Lumpur
22 March 1980

South Korea	3–1	Japan

Kuala Lumpur

22 March 1980

Indonesia	4–0	Philippines

Kuala Lumpur

24 March 1980

Japan	10–0	Philippines

Kuala Lumpur

25 March 1980

Malaysia	3–0	South Korea

Kuala Lumpur

25 March 1980

Brunei	2–0	Philippines

Kuala Lumpur

27 March 1980

South Korea	8–0	Philippines

Kuala Lumpur

March 1980

Malaysia	3–1	Brunei

Kuala Lumpur

28 March 1980

Japan	2–0	Indonesia

Kuala Lumpur

March 1980

Brunei	3–2	Indonesia

Kuala Lumpur

30 March 1980

Malaysia	1–1	Japan

Kuala Lumpur

31 March 1980

South Korea	3–0	Brunei

Kuala Lumpur

2 April 1980

Japan	2–1	Brunei

Kuala Lumpur

3 April 1980

Malaysia	8–0	Philippines

Kuala Lumpur

3 April 1980

South Korea	1–0	Indonesia

Kuala Lumpur

==== Playoff match ====
Team 1	Agg.	Team 2
Malaysia	2–1	South Korea

6 April 1980
20:00

Malaysia	2 – 1	South Korea
Bakri Ibni 12'; James Wong 85'		Kim Kang-nam 58'

Merdeka Stadium, Kuala Lumpur
Attendance: 50,000
Referee: Ali Albannai Abdulwahab (Kuwait)

Malaysia won the tournament and qualified for the 1980 Summer Olympics football tournament.

Note: Due to the American-led political boycott, Malaysia who qualified did not enter the Final Tournament and were replaced by Iraq.

=== Group 3 ===
The qualifying tournament of group 3 was held in Singapore, 6 teams participated.

==== Round 1 ====
Team	Pld	W	D	L	GF	GA	GD	Pts
Iran	5	3	2	0	18	2	+16	8
Singapore	5	4	0	1	8	4	+4	8
China	5	2	2	1	11	4	+7	6
North Korea	5	2	2	1	11	5	+6	6
India	5	1	0	4	5	6	−1	2
Sri Lanka	5	0	0	5	0	32	−32	0
Burma	0	0	0	0	0	0	0	0

23 February 1980

Singapore	3–0	Sri Lanka

Singapore

24 February 1980

China	1–0	India

Singapore

25 February 1980

Iran	0–0	North Korea

Singapore

26 February 1980

Singapore	1–0	India

Singapore

27 February 1980

Iran	2–2	China

Singapore

28 February 1980

North Korea	7–0	Sri Lanka

Singapore

1 March 1980

Iran	3–0	Singapore

Singapore

2 March 1980

China	1–1	North Korea

Singapore

3 March 1980

India	4–0	Sri Lanka

Singapore

4 March 1980

Singapore	3–1	North Korea

Singapore

5 March 1980

China	7–0	Sri Lanka

Singapore

7 March 1980

Iran	2–0	India

Singapore

8 March 1980

Singapore	1–0	China

Singapore

9 March 1980

Iran	11–0	Sri Lanka

Singapore

10 March 1980

North Korea	2–1	India

Singapore

==== Playoff match ====
Team 1	Agg.	Team 2
Singapore	0–4	Iran

12 March 1980

Singapore	0 – 4	Iran
		Fariba 21'; Faraki 39', 59'; Barzegari 56'

National Stadium, Singapore
Attendance: 75,000

Iran won the tournament and qualified for the 1980 Summer Olympics football tournament.

Note: Due to the American-led political boycott, Iran who qualified did not enter the Final Tournament and were replaced by Syria.
