= Borneo Cup =

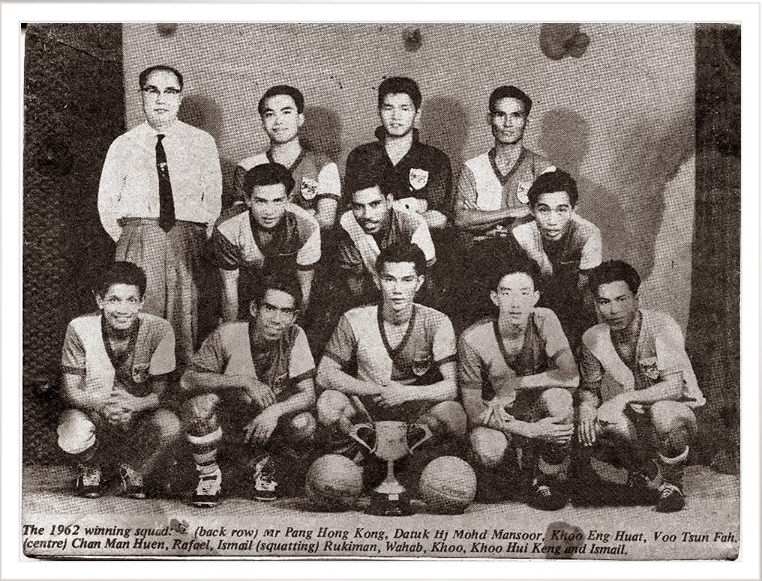
- The winner of the first season of Borneo Cup in 1962, North Borneo football team.
- Founded: 1962
- Abolished: 1989
- Region: East Malaysia and Brunei
- Last champions: Sarawak (7th title)
- Most championships: Sabah (13 titles)

Borneo Cup (Malay: Piala Borneo) was a football tournament held in East Malaysia and Brunei. The tournament was played in Borneo since the 1950s, perhaps earlier. Before the establishment of Malaysia on 16 September 1963, the tournament was contested by three national teams, North Borneo, Sarawak and Brunei. After North Borneo and Sarawak formed Malaysia together with Malaya and Singapore, it competed as states of Malaysia.

In 1977, the tournament champions Sabah qualify for the Malaysia Cup. The following year, the tournament served as the Malaysia Cup east zone qualifying round. In the 2010s, there is an effort to revive the Cup by the Sabah Football Association (SAFA), but with the absence of sponsors and the tight schedule of the Brunei team in the S.League became a major barrier to the efforts.

== History ==
The Borneo Football Championship was first played by British Crown colony officials who took over the management of British North Borneo from the North Borneo Chartered Company in 1946 after the Second World War. It was then officially called the Borneo Cup. The oldest football club in Borneo, Kuching Wanderers FC, were the pioneers of this tournament in the era of British rule. Sabah, known as North Borneo at that time, became the inaugural champion in 1962. The Sabah team won another 12 titles from 23 Borneo Cup editions until 1988. Sarawak won seven times while Brunei won only three times. Sabah, who became the Borneo Cup champion in 1977, was the first team from Borneo Island to compete in the Malaysia Cup. The Football Association of Malaysia (FAM) also invited Sarawak and Brunei to compete in the Burnley Cup (later known as the President's Cup). In 1989, the Borneo Cup was abolished after the failure of agreement with FAM to join the Semi-Pro League.

== Champions ==
Year	Champions
1962	North Borneo
1963	Sabah
1964	Sabah
1965	Sarawak
1966	Sarawak
1967	Sabah
1968	Brunei
1969	Sarawak
1970	Sabah
1971	Sabah
1972	Sabah
1973–76	No competition
1977	Sabah
1978	Sabah
1979	Sabah
1980	Sabah
1981	Brunei
1982	Sarawak
1983	Sarawak
1984	Sabah
1985	Sabah
1986	Sarawak
1987	Brunei
1988	Sarawak
1989	not held
