= Football at the 1977 SEA Games =

- Venue: 1 (in 1 host city)
- Dates: 19 November - 26 November 1977
- Nations: 7

Football was contested as part of the programme for the 1977 Southeast Asian Games which was hosted in Kuala Lumpur, Malaysia from 19 to 26 November 1977. It was the ninth edition of the men's football tournament at the multi-sport event organised by the SEA Games Federation Committee.

The football tournament began with the first matches of the group stage on 19 November 1977 and ended with the gold medal match on 26 November 1977. Defending champions Thailand and hosts Malaysia contested the final. Malaysia defeated Thailand 2–0 to win the gold medal. The bronze medal was awarded to Burma after Indonesia did not take part in the bronze medal match.

== Background ==
Football had been part of the Southeast Asian Games programme following the debut of the men's competition at the inaugural 1959 SEAP Games in Thailand. Thailand were the defending champions after defeating Malaysia 2–1 in the gold medal match at the previous edition in 1975. Burma were the most successful team having won the gold medal five times previously.

== Format ==
In total, seven teams took part in the competition. They were drawn into two single round robin groups – one of four teams and one of three teams. The winners and runners-up would then contest the semi-finals which would decide the teams contesting the gold and bronze medal matches.

=== Participants ===
- Brunei
- Burma
- Indonesia
- Malaysia
- Philippines
- Singapore
- Thailand

== Venue ==
Matches were played at the Stadium Merdeka in Kuala Lumpur, Malaysia.

Kuala Lumpur is located in Malaysia	Kuala Lumpur
Kuala Lumpur is located in Malaysia	Stadium Merdeka
Kuala Lumpur is located in Malaysia	Capacity: 25,000

== Group stage ==
=== Group A ===
Indonesia and Malaysia advanced to the semi-finals.

==== Table ====
Pos	Team	Pld	W	D	L	GF	GA	GD	Pts	Qualification
1	Indonesia	3	2	1	0	7	2	+5	5	Advance to semi-finals
2	Malaysia	3	2	0	1	13	2	+11	4	Advance to semi-finals
3	Philippines	3	1	1	1	5	7	−2	3	
4	Brunei	3	0	0	3	1	15	−14	0	

==== Matches ====
19 November 1977

Malaysia	1–2	Indonesia
Alif 88'		Idris 28'; Ismanto 82'

Stadium Merdeka, Kuala Lumpur

20 November 1977

Philippines	4–1	Brunei
Benavidez 44', 52', 68', 70'		Razak 10'

Stadium Merdeka, Kuala Lumpur

21 November 1977

Malaysia	5–0	Philippines
Ibni 8'; Dahari (x2); Bakar 56'; Rashid

Stadium Merdeka, Kuala Lumpur
Referee: Vijit Getkeaw (Thailand)

22 November 1977

Indonesia	4–0	Brunei
Idris (x2); Lala (x2)

Stadium Merdeka, Kuala Lumpur

23 November 1977

Philippines	1–1	Indonesia
Veloso 90'		Lala 30'

Stadium Merdeka, Kuala Lumpur
23 November 1977

Malaysia	7–0	Brunei
Dahari 1'; Yaakub 35', 60'; Unknown 57' (o.g.); Rashid 59'; Wong 76'; Singh 90'

Stadium Merdeka, Kuala Lumpur

=== Group B ===
Burma and Thailand advanced to the semi-finals.

==== Table ====
Pos	Team	Pld	W	D	L	GF	GA	GD	Pts	Qualification
1	Burma	2	2	0	0	8	1	+7	4	Advance to semi-finals
2	Thailand	2	1	0	1	2	3	−1	2	Advance to semi-finals
3	Singapore	2	0	0	2	1	7	−6	0	

==== Matches ====
20 November 1977

Thailand	2–0	Singapore
Chaiyabutr 32'; Naphatalung 72'

Stadium Merdeka, Kuala Lumpur

21 November 1977

Burma	5–1	Singapore
Than Win 17'; Maung Nyint Aung 40'; Aye Maung 50' (pen.); Maung Tin Win 67'; Soe Naing 86'		Ho Kwang Hock 73'

Stadium Merdeka, Kuala Lumpur
Attendance: 10,000

22 November 1977

Thailand	0–3	Burma
		Aye Maung 15'; Soe Naing 35'; Maung Maung Tin 74'

Stadium Merdeka, Kuala Lumpur

== Semi-finals ==
Malaysia defeated Burma to advance to the gold medal match. The match between Indonesia and Thailand was abandoned while tied at 1–1 after 60 minutes as a result of an all-in brawl. The Disciplinary Committee found Indonesia guilty of violent conduct and awarded the match to Thailand.

25 November 1977

Malaysia	9–1	Burma
Wong 2'; Dahari 8', 29' (pen.), 39', 86', 88'; Bakar 56', 62'; Ibni 83'		Aye Maung 42' (pen.)

Stadium Merdeka, Kuala Lumpur

25 November 1977

Indonesia	1–1	Thailand

Stadium Merdeka, Kuala Lumpur
Referee: Othman Omar (Malaysia)

== Bronze medal match ==
The bronze medal match was not played as Indonesia failed to arrive for the match. The referee waited 15 minutes after the kick-off time before calling the game and referring the matter to the Technical Committee. The bronze medal was subsequently awarded to Burma.

26 November 1977

Burma	Abandoned	Indonesia

Stadium Merdeka, Kuala Lumpur

== Gold medal match ==
Malaysia defeated Thailand to win the gold medal.

26 November 1977
16:00 (UTC+8)

Malaysia	2–0	Thailand
Ibni 11'; Dahari 68'

Stadium Merdeka, Kuala Lumpur

== Goalscorers ==
There were 49 goals scored in 11 matches, for an average of 4.45 goals per match.

9 goals

- (Malaysia) Mokhtar Dahari

4 goals

- (Philippines) Ruben Benavidez

3 goals

- (Myanmar) Maung
- (Indonesia) Andi Lala
- (Indonesia) Iswadi Idris
- (Malaysia) Ali Bakar
- (Malaysia) Bakri Ibni

2 goals

- (Myanmar) Soe Naing
- (Malaysia) James Yaakub
- (Malaysia) James Wong
- (Malaysia) Wan Rashid

1 goal

- (Brunei) Abdul Razak
- (Myanmar) Maung Maung Tin
- (Myanmar) Maung Nyint Aung
- (Myanmar) Maung Tin Win
- (Myanmar) Than Win
- (Indonesia) Hadi Ismanto
- (Malaysia) Abdah Alif
- (Malaysia) Santokh Singh
- (Philippines) Ben Veloso
- (Singapore) Ho Kwang Hock
- (Thailand) Cherdsak Chaiyabutr
- (Thailand) Jesdaporn Naphatalung
