= Mokhtar Dahari =

Malaysian footballer (1953–1991)

Yang Berbahagia Dato' Mokhtar Dahari DSSA DIMP AMN PJK
- Mokhtar in 1975

Personal information
- Full name: Mohd Mokhtar bin Dahari
- Date of birth: 13 November 1953
- Place of birth: Setapak, Selangor, Federation of Malaya
- Date of death: 11 July 1991 (aged 37)
- Place of death: Subang Jaya, Selangor, Malaysia
- Height: 1.63 m (5 ft 4 in)
- Position: Forward

Senior career*
| Years | Team | Apps | (Gls) |
| 1972–1987 | Selangor | 375 | (177) |

International career
| 1972–1985 | Malaysia | 142 | (89) |
Medal record
Men's football
Representing Malaysia
Asian Games
| Bronze medal – third place | 1974 Tehran | Team |
SEA Games
| Gold medal – first place | 1977 Kuala Lumpur | Team |
| Gold medal – first place | 1979 Jakarta | Team |
| Silver medal – second place | 1981 Manila | Team |
| Silver medal – second place | 1975 Bangkok | Team |
| Bronze medal – third place | 1973 Singapore | Team |
- * Club domestic league appearances and goals

Dato' Mohd Mokhtar bin Dahari (Jawi: محمد مختار بن داهاري, IPA: [mʊhammad̚ moxtar bɪn daharɪ]; DSSA DIMP AMN PJK; 13 November 1953 – 11 July 1991) was a Malaysian professional footballer who played for Selangor. He is considered a legendary footballer in Malaysian history. FIFA acknowledged his 89 goals in international matches and took his team to an World Football Elo Ratings of 61 in 1977. A prolific forward, he was nicknamed Supermokh due to his playing skills and strength. Mokhtar is the all-time top scorer for the Malaysian national team.

== Early life ==
Born on 13 November 1953 at Setapak, Selangor (in present-day Kuala Lumpur), Mokhtar was the first son of Aminah Sharikan and Dahari Abeng. His father, Dahari, worked as a lorry driver but barely earned enough to support his family. His family moved to Kampung Pandan in Kuala Lumpur when Mokthar was 11 years old. Upon moving, he attended secondary school at Victoria Institution in the city and began to show interest and talent in playing football at an early age. He played for his school and later for his home state, the Selangor.

== Playing career ==
"If you're ashamed to stand by your colours, you'd better seek for another flag!"

— Mokhtar Dahari

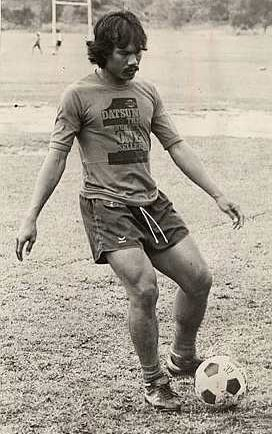
Mokhtar, an all-time top scorer with 89 goals in his 142 appearances with his national team, was recognised by FIFA as among the top international goalscorers in men's football.

Mokhtar first played for Selangor in the Burnley Cup, which they won. He was later asked to play for the club regularly where he became the top scorer in his first season playing for Selangor. He helped the club win many tournaments, mainly the Malaysia Cup with 10 titles and scoring 177 goals altogether. He also played for Kelab Sultan Sulaiman, PKNS, Talasco and Kwok Yik Bank in the FAM Cup and Selangor League. In proving his loyalty for the team, he was quoted as saying: "I live and die for Selangor". (Note: Original: "Hidup dan mati saya untuk Selangor".) Later, he was selected to play for the Malaysia national team. He was only 19 years old when he first played for the national team in an international game, with his first game against Sri Lanka in 1972. He helped Malaysia to win bronze in the 1974 Asian Games and two gold medals in the Southeast Asian Games in 1977 and 1979 respectively. He scored both goals in a 2–0 win of the Malaysia Selection against Arsenal in a friendly in 1975 that led to rumours that top clubs in England were interested in him. After the game, he had an offer from European club Real Madrid but declined to join because of his patriotism and love for his home club of Selangor. Known for his speed and accuracy, Mokhtar was named Best Asian Striker by World Soccer magazine when he was 23 years old.

Mokhtar was famous for his speed and roars of Supermokh from the crowds were common, with many of the younger generation idolising him with some trying to imitate his moves on the field. Mokhtar once scored a goal for Malaysia from the halfway line beating Joe Corrigan with a shot in a 1–1 draw against England B in 1978, dribbling past half of the opposing team coached by Bobby Robson. Also memorable was when Gordon Hill praised Mokhtar as "Hero Dahari" in Shoot! magazine in his column after the England B tour in 1978.

Mokhtar Dahari retired in May 1986 after winning the Malaysia Cup for Selangor. After the award giving ceremony, Mokhtar went to the club's president and proceeded to give him his number 10 jersey, telling the president to let the club keep the jersey for him. He came out of retirement in January 1987 to play one more season for Selangor.

== Coaching career ==
After Mokhtar started having injury problems, he became a local coach to help the younger generation become better footballers.

One of his trainees was a young Roshan Thiran, future Co-founder and CEO of Leaderonomics, who regularly speaks on his experiences playing under Mokhtar. Mokhtar asked his Selangor partner, Reduan Abdullah to write a book about his life and his career. Mokhtar also coached for Selangor at times. After his retirement, he became a player-coach for Kwong Yik Bank.

== Personal life ==
Before becoming a professional footballer, he played other sports such as badminton, sepak takraw, and hockey. Mokhtar worked for PKNS in the afternoon and played football in the evening. He earned little during his time with PKNS. He later quit PKNS and worked for Kwong Yik Bank (now known as RHB Bank) to gain better prospects for himself and his family. Mokhtar met Tengku Zarina Tengku Ibrahim through friends. After knowing her for 10 years, they finally got married on 24 February 1979. He then became the father of three children: Nur Azera (the eldest daughter), Mohd Reza (the eldest son) and Nur Arina (the youngest daughter).

== Illness and death ==
After experiencing throat issues Mokhtar was diagnosed with motor neurone disease (MND); only he and his wife knew of his illness. He travelled to London for treatment but died three years later at the Subang Jaya Medical Centre (SJMC) on 11 July 1991. It was reported that his cause of death was muscular dystrophy. He was buried at Taman Keramat Permai Muslim Cemetery in Taman Keramat, Ampang, Selangor. His cause of death was revealed for the first time in a 2010 documentary, The Untold Truth About Supermokh, broadcast on the National Geographic Channel.

== Career statistics ==
During his international career, Mokhtar scored a total of 125 goals in 167 appearances for Malaysia (including matches played against club sides, national 'B' teams and selection teams). Against other nations' national 'A' teams, he scored 89 goals in 142 appearances. This made him once the world's top scorer for men's national teams. His international 85 goals in 1980 saw him overtake Ferenc Puskás as the then-all-time highest scorer, an honour Mokhtar held for almost 24 years until Iran's Ali Daei notched his 90 international goal in 2004.

== Honours ==
Selangor

- Malaysian League: 1984
- Malaysia Cup: 1972, 1973, 1975, 1976, 1978, 1979, 1981, 1982, 1984, 1986
- Malaysia Charity Cup: 1985, 1987

Malaysia

- Pestabola Merdeka: 1973, 1974, 1976, 1979
- King's Cup: 1972, 1978
- SEA Games: 1977, 1979; silver medal: 1975, 1981; bronze medal: 1973
- Asian Games: bronze medal 1974

Individual

- SEA Games Top Scorer : 1977
- National Sportsman Award 1976
- World Soccer: The Best Asian Striker 1976
- AFC Asian All Stars: 1982
- AFC Century Club 1999
- IFFHS Men Best Malaysian Players of the Century (1901–2000)
- IFFHS Men's All Time Malaysia Dream Team: 2022
- OCM Hall of Fame: 2004
- Ex-State & Ex-National Footballers Association of Malaysia Honour: 2011
- FourFourTwo's Top 25 Malaysian Players of All Time (1st Place): 2014
- Goal.com The best Malaysia XI of all time: 2020

Records

- Selangor all-time top scorer: 177 goals
- Malaysia national football team all-time top scorer: 89 goals
- Southeast Asia all-time top scorer for men's national teams: 89 goals
- Asia-Pacific all-time top scorer for men's national teams: 89 goals
- 20th century all-time top scorer for men's national teams (1901–2000): 89 goals
- The youngest player to score 50 goals for men's national teams: aged 22 years 273 days
- Former all-time top scorer for men's national teams between 27 October 1980 until 16 June 2004 after surpassing Ferenc Puskás 84 goals.
- Former Asian all-time top scorer for men's national teams between 2 May 1979 until 16 June 2004 after surpassing Kunishige Kamamoto 75 goals.

Orders

- Malaysia:
  - Member of the Order of the Defender of the Realm (A.M.N.) (1977)
- Pahang:
  - Knight Companion of the Order of the Crown of Pahang (D.I.M.P.) – Dato' (2000–posthumously)
- Selangor
  - Recipient of the Meritorious Service Medal (P.J.K.) (1977)
  - Knight Companion of the Order of Sultan Salahuddin Abdul Aziz Shah (D.S.S.A.) – Dato' (2001–posthumously)

== Filmography ==
| Year | Title | Role |
|---|---|---|
| 1983 | Mekanik | Himself |

== Legacy ==
Several places and honours were named after him, including:

- The Mokhtar Dahari Community Square (Dataran Komuniti Mokhtar Dahari), a community hall located at Kampung Pandan, Kuala Lumpur was named after him where Mokhtar used to stay, occasionally playing football there.
- A futsal court called Gelanggang Mokhtar Dahari (Moktar Dahari Futsal Court), located at Putrajaya Futsal Complex in Putrajaya, is named after him.
- The Mokhtar Dahari Academy (Akademi Bola Sepak Negara Mokhtar Dahari), located at Gambang, Pahang, established on 10 April 2014, was named after him.
- The Shah Alam-Batu Arang Highway connecting Shah Alam and Puncak Alam was renamed Persiaran Mokhtar Dahari in 2014.
- In 2014, Google celebrated his 61st birthday. There is also a theatre showcase his legendary football career in Istana Budaya called "Super Mokh" portrayed by Malaysian singer-actor, Awie.

== See also ==
- List of progression men's association football goalscoring record
- List of top international men's football goalscorers by country
- List of men's footballers with 100 or more international caps
- List of men's footballers with 50 or more international goals
- List of one-club men in association football

== Bibliography ==
- Mokhtar Dahari Wira Bolasepak Negara. Zabidi Ismail. (in Malay). Dewan Bahasa dan Pustaka (1999). ISBN 9-836-24959-1
- Mokhtar Dahari: Legenda Bola Sepak Malaysia. Zinnitulniza Abdul Kadir. (in Malay). Institute of Translation & Books of Malaysia (2013). ISBN 978-9-6743037-0-9
