= Football at the 1979 SEA Games =

- Venue: 1 (in 1 host city)
- Dates: 22 September - 30 September 1977
- Nations: 5

Football was contested as part of the programme for the 1979 Southeast Asian Games which was hosted in Jakarta, Indonesia from 21 to 30 September 1979. It was the 10th edition of the men's football tournament at the multi-sport event organised by the SEA Games Federation Committee.

The football tournament began with the first matches of the group stage on 22 September 1979 and ended with the gold medal match on 30 September 1979. Defending champions Malaysia and hosts Indonesia contested the final. Malaysia defeated Indonesia 1–0 to win the gold medal. No dedicated bronze medal match was held after a play-off for second place in the group stage was required. Thailand lost the play-off against Indonesia and received the bronze medal as a result.

== Background ==
Football had been part of the Southeast Asian Games programme following the debut of the men's competition at the inaugural 1959 SEAP Games in Thailand. Malaysia were the defending champions after defeating Thailand 2–0 as hosts in the gold medal match at the previous edition in 1977. Burma were the most successful team having won the gold medal five times previously.

== Format ==
In total, five teams took part in the competition. They contested a single round robin group. The winners and runners-up would then contest the gold medal match. Third place would win the bronze medal.

=== Participants ===
- Burma
- Indonesia
- Malaysia
- Singapore
- Thailand

== Venue ==
Matches were played at the Gelora Senayan Main Stadium in Jakarta, Indonesia.

Jakarta is located in Indonesia	Jakarta
Jakarta is located in Indonesia	Gelora Senayan Main Stadium
Jakarta is located in Indonesia	Capacity: 110,000

== Group stage ==
Malaysia advanced to the gold medal match. As Indonesia and Thailand were tied on points, goals scored and goals conceded, a play-off was organised to determine second place, the team which would advance to the gold medal match and the bronze medalists.

=== Table ===
Pos	Team	Pld	W	D	L	GF	GA	GD	Pts	Qualification
1	Malaysia	4	2	2	0	3	0	+3	6	Advance to Gold medal match
2	Indonesia	4	2	1	1	6	4	+2	5	Advance to Second place play-off
2	Thailand	4	2	1	1	6	4	+2	5	Advance to Second place play-off
4	Singapore	4	1	1	2	4	8	−4	3	
5	Burma	4	0	1	3	2	5	−3	1	

=== Matches ===
22 September 1979

Indonesia	3–0	Singapore
Idris 52'; Risdianto 64'; Nere 80'

Gelora Senayan Main Stadium, Jakarta
22 September 1979

Thailand	1–0	Burma

Gelora Senayan Main Stadium, Jakarta

23 September 1979

Singapore	0–2	Malaysia
		Wong 76'; Sani 84'

Gelora Senayan Main Stadium, Jakarta
23 September 1979

Indonesia	1–3	Thailand

Gelora Senayan Main Stadium, Jakarta

25 September 1979

Malaysia	0–0	Burma

Gelora Senayan Main Stadium, Jakarta
25 September 1979

Singapore	2–2	Thailand

Gelora Senayan Main Stadium, Jakarta

26 September 1979

Burma	1–2	Singapore

Gelora Senayan Main Stadium, Jakarta
26 September 1979

Indonesia	0–0	Malaysia

Gelora Senayan Main Stadium, Jakarta

28 September 1979

Malaysia	1–0	Thailand

Gelora Senayan Main Stadium, Jakarta
28 September 1979

Indonesia	2–1	Burma

Gelora Senayan Main Stadium, Jakarta

== Second place play-off ==
Indonesia defeated Thailand on penalties to advance to the gold medal match.

29 September 1979

Indonesia	0–0	Thailand
Penalties
	3–1

Gelora Senayan Main Stadium, Jakarta

== Gold medal match ==
Malaysia defeated Indonesia to win the gold medal.

30 September 1979

Indonesia	0–1	Malaysia
		Dahari 16'

Gelora Senayan Main Stadium, Jakarta
Attendance: 100,000
Referee: Thaung Tin (Burma)
