= List of Sarawak FA players =

This is a list of former players of Sarawak Football Association. The club was founded in 1974 by Datuk Haji Taha Ariffin with his assistant from the Sarawak government. They made their debut in the Borneo Cup in 1974 and were elected into the Football League five years later in 1979, before moving into their new Sarawak State Stadium. Mohd Ali Sapiee is the current record holder of appearance records in both league matches and all competitions having played for the club from 1982 to 2001. Ramos Sari who had an eleven-year spell at Sarawak FA between 1996 and 2006, is the current holder of scoring records in both league and all competitions. The player with the most appearances in all competitions is Roslan Ismail, having made his debut in 1982.

== List ==
The list includes all Sarawak FA players who in competitive matches since 1979 in any semi-pro competition – Malaysia Super League, Malaysia Premier League, Malaysia FA Cup, malaysia Cup, Borneo Cup and Malaysia Charity Shield as well as Asian matches in the AFC Champions League. Substitute appearances are included but wartime fixtures are not.

=== List of former local players ===
Players who represented their country while at the club.

Name	Nationality	Position	Years	Appearances	Goals	Previous club
Muhammad Ammar Bin MD. Yusof Mustafa	(Sarawak) Malaysia	Striker	2017–2020	275	47759	(Malaysia) Sarawak FA
Ong Kim Swee	(Sarawak) Malaysia	Midfielder	1993–1994	31	6	(Malaysia) Malacca FA
Gilbert Cassidy Gawing	(Sarawak) Malaysia	Centre Midfield	1994-2002	75	12	(Malaysia) Sarawak FA
Wong Sai Kong	(Negeri Sembilan) Malaysia	Centre Midfield	2002–2004 & 2010	47	11	(Malaysia) Negeri Sembilan FA
Ching Hong Aik	(Malacca) Malaysia	Defender	2002	13	0	(Malaysia) Negeri Sembilan FA
Mazlan Wahid	(Malacca) Malaysia	Goalkeeper	1992–2001	126	0	(Malaysia) Malacca FA
Jalil Ramli	(Sarawak) Malaysia	Striker	1985-1997	223	101	
Rozaimi Abdul Rahman	(Sabah) Malaysia	Forward	2010	1	0	
Pengiran Bala	(Sarawak) Malaysia	Attacking Midfielder	1987-1994	156	45	
Hairul Ikmal	(Penang) Malaysia	Fullback	1999-2001	21	0	
Hariri Mohd Safii	(Sarawak) Malaysia	Defender	2008–2010	17	0	
George Benny Stephens	(Sarawak) Malaysia	Sweeper	1999-2010	113	5	(Argentina) Boca Juniors
Stanley Fraizer	(Sarawak) Malaysia	Goalkeeper	1993-1994	26	0	
Pitta Sham Ahmad	(Sarawak) Malaysia	Fullback	2000-2006	58	1	
Mohd Hisyam Ali	(Sarawak) Malaysia	Forward	1994-1997	30	10	
Mohd Khairul Izzat Alias	(Selangor) Malaysia	Defender	1999-2002	25	0	
Hamidin Manap	(Malacca) Malaysia	Midfielder	1978-1983	62	11	
Shahril Arsat	(Selangor) Malaysia	Midfielder	2003-2004	34	6	
Morshidi Awetl	(Sarawak) Malaysia	Striker	1977-1981	63	20	
Azralan Azmi	(Johor) Malaysia	Defender	1985-1988	32	0	
Yubil Badong	(Sarawak) Malaysia	Defensive Midfielder	2003-2011	79	4	
Burhaniza Abu Bakar	(Sarawak) Malaysia	Midfielder	1989-1996	103	21	
Rafiz Abu Bakar	(Sabah) Malaysia	Midfielder	2010	19	2	
Awang Ali Bema	(Sarawak) Malaysia	Fullback	1980-1988	62	2	
Herman Bulang	(Sarawak) Malaysia	Defender	1978-1985	44	3	
Thomas Dundang	(Sarawak) Malaysia	Midfielder	1969-1979	80	11	
Mohd Husaini Hussin	(Perak) Malaysia	Midfielder	1997-2007	144	22	
Ghazali Iring	(Sabah) Malaysia	Goalkeeper	1998-2002	38	0	
Abdul Aziz Ismail	(Penang) Malaysia	Defender	2010-2011	30	1	
Aznal Helmi Ismail	(Negeri Sembilan) Malaysia	Fullback	1998-2001	33	3	
Roslan Ismail	(Sarawak) Malaysia	Defender	1982–1998	278	10	
Ruslan Mustapha	(Sarawak) Malaysia	Defender	1999-2000	23	0	
Luis Jakai	(Sarawak) Malaysia	Striker	1977-1987	95	36	
Abang Mohammad Za'afari	(Sarawak) Malaysia	Defender	2003-2005	25	0	
Mohd Shamsuk Fahmie	(Sarawak) Malaysia	Fullback	2009-2012	31	1	
Venice Elphi Danny Kaya	(Sarawak) Malaysia	Attacking Midfielder	2010-2012	50	10	
Khairol Jamel	(Sarawak) Malaysia	Attacking Midfielder	1987-1997	155	37	
Terrance Janting	(Sarawak) Malaysia	Goalkeeper	1998-2002	16	0	
Affendi Jol	(Sarawak) Malaysia	Goalkeeper	1983-1993	123	0	
Affendi Julaihi	(Sarawak) Malaysia	Winger	1993-2001	114	37	
Mohd Nazri Lamat	(West Germany) Malaysia	Sweeper	1970-1977	77	8	
Latif Lamin	(Negeri Sembilan) Malaysia	Defender	1981-1986	53	6	
Ong Heng Leong	(Malacca) Malaysia	Fullback	1998-2000	29	2	
Bobby Chua Kim Lun	(Sabah) Malaysia	Winger	2000-2006	88	21	
Efendi Abdul Malek	(Negeri Sembilan) Malaysia	Striker	2010	15	4	(Malaysia) Negeri Sembilan FA
Zapri Manai	(Sarawak) Malaysia	Midfielder	1989-1996	72	11	
Dahlan Matussin	(Sarawak) Malaysia	Midfielder	1987-1993	85	9	
Musabaqah Meliki	(Sarawak) Malaysia	Defensive Midfielder	2010-2013	33	1	
Ibrahim Mentali	(Sarawak) Malaysia	Forward	1990-2002	30	12	
Hyward Gregory	(Sarawak) Malaysia	Sweeper	1970-1980	72	12	
Awang Mahyan Awang Mohammad	(Sarawak) Malaysia	Striker	1979–1986	100	35	
Irwanshah Mohamad	(Sarawak) Malaysia	Winger	1999-2002	37	4	
Zulfikli Morshidi	(Sarawak) Malaysia	Fullback	1996-2002	53	2	
Stuart Otto Munan	(Sarawak) Malaysia	Defender	1982-1988	62	1	
G. Muthu	(Malacca) Malaysia	Winger	1998-2000	34	8	
Zulkarnain Poasa	(Sarawak) Malaysia	Midfielder	1994-2000	66	5	
Shamsurin Bin Abdul Rahman	(Malacca) Malaysia	Striker	1993–1998	81	32	(Malaysia) Malacca FA
Engku Shahrulerizal	(Johor) Malaysia	Fullback	2012-2013	10	0	
Mohd Syaiful Sabtu	(Negeri Sembilan) Malaysia	Forward	2007-2010	35	9	
Suffian Abdul Rahman	(Malacca) Malaysia	Midfielder	1998-2004	50	5	
Roziman Bin Ramblie	(Sarawak) Malaysia	Midfielder	1999-2005	36	7	
Mohd Safee Mohd Sali	(Selangor) Malaysia	Striker	2005–2006	26	10	(Malaysia) Kuala Lumpur FA
Jeevareddy Samikanu	(Sarawak) Malaysia	Winger	1998-2002	28	0	
Mohd Ali Sapiee	(Sarawak) Malaysia	Defensive Midfielder	1992–2002	138	12	
Ramles Sari	(Sarawak) Malaysia	Attacking Midfielder	1992-2000	106	29	(Malaysia) Sarawak Youth Team
Ramos Sari	(Sarawak) Malaysia	Winger	1992–2000	111	23	(Malaysia) Sarawak Youth Team
Sulaiman Stapok	(Sarawak) Malaysia	Striker	1973-1983	80	22	
Mohd Faiz Suariani	(Pahang) Malaysia	Winger	1981-1986	39	2	
Kassim Taha	(Sarawak) Malaysia	Defender	1969-1980	89	6	
Sebastian Christi Lemon	(Sarawak) Malaysia	Winger	2010-2013	24	4	
Sapian Abdul Wahid	(Malacca) Malaysia	Striker	2003-2006	44	19	
Kamarulzaman Yaacob	(Malacca) Malaysia	Forward	1998-2000	22	8	
James Yaakub	(Sarawak) Malaysia	Striker	1976-1985	63	35	
Mohd Nazri Yunos	(Johor) Malaysia	Midfielder	1998-2004	72	10	
Johnny Joseph	(Sarawak) Malaysia	Defender	1981-1985	30	2	
Mohamed Nor Efendi Md Yusof	(Sarawak) Malaysia	Goalkeeper	1996-2010	101	0	
Moris Jagan	(Sarawak) Malaysia	Forward	1992-1995	26	4	
Mohd Fazlan Shauqi	(Sabah) Malaysia	Midfielder	2010-2011	24	0	
Zarul Izwan Zainal	(Negeri Sembilan) Malaysia	Goalkeeper	2001-2007	16	0	
Effendi Sugandi	(Sarawak) Malaysia	Defender	1969-1976	69	3	
Rudy Arfian Mohamad Rejeni	(Sarawak) Malaysia	Midfielder	1991-1998	55	3	
Jamal Wasli	(Sarawak) Malaysia	Striker	1967-1973	52	30	
Abu Bakar Amran	(Kedah) Malaysia	Fullback	1999-2003	40	2	
Lukas Kallang	(Sarawak) Malaysia	Winger	1983-1989	61	18	
Abdul Rani Abdullah	(Sarawak) Malaysia	Defender	1999-2005	50	4	
Mattasan Abon	(Sarawak) Malaysia	Defender	1972-1978	43	1	
Billy Winsell anak Anthony Gak	(Sarawak) Malaysia	Defender	1998-2001	20	0	
Saiful Amar Sudar	(Sarawak) Malaysia	Goalkeeper	2012–2013	26	0	(Malaysia) Selangor FA
Mohd Azizan Baba	(Perak) Malaysia	Centre Midfield	2012	28	6	(Malaysia) Johor FC
Shahrul Abdul Malek	(Sarawak) Malaysia	Centre Midfield	2010-2013	29	5	(Malaysia) Sarawak FA President Team
Mohd Fareez Tukijo	(Sarawak) Malaysia	Defender	2009–2013	16	0	(Malaysia) Sarawak FA President Team
Shahran Abdul Samad	(Sarawak) Malaysia	Defender	2011–2013	11	0	Sarawak FA President Team
Mahmud Hassan	(Sarawak) Malaysia	Defender	1979-1982	11	0	–

=== List of former foreign players ===
Players who represented their country while at the club.

Name	Nationality	Position	Years	Appearances	Goals	Previous club
Kurniawan Dwi Yulianto	Indonesia	Striker	2005–2006	31	29	(Indonesia) Persija Jakarta
Muhammad Ammar Bin MD. Yusof Mustafa	Sarawak	Magician	2012–2020	17	8	(Sarawak) Bintulu
David Evans	Australia	Defender	1991–1997	108	5	(England) Crystal Palace FC
Craig Naven	Australia	Midfielder	1997-1999	36	7	(South Africa) Jomo Cosmos
Paul Roberts	Australia	Attacking Midfielder	2002	21	4	(Australia) Perth Glory FC
John Hunter	Australia	Striker	1991–1995	99	50	(Hong Kong) South China AA
William Billy Bones	England	Defensive Midfield	1997–1998	26	4	(England) Sunderland FC
Guy Bwele	Cameroon	Defensive Midfield	2011–2013	36	10	(Cameroon) Coton Sport FC de Garoua
Robert Eshun	Ghana	Forward	2003	19	9	(Belgium) K.F.C. Dessel Sport
Romeo Kambou	Burkina Faso	Striker	2002, 2005–2006	56	1	(United Arab Emirates) Al Dhafra Club
Kim Grant	Ghana	Striker	2004	7	4	(Portugal) Imortal DC
Emmanuel Sarpong	Ghana	striker	2005	13	6	(Russia) Torpedo Moscow
Fernando Manuel Co	Guinea-Bissau	Winger	2005-2006	33	9	(Brazil) Gremio
Marko Ganasson	Lesotho	Fullback	2006	15	1	(India) Mohun Bagan
Lamie T Kiawu	Liberia	Defender	2000-2001	12	0	(Japan) Verdy Kawasaki
Neathan Gibson	Zimbabwe	Striker	1995–1996	39	19	(United States) San Jose Grizzlies
Junaid Hartley	South Africa	Striker	2006–2007	22	7	(South Africa) Maritzburg United F.C.
James Ngaulala-Arffrin	Nigeria	Striker	1998-1999	30	10	(Chile) Colo Colo
Kallé Soné	Cameroon	Striker	2012	1	1	(Romania) CS Otopeni
Joël Epalle	Cameroon	Defensive Midfield	2012–2013	14	6	(Greece) Iraklis
Ivan Ziga	Slovakia	Centre Midfield	2006–2007	26	6	(Malaysia) Malacca FA
Vedran Muratović	Croatia	Striker	2012	10	7	(Bosnia and Herzegovina) NK Čelik Zenica
Ivan Babic	Croatia	Striker	2013	15	8	(Cyprus) Ethnikos Achna FC
Jose Luis Feitoza	Brazil	Striker	2007	11	3	(Brazil) Santos
Brutil Hose	Curaçao	Forward	2005	16	3	(Qatar) Al-Wakrah Sport Club
Doug Ithier	Australia	Centre Midfield	1998	22	3	(Australia) Perth Glory FC
Gareth Naven	Australia	Centre Midfield	1995	21	2	(Australia) Perth Kangaroos IFC
Yusuke Sasa	Japan	Centre Midfield	2007	19	4	(Japan) Consadole Sapporo
Shane Thompson	Australia	Centre Midfield	2005	13	1	(Australia) Adelaide United FC
Alistair Edwards	Australia	Striker	1997–1998	32	13	(Australia) Sydney Olympic FC
Hassan Al Mohamed	Lebanon	Striker	2014	6	0	(Lebanon) Nejmeh SC
