= Malaysia national football team =

Men's association football team

Malaysia
- Nickname(s): Harimau Malaya (Malayan Tigers)
- Association: Football Association of Malaysia (FAM)
- Confederation: AFC (Asia)
- Sub-confederation: AFF (Southeast Asia)
- Head coach: Bojan Hodak
- Captain: Dion Cools
- Most caps: Soh Chin Ann (195)
- Top scorer: Mokhtar Dahari (89)
- Home stadium: Bukit Jalil National Stadium
- FIFA code: MAS
| First colours | Second colours |

FIFA ranking
- Current: 133 (18 November 2026)
- Highest: 75 (8 August 1993)
- Lowest: 178 (15 March 2018)

First international
- Malaysia 1–1 Thailand (Kuala Lumpur, Malaysia; 12 October 1963) (Note: Result count since after the Federation of Malaysia formation on 16 September 1963.)

Biggest win
- Malaysia 11–0 Philippines (Tehran, Iran; 7 September 1974)

Biggest defeat
- United Arab Emirates 10–0 Malaysia (Abu Dhabi, United Arab Emirates; 3 September 2015)

AFC Asian Cup
- Appearances: 4 (first in 1976)
- Best result: Group stage (1976, 1980, 2007, 2023)

ASEAN Cup
- Appearances: 1 (first in 2026)
- Best result: Third place (2026)

ASEAN Championship
- Appearances: 14 (first in 1996)
- Best result: Champions (2010)
Medal record
Asian Games
| Bronze medal – third place | 1974 Tehran | Team |
SEA Games
| Bronze medal – third place | 1969 Myanmar | Team |
| Silver medal – second place | 1971 Malaysia | Team |
| Bronze medal – third place | 1973 Singapore | Team |
| Silver medal – second place | 1975 Thailand | Team |
| Gold medal – first place | 1977 Malaysia | Team |
| Gold medal – first place | 1979 Indonesia | Team |
| Silver medal – second place | 1981 Philippines | Team |
| Bronze medal – third place | 1983 Singapore | Team |
| Bronze medal – third place | 1985 Thailand | Team |
| Silver medal – second place | 1987 Indonesia | Team |
| Gold medal – first place | 1989 Malaysia | Team |
FIFA ASEAN Cup
| Bronze medal – third place | 2026 Indonesia | Team |

The Malaysia national football team (Malay: Pasukan bola sepak kebangsaan Malaysia) represents Malaysia in international football and is governed by the Football Association of Malaysia. The national team is recognised by FIFA as the successor of the defunct Malaya national football team which was founded for the 1963 Merdeka Tournament one month before the institution of Malaysia. The team is officially nicknamed Harimau Malaya in reference to the Malayan Tiger. Former player Mokhtar Dahari is one of the top goal scorers in international history.

Before Malaysia's formation, the Malaya national football team had already achieved notable success, including a bronze medal at the 1962 Asian Games. Malaysia's most significant achievements include qualifying for the 1972 Summer Olympics, winning the AFF Championship in 2010, and earning multiple SEA Games gold medals in 1961, 1977, 1979, and 1989. The team competes in tournaments such as the AFC Asian Cup, AFF Championship, and World Cup qualifiers, with Bukit Jalil National Stadium serving as its home ground. Over the years, Malaysia has developed strong rivalries with teams like Thailand, Indonesia, Singapore, and Cambodia contributing to the rich football culture in the region.

== History ==
=== Early years (1963–1969) ===
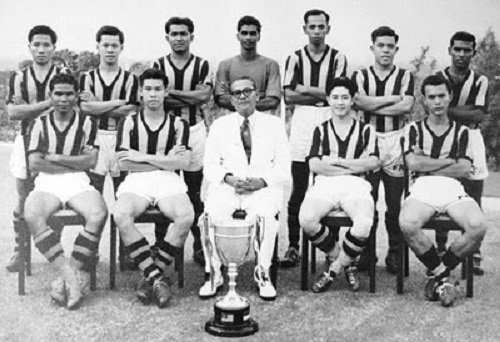
The winner of the second season of Merdeka Cup in 1958, Malaya football team, five years before the merger to form Malaysia. Also in the picture is Tunku Abdul Rahman (centre), the first Prime Minister of Malaya and at that time president of Football Association of Malaya & Asian Football Confederation.

Prior to 16 September 1963, North Borneo (now Sabah), Sarawak, Malaya and Singapore were represented by their own national teams, a situation which pre-dated the establishment of Malaysia. Malaya and Singapore often competed in international competitions such as the Merdeka Tournament while North Borneo and Sarawak competed in Borneo Cup. Malaya's biggest achievement in football was becoming the bronze medalist of the 1962 Asian Games held in Jakarta, Indonesia after defeating South Vietnam 4–1 led by Abdul Ghani Minhat, who at that time was the first Asian player to reach 50 goals for the men's national teams.

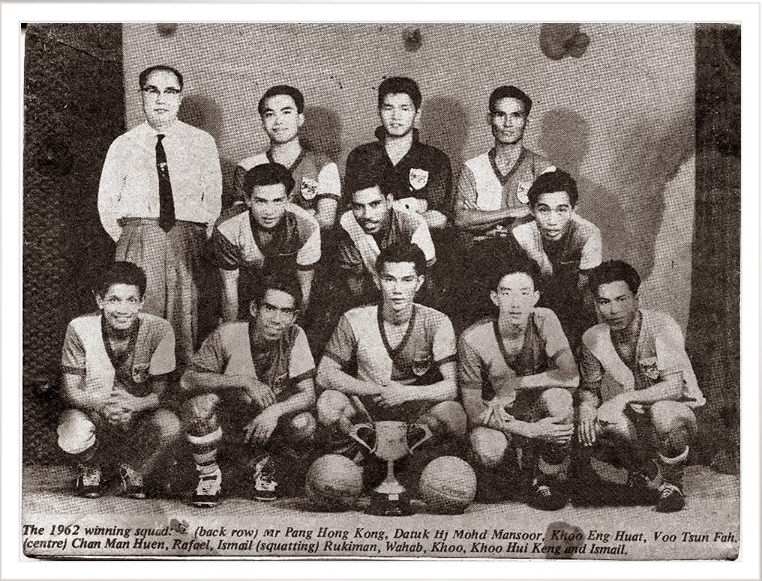
The winner of the first season of Borneo Cup in 1962, North Borneo football team, one year before the merger to form Malaysia.

The beginning of the Malaysian football team match took place in Merdeka Stadium on 8 August 1963 with the combined strength of Singapore and Malaya (although the federation only existed after 16 September 1963). With the combined forces of Malaya and Singapore, the team began by facing Japan, and lost 3–4. The team continued to use a combination of players from Singapore and Malay Peninsula until the formation of the Malaysia team, wherein the Football Association of Malaya was succeeded by the Football Association of Malaysia (FAM). The combination players with Singapore ended when the latter separated from Malaysia along with the establishment of Football Association of Singapore (FAS) and their subsequent reaffiliation with FIFA in 1965. Since then the squad was only represented by West Malaysian players, mainly due to travel time difficulties to East Malaysia and the players were not well known to the mainstream West Malaysian football. From 1966 to 1970, Chow Chee Keong was voted by Asian Football Confederation as the best Asian's goalkeeper for 5 straight years.

=== Olympic Tournament and Asia Competition (1970–1980) ===
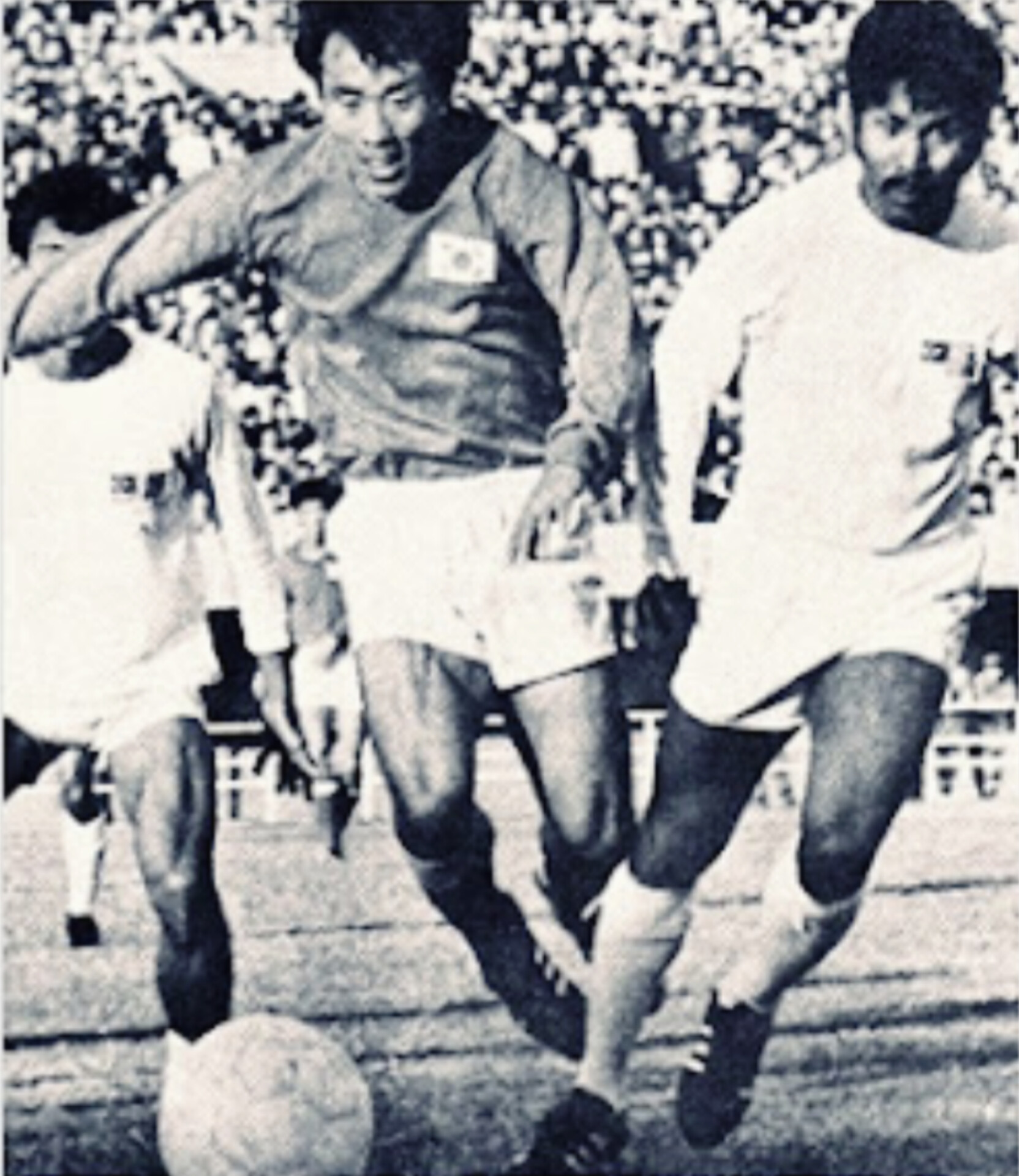
Malaysia vs. South Korea during the 1972 Summer Olympics qualifiers on 25 September 1971.

In 1971, James Wong of Sabah was the first player from East Malaysia to represent the country. Malaysia qualified for the 1972 Olympics in Munich, beating Japan 3–0, South Korea 1–0, Taiwan 3–0 and the Philippines 5–0 along the way. Although they managed to defeat the United States 3–0, they lost the other two matches with a score of 0–3 to West Germany and 0–6 to Morocco, ranking 10th in the final standings.

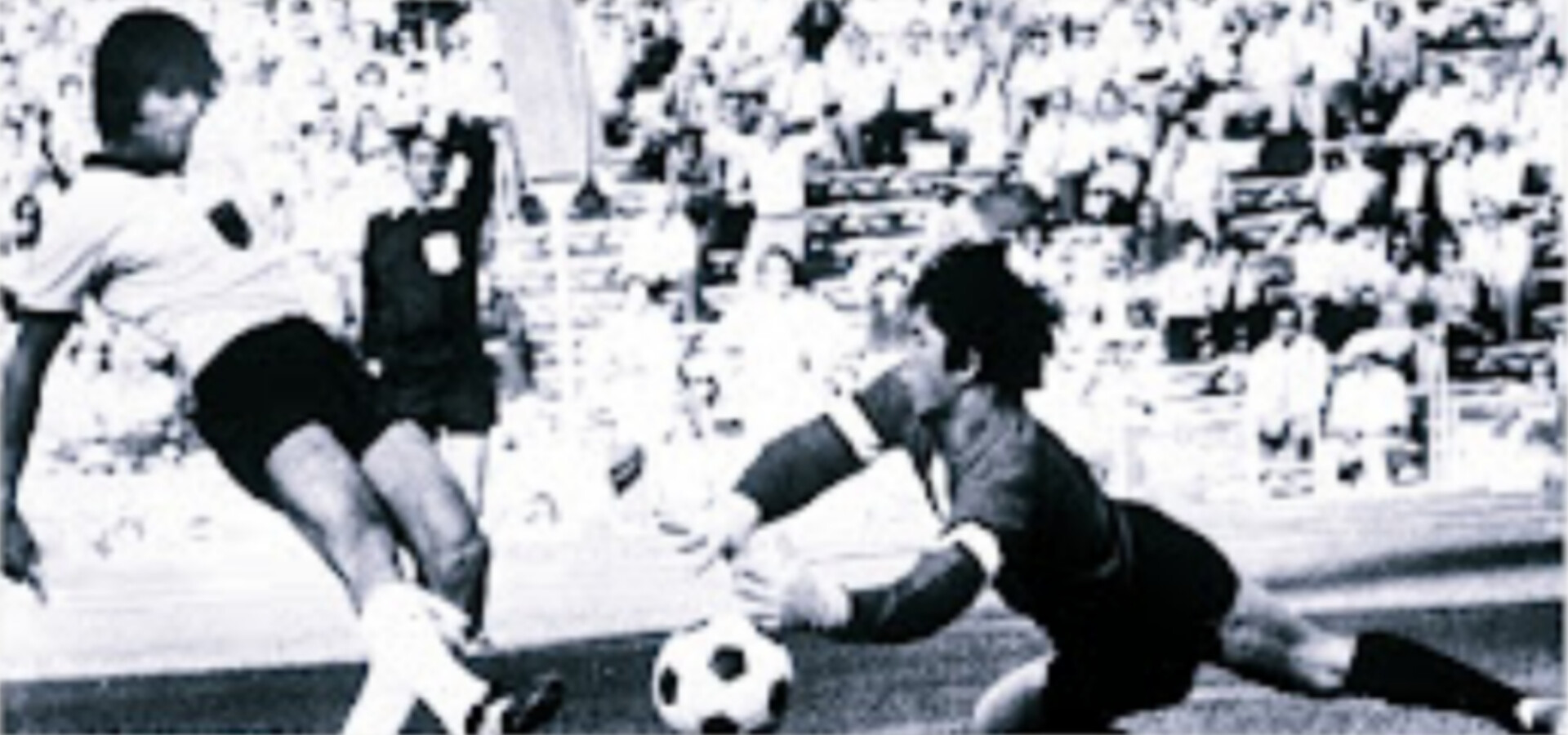
Malaysian goalkeeper Wong Kam Fook in action during the match against West Germany in the 1972 Summer Olympics at Munich on 27 August 1972.

Since 1972, Mokhtar Dahari has been considered a legendary football player for the Malaysian team maintaining his place as one of the best players in Asia. He manage to score a total of 125 goals in 167 appearances for Malaysia (including matches played against club sides, national 'B' teams and selection teams). Against other nations' national 'A' teams, he scored 89 goals in 142 appearances. This makes him as one of the world's top scorer for men's national teams at one time.

Together with the record of Soh Chin Ann. According to both RSSSF and IFFHS, Soh is the player with the most international caps in men's football and become the first men's footballers to reach 200 or more international caps (219) before being overtaken by Portugal's Cristiano Ronaldo in 2025. Two years later, Malaysia won their second bronze medal at the 1974 Asian Games after defeating North Korea 2–1. The team went on to qualify twice in a row for the AFC Asian Cup, in 1976 and 1980. It was only in 1977; when the FAM sent a talent scout to the East. The list continued by the late James Yaakub of Sarawak in 1977. The team also won the Merdeka Tournament four times, became runner-up three times and achieved third place twice during the 1970s. Malaysia qualified again for the 1980 Olympics in Moscow, beating Indonesia 6–1, South Korea 3–0, Brunei 3–1, Philippines 8–0 and tied with Japan 1–1. Thus, the team meet South Korea in the play-off match. Malaysia won the play-off against South Korea with a 2–1 scored in the Merdeka Stadium and qualified but joined the US-led boycott of the games as the Malaysian government made a decision to protest the Soviet Union's invasion of Afghanistan.

==== 1976 AFC Asian Cup Group A ====
| Team | Pld | W | D | L | GF | GA | GD | Pts |
|---|---|---|---|---|---|---|---|---|
| Kuwait | 2 | 2 | 0 | 0 | 3 | 0 | +3 | 4 |
| China | 2 | 0 | 1 | 1 | 1 | 2 | –1 | 1 |
| Malaysia | 2 | 0 | 1 | 1 | 1 | 3 | –2 | 1 |

Malaysia participated the 1976 AFC Asian Cup for the first time, meeting Kuwait and China in Group A. During the tournament, Malaysia came in third place in the group, losing 0–2 to Kuwait in the opening match and drew 1–1 with China in the second match.

==== 1980 AFC Asian Cup Group B ====
| Team | Pld | W | D | L | GF | GA | GD | Pts |
|---|---|---|---|---|---|---|---|---|
| South Korea | 4 | 3 | 1 | 0 | 10 | 2 | +8 | 7 |
| Kuwait | 4 | 2 | 1 | 1 | 8 | 5 | +3 | 5 |
| Malaysia | 4 | 1 | 2 | 1 | 5 | 5 | 0 | 4 |
| Qatar | 4 | 1 | 1 | 2 | 3 | 8 | −5 | 3 |
| United Arab Emirates | 4 | 0 | 1 | 3 | 3 | 9 | −6 | 1 |

Malaysia made its second Asian Cup appearance in 1980, placed in Group B alongside South Korea, Kuwait, Qatar and the United Arab Emirates. They managed to hold South Korea 1–1 in the first match, but would lose 1–3 to Kuwait before regaining a 2–0 victory against the United Arab Emirates. Malaysia would eventually finish 3rd after holding Qatar 1–1 in their last match.

=== Falling performances and drought (1990–2009) ===
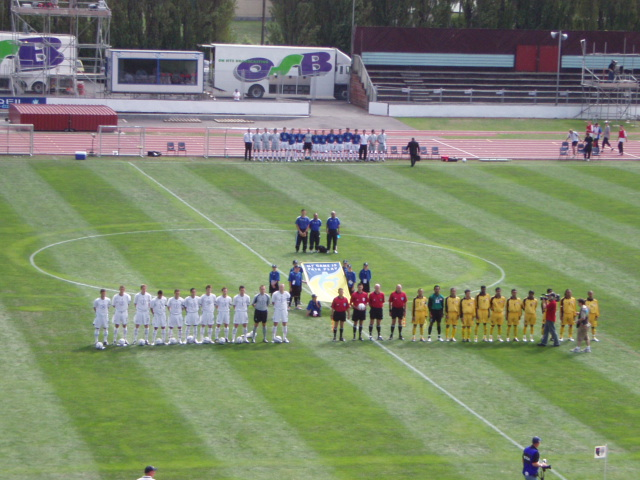
The Malaysian team (yellow) against New Zealand (white) during a friendly match in Queen Elizabeth II Park, Christchurch, New Zealand, on 19 February 2006.

In 1994, Malaysian football was embroiled in one of the largest bribery scandals in the country. With the dearth of mainstream interest and lack of funds, Malaysian football has failed to repeat the performances of the 1970s and 1980s to qualify into major tournaments, despite the recruitment of Claude LeRoy. Allan Harris appointed as a new head coach in 2001. Harris came with strong credentials, having assisted Terry Venables at FC Barcelona. In the second half of 2004, FAM appoint Bertalan Bicskei, former Hungarian goalkeeper and national coach, to succeed Allan Harris. Bicskei led the national side to third place at the regional Tiger Cup tournament, but was demoted to youth development duties by FAM for his actions during a friendly against Singapore in Penang on 8 June 2005. Bicskei, disgusted by the standard of officiating, threw a bottle onto the pitch before confronting a Singapore player. In September 2005, his contract was terminated after a mutual agreement.

Norizan Bakar became the next head coach of the Malaysian team. He guided the Malaysian squad to the 2007 AFF Championship semifinals in 2007, where Malaysia lost through penalties to Singapore. Norizan's position as the head coach was criticised by the Malaysian football community, fans and officials alike, after the team's performances during the 2007 AFC Asian Cup as co-host of the edition, where Malaysia lost to China 1–5, Uzbekistan 0–5 and Iran 0–2. After the removal of Norizan Bakar, B. Sathianathan took over as head coach. Although he guided the squad to win the 2007 Merdeka Tournament, Malaysia once again failed to qualify for the World Cup after losing 1–4 and drawing 0–0 with Bahrain in the qualifying round. In March 2008, Sathianathan once again reached the final of the Merdeka Tournament. However, Malaysia lost on penalties to Vietnam. Sathianathan also led Malaysia to the semi-finals of the 2008 Myanmar Grand Royal Challenge Cup. However, Malaysia then shockingly lost 1–4 to the eventual winners, Myanmar.

During the 2008 AFF Championship, Malaysia started their campaign with a 3–0 win over Laos but were defeated in the second match by Vietnam with a score of 2–3 and were finally eliminated when they lost 0–3 to Thailand in the final match of the group stage. This was the first time that the Malaysian squad had not passed through the group stages in 12 years. There were also reports that match-fixing and bribery that infiltrated Malaysian football in 1994 have returned. In the 2011 Asian Cup qualifiers, the Malaysian team lost 0–5 to the United Arab Emirates. This defeat was the final straw in the eyes of Malaysian supporters, and in February 2009, the contracts of Sathianathan and manager Soh Chin Ann were terminated.

==== FA Premier League Asia Cup (2003) ====
In July 2003, Malaysia qualified for the 2003 FA Premier League Asia Cup as the host nation and as the only national team to ever do so, and on 24 July 2003, they lost 1–4 against Chelsea in the semi-finals in a match where Hairuddin Omar scored Malaysia's only goal of the tournament to bring the match to 1–1. In the third-place playoff on 26 July 2003, they lost 0–4 against Birmingham City and placed fourth in the tournament.

==== 2004 AFC Asian Cup qualification ====
Malaysia were placed in the 6th group in the qualifying, alongside teams such as Iraq, Bahrain & Myanmar. The Malaysian national team drew with Iraq 0–0, before smashing Myanmar with 4 to nil goals. Malaysia later scored 2 goals against Bahrain in the last 10 minutes, securing them 5 points.

However, disappointment would strike as they bombed their next matches in Manama, Bahrain. Malaysia failed to score points there, losing 5–1 to Iraq, 3–1 to Bahrain & 2–1 to Myanmar. Thus, Malaysia failed to qualify for 2004 AFC Asian Cup, sitting at the 3rd place with 1 win, 2 draws & 3 losses. The Malaysian media & fans reacted how the Malaysian team could lose with such a humiliating result outside Malaysia, similar to the 2000 AFC Asian Cup qualification, when they bombed their second leg matches against Thailand, North Korea & Taiwan.

=== AFF Championship triumph (2010) ===

2010 AFF Championship champion second-leg finals starting line-up.

In April 2009, K. Rajagopal was named the new coach of Malaysia replacing B. Sathianathan and took over the position in July 2009, of which he also looked after the Malaysia under-23 squad. Rajagopal's first match was against Zimbabwe, which Malaysia won 4–0. Rajagopal also coached Malaysia in two games against visiting English champions, Manchester United, losing both matches 2–3 and 0–2. During his time as the coach of the Under-23 team, Rajagopal led Malaysia to their fifth SEA Games gold medal and also led Malaysia to qualify for the second round of the 2010 Asian Games as one of the best four third-placed teams after a lapse of 32 years.

During the 2010 AFF Championship, a total of 14 Malaysia's players were under the age of 23. Placed in group A and lost the first match to host Indonesia 1–5, Malaysia bounced back from defeat drawing Thailand and beating Laos 5–1. As runner up of group, Malaysia qualified for the semi-finals to meet Group B winners and defending champions Vietnam. In the first leg of the semifinal, Malaysia won 2–0 on home soil and later drew 0–0 in the second leg, advancing to the final with an aggregate of 2–0. An opportunity of revenge opened up in the finals as Malaysia again met Indonesia, who were unbeaten in all previous matches.

On the first leg of the finals at home, Malaysia won 3–0. Malaysia scored twice through Safee Sali and once through Mohd Ashaari Shamsuddin on a night when Bukit Jalil National Stadium was filled over capacity for the first time since it was built. The match attracted so many people that after tickets were sold out, policemen manning the gates were seen allowing friends and relatives into the stadium, causing people to trespass onto the cable bridge above the electronic display besides standing on the aisles and corridors to view the game. On the second leg of the finals that was held in Jakarta, Malaysia lost 1–2 to Indonesia but the final aggregate was 4–2 to Malaysia, thus Malaysia were awarded the title. It was the first time in history that Malaysia were crowned the champions of AFF Championship and a trophy in the international stage.

=== Stagnation (2011–2022) ===
==== 2010s: Mixed results and coaching changes ====
During the 2010s, the Malaysian national team underwent several coaching changes but struggled to achieve consistent success in international competitions.

In July 2014, Dollah Salleh replaced K. Rajagopal as head coach. Under Dollah's leadership, Malaysia reached the final of the 2014 AFF Championship, though the team failed to match its 2010 tournament victory. Subsequent matches saw uneven performances, including:

- Heavy defeats to Oman (0–6) and Palestine (0–6)
- A 1–1 draw against Timor-Leste
- A record 0–10 loss to the United Arab Emirates in September 2015, after which Dollah resigned.

Ong Kim Swee served as interim coach from September 2015 until March 2017, when Portuguese manager Nelo Vingada was appointed. Vingada's tenure saw disappointing results in 2019 AFC Asian Cup qualification:

- A 1–2 loss to Lebanon despite leading 1–0 at halftime
- A 1–1 draw and subsequent 0–2 loss to Hong Kong
- Two 1–4 defeats against North Korea
- Elimination with 1 draw and 5 losses in the qualifying group

Vingada resigned in late 2017 and was replaced by assistant coach Tan Cheng Hoe.

==== 2018 AFF Championship campaign ====
Following their failure to qualify for the 2019 AFC Asian Cup, Malaysia competed in the 2018 AFF Championship, being drawn in Group A alongside Vietnam, Myanmar, Laos, and Cambodia. The team advanced as group runners-up with three victories and one defeat (against Vietnam).

In the semifinals, Malaysia faced reigning champions Thailand:

- First leg: 0–0 draw at home
- Second leg: 2–2 draw in Bangkok, advancing on the away goals rule

The final against Vietnam saw:

- First leg: 2–2 draw in Malaysia
- Second leg: 0–1 loss in Hanoi
- Aggregate 2–3 defeat, marking Malaysia's third runners-up finish in the tournament's history

The tournament highlighted progress in Malaysia's youth development program, with several young players making significant contributions.

Malaysia entered the 2022 FIFA World Cup qualification from the first round due to its FIFA ranking. In the first round, Malaysia defeated Timor-Leste 12–2 on aggregate.

In the second round, Malaysia was drawn into Group G with Thailand, Indonesia, Vietnam, and the United Arab Emirates. The campaign included:

- A 3–2 victory over Indonesia, marked by heightened tensions between the rival nations.
- A 1–2 home defeat to the UAE after leading early.
- A 0–1 away loss to Vietnam, repeating their defeat in the 2018 AFF Championship.
- A 2–1 home win against Thailand, keeping qualification hopes alive.
- A 2–0 victory over Indonesia, moving Malaysia to second in the group behind Vietnam.

==== COVID-19 pandemic impact and coaching change ====
The COVID-19 pandemic significantly affected Malaysia's national team in 2021. During the final matches of 2022 World Cup qualification, several key players were unavailable, forcing head coach Tan Cheng Hoe to field a squad featuring new call-ups and veteran players.

The team's results during this period included:

- 0-2 defeat against Bahrain
- 1-4 loss to Kuwait in a friendly match
- 0-4 defeat against the United Arab Emirates
- 1-2 loss to Vietnam
- A final 1-0 victory over Thailand in qualification

These results eliminated Malaysia from World Cup contention. The team's struggles continued at the 2020 AFF Championship (held in December 2021), where they failed to advance beyond the group stage. Following this performance, Tan Cheng Hoe resigned as head coach in January 2022.

=== Resurgence of Harimau Malaya (2022–2025) ===
After Tan Cheng Hoe's resignation, former vice-president of Korea Football Association, Kim Pan-gon was appointed as Malaysia's new national team coach on a 2-year contract. His first task was the 2022 FAS Tri-Nations Series held in Singapore in March 2022. At that time, Pan-gon recorded his first success when Malaysia won 2–0 against Philippines but suffered a subsequent 1–2 loss to Singapore in the next match. Pan-gon's next challenge came when Malaysia faced Brunei and Hong Kong in a series of friendly matches as part of preparations for the 2023 AFC Asian Cup qualification. Malaysia won 4–0 against Brunei and 2–0 against Hong Kong, raising confidence and support from FAM and Malaysians in the hope of improving Malaysian football's fortunes which had declined in the previous years.

In the third round of 2023 AFC Asian Cup qualification, Malaysia faced 3 matches which began with a 3–1 victory against Turkmenistan in the first match, suffering a 1–2 loss to Bahrain, before successfully ending their campaign by defeating Bangladesh with 4–1. Thus, Malaysia finished second in Group E behind Bahrain and automatically qualified for the 2023 AFC Asian Cup on merit after 42 years. Shortly thereafter, Malaysia's FIFA ranking rose up to 147th from 154th in March 2022. Later in September 2022, Malaysia entered the 2022 King's Cup in Thailand, facing the host and later, Tajikistan in the final. Malaysia won 5–3 on penalties against Thailand after a 1–1 draw but later failed to win the cup after a 0–3 lost in the penalty shootout after being held to a goalless draw.

==== 2023 AFC Asian Cup qualification – third round Group E ====
| Pos | Team | Pld | W | D | L | GF | GA | GD | Pts | Qualification |
|---|---|---|---|---|---|---|---|---|---|---|
| 1 | Bahrain | 3 | 3 | 0 | 0 | 5 | 1 | +4 | 9 | 2023 AFC Asian Cup |
| 2 | Malaysia (H) | 3 | 2 | 0 | 1 | 8 | 4 | +4 | 6 | 2023 AFC Asian Cup |
| 3 | Turkmenistan | 3 | 1 | 0 | 2 | 3 | 5 | −2 | 3 | |
| 4 | Bangladesh | 3 | 0 | 0 | 3 | 2 | 8 | −6 | 0 | |

Source: AFC
(H) Hosts

At the end of 2022, before the start of the 2022 AFF Championship campaign, Malaysia held 2 friendly matches against Cambodia and Maldives, winning 4–0 and 3–0 respectively. In the 2022 AFC Championship, Malaysia has won 1–0 against Myanmar with Syihan Hazmi saving a late penalty to secure the win for Malaysia. In the next match, Malaysia went on to thrash Laos 5–0 but lost 0–3 against Vietnam in a controversial match that led to Azam Azmi's red card. Yet, Malaysia won 4–1 against causeway rivals, Singapore in the last match being the first time Malaysia had won over Singapore on home soil which also sees Malaysia finishing in second place of Group B, thus seeing them automatically qualified to semi-finals match against Thailand. Malaysia won the first leg of the match with Faisal Halim scoring the only goal in the match but in the second leg, Thailand scored thrice which see Malaysia failing to enter the final after with a 3–1 aggregate defeat to Thailand. Despite this, Malaysia ended 2022 with astonishing results overall which see them rose up to 145th in FIFA ranking.

Later in March 2023, Malaysia won again against Turkmenistan with 1–0 and 2–0 against Hong Kong at the Sultan Ibrahim Stadium in Johor in a series of friendlies. In June 2023, Malaysia won 4–1 against the Solomon Islands and recorded their second biggest victory ever when they won 10–0 against Papua New Guinea at the Sultan Mizan Zainal Abidin Stadium in Terengganu. Shortly after, Malaysia's FIFA ranking rose up again to 137th in the world and 4th in ASEAN, behind the Philippines (135th), Thailand (113th) and Vietnam (95th), thus making it the highest ranking attained in 17 years.

In September 2023, Malaysia faced their biggest challenge ever when they met Syria and China in Chengdu, China. Malaysia passed the test after coming back from two goals down to manage a 2–2 draw with Syria and 1–1 with China respectively. In October 2023, the Merdeka Tournament was held after a 10-year absence, with Malaysia meeting India and Tajikistan. In the opening match, Malaysia won 4–2 against India in the semi-final but later lost to Tajikistan again 0–2 in the final.

==== 2023 AFC Asian Cup ====
After 42 years of absence (excluding 2007, when Malaysia was one of the hosts), Malaysia went to the 2023 AFC Asian Cup with high expectations, as they were put in a group with Jordan, Bahrain, and South Korea. As part of the preparation for the tournament, Malaysia had a friendly match with Syria again with the same score as last year, a 2–2 draw. Malaysia opened their tournament with a disastrous start, as they were beaten 0–4 by Jordan. In the second match against Bahrain, whom they met in the qualifiers, the game looked to be ending in a draw, until Ali Madan scored a last-minute goal for Bahrain. Thus, Malaysia failed to advance past the group stages of the AFC Asian Cup again after four appearances, while they were also struggling to find their first Asian Cup win since their last win in 1980.

Malaysia headed into their final group stage fixture against the favourites in the group, South Korea. Within the 21st minute, Malaysia were already 1–0 down through a Jeong Woo-yeong header, heading into the second half of the match on the back foot. However, in the second half, Faisal Halim scored with an audacious chip against South Korean goalkeeper Jo Hyeon-woo (which was nominated as the goal of the tournament), followed up by a penalty slotted away by Arif Aiman to give Malaysia a surprising 2–1 lead against the Koreans. Eventually, a Lee Kang-in free-kick and a penalty from Son Heung-min put South Korea back in the lead. With the score 3–2 to the Koreans and the match surpassing the 90th-minute mark, it looked to be three losses out of three for Harimau Malaya until the 90+15th minute, when Romel Morales scored an equaliser against all odds. The match ended 3–3, securing a memorable draw, and earning Malaysia's first point since 1980.

==== 2026 FIFA World Cup qualification – Second Round ====
Heading into the match against Oman in March, the Malaysian camp remained optimistic about getting positive results. However, Malaysia suffered 2–0 defeats, both away & at home. Malaysia then managed to get 1 point against Kyrgyzstan and 3 points against Chinese Taipei, and eventually finished in third place with 10 points. However, it proved insufficient as Kyrgyzstan finished second with 11 points, thus seeing Malaysia out of contention for the World Cup, and instead compete in the third round of the AFC Asian Cup qualification.

==== Kim Pan-gon's resignation and temporary care by Pau Martí ====
Following Malaysia's elimination from the World Cup qualification, on 16 July 2024, Pan-gon announced his resignation as Malaysia's national team head coach, citing personal commitments. Assistant coach Pau Martí replaced Pan-gon as the caretaker coach. While managing the team, Martí helped the team win the 2024 Merdeka Tournament. The 2024 ASEAN Championship was his final international duty as the caretaker coach.

==== Peter Cklamovski appointment and 2027 AFC Asian Cup qualification ====
On 16 December 2024, FAM announced the appointment of Peter Cklamovski, who was recently the former manager of FC Tokyo, as the new head coach for the Malaysian team. Cklamovski will begin his duties on 5 January 2025 with the task of leading the team to qualify for the 2027 AFC Asian Cup. Subsequently on 11 January 2025, FAM announced a new management line-up for the national team as part of its restructuring process. Rob Friend has been recruited as CEO, Dr. Craig Duncan appointed as head of high performance and sports medicine, and former Australian international footballer Tim Cahill has been elected as a personal advisor on sports and international relations.

=== Falsification scandal (2025–2026) ===
On 26 September 2025, the FAM and seven "Malaysian heritage" players Gabriel Felipe Arrocha, Facundo Tomás Garcés, Rodrigo Julián Holgado, Imanol Javier Machuca, João Vitor Brandão Figueiredo, Jon Irazábal Iraurgui and Héctor Alejandro Hevel Serrano were sanctioned by FIFA after an investigation uncovered falsification and forgery of documents relating to the players' eligibility. The scandal involved attempts to register foreign-born footballers as Malaysian nationals, who played for Malaysia in the third round of the 2027 AFC Asian Cup qualifiers against Nepal and Vietnam. FIFA imposed a fine of CHF 350,000 (approximately RM 1.9 million) on FAM, while each player received an individual fine of CHF 2,000 (about RM 10,560) and a 12-month suspension from all football related activities. FAM announced that it would appeal the sanctions. On 6 October 2025, FIFA released an official report detailing falsifications concerning the players' eligibility, including the alleged birthplaces of their grandparents. While FAM claimed that the seven players had grandparents born in Malaysia, FIFA discovered that their grandparents had in fact been born in Argentina, Brazil, Spain and the Netherlands. FIFA condemned the act as a deliberate attempt to deceive, describing it as a serious breach of sporting integrity that undermines confidence in fair competition and compromises the fundamental principles of honesty and transparency in football. On 3 November 2025, the FIFA Appeal Committee rejected FAM's appeal and the sanctions stood.

On 17 December 2025, FIFA overturned the results of three friendly matches of Malaysia (against Cape Verde, Singapore and Palestine) into 0–3 defeats. On 5 March 2026, CAS dismissed FAM's appeal and slightly eased the punishments against the players. On 17 March 2026, the AFC also overturned the results of two matches in the third round qualification of 2027 Asian Cup against Nepal and Vietnam into 0–3 defeats, which resulted in Malaysia failing to qualify for the 2027 AFC Asian Cup. On 18 June 2026, FAM announced that Cklamovski, along with his assistants has departed from the national team by mutual consent.

=== Post-scandal resurgence and the return of Tan Cheng Hoe (2026–present) ===
On 25 June 2026, after his last stint in 2022, Tan Cheng Hoe returned to the national team after being appointed by FAM as the interim head coach. His first international duty was the 2026 ASEAN Championship, where Malaysia was grouped in Group B alongside Laos, Myanmar, Philippines, and Thailand.

Malaysia would eventually finish second in the group, losing only to Thailand, thus qualifying for the semi-finals, where they faced familiar rivals Vietnam. In the first leg at home, Malaysia would eventually lose 0–2, followed by another 2–0 defeat away in the second leg, thus failing to advance to the final since 2018 and further extending Vietnam's unbeaten record against Malaysia.

==== 2026 FIFA ASEAN Cup ====
Cheng Hoe's next international task was the 2026 FIFA ASEAN Cup being held in Indonesia, where Malaysia was drawn alongside Indonesia, Singapore, and Bangladesh in Group A. They opened the tournament with a 3–0 victory over Bangladesh before drawing 0–0 with Indonesia. On the final matchday of the group stage, Malaysia defeated Singapore 6–0, with Bérgson scoring three goals. Malaysia and Indonesia both finished with seven points and a +9 goal difference, but Malaysia advanced to the bronze final on goals scored after Indonesia defeated Bangladesh 9–2.

In the bronze final on 5 October, Malaysia faced Vietnam. The match finished 1–0 in favour of Malaysia, thus ending Vietnam's unbeaten streak against Malaysia. Despite finishing third, Malaysia finished the inaugural FIFA ASEAN Cup with no goals conceded.

== Team image ==
=== Media coverage ===
All matches of Malaysia are shown live on Astro Arena (friendlies, World Cup (2nd round only), and Media Prima (Asian Cup qualifiers), RTM (AFF Championship matches (except 2014 season), FIFA World Cup and AFC Asian Cup qualifiers), and (AFF Championship matches for 2014 season only). All matches are broadcast with both English (Astro only) and Malaysian commentary.

=== Kits ===
| Kit provider | Period | Ref |
|---|---|---|
| none | 1963–1974 | |
| (Germany) Adidas | 1975–1977 | |
| (England) Umbro | 1978 | |
| (Germany) Adidas | 1979–2006 | |
| (United States) Nike | 2007–2024 | |
| (Germany) Puma | 2025–2028 | |

2010 AFF Cup Final 2nd leg kit

Starting from the 1975 Merdeka Tournament until 1977, the Malaysia football team wore the kit from Adidas. In 1978, Malaysia switched to Umbro. From 1979 to 2006, the national team kit was manufactured and sponsored by Adidas. Since 2025, the official Malaysia team kit has been manufactured by Puma. The home kit design of black and yellow stripes is a throwback to the kit used by the Malayan national team in the 1920s. The national team of the 1970s also sported similar stripes, which are supposed to be reminiscent of the stripes of a tiger.

In November 2010, Nike Malaysia created a new football kit specially made for the 2010 AFF Championship. The home kit's design of black and yellow stripes is shaped by a black row of lines. The away kit features a plain blue front and red and white at the edge of the sleeves. Nike used the Malaysian flag as their logo instead of the Football Association of Malaysia logo to remember the team's success in the 1970s. On the underside of the flag, the quote "Tanah Tumpahnya Darahku" (The land that I spill my blood for) can be found. The quote is part of the Malaysia National Anthem, alluding that they are doing their best for the country.

The practice of using the flag on the kits ended when Malaysia got a new kit in late 2016. They have the FAM logo on the kits.

=== Grounds ===
Home stadium

Malaysia's home stadium is the Bukit Jalil National Stadium. The stadium capacity is 87,411 (seated) which makes it the ninth largest football stadium in the world. Malaysia's previous national stadium was the Merdeka Stadium before the Bukit Jalil sports complex was constructed. Since the start of 2017, Malaysia has played its home matches in 5 different stadiums all over Malaysia with Kuala Lumpur Stadium second in line to host an international match.

When there were ongoing renovations at the Bukit Jalil National Stadium, the team played at other stadiums such as Sultan Ibrahim Stadium and Sultan Mizan Zainal Abidin Stadium. Due to the high population in the Klang Valley, the other stadiums used do not get high support from the fans. The Bukit Jalil Stadium, which is the largest stadium in Malaysia with a capacity of 87,000, is still the home of the Malaya Tigers even though there are several events taking place a few days before the match.

Malaysia national football team home stadiums
| Image | Stadium | Capacity | Location | Last match |
|---|---|---|---|---|
| | Bukit Jalil National Stadium | 87,500 | Bukit Jalil, Kuala Lumpur | v Nepal (18 November 2025; 2027 Asian Cup qualification) |
| | Kuala Lumpur Stadium | 18,000 | Cheras, Kuala Lumpur | v Vietnam (16 August 2026; 2026 ASEAN Championship) |
| | Sultan Mizan Zainal Abidin Stadium | 50,000 | Kuala Nerus, Terengganu | v Papua New Guinea (20 June 2023; Friendly) |
| | Sultan Ibrahim Stadium | 40,000 | Iskandar Puteri, Johor | v Palestine (8 September 2025; Friendly) |

=== Training ground ===
Wisma FAM is the main headquarters for the Football Association of Malaysia which located at Kelana Jaya, Selangor. The training facility for the Malaysia national football team is also located at the Wisma FAM. Other than that, it also serves as a meeting point for the coaches and national players. Also equipped with a room for press statements and small apartment rooms available for the national players during the training camp. Sometimes, ticket matches are also sold on this training facility.

=== Supporters ===
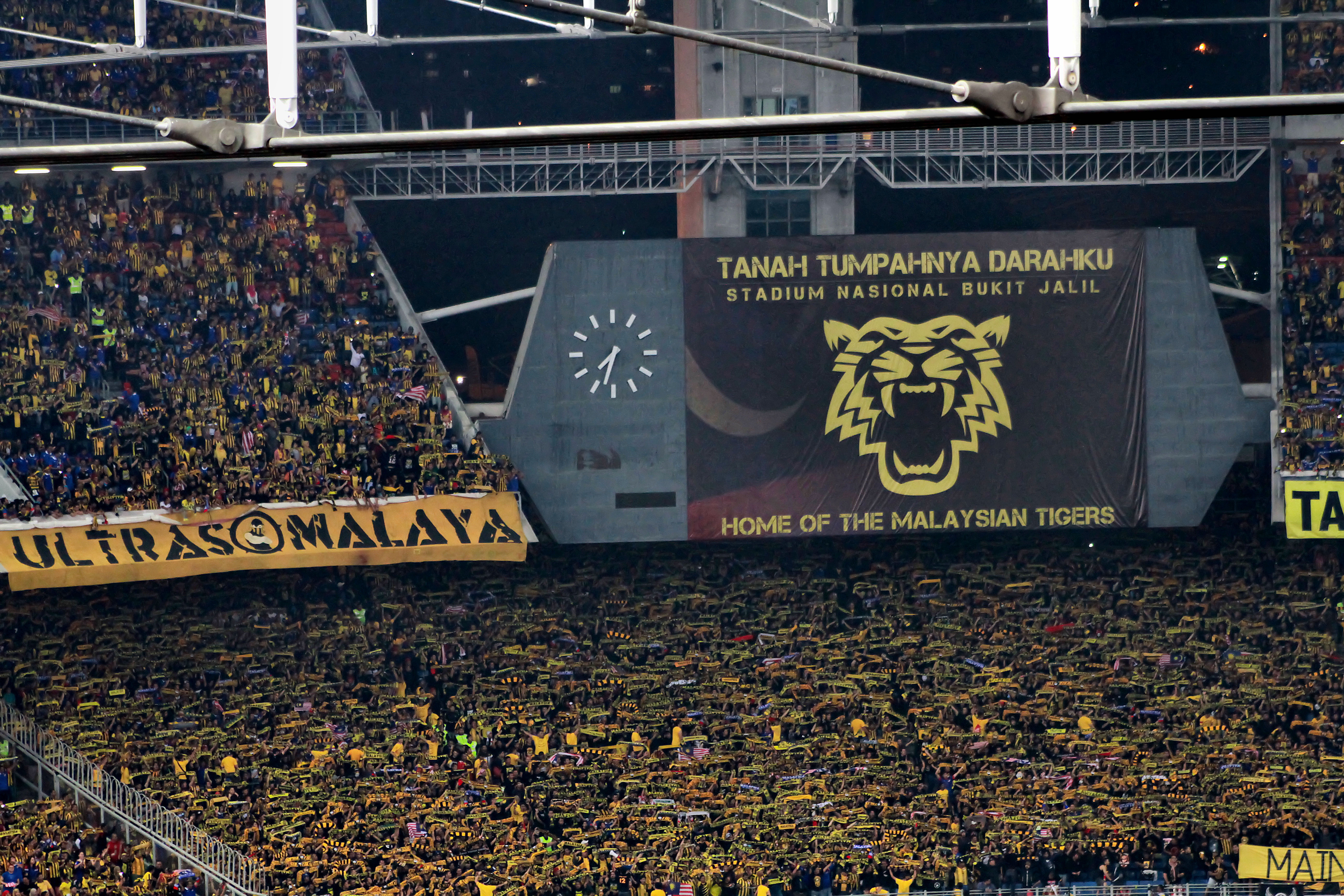
A part of the action from Ultras Malaya during the 2014 AFF Championship second leg final match between Malaysia and Thailand. Thailand won the competition.

Ultras Malaya is the name of the major supporter of the national team in Malaysia. They are known for their high fanaticism and support towards the national team. In every international match the national team plays, they are found in a group standing in the supporters' area. The main colours for these supporters are usually black with a yellow scarf and banners just like the national team kit colours. These supporters always bring flares, drums and large national flags to the stadiums.

==== Sponsorship ====
According to the website of Football Association of Malaysia, Malaysia main sponsors include Malaysia Airlines, Puma, Bank Islam, 100plus, Wonda Coffee, Konami, CAT, Warner Music Malaysia, Kronos, and Milo with the association also establish social responsibilities partners with Department of Wildlife and National Parks Peninsular Malaysia (PERHILITAN).

== Results and fixtures ==
The following is a list of match results in the last 12 months, as well as any future matches that have been scheduled.

Win Draw Loss Fixture

=== 2026 ===
| 31 March 2027 Asian Cup Qualification - Third Round | Vietnam | 3–1 | Malaysia | Ninh Bình, Vietnam |
| 19:00 UTC+7 | Đỗ Duy Mạnh 6'; Nguyễn Xuân Son 51', 59' | Report; Report (AFC) | Endrick 77' (pen.) | Stadium: Thiên Trường Stadium; Attendance: 19,518; Referee: Chae Sang-hyeop (South Korea) |

| 25 July 2026 ASEAN Championship Group B | Myanmar | 1–2 | Malaysia | Yangon, Myanmar |
| 16:30 UTC+6:30 | Myat Kaung Khant 9' | Report | Josué 52', 57' (pen.) | Stadium: Thuwunna Stadium; Attendance: 10,500; Referee: Yusuke Ohashi (Japan) |

| 28 July 2026 ASEAN Championship Group B | Malaysia | 4–0 | Laos | Kuala Lumpur, Malaysia |
| 21:00 UTC+8 | Josué 45'; Endrick 57'; Viengxay 66' (o.g.); Kuzain 84' | Report | | Stadium: Kuala Lumpur Stadium; Attendance: 10,044; Referee: Mohammed Sami Al-Ismail (Saudi Arabia) |

| 1 August 2026 ASEAN Championship Group B | Thailand | 2–0 | Malaysia | Bangkok, Thailand |
| 20:00 UTC+7 | Yotsakorn 38' (pen.); Teerasak 56' | Report | | Stadium: Rajamangala Stadium; Attendance: 16,037; Referee: Kim Woo-sung (South Korea) |

| 8 August 2026 ASEAN Championship Group B | Malaysia | 1–0 | Philippines | Kuala Lumpur, Malaysia |
| 21:00 UTC+8 | Pavithran 16' | Report | | Stadium: Kuala Lumpur Stadium; Attendance: 12,734; Referee: Alimardon Bainazarov (Kyrgyzstan) |

| 16 August 2026 ASEAN Championship SF 1st leg | Malaysia | 0–2 | Vietnam | Kuala Lumpur, Malaysia |
| 21:00 UTC+8 | | Report | Nguyễn Xuân Son 45+5'; Faris Danish 86' (o.g.) | Stadium: Kuala Lumpur Stadium; Attendance: 10,141; Referee: Rustam Lutfullin (Uzbekistan) |

| 19 August 2026 ASEAN Championship SF 2nd leg | Vietnam | 2–0 | Malaysia | Hanoi, Vietnam |
| 20:00 UTC+7 | Nguyễn Xuân Son 62', 89' | Report | | Stadium: Mỹ Đình National Stadium; Attendance: 37,966; Referee: Yusuke Ohashi (Japan) |

| 25 September 2026 FIFA ASEAN Cup Group A | Bangladesh | 0–3 | Malaysia | Jakarta, Indonesia |
| 16:00 UTC+7 | | Report | Arif Aiman 18', 38'; Bérgson 53' | Stadium: Gelora Bung Karno Stadium; Referee: Resul Mämmedow (Turkmenistan) |

| 28 September 2026 FIFA ASEAN Cup Group A | Malaysia | 0–0 | Indonesia | Jakarta, Indonesia |
| 19:30 UTC+7 | | Report | | Stadium: Gelora Bung Karno Stadium; Attendance: 56,894; Referee: Ko Hyung-jin (South Korea) |

| 1 October 2026 FIFA ASEAN Cup Group A | Malaysia | 6–0 | Singapore | Bandung, Indonesia |
| 19:30 UTC+7 | Bérgson 8' (pen.), 62', 90+3'; Wilkin 26'; Josué 76'; Syahir 87' | Report | | Stadium: Si Jalak Harupat Stadium; Referee: Kim Jong-hyeok (South Korea) |

| 5 October 2026 FIFA ASEAN Cup 3rd Place | Malaysia | 1–0 | Vietnam | Jakarta, Indonesia |
| 16:00 UTC+7 | Tierney 62' | Report | | Stadium: Gelora Bung Karno Stadium; Referee: Ko Hyung-jin (South Korea) |

| 14 November Friendly | China | 2–0 | Malaysia | Zhaoqing, China |
| 20:00 UTC+8 | Wang Yudong 10'; Zhang Yuning 18' | | | Stadium: Zhaoqing New District Sports Center Stadium; Referee: Ko Hyung-jin (South Korea) |

| 17 November Friendly | Malaysia | 2–1 | Yemen | Zhaoqing, China |
| 14:00 UTC+8 | Chin 7', 57' | | Al-Sheraji 78' | Stadium: Zhaoqing New District Sports Center Stadium; Referee: Zhang Lei (China) |

Notes

- ^{1} Non FIFA 'A' international match
- ^{2} The Asian Football Confederation (AFC) confirmed the venue change after Nepal's proposed stadium failed to meet its requirements. Nepal have confirmed that they will play at Bukit Jalil National Stadium as their home venue.

== Team officials ==
As of 21 November 2026

| Roles | Names | Appointment date |
Team Management
| Deputy CEO | (Malaysia) Stanley Bernard | 15 April 2025 |
Coaching Staff
| Head coach | (Croatia) Bojan Hodak | |
| Assistant coaches | (Malaysia) Aidil Zafuan | 17 March 2025 |
| Assistant coaches | (Malaysia) Hairuddin Omar | 2024 |
| Assistant coaches | (England) Jose Baxter | 15 May 2025 |
| Goalkeeping coach | (Australia) John Crawley | 17 March 2025 |
| Head of high performance and sports medicine | (Australia) Craig Duncan | 2 January 2025 |
| Doctor | (Spain) Xavier Valle | 28 August 2024 |
| Physiotherapist | (Spain) Edu Martinez | 28 August 2024 |
| Team coordinator | (Malaysia) Zulfadli Rozi | 17 March 2025 |
| Technical director | (Malaysia) Tan Cheng Hoe | 15 April 2025 |

=== Coaching history ===
As of match played 17 November 2026

List of Head Coaches
| Name | Period | GP | W | D | L | GS | GA | GD | Win % |
|---|---|---|---|---|---|---|---|---|---|
| (Malaysia) Peter Velappan | 1963 | | | | | | | | |
| (Malaysia) Choo Seng Quee | 1963 – 1964 | 11 | 3 | 3 | 5 | 23 | 23 | +0 | 27.27 |
| (West Germany) Otto Westphal | 1965 – 1966 | 12 | 1 | 4 | 7 | 11 | 25 | −14 | 8.33 |
| (Malaysia) Clement De Silva | 1966 | | | | | | | | |
| (Malaysia) Peter Velappan | 1966 | | | | | | | | |
| (Malaysia) Nagalingam Rajoo | 1967 | | | | | | | | |
| (West Germany) Dettmar Cramer | 1967 | | | | | | | | |
| (Malaysia) Edwin Dutton | 1967 | | | | | | | | |
| (England) Harold Hassall | 1968 | | | | | | | | |
| (Malaysia) Peter Velappan | 1968 | | | | | | | | |
| (Malaysia) Abdul Ghani Minhat | 1969 | 11 | 5 | 2 | 4 | 18 | 18 | +0 | 45.45 |
| (England) Harold Hassall | 1970 | | | | | | | | |
| (Scotland) Dave MacLaren | 1970 | | | | | | | | |
| (Malaysia) C. Arasaratnam | 1971 | 39 | 21 | 6 | 12 | 81 | 61 | +20 | 53.85 |
| (Malaysia) Jalil Che Din | 1972 | 26 | 13 | 3 | 10 | 41 | 34 | +7 | 50.00 |
| (Malaysia) Tam Sitwa | 1973 | 0 | 0 | 0 | 0 | 0 | 0 | +0 | — |
| (Malaysia) M. Kuppan | 1973 | 27 | 12 | 7 | 8 | 41 | 28 | +13 | 44.44 |
| (Malaysia) Jalil Che Din | 1974 | 18 | 8 | 4 | 6 | 35 | 30 | +5 | 44.44 |
| (Malaysia) M. Kuppan | 1974 – 1977 | 82 | 36 | 24 | 22 | 154 | 90 | +64 | 43.90 |
| (Malaysia) Chow Kwai Lam | 1978 | 22 | 11 | 3 | 8 | 40 | 35 | +5 | 50.00 |
| (West Germany) Karl-Heinz Weigang | 1979 – 1982 | 67 | 21 | 21 | 25 | 96 | 89 | +7 | 31.34 |
| (Malaysia) M. Chandran | 1982 – 1983 | 14 | 6 | 1 | 7 | 15 | 17 | −2 | 42.86 |
| (England) Frank Lord | 1983 – 1985 | 37 | 17 | 11 | 9 | 63 | 36 | +27 | 45.95 |
| (Malaysia) Mohamad Bakar | 1985 – 1986 | 13 | 4 | 3 | 6 | 17 | 24 | −7 | 30.77 |
| (Czechoslovakia) Jozef Vengloš | 1986 – 1987 | 13 | 6 | 3 | 4 | 21 | 13 | +8 | 46.15 |
| (Malaysia) Abdul Rahman Ibrahim | 1987 | 10 | 1 | 4 | 5 | 8 | 12 | −4 | 10.00 |
| (England) Richard Bate | 1988 | 5 | 1 | 2 | 2 | 4 | 10 | −6 | 20.00 |
| (Malaysia) M. Chandran | 1988 | 4 | 1 | 1 | 2 | 4 | 6 | −2 | 25.00 |
| (England) Trevor Hartley | 1989 | 8 | 6 | 0 | 2 | 14 | 5 | +9 | 75.00 |
| (Malaysia) Ahmad Shafie | 1990 | 4 | 0 | 1 | 3 | 0 | 7 | −7 | 0.00 |
| (Malaysia) Rahim Abdullah | 1991 | 6 | 1 | 1 | 4 | 7 | 12 | −5 | 16.67 |
| (England) Ken Worden | 1992 – 1993 | 17 | 5 | 6 | 6 | 26 | 22 | +4 | 29.41 |
| (France) Claude Le Roy | 1994 – 1995 | 5 | 1 | 1 | 3 | 6 | 10 | −4 | 20.00 |
| (Tunisia) Hatem Souisi | 1995 | 6 | 2 | 1 | 3 | 12 | 8 | +4 | 33.33 |
| (Malaysia) Wan Jamak Wan Hassan | 1996 – 1997 | 22 | 10 | 6 | 6 | 35 | 18 | +17 | 45.45 |
| (Tunisia) Hatem Souisi | 1998 | 4 | 0 | 2 | 2 | 1 | 4 | −3 | 0.00 |
| (Malaysia) Abdul Rahman Ibrahim | 1998 – 2000 | 29 | 15 | 3 | 11 | 56 | 44 | +12 | 51.72 |
| (England) Allan Harris | 2001 – 2004 | 31 | 7 | 7 | 17 | 38 | 57 | −19 | 22.58 |
| (Malaysia) K. Rajagopal | 2004^{C} | 4 | 0 | 2 | 2 | 1 | 5 | −4 | 0.00 |
| (Hungary) Bertalan Bicskei | 2004 – 2005 | 18 | 9 | 1 | 8 | 28 | 27 | +1 | 50.00 |
| (Malaysia) Norizan Bakar | 2005 – 2007 | 18 | 4 | 5 | 9 | 23 | 28 | −5 | 22.22 |
| (Malaysia) B. Sathianathan | 2007 – 2008 | 13 | 5 | 4 | 4 | 29 | 19 | +10 | 38.46 |
| (Malaysia) K. Rajagopal | 2009 – 2013 | 52 | 14 | 15 | 23 | 65 | 76 | −11 | 26.92 |
| (Malaysia) Ong Kim Swee (caretaker) | 2014 | 3 | 1 | 2 | 0 | 2 | 1 | +1 | 33.33 |
| (Malaysia) Dollah Salleh | 2014 – 2015 | 18 | 4 | 4 | 10 | 19 | 46 | −27 | 22.22 |
| (Malaysia) Ong Kim Swee | 2015 – 2017 | 21 | 7 | 6 | 8 | 20 | 27 | −7 | 33.33 |
| (Portugal) Nelo Vingada | 2017 | 7 | 0 | 1 | 6 | 6 | 16 | −10 | 0.00 |
| (Malaysia) Tan Cheng Hoe | 2017 – 2022 | 40 | 20 | 4 | 16 | 74 | 53 | +21 | 50.00 |
| (South Korea) Kim Pan-gon | 2022 – 2024 | 35 | 19 | 7 | 9 | 74 | 37 | +37 | 54.29 |
| (Spain) Pau Martí (caretaker) | 2024 – 2025 | 9 | 4 | 3 | 2 | 12 | 13 | −1 | 44.44 |
| (Australia) Peter Cklamovski | 2025 – 2026 | 9 | 3 | 0 | 6 | 10 | 19 | −9 | 33.33 |
| (Malaysia) Tan Cheng Hoe (interim) | 2026 – present | 12 | 7 | 1 | 4 | 19 | 10 | +9 | 58.33 |

== Players ==
=== Current squad ===
The following players were called up for the November 2026 international friendly matches against China and Yemen in Guangzhou, China.

Caps and goals are correct as of 17 November 2026, after the match against Yemen.

| No. | Pos. | Player | Date of birth (age) | Caps | Goals | Club |
|---|---|---|---|---|---|---|
| 1 | GK | Suhaimi Husin | 9 August 1994 (age 32) | 0 | 0 | (Football Association of Malaysia) Terengganu |
| 23 | GK | Haziq Nadzli | 6 January 1998 (age 28) | 8 | 0 | (Football Association of Malaysia) Kuching City |
| 16 | GK | Haziq Aiman | 19 January 2005 (age 21) | 0 | 0 | (Football Association of Malaysia) Kuching City |
| 15 | DF | Safwan Mazlan | 24 January 2002 (age 24) | 5 | 0 | (Football Association of Malaysia) Terengganu |
| 2 | DF | Dominic Tan | 12 March 1997 (age 29) | 39 | 0 | (Football Association of Malaysia) Sabah |
| 18 | DF | Ariff Farhan | 14 July 1996 (age 30) | 4 | 0 | (Football Association of Malaysia) Kuching City |
| 6 | DF | Quentin Cheng | 20 November 1999 (age 27) | 20 | 0 | (Football Association of Malaysia) Selangor |
| 4 | DF | Rodney Celvin Akwensivie | 25 November 1996 (age 29) | 7 | 0 | (Football Association of Malaysia) Kuching City |
| 5 | DF | Ubaidullah Shamsul | 30 November 2003 (age 22) | 15 | 0 | (Football Association of Malaysia) Terengganu |
| 20 | DF | Azam Azmi | 12 February 2001 (age 25) | 14 | 0 | (Football Association of Malaysia) Terengganu |
| 21 | DF | Dion Cools | 4 June 1996 (age 30) | 43 | 6 | (Japan Football Association) Cerezo Osaka |
| 3 | DF | Daniel Ting | 1 December 1992 (age 33) | 22 | 1 | (Football Association of Thailand) Ratchaburi |
| 8 | MF | Syafiq Ahmad | 28 June 1995 (age 31) | 51 | 11 | (Football Association of Malaysia) Kuala Lumpur City |
| 13 | MF | Ryan Lambert | 21 September 1998 (age 28) | 2 | 0 | (Football Association of Malaysia) Kuching City |
| 14 | MF | Endrick | 7 March 1995 (age 31) | 30 | 2 | (Football Association of Malaysia) Star City |
| 24 | MF | Haziq Kutty Abba | 28 September 2004 (age 22) | 2 | 0 | (Football Association of Malaysia) Penang |
| 19 | FW | Romel Morales | 23 August 1997 (age 29) | 15 | 4 | (Football Association of Malaysia) Terengganu |
| 11 | FW | Fergus Tierney | 19 March 2003 (age 23) | 11 | 2 | (Cyprus Football Association) PAC Omonia 29M |
| 17 | FW | Paulo Josué | 13 March 1989 (age 37) | 42 | 14 | (Football Association of Malaysia) Kuala Lumpur City |
| 7 | FW | Richard Chin | 15 October 2002 (age 24) | 3 | 2 | (Scottish Football Association) Ross County |
| 22 | FW | Ramadhan Saifullah | 9 December 2000 (age 25) | 6 | 0 | (Football Association of Malaysia) Kuching City |
| 9 | FW | G. Pavithran | 10 January 2005 (age 21) | 12 | 1 | (Football Association of Malaysia) Terengganu |

The following players were placed on the stand by list in the event of any changes to the original call-up.

| Pos. | Player | Date of birth (age) | Caps | Goals | Club | Latest call-up |
|---|---|---|---|---|---|---|
| DF | Danial Amier | 27 March 1997 (age 29) | 4 | 0 | (Malaysia) Terengganu | |
| DF | Declan Lambert | 21 September 1998 (age 28) | 5 | 0 | (Malaysia) Kuching City | v. Vietnam, 31 March 2026 ^{PRE} |
| MF | Nazmi Faiz | 16 August 1994 (age 32) | 26 | 0 | (Malaysia) Kuching City | 2026 FIFA ASEAN Cup |
| MF | Aliff Haiqal | 11 July 2000 (age 26) | 7 | 0 | (Malaysia) Penang | 2026 ASEAN Championship |
| MF | Aliff Izwan | 10 February 2004 (age 22) | 1 | 0 | (Malaysia) Selangor | v. Nepal, 18 November 2025 |
| FW | Fayadh Zulkifli | 13 September 1998 (age 28) | 3 | 0 | (Malaysia) Sabah | |
| FW | Darren Lok | 14 December 1990 (age 35) | 38 | 6 | (Malaysia) Sabah | |
| FW | Haqimi Azim | 6 January 2003 (age 23) | 17 | 1 | (Malaysia) Penang | 2026 ASEAN Championship |
| FW | Luqman Hakim Shamsudin | 5 March 2002 (age 24) | 9 | 0 | (Malaysia) Negeri Sembilan | v. Vietnam, 31 March 2026 ^{PRE} |
| FW | Akhyar Rashid | 1 May 1999 (age 27) | 54 | 10 | (Malaysia) Negeri Sembilan | |
| FW | Danial Asri | 1 April 2000 (age 26) | 0 | 0 | (Brunei) DPMM | |

=== Recent call-ups ===
The following footballers were part of national selection in the past twelve months, but are not part of the current call-up.

| Pos. | Player | Date of birth (age) | Caps | Goals | Club | Latest call-up |
|---|---|---|---|---|---|---|
| GK | Sikh Izhan | 23 March 2002 (age 24) | 1 | 0 | (Malaysia) Selangor | November 2026 training camp ^{INJ} |
| GK | Azri Ghani | 30 April 1999 (age 27) | 8 | 0 | (Malaysia) Negeri Sembilan | 2026 FIFA ASEAN Cup |
| GK | Syihan Hazmi | 22 February 1996 (age 30) | 39 | 0 | (Malaysia) Johor Darul Ta'zim | 2026 FIFA ASEAN Cup |
| GK | Rahadiazli Rahalim | 28 May 2001 (age 25) | 1 | 0 | (Malaysia) Terengganu | 2026 ASEAN Championship |
| DF | Harith Haiqal | 22 June 2002 (age 24) | 15 | 1 | (Malaysia) Selangor | November 2026 training camp ^{INJ} |
| DF | Zikri Khalili | 25 June 2002 (age 24) | 0 | 0 | (Malaysia) Selangor | November 2026 training camp ^{INJ} |
| DF | Brad Tapp | 16 January 2001 (age 25) | 3 | 0 | (Malaysia) Johor Darul Ta'zim | 2026 FIFA ASEAN Cup |
| DF | Syahmi Safari | 5 February 1998 (age 28) | 29 | 1 | (Malaysia) Johor Darul Ta'zim | 2026 FIFA ASEAN Cup |
| DF | La'Vere Corbin-Ong | 22 April 1991 (age 35) | 52 | 6 | (Malaysia) Johor Darul Ta'zim | 2026 FIFA ASEAN Cup |
| DF | Faris Danish | 4 July 2006 (age 20) | 4 | 0 | (Malaysia) Johor Darul Ta'zim II | 2026 FIFA ASEAN Cup ^{INJ} |
| DF | V. Ruventhiran | 24 August 2001 (age 25) | 12 | 0 | (Malaysia) Melaka | 2026 ASEAN Championship |
| DF | Jimmy Raymond | 26 April 1996 (age 30) | 5 | 0 | (Malaysia) Kuching City | 2026 ASEAN Championship |
| DF | Alif Ahmad | 28 February 2003 (age 23) | 5 | 0 | (Malaysia) Johor Darul Ta'zim II | 2026 ASEAN Championship |
| DF | Aysar Hadi | 4 September 2003 (age 23) | 2 | 0 | (Malaysia) Johor Darul Ta'zim II | 2026 ASEAN Championship |
| DF | Ibrahim Manusi | 30 September 2001 (age 25) | 1 | 0 | (Malaysia) Kuala Lumpur City | 2026 ASEAN Championship |
| DF | Matthew Davies | 7 February 1995 (age 31) | 60 | 0 | (Malaysia) Johor Darul Ta'zim | v. Vietnam, 31 March 2026 |
| DF | Feroz Baharudin | 2 April 2000 (age 26) | 5 | 0 | (Malaysia) Johor Darul Ta'zim | v. Vietnam, 31 March 2026 |
| DF | Junior Eldstål | 16 September 1991 (age 35) | 23 | 0 | (Malaysia) Johor Darul Ta'zim | v. Vietnam, 31 March 2026 ^{PRE} |
| DF | Shahrul Saad | 8 July 1993 (age 33) | 63 | 5 | (Malaysia) Johor Darul Ta'zim | v. Laos, 14 October 2025 |
| MF | Safawi Rasid | 5 March 1997 (age 29) | 73 | 22 | (Malaysia) Kuching City | November 2026 training camp ^{WD} |
| MF | Nooa Laine | 22 November 2002 (age 24) | 24 | 0 | (Malaysia) Selangor | November 2026 training camp ^{INJ} |
| MF | Syahir Bashah | 16 September 2001 (age 25) | 2 | 1 | (Malaysia) Selangor | November 2026 training camp ^{INJ} |
| MF | Manuel Hidalgo | 3 May 1999 (age 27) | 4 | 0 | (Malaysia) Johor Darul Ta'zim | 2026 FIFA ASEAN Cup |
| MF | Hong Wan | 17 August 2000 (age 26) | 2 | 0 | (Malaysia) Johor Darul Ta'zim | 2026 FIFA ASEAN Cup |
| MF | Stuart Wilkin | 12 March 1998 (age 28) | 37 | 8 | (Malaysia) Johor Darul Ta'zim | 2026 FIFA ASEAN Cup |
| MF | Ezequiel Agüero | 7 April 1994 (age 32) | 25 | 3 | (Indonesia) PSM Makassar | 2026 FIFA ASEAN Cup ^{INJ} |
| MF | Daryl Sham | 30 November 2002 (age 23) | 7 | 0 | (Malaysia) Johor Darul Ta'zim II | 2026 ASEAN Championship |
| MF | Wan Kuzain | 14 September 1998 (age 28) | 4 | 1 | (United States) Sporting JAX | 2026 ASEAN Championship |
| MF | Ziad El Basheer | 24 December 2003 (age 22) | 2 | 0 | (Malaysia) Johor Darul Ta'zim II | 2026 ASEAN Championship |
| MF | Zhafri Yahya | 25 September 1994 (age 32) | 1 | 0 | (Malaysia) Kuala Lumpur City | 2026 ASEAN Championship ^{WD} |
| MF | Afiq Fazail | 29 September 1994 (age 32) | 9 | 0 | (Malaysia) Johor Darul Ta'zim | v. Laos, 14 October 2025 |
| FW | A. Selvan | 5 November 2000 (age 26) | 0 | 0 | (Malaysia) Selangor | November 2026 training camp ^{INJ} |
| FW | Faisal Halim | 7 January 1998 (age 28) | 43 | 18 | (Malaysia) Selangor | 2026 FIFA ASEAN Cup |
| FW | Bérgson | 9 February 1991 (age 35) | 4 | 4 | (Malaysia) Johor Darul Ta'zim | 2026 FIFA ASEAN Cup |
| FW | Arif Aiman | 4 May 2002 (age 24) | 43 | 10 | (Malaysia) Johor Darul Ta'zim | 2026 FIFA ASEAN Cup |
| FW | Mohamadou Sumareh | 20 September 1994 (age 32) | 39 | 7 | (Malaysia) Johor Darul Ta'zim | 2026 ASEAN Championship |
| FW | Fazrul Amir | 27 February 2000 (age 26) | 6 | 0 | (Malaysia) Kuala Lumpur City | 2026 ASEAN Championship |
| FW | Engku Nur Shakir | 16 October 1998 (age 28) | 5 | 0 | (Malaysia) Star City | 2026 ASEAN Championship |
| FW | Hadi Fayyadh | 22 January 2000 (age 26) | 1 | 0 | (Japan) Vencedor Mie United | 2026 ASEAN Championship |
| FW | Jordan Mintah | 2 September 1995 (age 31) | 0 | 0 | (Malaysia) Kuching City | v. Nepal 18 November 2025 ^{PRE} |
Notes: ^{INJ} = Player withdrew from the current squad due to injury.; ^{PRE} = Preliminary or stand-by squad.; ^{RET} = Player has retired from national team.; ^{WD} = Player withdrew from the current squad due to a non-injury issue.

== Player records ==
As of 14 October 2025
Players in bold are still active with Malaysia.
This list does not include players who represented Malaya (1948–1962).

=== Most appearances ===
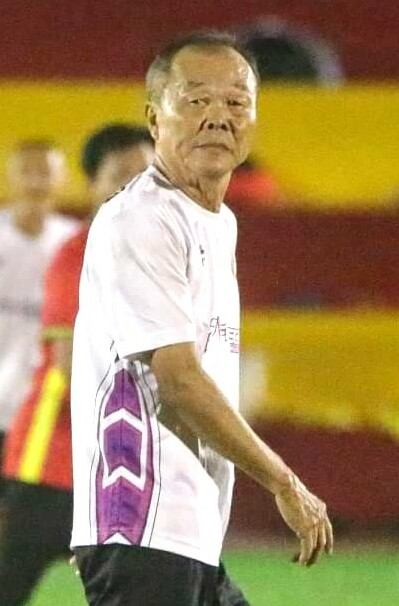
Soh Chin Ann is Malaysia's most capped player with 195 appearances.

| Rank | Player | Caps | Goals | Career |
|---|---|---|---|---|
| 1 | Soh Chin Ann | 195 | 13 | 1969–1984 |
| 2 | Shukor Salleh | 172 | 5 | 1970–1981 |
| 3 | Mokhtar Dahari | 142 | 89 | 1972–1985 |
| 3 | Arumugam Rengasamy | 142 | 0 | 1973–1986 |
| 5 | Zainal Abidin Hassan | 129 | 50 | 1980–1997 |
| 6 | Chandran Mutveeran | 122 | 2 | 1965–1974 |
| 7 | Santokh Singh | 119 | 7 | 1973–1984 |
| 8 | Aidil Zafuan | 98 | 3 | 2007–2022 |
| 9 | Namat Abdullah | 95 | 7 | 1968–1975 |
| 10 | Ahmad Yusof | 92 | 6 | 1981–1993 |

=== Top goalscorers ===
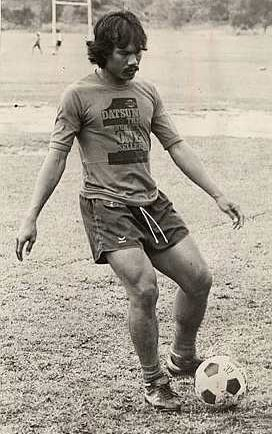
Mokhtar Dahari is Malaysia's top scorer with 89 goals.

| Rank | Player | Goals | Caps | Ratio | Career |
|---|---|---|---|---|---|
| 1 | Mokhtar Dahari | 89 | 142 | 0.63 | 1972–1985 |
| 2 | Zainal Abidin Hassan | 50 | 129 | 0.39 | 1980–1997 |
| 3 | Isa Bakar | 45 | 69 | 0.68 | 1974–1981 |
| 4 | Shaharuddin Abdullah | 39 | 70 | 0.56 | 1967–1974 |
| 5 | Dollah Salleh | 33 | 81 | 0.41 | 1985–1996 |
| 6 | James Wong | 23 | 36 | 0.64 | 1972–1981 |
| 6 | Safee Sali | 23 | 76 | 0.3 | 2006–2017 |
| 8 | **Safawi Rasid** | 22 | 72 | 0.31 | 2016–present |
| 9 | Thanabalan Nadarajah | 20 | 46 | 0.43 | 1964–1969 |
| 9 | Wong Choon Wah | 20 | 88 | 0.23 | 1968–1977 |

== Competitive record ==
Champion Runners-up Third place Fourth place

=== FIFA World Cup ===
| FIFA World Cup record | | | | | | | | | Qualification record | | | | | | |
| Year | Round | Position | Pld | W | D* | L | GF | GA | Round | Pld | W | D | L | GF | GA |
| as Malaya | | | | | | | | | as Malaya | | | | | | |
|---|---|---|---|---|---|---|---|---|---|---|---|---|---|---|---|
| (Uruguay) 1930 | Not a FIFA member | | | | | | | | Not a FIFA member | | | | | | |
| (Italy) 1934 | Not a FIFA member | | | | | | | | Not a FIFA member | | | | | | |
| (France) 1938 | Not a FIFA member | | | | | | | | Not a FIFA member | | | | | | |
| (Brazil) 1950 | Not a FIFA member | | | | | | | | Not a FIFA member | | | | | | |
| (Switzerland) 1954 | Not a FIFA member | | | | | | | | Not a FIFA member | | | | | | |
| (Sweden) 1958 | Did not enter | | | | | | | | Did not enter | | | | | | |
| (Chile) 1962 | Did not enter | | | | | | | | Did not enter | | | | | | |
| as Malaysia | | | | | | | | | as Malaysia | | | | | | |
| (England) 1966 | Did not enter | | | | | | | | Did not enter | | | | | | |
| (Mexico) 1970 | Did not enter | | | | | | | | Did not enter | | | | | | |
| (West Germany) 1974 | Did not qualify | | | | | | | | Round 1 | 4 | 1 | 1 | 2 | 2 | 4 |
| (Argentina) 1978 | Did not qualify | | | | | | | | Round 1 | 4 | 1 | 2 | 1 | 7 | 6 |
| (Spain) 1982 | Did not qualify | | | | | | | | Round 1 | 3 | 0 | 1 | 2 | 3 | 8 |
| (Mexico) 1986 | Did not qualify | | | | | | | | Round 1 | 4 | 2 | 1 | 1 | 6 | 2 |
| (Italy) 1990 | Did not qualify | | | | | | | | Round 1 | 6 | 3 | 1 | 2 | 8 | 8 |
| (United States) 1994 | Did not qualify | | | | | | | | Round 1 | 6 | 2 | 2 | 2 | 16 | 7 |
| (France) 1998 | Did not qualify | | | | | | | | Round 1 | 6 | 3 | 2 | 1 | 5 | 3 |
| (South Korea) (Japan) 2002 | Did not qualify | | | | | | | | Round 1 | 6 | 2 | 1 | 3 | 8 | 11 |
| (Germany) 2006 | Did not qualify | | | | | | | | Round 2 | 6 | 0 | 0 | 6 | 2 | 18 |
| (South Africa) 2010 | Did not qualify | | | | | | | | Round 1 | 2 | 0 | 1 | 1 | 1 | 4 |
| (Brazil) 2014 | Did not qualify | | | | | | | | Round 2 | 4 | 1 | 1 | 2 | 8 | 10 |
| (Russia) 2018 | Did not qualify | | | | | | | | Round 2 | 8 | 2 | 0 | 6 | 7 | 29 |
| (Qatar) 2022 | Did not qualify | | | | | | | | Round 2 | 10 | 6 | 0 | 4 | 22 | 14 |
| (Canada) (Mexico) (United States) 2026 | Did not qualify | | | | | | | | Round 2 | 6 | 3 | 1 | 2 | 9 | 9 |
| (Morocco) (Portugal) (Spain) 2030 | To be determined | | | | | | | | To be determined | | | | | | |
| (Saudi Arabia) 2034 | To be determined | | | | | | | | To be determined | | | | | | |
| Total | N/A | 0/18 | 0 | 0 | 0 | 0 | 0 | 0 | Best: Round 2 | 75 | 26 | 14 | 35 | 104 | 133 |

=== Olympic Games ===
| Olympic Games record | | | | | | | | | Qualification record | | | | | | |
| Year | Round | Position | Pld | W | D* | L | GF | GA | Round | Pld | W | D | L | GF | GA |
|---|---|---|---|---|---|---|---|---|---|---|---|---|---|---|---|
| (United Kingdom) 1948 | See Malaya national football team ^{1} | | | | | | | | See Malaya national football team ^{1} | | | | | | |
| (Finland) 1952 | See Malaya national football team ^{1} | | | | | | | | See Malaya national football team ^{1} | | | | | | |
| (Australia) 1956 | See Malaya national football team ^{1} | | | | | | | | See Malaya national football team ^{1} | | | | | | |
| (Italy) 1960 | See Malaya national football team ^{1} | | | | | | | | See Malaya national football team ^{1} | | | | | | |
| (Japan) 1964 | Did not qualify | | | | | | | | Preliminary round | 2 | 0 | 1 | 1 | 3 | 4 |
| (Mexico) 1968 | Withdrew | | | | | | | | Withdrew | | | | | | |
| (West Germany) 1972 | Round 1 | 10th of 16 | 3 | 1 | 0 | 2 | 3 | 9 | Group 1 ^{Q} | 4 | 4 | 0 | 0 | 12 | 0 |
| (Canada) 1976 | Did not qualify | | | | | | | | Group 2 | 4 | 2 | 0 | 2 | 17 | 5 |
| (Soviet Union) 1980 | Withdrew ^{B} | | | | | | | | Group 2 ^{Q} | 5 | 4 | 1 | 0 | 21 | 3 |
| (United States) 1984 | Did not qualify | | | | | | | | Second round | 12 | 6 | 3 | 3 | 16 | 10 |
| (South Korea) 1988 | Did not qualify | | | | | | | | First round | 2 | 0 | 1 | 1 | 2 | 3 |
| (Spain) 1992 – present | See Malaysia under-23 football team ^{2} | | | | | | | | See Malaysia under-23 football team ^{2} | | | | | | |
| Total | Appearance: 1 | Best: 10th | 3 | 1 | 0 | 2 | 3 | 9 | Best: Final stage | 29 | 16 | 6 | 7 | 71 | 25 |

=== AFC Asian Cup ===
| AFC Asian Cup record | | | | | | | | | Qualification record | | | | | | |
| Year | Round | Position | Pld | W | D* | L | GF | GA | Round | Pld | W | D | L | GF | GA |
|---|---|---|---|---|---|---|---|---|---|---|---|---|---|---|---|
| (Hong Kong) 1956 | See Malaya national football team ^{1} | | | | | | | | See Malaya national football team ^{1} | | | | | | |
| (South Korea) 1960 | See Malaya national football team ^{1} | | | | | | | | See Malaya national football team ^{1} | | | | | | |
| (Israel) 1964 | Did not qualify | | | | | | | | Group stage | 3 | 1 | 0 | 2 | 9 | 10 |
| (Iran) 1968 | Did not qualify | | | | | | | | Group stage | 4 | 1 | 1 | 2 | 4 | 5 |
| (Thailand) 1972 | Did not qualify | | | | | | | | Group stage | 5 | 4 | 0 | 1 | 15 | 3 |
| (Iran) 1976 | Group stage | 5th of 6 | 2 | 0 | 1 | 1 | 1 | 3 | Group stage ^{Q} | 4 | 3 | 1 | 0 | 6 | 1 |
| (Kuwait) 1980 | Group stage | 6th of 10 | 4 | 1 | 2 | 1 | 5 | 5 | Group stage ^{Q} | 5 | 2 | 2 | 1 | 8 | 4 |
| (Singapore) 1984 | Did not qualify | | | | | | | | Group stage | 4 | 2 | 1 | 1 | 10 | 3 |
| (Qatar) 1988 | Did not qualify | | | | | | | | Group stage | 4 | 1 | 1 | 2 | 4 | 6 |
| (Japan) 1992 | Did not qualify | | | | | | | | Group stage | 3 | 0 | 2 | 1 | 2 | 6 |
| (United Arab Emirates) 1996 | Did not qualify | | | | | | | | Group stage | 2 | 1 | 1 | 0 | 5 | 2 |
| (Lebanon) 2000 | Did not qualify | | | | | | | | Group stage | 6 | 2 | 1 | 3 | 12 | 13 |
| (China) 2004 | Did not qualify | | | | | | | | Group stage | 6 | 1 | 2 | 3 | 9 | 12 |
| (Indonesia) (Malaysia) (Thailand) (Vietnam) 2007 | Group stage | 16th of 16 | 3 | 0 | 0 | 3 | 1 | 12 | Qualified as co-hosts | | | | | | |
| (Qatar) 2011 | Did not qualify | | | | | | | | Group stage | 4 | 0 | 0 | 4 | 2 | 12 |
| (Australia) 2015 | Did not qualify | | | | | | | | Group stage | 6 | 2 | 1 | 3 | 5 | 7 |
| (United Arab Emirates) 2019 | Did not qualify | | | | | | | | Third round | 14 | 1 | 2 | 11 | 8 | 45 |
| (Qatar) 2023 | Group stage | 21st of 24 | 3 | 0 | 1 | 2 | 3 | 8 | Third round ^{Q} | 13 | 8 | 0 | 5 | 30 | 18 |
| (Saudi Arabia) 2027 | Did not qualify | | | | | | | | Third round | 12 | 6 | 1 | 5 | 19 | 19 |
| Total | Appearances: 4 | Best: 5th | 9 | 1 | 3 | 5 | 7 | 20 | Best: Third round | 94 | 35 | 16 | 43 | 148 | 166 |

=== FIFA ASEAN Cup ===
FIFA ASEAN Cup record
| Year | Round | Position | Pld | W | D | L | GF | GA |
|---|---|---|---|---|---|---|---|---|
| (Indonesia) 2026 | Third place | 3rd of 8 | 4 | 3 | 1 | 0 | 10 | 0 |
| Total | Appearances: 1 | Best: 3rd | 4 | 3 | 1 | 0 | 10 | 0 |

=== ASEAN Championship ===
ASEAN Championship record
| Year | Round | Position | Pld | W | D* | L | GF | GA |
|---|---|---|---|---|---|---|---|---|
| (Singapore) 1996 | Runners-up | 2nd of 10 | 6 | 3 | 2 | 1 | 18 | 4 |
| (Vietnam) 1998 | Group stage | 6th of 8 | 3 | 0 | 1 | 2 | 0 | 3 |
| (Thailand) 2000 | Third place | 3rd of 9 | 6 | 4 | 1 | 1 | 12 | 4 |
| (Indonesia) (Singapore) 2002 | Fourth place | 4th of 9 | 5 | 2 | 1 | 2 | 9 | 5 |
| (Vietnam) (Malaysia) 2004 ^{3} | Third place | 3rd of 10 | 7 | 5 | 0 | 2 | 14 | 9 |
| (Singapore) (Thailand) 2007 | Fourth place | 4th of 8 | 5 | 1 | 3 | 1 | 6 | 3 |
| (Indonesia) (Thailand) 2008 | Group stage | 5th of 8 | 3 | 1 | 0 | 2 | 5 | 6 |
| (Indonesia) (Vietnam) 2010 | Champions | 1st of 8 | 7 | 3 | 2 | 2 | 12 | 8 |
| (Malaysia) (Thailand) 2012 | Fourth place | 4th of 8 | 5 | 2 | 1 | 2 | 7 | 7 |
| (Singapore) (Vietnam) 2014 | Runners-up | 2nd of 8 | 7 | 3 | 1 | 3 | 13 | 12 |
| (Myanmar) (Philippines) 2016 | Group stage | 5th of 8 | 3 | 1 | 0 | 2 | 3 | 4 |
| (ASEAN) 2018 | Runners-up | 2nd of 10 | 8 | 3 | 3 | 2 | 11 | 8 |
| (Singapore) 2020 | Group stage | 6th of 10 | 4 | 2 | 0 | 2 | 8 | 8 |
| (ASEAN) 2022 | Semi-finals | 3rd of 10 | 6 | 4 | 0 | 2 | 11 | 7 |
| (ASEAN) 2024 | Group stage | 5th of 10 | 4 | 1 | 2 | 1 | 5 | 5 |
| (ASEAN) 2026 | Semi-finals | 4th of 10 | 6 | 3 | 0 | 3 | 7 | 7 |
| Total | 1 Title | 16/16 | 85 | 38 | 17 | 30 | 141 | 100 |

ASEAN Championship history
| First Match | Singapore 1–1 Malaysia (1 September 1996; Kallang, Singapore) |
| Last Match | Malaysia 0–0 Singapore (20 December 2024; Kuala Lumpur, Malaysia) |
| Biggest Win | Malaysia 7–0 Philippines (4 September 1996; Kallang, Singapore) |
| Biggest Defeat | Indonesia 5–1 Malaysia (1 December 2010; Jakarta, Indonesia) |
| Best Result | Champions in 2010 |
| Worst Result | Group stage in 1998, 2008, 2016, 2020, 2024 |

=== Asian Games ===
Asian Games record ^{C}
| Year | Round | Position | Pld | W | D* | L | GF | GA |
|---|---|---|---|---|---|---|---|---|
| (India) 1951 | See Malaya national football team ^{1} | | | | | | | |
| (Philippines) 1954 | See Malaya national football team ^{1} | | | | | | | |
| (Japan) 1958 | See Malaya national football team ^{1} | | | | | | | |
| (Indonesia) 1962 | See Malaya national football team ^{1} | | | | | | | |
| (Thailand) 1966 | Group stage | 10th of 11 | 3 | 0 | 0 | 3 | 1 | 4 |
| (Thailand) 1970 | Group stage | 10th of 10 | 3 | 0 | 0 | 3 | 0 | 4 |
| (Iran) 1974 | Bronze medalists | 3rd of 15 | 7 | 3 | 2 | 2 | 20 | 13 |
| (Thailand) 1978 | Semi-finals | 7th of 14 | 5 | 2 | 0 | 3 | 4 | 10 |
| (India) 1982 | Group stage | 14th of 16 | 3 | 0 | 0 | 3 | 1 | 4 |
| (South Korea) 1986 | Group stage | 15th of 18 | 3 | 0 | 1 | 2 | 2 | 5 |
| (China) 1990 | Group stage | 12th of 14 | 2 | 0 | 1 | 1 | 0 | 3 |
| (Japan) 1994 | Group stage | 11th of 18 | 4 | 1 | 1 | 2 | 6 | 11 |
| (Thailand) 1998 | Did not enter | | | | | | | |
| (South Korea) 2002 – present | See Malaysia national under-23 football team ^{2} | | | | | | | |
| Total | Appearances: 8 | Best: 3rd | 30 | 6 | 5 | 19 | 34 | 54 |

Asian Games history
| First Match | Iran 2–0 Malaysia (10 December 1966; Bangkok, Thailand) |
| Last Match | Malaysia 1–2 Saudi Arabia (7 October 1994; Hiroshima, Japan) |
| Biggest Win | Malaysia 11–0 Philippines (7 September 1974; Tehran, Iran) |
| Biggest Defeat | Israel 8–3 Malaysia (3 September 1974; Tehran, Iran) |
| Best Result | Bronze medalists in 1974 |
| Worst Result | Group stage in 1970 |

=== Southeast Asian Games ===
Southeast Asian Games record ^{C}
| Year | Round | Position | Pld | W | D* | L | GF | GA |
|---|---|---|---|---|---|---|---|---|
| (Thailand) 1959 ^{5} | See Malaya national football team ^{1} | | | | | | | |
| (Myanmar) 1961 ^{5} | See Malaya national football team ^{1} | | | | | | | |
| (Cambodia) 1963 ^{5} | Not held | | | | | | | |
| (Malaysia) 1965 ^{5} | Semi-finals | 4th of 5 | 2 | 0 | 0 | 2 | 0 | 4 |
| (Thailand) 1967 ^{5} | Group stage | 5th of 5 | 2 | 0 | 0 | 2 | 1 | 6 |
| (Myanmar) 1969 ^{5} | Bronze medalists ^{S} | 3rd of 5 | 3 | 2 | 0 | 1 | 4 | 5 |
| (Malaysia) 1971 ^{5} | Silver medalists | 2nd of 7 | 5 | 4 | 0 | 1 | 16 | 6 |
| (Singapore) 1973 ^{5} | Bronze medalists | 3rd of 6 | 4 | 1 | 2 | 1 | 4 | 2 |
| (Thailand) 1975 ^{5} | Silver medalists | 2nd of 4 | 3 | 1 | 1 | 1 | 3 | 3 |
| (Malaysia) 1977 | Gold medalists | 1st of 7 | 5 | 4 | 0 | 1 | 24 | 3 |
| (Indonesia) 1979 | Gold medalists | 1st of 5 | 5 | 3 | 2 | 0 | 4 | 0 |
| (Philippines) 1981 | Silver medalists | 2nd of 6 | 4 | 1 | 2 | 1 | 4 | 5 |
| (Singapore) 1983 | Bronze medalists | 3rd of 7 | 4 | 1 | 2 | 1 | 7 | 3 |
| (Indonesia) 1985 | Bronze medalists | 3rd of 6 | 4 | 2 | 2 | 0 | 10 | 3 |
| (Thailand) 1987 | Silver medalists | 2nd of 6 | 4 | 1 | 2 | 1 | 4 | 3 |
| (Malaysia) 1989 | Gold medalists | 1st of 8 | 5 | 5 | 0 | 0 | 11 | 2 |
| (Philippines) 1991 | Group stage | 5th of 7 | 3 | 1 | 0 | 2 | 2 | 4 |
| (Singapore) 1993 | Group stage | 5th of 9 | 4 | 2 | 0 | 2 | 13 | 5 |
| (Thailand) 1995 | Group stage | 7th of 10 | 4 | 1 | 1 | 2 | 9 | 5 |
| (Indonesia) 1997 | Group stage | 7th of 10 | 4 | 2 | 0 | 2 | 5 | 5 |
| (Brunei) 1999 | Group stage | 5th of 10 | 4 | 2 | 0 | 2 | 10 | 10 |
| (Malaysia) 2001 – present | See Malaysia national under-23 football team ^{2} | | | | | | | |
| Total | Appearances: 18 | Best: 1st | 69 | 33 | 14 | 22 | 131 | 74 |

Southeast Asian Games history
| First Match | Malaysia 0–2 Burma (18 December 1965; Kuala Lumpur, Malaysia) |
| Last Match | Brunei 0–2 Malaysia (6 August 1999; Bandar Seri Begawan, Brunei) |
| Biggest Win | Malaysia 9–0 Laos (30 July 1993; Singapore); Malaysia 9–0 Cambodia (10 December 1995; Chiang Mai, Thailand) |
| Biggest Defeat | Indonesia 6–0 Malaysia (12 August 1999; Bandar Seri Begawan, Brunei) |
| Best Result | Champions in 1977, 1979, 1989 |
| Worst Result | Group stage in 1967 |

- ^{*} : Denotes draws include knockout matches decided via penalty shoot-out.
- ^{1} : Represented in the competition by Malaya national football team.
- ^{2} : Represented in the competition by Malaysia national under-23 football team.
- ^{3} : Not a FIFA 'A' international competition.
- ^{4} : Represented in the competition by Malaysia national under-22 football team.
- ^{5} : Previously known as Southeast Asian Peninsular Games (SEAP Games).
- ^{B} : Qualified to the final round, but boycotted the tournament.
- ^{C} : These matches are not regarded as part of the national team's record, nor are caps awarded.
- ^{Q} : Qualified to the final round of participating tournament
- ^{S} : Shared the medal

Notes:

- Red border colour indicates tournament was held on home soil

== Head-to-head record ==
Last update was against Yemen on 17 November 2026.

Malaysia national football team head-to-head records
| Opponents | Pld | W | D | L | GF | GA | GD | Confederation | Last Match |
| Afghanistan | 3 | 2 | 1 | 0 | 9 | 2 | +7 | AFC | 23 March 2019; Friendly |
| Algeria | 2 | 0 | 2 | 0 | 1 | 1 | 0 | CAF | 23 August 1986; Friendly |
| Australia | 8 | 1 | 0 | 7 | 1 | 22 | −21 | AFC | 7 October 2011; Friendly |
| Bahrain | 13 | 2 | 3 | 8 | 14 | 25 | −10 | AFC | 20 January 2024; 2023 AFC Asian Cup |
| Bangladesh | 11 | 8 | 2 | 1 | 23 | 4 | +19 | AFC | 25 September 2026; 2026 FIFA ASEAN Cup |
| Bhutan | 1 | 1 | 0 | 0 | 7 | 0 | +7 | AFC | 1 April 2018; Friendly |
| Bosnia and Herzegovina | 2 | 0 | 1 | 1 | 2 | 3 | −1 | UEFA | 27 June 2001; 2001 Merdeka Tournament |
| Brazil | 1 | 0 | 0 | 1 | 0 | 4 | −4 | CONMEBOL | 25 May 2002; Friendly |
| Brunei | 11 | 11 | 0 | 0 | 46 | 2 | +43 | AFC | 27 May 2022; Friendly |
| Bulgaria | 1 | 0 | 1 | 0 | 1 | 1 | 0 | UEFA | 30 January 1999; 1999 Dunhill Cup |
| Cambodia | 30 | 22 | 4 | 4 | 90 | 29 | +61 | AFC | 8 December 2024; 2024 ASEAN Championship |
| Canada | 1 | 0 | 0 | 1 | 0 | 5 | −5 | CONCACAF | 25 August 1986; Merlion Cup |
| Cape Verde | 1 | 0 | 1 | 0 | 1 | 1 | 0 | CAF | 29 May 2025; Friendly |
| China | 17 | 1 | 4 | 12 | 4 | 35 | −31 | AFC | 14 November 2026; Friendly |
| Chinese Taipei | 13 | 8 | 2 | 3 | 26 | 13 | +13 | AFC | 11 June 2024; 2026 FIFA World Cup qualification |
| Czechoslovakia | 1 | 1 | 0 | 0 | 3 | 0 | +3 | UEFA | 27 August 1986; Merdeka Tournament |
| England | 1 | 0 | 0 | 1 | 2 | 4 | −2 | UEFA | 12 June 1991; Friendly |
| Fiji | 5 | 2 | 1 | 2 | 5 | 8 | −3 | OFC | 5 July 2018; Friendly |
| Finland | 1 | 1 | 0 | 0 | 2 | 1 | +1 | UEFA | 21 February 1997; 1997 Dunhill Cup |
| West Germany | 1 | 0 | 0 | 1 | 0 | 3 | −3 | UEFA | 29 August 1972; Summer Olympic |
| Hong Kong | 31 | 15 | 9 | 7 | 48 | 33 | +15 | AFC | 28 March 2023; Friendly |
| India | 26 | 11 | 8 | 7 | 50 | 30 | +20 | AFC | 18 November 2024; Friendly |
| Indonesia | 98 | 36 | 22 | 40 | 108 | 122 | −14 | AFC | 28 September 2026; 2026 FIFA ASEAN Cup |
| Iran | 5 | 0 | 0 | 5 | 0 | 11 | −11 | AFC | 18 July 2007; 2007 AFC Asian Cup |
| Iraq | 8 | 0 | 3 | 5 | 3 | 14 | −11 | AFC | 20 October 2003; 2004 Asian Cup qualification |
| Israel | 2 | 0 | 0 | 2 | 3 | 11 | −8 | UEFA, AFC | 3 September 1974; Asian Games |
| Jamaica | 1 | 0 | 0 | 1 | 0 | 2 | −2 | CONCACAF | 28 June 2007; Friendly |
| Japan | 26 | 10 | 7 | 9 | 43 | 40 | +3 | AFC | 7 February 2004; Friendly |
| Jordan | 6 | 0 | 2 | 4 | 0 | 10 | −10 | AFC | 15 January 2024; 2023 AFC Asian Cup |
| Kenya | 1 | 0 | 1 | 0 | 0 | 0 | 0 | CAF | 12 August 2009; Friendly |
| Kyrgyzstan | 3 | 1 | 1 | 1 | 5 | 5 | 0 | AFC | 6 June 2024; 2026 FIFA World Cup qualification |
| Kuwait | 13 | 3 | 1 | 9 | 9 | 32 | –23 | AFC | 8 November 2013; Friendly |
| Laos | 18 | 15 | 2 | 1 | 64 | 8 | +56 | AFC | 28 July 2026; 2026 ASEAN Championship |
| Lesotho | 2 | 2 | 0 | 0 | 9 | 0 | +9 | CAF | 11 September 2009; Friendly |
| Liberia | 1 | 1 | 0 | 0 | 3 | 1 | +2 | CAF | 27 August 1984; Merdeka Tournament |
| Libya | 2 | 0 | 2 | 0 | 2 | 2 | 0 | CAF | 30 September 1980; Islamic Games |
| Liechtenstein | 1 | 0 | 0 | 1 | 0 | 1 | −1 | UEFA | 5 October 1981; Friendly |
| Lebanon | 3 | 1 | 0 | 2 | 3 | 4 | −1 | AFC | 8 September 2024; 2024 Merdeka Tournament |
| Macau | 3 | 2 | 1 | 0 | 14 | 0 | +14 | AFC | 28 March 2016; Friendly |
| Maldives | 6 | 5 | 0 | 1 | 14 | 2 | +12 | AFC | 14 December 2022; Friendly |
| Mongolia | 1 | 0 | 1 | 0 | 2 | 2 | 0 | AFC | 22 March 2018; Friendly |
| Morocco | 4 | 1 | 1 | 2 | 4 | 9 | -5 | CAF | 7 February 1981; Friendly |
| Myanmar | 53 | 26 | 8 | 19 | 92 | 68 | +24 | AFC | 25 July 2026; 2026 ASEAN Championship |
| Nepal | 10 | 8 | 1 | 1 | 26 | 4 | +22 | AFC | 18 November 2025; 2027 Asian Cup qualification |
| New Caledonia | 1 | 1 | 0 | 0 | 2 | 1 | +1 | OFC | 26 June 2016; Friendly |
| New Zealand | 14 | 2 | 2 | 10 | 9 | 35 | −26 | OFC | 14 October 2024; Friendly |
| North Korea | 8 | 1 | 3 | 4 | 5 | 14 | −9 | AFC | 13 November 2017; 2019 Asian Cup qualification |
| Oman | 9 | 2 | 1 | 6 | 6 | 17 | –11 | AFC | 26 March 2024; 2026 FIFA World Cup qualification |
| Pakistan | 4 | 3 | 0 | 1 | 15 | 4 | +11 | AFC | 10 Oct 2008; Friendly |
| Palestine | 5 | 2 | 0 | 3 | 5 | 16 | −11 | AFC | 8 September 2025; Friendly |
| Papua New Guinea | 5 | 4 | 0 | 1 | 29 | 3 | +26 | OFC | 20 June 2023; Friendly |
| Philippines | 17 | 13 | 3 | 1 | 62 | 4 | +58 | AFC | 8 August 2026; 2026 ASEAN Championship |
| Qatar | 6 | 0 | 3 | 3 | 3 | 11 | −8 | AFC | 19 November 2013; 2015 Asian Cup qualification |
| Saudi Arabia | 10 | 1 | 2 | 7 | 8 | 21 | −13 | AFC | 24 March 2016; 2018 FIFA World Cup qualification |
| Senegal | 1 | 1 | 0 | 0 | 1 | 0 | +1 | CAF | 13 August 1982; Merdeka Tournament |
| Singapore | 52 | 22 | 17 | 14 | 87 | 58 | +29 | AFC | 1 October 2026; 2026 FIFA ASEAN Cup |
| Slovakia | 1 | 0 | 0 | 1 | 0 | 2 | −2 | UEFA | 23 June 2001; 2001 Merdeka Tournament |
| Solomon Islands | 1 | 1 | 0 | 0 | 4 | 1 | +3 | OFC | 14 June 2023; Friendly |
| South Korea | 55 | 11 | 10 | 34 | 50 | 101 | −51 | AFC | 25 January 2024; 2023 AFC Asian Cup |
| South Vietnam | 13 | 7 | 3 | 3 | 27 | 15 | +12 | AFC | 23 March 1975; 1976 Asian Cup qualification |
| Sri Lanka | 9 | 8 | 0 | 1 | 33 | 7 | +26 | AFC | 5 October 2019; Friendly |
| Sweden | 1 | 0 | 0 | 1 | 1 | 3 | −2 | UEFA | 14 November 1979; Friendly |
| Switzerland | 1 | 0 | 0 | 1 | 0 | 2 | –2 | UEFA | 13 February 1981; Friendly |
| Syria | 6 | 2 | 2 | 2 | 12 | 10 | +2 | AFC | 6 September 2023; Friendly |
| Tajikistan | 4 | 1 | 1 | 2 | 2 | 6 | −4 | AFC | 17 October 2023; 2023 Merdeka Tournament |
| Thailand | 108 | 41 | 34 | 33 | 153 | 147 | +6 | AFC | 1 August 2026; 2026 ASEAN Championship |
| Timor-Leste | 7 | 6 | 1 | 0 | 25 | 5 | +20 | AFC | 11 December 2024; 2024 ASEAN Championship |
| Turkey | 1 | 0 | 0 | 1 | 0 | 3 | −3 | UEFA | 5 October 1980 Islamic Games |
| Turkmenistan | 2 | 2 | 0 | 0 | 4 | 1 | +3 | AFC | 23 March 2023; Friendly |
| United Arab Emirates | 10 | 2 | 0 | 8 | 6 | 28 | −22 | AFC | 4 June 2021; 2022 FIFA World Cup qualification |
| United States | 1 | 1 | 0 | 0 | 3 | 0 | +3 | CONCACAF | 29 August 1972; Summer Olympics |
| Uruguay | 1 | 0 | 0 | 1 | 0 | 6 | −6 | CONMEBOL | 1 June 1985; Friendly |
| Uzbekistan | 7 | 0 | 0 | 7 | 3 | 26 | −23 | AFC | 9 October 2021; Friendly |
| Vietnam | 28 | 6 | 3 | 19 | 19 | 44 | −25 | AFC | 5 October 2026; 2026 FIFA ASEAN Cup |
| Yemen | 5 | 4 | 0 | 1 | 7 | 4 | +3 | AFC | 17 November 2026; Friendly |
| Zimbabwe | 2 | 2 | 0 | 0 | 5 | 0 | +5 | CAF | 14 July 2009; Friendly |
| Total | 841 | 342 | 177 | 325 | 1309 | 1168 | +141 | | |

=== Regional record ===
Last meet up against Southeast Asia countries
| Opponents | Date | Score | Outcome | Match type |
| Brunei | 27 May 2022 | 4−0 | Won | Friendly |
| Cambodia | 8 December 2024 | 2−2 | Draw | 2024 ASEAN Championship |
| Indonesia | 28 September 2026 | 0−0 | Draw | 2026 FIFA ASEAN Cup |
| Laos | 28 July 2026 | 4−0 | Won | 2026 ASEAN Championship |
| Myanmar | 25 July 2026 | 1−2 | Won | 2026 ASEAN Championship |
| Philippines | 8 August 2026 | 1−0 | Won | 2026 ASEAN Championship |
| Singapore | 1 October 2026 | 6–0 | Won | 2026 FIFA ASEAN Cup |
| Thailand | 1 August 2026 | 2–0 | Lost | 2026 ASEAN Championship |
| Timor-Leste | 11 December 2024 | 3−2 | Won | 2024 ASEAN Championship |
| Vietnam | 5 October 2026 | 1–0 | Won | 2026 FIFA ASEAN Cup |

== FIFA ranking ==
Last update was on 21 December 2024. Source:

Worst Ranking Best Ranking Worst Mover Best Mover

Malaysia's FIFA world rankings
| Rank | Year | Games Played | Won | Draw | Lost | Best | | Worst | |
| Rank | Year | Games Played | Won | Draw | Lost | Rank | Move | Rank | Move |
|---|---|---|---|---|---|---|---|---|---|
| 132 | 2024 | 16 | 5 | 5 | 6 | 132 | ▲ +2 | 138 | ▼ –8 |
| 130 | 2023 | 13 | 9 | 2 | 2 | 130 | ▲ +15 | 137 | ▼ –3 |
| 145 | 2022 | 14 | 9 | 2 | 3 | 145 | ▲ +9 | 154 | 0 |
| 154 | 2021 | 10 | 3 | 0 | 7 | 153 | ▲ +1 | 155 | ▼ –1 |
| 153 | 2020 | 0 | 0 | 0 | 0 | 153 | ▲ +1 | 154 | 0 |
| 154 | 2019 | 13 | 9 | 0 | 4 | 154 | ▲ +9 | 168 | ▼ –1 |
| 178 | 2018 | 17 | 8 | 4 | 5 | 167 | ▲ +12 | 178 | ▼ –4 |
| 174 | 2017 | 8 | 0 | 2 | 6 | 155 | ▲ +4 | 174 | ▼ –12 |
| 161 | 2016 | 14 | 5 | 4 | 5 | 156 | ▲ +9 | 174 | ▼ –8 |
| 170 | 2015 | 11 | 2 | 3 | 6 | 153 | ▲ +4 | 171 | ▼ –11 |
| 154 | 2014 | 15 | 5 | 3 | 7 | 141 | ▲ +9 | 156 | ▼ –8 |
| 154 | 2013 | 11 | 1 | 1 | 9 | 154 | ▲ +4 | 164 | ▼ –5 |
| 158 | 2012 | 17 | 6 | 6 | 5 | 148 | ▲ +5 | 163 | ▼ –6 |
| 148 | 2011 | 10 | 3 | 3 | 4 | 138 | ▲ +7 | 155 | ▼ –6 |
| 144 | 2010 | 10 | 4 | 2 | 4 | 139 | ▲ +3 | 159 | ▼ –5 |
| 160 | 2009 | 12 | 4 | 3 | 5 | 150 | ▲ +5 | 163 | ▼ –8 |
| 156 | 2008 | 13 | 6 | 3 | 4 | 151 | ▲ +9 | 170 | ▼ –6 |
| 159 | 2007 | 13 | 3 | 3 | 7 | 149 | ▲ +7 | 166 | ▼ –7 |
| 152 | 2006 | 7 | 1 | 3 | 3 | 124 | ▲ +1 | 153 | ▼ –19 |
| 123 | 2005 | 7 | 2 | 1 | 4 | 111 | ▲ +6 | 123 | ▼ –7 |
| 120 | 2004 | 16 | 7 | 0 | 9 | 114 | ▲ +4 | 122 | ▼ –4 |
| 116 | 2003 | 7 | 1 | 3 | 3 | 99 | ▲ +21 | 119 | ▼ –11 |
| 128 | 2002 | 11 | 3 | 3 | 5 | 111 | ▲ +1 | 128 | ▼ –6 |
| 111 | 2001 | 9 | 3 | 1 | 5 | 105 | ▲ +3 | 111 | ▼ –3 |
| 107 | 2000 | 20 | 10 | 3 | 7 | 104 | ▲ +8 | 117 | ▼ –3 |
| 117 | 1999 | 8 | 4 | 0 | 4 | 113 | ▲ +2 | 118 | ▼ –3 |
| 113 | 1998 | 4 | 0 | 2 | 2 | 88 | ▲ +3 | 113 | ▼ –11 |
| 87 | 1997 | 14 | 6 | 3 | 5 | 84 | ▲ +13 | 97 | ▼ –3 |
| 96 | 1996 | 8 | 4 | 3 | 1 | 91 | ▲ +21 | 112 | ▼ –10 |
| 106 | 1995 | 6 | 2 | 1 | 3 | 94 | ▲ +14 | 117 | ▼ –23 |
| 89 | 1994 | 5 | 1 | 1 | 3 | 84 | ▲ +8 | 95 | ▼ –6 |
| 75 | 1993 | 11 | 4 | 3 | 4 | 75 | ▲ +16 | 79 | ▼ –2 |

Notes

- Table above is a list of all FIFA 'A' international matches Malaysia have played against FIFA recognised teams.

== Honours ==
=== Continental ===
- Asian Games
  - Bronze medal (1): 1974

=== Regional ===
- FIFA ASEAN Cup
  - Third place (1): 2026
- ASEAN Championship
  - Champions (1): 2010
  - Runners-up (3): 1996, 2014, 2018
  - Third place (2): 2000, 2004
- Southeast Asian Games
  - Gold medal (4): 1961, 1977, 1979, 1989
  - Silver medal (4): 1971, 1975, 1981, 1987
  - Bronze medal (4): 1969, 1973, 1983, 1985

=== Friendly ===
- Merdeka Tournament (8): 1968, 1973, 1974, 1976, 1979^{s}, 1986, 1993, 2024
- King's Cup (4): 1972, 1976^{s}, 1977^{s}, 1978
  - Runners-up (4): 1965, 1966, 1973, 2022
  - Third place (2): 1970, 1974
- Jakarta Anniversary Tournament (1): 1970
  - Runners-up (1): 1975
- South Vietnam Independence Cup (1): 1971
- Indonesian Independence Cup (1): 1992
- Korea Cup
  - Third place (1): 1977^{s}
- AirMarine Cup
  - Third place (1): 2019
- Tri-Nations Series
  - Runners-up (1): 2022

=== Awards ===
- ASEAN Championship Fair Play Award (4): 2000, 2012, 2018, 2022

Notes

- ^{s} Shared titles.

== See also ==
- Malaysia national football team results
- Malaysia national under-23 football team
- Malaysia national under-22 football team
- Malaysia national under-19 football team
- Malaysia national under-16 football team
- Malaysia women's national football team
- Malaysia national futsal team
- Malaysia women's national futsal team
- Malaysia League XI
- Football Association of Malaysia
- List of Malaysia footballers born outside Malaysia

== Notes ==
Achievements
| Preceded by 1975 Thailand | SEA Games Champions; 1977 (Second title); 1979 (Third title) | Succeeded by 1981 Thailand |
| Preceded by 1987 Indonesia | SEA Games Champions; 1989 (Fourth title) | Succeeded by 1991 Indonesia |
| Preceded by 2008 Vietnam | ASEAN Champions; 2010 (First title) | Succeeded by 2012 Singapore |
