= Peter Velappan =

Malaysian association football administrator (1935–2018)

Personal information
- Date of birth: 1 October 1935
- Date of death: 20 October 2018 (aged 83)

Managerial career
- Years: Team
- 1968–1968: Malaysia national football team

Dato' Peter Velappan (1 October 1935 – 20 October 2018) was a Malaysian association football administrator who served as the General Secretary of the Asian Football Confederation from 1978 to 2007.

== Biography ==
Peter Velappan was born in 1935. He studied at the University of Birmingham, Loughborough College in the United Kingdom, and McGill University in Canada. He began his career as a teacher in Seremban, Negeri Sembilan, before joining the Asian Football Confederation (AFC) in 1954. From 1963 to 1980, he served as Assistant Secretary of the Football Association of Malaysia (FAM), during which he played a key role in introducing professionalism to Malaysian football. In 1972, as team manager and coach, he led the national team to qualify for the 1972 Olympics in Munich.

In 1978, Velappan was appointed General Secretary of the AFC. He oversaw the entry of many member countries into the AFC during his tenure, which also saw Asia host its first ever FIFA World Cup. He was Coordination Director of the Organising Committee of the 2002 FIFA World Cup in South Korea and Japan. He served under three AFC presidents: Malaysians Hamzah Abu Samah (1978–1994), Sultan Ahmad Shah (1994–2002) and Mohamed bin Hammam from Qatar (2002–2007). Velappan retired in 2007.

Velappan remained as Project Director of Vision Asia, a program devoted to popularising football at the grassroots level in Asia and raising the standards of performance to compete with the rest of the world. He died on 20 October 2018, aged 83.

== Views ==
Velappan was known for his outspoken views on the development of Asian football. He famously criticised Asian footballers for their lack of fitness in 2001.

He also had a difficult working relationship with AFC President Mohamed bin Hammam towards the end of his tenure as general secretary, after the latter suggested moving the AFC headquarters away from Kuala Lumpur. He campaigned against Bin Hammam during the election for AFC's seat on the FIFA Executive Committee in 2009, backing Shaikh Salman Bin Ibrahim Al-Khalifa from Bahrain. Bin Hammam barely won the election. Velappan also publicly slammed Bin Hammam's candidacy during the 2011 FIFA presidential election, citing Bin Hammam's "undemocratic" approach.

== Controversies ==
Velappan caused a minor controversy during the 2004 AFC Asian Cup when he accused Chinese fans in the Workers Stadium in Beijing of jeering at VIP guests during the opening ceremony. He chided them as "not polite" and expressed doubts over Beijing's ability to host the Olympics in 2008. When it later emerged that a technical glitch involving the stadium's big screen had mistakenly created the impression that fans were booing at the guests, he apologised.
