= Jalil Che Din =

Malaysian footballer and coach

Personal information
- Full name: Jalil Che Din
- Date of birth: 27 July 1934
- Place of birth: Malaysia
- Date of death: 15 November 1992 (aged 58)
- Place of death: Batu Pahat, Malaysia
- Position: Centre-half

Senior career*
Years	Team	Apps	(Gls)
1950s	Penang		
1950s	Perak		

International career
1950s	Malaysia		

Managerial career
- 1970–1971: Malaysia (assistant)
- 1972: Malaysia
- 1974: Malaysia
- 1981: Malaysia
Medal record
Gold medal – first place	1958 Merdeka Tournament
Gold medal – first place	1959 Merdeka Tournament
Gold medal – first place	1974 Merdeka Tournament (as coach)
Bronze medal – third place	1974 Asian Games (as coach)
- * Club domestic league appearances and goals

Jalil Che Din (27 July 1934 – 15 November 1992) was a Malaysian football player and coach.

As a centre-half, he represented the Penang, Perak and Malaysian national football team in the 1950s. With the national team, Jalil winning the first 2 Merdeka Tournaments in 1958 and 1959. After injury cut short his playing career, he turned into coaching. He was assistant coach of Malaysia under Dave McLaren from 1970 to 1971, and they guided Malaysia to success in the qualification to the 1972 Munich Olympics football competition. In the final tournament, Jalil takes over from McLaren and oversaw 1 win (3-0 against United States) and 2 defeats (0-3 against West Germany, 0–6 against Morocco) from 3 group games. Nevertheless, this remains one of the greatest achievements of Malaysia football as it is the only appearances of the national team in the Olympics.

Later, Jalil returned to coach Malaysia in 2 other stints: which he helped the team won in 1974 Merdeka Tournament and won bronze medal in the 1974 Asian Games. The last stints, he make a comeback to trained national team in 1981 after the failure of Malaysia in the 1982 FIFA World Cup qualification under Karl Heinz Weigang.

By profession, Jalil was a prison officer under Malaysian Prisons Department, and for most of his life was working in Taiping Prison, and was Prison Director at Simpang Renggam Prison. Jalil died on 15 November 1992 aged 58, caused by heart attack while playing golf in Batu Pahat.
