= Emmanuel Sarpong =

Ghanaian footballer

Personal information
- Date of birth: 5 November 1971 (age 54)
- Place of birth: Ghana
- Positions: Forward; defender

Senior career*
Years	Team	Apps	(Gls)
19xx–1996	K.V.C. Westerlo		
1996–1997	K.S.K. Tongeren		
1997–19xx	R.A.A. Louviéroise		
2000–20xx	FC Eendracht Hekelgem		
20xx–2001	UR Namur		
2002	Heybridge Swifts F.C.		
2003	Sarawak FA		
- * Club domestic league appearances and goals

Emmanuel Sarpong (born 5 November 1971) is a Ghanaian retired professional footballer who is last known to have featured for Sarawak FA of the Malaysia Super League in 2003.

== England ==
Was a trialist for Dagenham & Redbridge in 2002.

== Malaysia ==
Cleared to represent Sarawak FA in competitions in 2003, Sarpong debuted in a league encounter with Pahang FA but had a proclivity for fouling, picking up five yellow cards his first five appearances with coach Jalil Ramli telling him to "take it easy". He then suffered a thigh injury and had to pass a fitness test before returning in time for the encounter with Perlis FA. However, the Ghanaian made a few costly errors in the first leg of the Malaysia Cup quarter-final which allowed Perak FA to win 2–0, causing him to be benched in the second leg before leaving by November.
