= Rafiz Abu Bakar =

Malaysian footballer

Personal information
- Full name: Rafiz bin Abu Bakar
- Date of birth: 26 June 1980 (age 46)
- Place of birth: Alor Star, Kedah, Malaysia
- Height: 1.71 m (5 ft 7 1/2 in)
- Position: Midfielder

Team information
- Current team: Kedah United
- Number: 14

Youth career
- 1997: FC Bayern Munich
- 1998–2000: Kedah FA President Cup

Senior career*
Years	Team	Apps	(Gls)
2001–2003	Kedah FA	?	(?)
2004–2006	Perlis FA	?	(?)
2006–2009	Kedah FA	?	(?)
2010	Sarawak FA		
2013–present	Kedah United		
- * Club domestic league appearances and goals

Rafiz Abu Bakar (born 26 June 1980 in Alor Star, Kedah) is a Malaysian footballer who is currently unattached.

Previously, he played for Sarawak FA in the 2010 Malaysia Premier League.

He was one of the bright youngster produced by the Malaysian youth coaches at the academy at FAM and he received a six-month training with Bundesliga champions, FC Bayern Munich when he was 16. After returning from training stints in Munich, Germany he was drafted to the Kedah youth and President Cup team under the guidance of current Kedah senior head coach, Mohd Azraai Khor Abdullah.

In 2004, he was loaned to Perlis FA for two seasons before returning to his hometown where he had limited playing time due to injuries.
