= Jalil Ramli =

Malaysian footballer

Jalil Ramli or Abdul Jalil Ramli (born 23 January 1965 in Sarawak) is a former captain Sarawak FA player and coach.

Abdul Jalil is the long throw-in specialist in Malaysia football.

== Honours ==
=== As a Player ===
Sarawak FA

- Premier League: 1997
- Malaysia FA Cup: 1992

=== As a Manager ===
Sarawak FA

- Malaysia Cup runner-up: 1999
- Malaysia FA Cup runner-up: 2001
