= Progression of association football goalscoring Oceania record =

This is a progressive list of men's association footballers who have held or co-held the Oceania record for international goals since 1922.

== Criteria ==
The criteria used by national FAs in considering a match as a full international were not historically fixed. Particularly for the early decades, and until more recently for FAs outside UEFA and CONMEBOL, counts of goals were often considered unreliable. IFFHS and RSSSF have spent much effort trying to produce definitive lists of full international matches, and corresponding data on players' international caps and goals. Australia and New Zealand's FAs have their own official caps and goals database, however other OFC members' FA's do not have their own caps and goals database. Using the data by the FA, NZF RSSSF and NFT, the following records can be retrospectively produced. Note that, at the time, these records may not have been recognised.

Although Australia played in the OFC, they were moved to the AFC confederation in 2006. This affects Tim Cahill, who scored 8 Oceania goals and 42 Asian goals. Australia's player goals in the AFC have been removed for consistency and only count their players' goals from 1922 to 2005.

== Oceania record ==
Player	Country	Goal	Date	Venue	Opponent	Score	Notes
Ted Cook	New Zealand	2	17-06-1922	Dunedin	Australia	3–1	Cook scored twice in this match.
Ted Cook	New Zealand	3	24-06-1922	Wellington	Australia	1–1	
Ted Cook	New Zealand	4	08-07-1922	Auckland	Australia	3–1	
George Campbell	New Zealand	7	30-06-1923	Newcastle	Australia	4–1	Campbell scored four times in this match to overtake Cook.
George Smith	Australia	7	24-06-1933	Sydney	New Zealand	4–2	Smith scored twice in this match to equal Campbell.
George Smith	Australia	11	04-07-1936	Dunedin	New Zealand	7–1	Smith scored four times in this match.
George Smith	Australia	16	11-07-1936	Wellington	New Zealand	10–0	Smith scored five times in this match.
Jock Newall	New Zealand	17	28-09-1952	Papeete	Tahiti	5–3	Newall scored four times in this match to overtake Smith.
Attila Abonyi	Australia	17	18-08-1973	Sydney	Iran	3–0	
Ray Baartz	Australia	17	11-11-1973	Seoul	South Korea	2–2	Jointly with Abonyi.
Ray Baartz	Australia	18	27-04-1974	Sydney	Uruguay	2–0	
Attila Abonyi	Australia	18	02-03-1976	Melbourne	New Zealand	3–1	Jointly with Baartz.
Attila Abonyi	Australia	19	18-08-1976	Gosford	Hong Kong	2–0	
Attila Abonyi	Australia	20	20-10-1976	Jakarta	Indonesia	1–1	
Attila Abonyi	Australia	21	24-10-1976	Hong Kong	Hong Kong	2–0	
Attila Abonyi	Australia	22	13-03-1977	Ba	Chinese Taipei	3–0	
Attila Abonyi	Australia	23	16-03-1977	Ba	Chinese Taipei	2–1	
Attila Abonyi	Australia	24	30-10-1977	Hong Kong	Hong Kong	5–2	
Attila Abonyi	Australia	25	13-11-1977	Singapore	Singapore	2–0	
Damian Mori	Australia	26	09-04-2001	Coffs Harbour	Tonga	22–0	Mori scored four times in this match to overtake Abonyi.
Damian Mori	Australia	27	06-07-2002	Auckland	Vanuatu	2–0	
Damian Mori	Australia	28	08-07-2002	Auckland	New Caledonia	11–0	
Damian Mori	Australia	29	12-07-2002	Auckland	Tahiti	2–1	
Esala Masi	Fiji	29	17-05-2004	Apia	Samoa	4–0	Jointly with Mori.
Esala Masi	Fiji	30	12-08-2005	Lautoka	India	1–0	
Esala Masi	Fiji	31	14-08-2005	Suva	India	2–1	
Commins Menapi	Solomon Islands	31	13-07-2007	Apia	American Samoa	12–1	Menapi scored four times in this match to equal Masi.
Commins Menapi	Solomon Islands	33	27-08-2007	Apia	Tonga	4–0	Menapi scored twice in this match.
Commins Menapi	Solomon Islands	34	05-09-2007	Apia	New Caledonia	2–3	
Chris Wood	New Zealand	34	13-10-2023	Murcia	DR Congo	1–1	Friendly match. Wood scored to equal Menapi.
Roy Krishna	Fiji	35	18-11-2023	Honiara	Northern Mariana Islands	10–0	2023 Pacific Games Krishna scored three times to overtake Wood.
Roy Krishna	Fiji	36	21-03-2024	Honiara	Solomon Islands	0–2	Friendly match
Roy Krishna	Fiji	37	16-06-2024	Suva	Papua New Guinea	1–5	2024 OFC Nations Cup
Roy Krishna	Fiji	39	19-06-2024	Suva	Samoa	1–9	2024 OFC Nations Cup Krishna scored twice in this match.
Roy Krishna	Fiji	40	22-06-2024	Suva	Tahiti	1–0	2024 OFC Nations Cup
Roy Krishna	Fiji	41	30-06-2024	Port Vila	Tahiti	2–1	2024 OFC Nations Cup
Roy Krishna	Fiji	42	10-10-2024	Suva	Solomon Islands	0–1	2026 FIFA World Cup qualification
Roy Krishna	Fiji	43	14-11-2024	Port Moresby	Papua New Guinea	3–3	2026 FIFA World Cup qualification
Roy Krishna	Fiji	44	17-11-2024	Port Moresby	New Caledonia	1–1	2026 FIFA World Cup qualification
Chris Wood	New Zealand	44	21-03-2025	Wellington	Fiji	7–0	2026 FIFA World Cup qualification Wood scored three times to equal Krishna.
Chris Wood	New Zealand	45	09-09-2025	Auckland	Australia	1–3	2025 Soccer Ashes
Roy Krishna	Fiji	45	09-06-2026	Port Vila	Vanuatu	2–2	Friendly match. Krishna scored one goal to equal Wood.
Roy Krishna	Fiji	46	18-09-2026	Suva	Solomon Islands	3–3	2026 MSG Prime Minister's Cup
Roy Krishna	Fiji	47	27-09-2026	Suva	Papua New Guinea	2–0	2026 MSG Prime Minister's Cup
Chris Wood	New Zealand	47	15-11-2026	Christchurch	India	3–0	Friendly match. Wood scored one goal to equal Krishna.

== See also ==
- Progression of association football goalscoring record
- Progression of association football caps Oceania record
- List of men's footballers with 50 or more international goals
