= Progression of association football caps European record =

This is a progressive list of men's association footballers who have held or co-held the European record for international caps since 1976. The progression up to 1976 is derivable from the world record progression because the world record holder was always European, except when Ángel Romano narrowly overtook Imre Schlosser in 1924–27. After 1976, many sources, including FIFA and the Guinness Book of Records reported subsequent European cap records as world records. Retrospective validation of various Asian players' caps has subsequently shown that they exceeded the contemporary European record; most sweepingly, in 2021 FIFA recognised that Soh Chin Ann won his 109th Malaysia cap in 1976 and his 195th and final cap in 1984, which in February 2022 was the world record.

The only pre-1976 European records not listed in the world record progression are Schlosser's record-breaking 67th cap and Severino Minelli's record-equalling 68th cap.

== European record ==
Player	Country	Cap	Date	Venue	Opponent	Score	Notes
:	:	:	:	:	:	:	
Imre Schlosser	Hungary	67	1926-11-14	Budapest	Sweden	3–1	
:	:	:	:	:	:	:	
Severino Minelli	Switzerland	68	1939-05-14	Liège	Belgium	2–1	
:	:	:	:	:	:	:	
Bobby Moore	England	108	1973-11-14	London	Italy	0–1	
Björn Nordqvist	Sweden	108	1978-05-21	Stockholm	Czechoslovakia	0–0	
Björn Nordqvist	Sweden	109	1978-06-03	Mar del Plata	Brazil	1–1	1978 FIFA World Cup
Björn Nordqvist	Sweden	110	1978-06-07	Buenos Aires	Austria	0–1	1978 FIFA World Cup
Björn Nordqvist	Sweden	111	1978-06-11	Buenos Aires	Spain	0–1	1978 FIFA World Cup
Björn Nordqvist	Sweden	112	1978-06-28	Borås	Finland	2–1	1978–80 Nordic Championship
Björn Nordqvist	Sweden	113	1978-08-16	Copenhagen	Denmark	1–2	1978–80 Nordic Championship
Björn Nordqvist	Sweden	114	1978-09-01	Paris	France	2–2	UEFA Euro 1980 qualifying
Björn Nordqvist	Sweden	115	1978-10-04	Stockholm	Czechoslovakia	1–3	UEFA Euro 1980 qualifying
Pat Jennings	Northern Ireland	115	1986-03-16	Belfast	Denmark	1–1	
Pat Jennings	Northern Ireland	116	1986-04-23	Belfast	Morocco	2–1	
Pat Jennings	Northern Ireland	117	1986-06-03	Guadalajara	Algeria	1–1	1986 FIFA World Cup
Pat Jennings	Northern Ireland	118	1986-06-07	Guadalajara	Spain	1–2	1986 FIFA World Cup
Pat Jennings	Northern Ireland	119	1986-06-12	Guadalajara	Brazil	0–3	1986 FIFA World Cup
Peter Shilton	England	119	1990-06-11	Cagliari	Republic of Ireland	1–1	1990 FIFA World Cup
Peter Shilton	England	120	1990-06-16	Cagliari	Netherlands	0–0	1990 FIFA World Cup
Peter Shilton	England	121	1990-06-21	Cagliari	Egypt	1–0	1990 FIFA World Cup
Peter Shilton	England	122	1990-06-26	Bologna	Belgium	1–0	1990 FIFA World Cup
Peter Shilton	England	123	1990-07-01	Naples	Cameroon	3–2	1990 FIFA World Cup
Peter Shilton	England	124	1990-07-04	Turin	West Germany	1–1 (Note: England lost 3–4 on penalties)	1990 FIFA World Cup
Peter Shilton	England	125	1990-07-07	Bari	Italy	1–2	1990 FIFA World Cup
Thomas Ravelli	Sweden	125	1995-06-01	Stockholm	Iceland	1–1	UEFA Euro 1996 qualifying
Thomas Ravelli	Sweden	126	1995-06-08	Leeds	England	3–3	Umbro Cup
Thomas Ravelli	Sweden	127	1995-06-10	Nottingham	Japan	2–2	Umbro Cup
Thomas Ravelli	Sweden	128	1995-11-15	Stockholm	Turkey	2–2	UEFA Euro 1996 qualifying
Thomas Ravelli	Sweden	129	1996-02-22	Hong Kong	Japan	1–1 (Note: Sweden won 5–4 on penalties)	Carlsberg Cup
Thomas Ravelli	Sweden	130	1996-02-28	Sydney	Australia	0–0	
Thomas Ravelli	Sweden	131	1996-08-14	Gothenburg	Denmark	0–1	
Thomas Ravelli	Sweden	132	1996-10-09	Stockholm	Austria	0–1	1998 FIFA World Cup qualification
Thomas Ravelli	Sweden	133	1996-11-10	Glasgow	Scotland	0–1	1998 FIFA World Cup qualification
Thomas Ravelli	Sweden	134	1997-02-11	Bangkok	Thailand	0–0	King's Cup (Note: Though the team was billed as "Swedish League XI", the matches are counted as full internationals)
Thomas Ravelli	Sweden	135	1997-02-16	Bangkok	Thailand	3–1	King's Cup
Thomas Ravelli	Sweden	136	1997-03-12	Tel Aviv	Israel	1–0	
Thomas Ravelli	Sweden	137	1997-04-02	Paris	France	0–1	
Thomas Ravelli	Sweden	138	1997-04-30	Gothenburg	Scotland	2–1	1998 FIFA World Cup qualification
Thomas Ravelli	Sweden	139	1997-08-06	Malmö	Lithuania	1–0	1998 FIFA World Cup qualification
Thomas Ravelli	Sweden	140	1997-08-20	Minsk	Belarus	2–1	1998 FIFA World Cup qualification
Thomas Ravelli	Sweden	141	1997-09-06	Vienna	Austria	0–1	1998 FIFA World Cup qualification
Thomas Ravelli	Sweden	142	1997-09-10	Stockholm	Latvia	1–0	1998 FIFA World Cup qualification
Thomas Ravelli	Sweden	143	1997-10-11	Stockholm	Estonia	1–0	1998 FIFA World Cup qualification
Lothar Matthäus	Germany	143	1999-11-14	Oslo	Norway	1–0	
Lothar Matthäus	Germany	144	2000-02-23	Amsterdam	Netherlands	1–2	
Lothar Matthäus	Germany	145	2000-03-29	Zagreb	Croatia	1–1	
Lothar Matthäus	Germany	146	2000-04-26	Kaiserslautern	Switzerland	1–1	
Lothar Matthäus	Germany	147	2000-06-07	Freiburg im Breisgau	Liechtenstein	8–2	
Lothar Matthäus	Germany	148	2000-06-12	Liège	Romania	1–1	UEFA Euro 2000
Lothar Matthäus	Germany	149	2000-06-17	Charleroi	England	0–1	UEFA Euro 2000
Lothar Matthäus	Germany	150	2000-06-20	Rotterdam	Portugal	0–3	UEFA Euro 2000
Martin Reim	Estonia	149 (150) (Note: UEFA's total recognised caps for Reim is one less than the Estonian FA's, which recognises a 2004 match against Belarus U-21.)	2007-02-07	Domžale	Slovenia	0–1	
Martin Reim	Estonia	150	2007-08-22	Tallinn	Andorra	2–1	UEFA Euro 2008 qualifying
Martin Reim	Estonia	151	2007-09-08	Zagreb	Croatia	0–2	UEFA Euro 2008 qualifying
Martin Reim	Estonia	152	2007-09-12	Skopje	Macedonia	1–1	UEFA Euro 2008 qualifying
Martin Reim	Estonia	153	2007-10-17	Tallinn	Montenegro	0–1	
Martin Reim	Estonia	154	2007-11-09	Jeddah	Saudi Arabia	0–2	
Martin Reim	Estonia	155	2007-11-17	Andorra la Vella	Andorra	2–0	UEFA Euro 2008 qualifying
Martin Reim	Estonia	156	2009-06-06	Tallinn	Equatorial Guinea	3–0	
Vitalijs Astafjevs	Latvia	155 (156) (Note: UEFA's total recognised caps for Astafjevs is one less than the Latvian FA's and one more than FIFA's. The Latvian FA recognises a 2005 King's Cup match against Oman under-23, while FIFA does not recognise the 2010 match against Angola owing to excessive substitutions.)	2009-09-05	Tel Aviv	Israel	1–0	2010 FIFA World Cup qualification
Vitalijs Astafjevs	Latvia	156	2009-10-14	Riga	Moldova	3–2	2010 FIFA World Cup qualification
Vitalijs Astafjevs	Latvia	157	2009-11-14	Tegucigalpa	Honduras	1–2	
Vitalijs Astafjevs	Latvia	158	2010-03-03	Luanda	Angola	1–1	
Vitalijs Astafjevs	Latvia	159	2010-06-05	Milton Keynes	Ghana	0–1	
Vitalijs Astafjevs	Latvia	160	2010-06-18	Kaunas	Lithuania	0–0	2010 Baltic Cup
Vitalijs Astafjevs	Latvia	161	2010-06-19	Kaunas	Estonia	0–0	2010 Baltic Cup
Vitalijs Astafjevs	Latvia	162	2010-09-03	Riga	Croatia	0–3	UEFA Euro 2012 qualifying
Vitalijs Astafjevs	Latvia	163	2010-09-07	Valletta	Malta	2–0	UEFA Euro 2012 qualifying
Vitalijs Astafjevs	Latvia	164	2010-10-08	Athens	Greece	0–1	UEFA Euro 2012 qualifying
Vitalijs Astafjevs	Latvia	165	2010-10-10	Riga	Georgia	1–1	UEFA Euro 2012 qualifying
Vitalijs Astafjevs	Latvia	166	2010-11-17	Kunming	China	0–1	
Iker Casillas	Spain	166	2016-03-27	Cluj	Romania	0–0	
Iker Casillas	Spain	167	2016-06-01	Salzburg	South Korea	6–1	
Gianluigi Buffon	Italy	167	2016-11-15	Milan	Germany	0–0	
Gianluigi Buffon	Italy	168	2017-03-24	Palermo	Albania	2–0	2018 FIFA World Cup qualification
Gianluigi Buffon	Italy	169	2017-06-11	Udine	Liechtenstein	5–0	2018 FIFA World Cup qualification
Gianluigi Buffon	Italy	170	2017-09-02	Madrid	Spain	0–3	2018 FIFA World Cup qualification
Gianluigi Buffon	Italy	171	2017-09-05	Reggio Emilia	Israel	1–0	2018 FIFA World Cup qualification
Gianluigi Buffon	Italy	172	2017-10-06	Turin	North Macedonia	1–1	2018 FIFA World Cup qualification
Gianluigi Buffon	Italy	173	2017-10-06	Shkodër	Albania	1–0	2018 FIFA World Cup qualification
Gianluigi Buffon	Italy	174	2017-11-10	Stockholm	Sweden	0–1	2018 FIFA World Cup qualification
Gianluigi Buffon	Italy	175	2017-11-13	Milan	Sweden	0–0	2018 FIFA World Cup qualification
Gianluigi Buffon	Italy	176	2018-03-23	Manchester	Argentina	0–2	
Sergio Ramos	Spain	176	2020-11-11	Amsterdam	Netherlands	1–1	
Sergio Ramos	Spain	177	2020-11-14	Basel	Switzerland	1–1	2020–21 UEFA Nations League
Sergio Ramos	Spain	178	2020-11-17	Seville	Germany	6–0	2020–21 UEFA Nations League
Sergio Ramos	Spain	179	2021-03-25	Granada	Greece	1–1	2022 FIFA World Cup qualification
Sergio Ramos	Spain	180	2021-03-31	Seville	Kosovo	3–1	2022 FIFA World Cup qualification
Cristiano Ronaldo	Portugal	180	2021-09-01	Faro/Loulé	Republic of Ireland	2–1	2022 FIFA World Cup qualification
Cristiano Ronaldo	Portugal	181	2021-10-09	Faro/Loulé	Qatar	3–0	
Cristiano Ronaldo	Portugal	182	2021-10-12	Faro/Loulé	Luxembourg	5–0	2022 FIFA World Cup qualification
Cristiano Ronaldo	Portugal	183	2021-11-11	Dublin	Republic of Ireland	0–0	2022 FIFA World Cup qualification
Cristiano Ronaldo	Portugal	184	2021-11-14	Lisbon	Serbia	1–2	2022 FIFA World Cup qualification
Cristiano Ronaldo	Portugal	185	2022-03-24	Porto	Turkey	3–1	2022 FIFA World Cup qualification
Cristiano Ronaldo	Portugal	186	2022-03-29	Porto	North Macedonia	2–0	2022 FIFA World Cup qualification
Cristiano Ronaldo	Portugal	187	2022-06-02	Seville	Spain	1–1	2022–23 UEFA Nations League
Cristiano Ronaldo	Portugal	188	2022-06-05	Lisbon	Switzerland	4–0	2022–23 UEFA Nations League
Cristiano Ronaldo	Portugal	189	2022-06-09	Lisbon	Czech Republic	2–0	2022–23 UEFA Nations League
Cristiano Ronaldo	Portugal	190	2022-09-24	Prague	Czech Republic	0–4	2022–23 UEFA Nations League
Cristiano Ronaldo	Portugal	191	2022-09-27	Braga	Spain	0–1	2022–23 UEFA Nations League
Cristiano Ronaldo	Portugal	192	2022-11-24	Doha	Ghana	3–2	2022 FIFA World Cup
Cristiano Ronaldo	Portugal	193	2022-11-28	Lusail	Uruguay	2–0	2022 FIFA World Cup
Cristiano Ronaldo	Portugal	194	2022-12-02	Al Rayyan	South Korea	2–1	2022 FIFA World Cup
Cristiano Ronaldo	Portugal	195	2022-12-06	Lusail	Switzerland	6–1	2022 FIFA World Cup
Cristiano Ronaldo	Portugal	196	2022-12-10	Doha	Morocco	1–0	2022 FIFA World Cup
Cristiano Ronaldo	Portugal	197	2023-03-23	Lisbon	Liechtenstein	4–0	UEFA Euro 2024 qualifying
Cristiano Ronaldo	Portugal	198	2023-03-26	Luxembourg	Luxembourg	6–0	UEFA Euro 2024 qualifying
Cristiano Ronaldo	Portugal	199	2023-06-17	Lisbon	Bosnia and Herzegovina	3–0	UEFA Euro 2024 qualifying
Cristiano Ronaldo	Portugal	200	2023-06-20	Reykjavík	Iceland	0–1	UEFA Euro 2024 qualifying
Cristiano Ronaldo	Portugal	201	2023-09-08	Trnava	Slovakia	0–1	UEFA Euro 2024 qualifying
Cristiano Ronaldo	Portugal	202	2023-10-13	Porto	Slovakia	3–2	UEFA Euro 2024 qualifying
Cristiano Ronaldo	Portugal	203	2023-10-16	Zenica	Bosnia and Herzegovina	0–5	UEFA Euro 2024 qualifying
Cristiano Ronaldo	Portugal	204	2023-11-16	Vaduz	Liechtenstein	0–2	UEFA Euro 2024 qualifying
Cristiano Ronaldo	Portugal	205	2023-11-19	Lisbon	Iceland	2–0	UEFA Euro 2024 qualifying
Cristiano Ronaldo	Portugal	206	2024-03-26	Ljubljana	Slovenia	2–0	
Cristiano Ronaldo	Portugal	207	2024-06-11	Aveiro	Republic of Ireland	3–0	
Cristiano Ronaldo	Portugal	208	2024-06-18	Leipzig	Czech Republic	2–1	UEFA Euro 2024
Cristiano Ronaldo	Portugal	209	2024-06-22	Dortmund	Turkey	3–0	UEFA Euro 2024
Cristiano Ronaldo	Portugal	210	2024-06-26	Gelsenkirchen	Georgia	2–0	UEFA Euro 2024
Cristiano Ronaldo	Portugal	211	2024-07-01	Frankfurt	Slovenia	0–0	UEFA Euro 2024
Cristiano Ronaldo	Portugal	212	2024-07-05	Hamburg	France	0–0	UEFA Euro 2024
Cristiano Ronaldo	Portugal	213	2024-09-05	Lisbon	Croatia	2–1	2024–25 UEFA Nations League
Cristiano Ronaldo	Portugal	214	2024-09-08	Lisbon	Scotland	2–1	2024–25 UEFA Nations League
Cristiano Ronaldo	Portugal	215	2024-10-12	Warsaw	Poland	1–3	2024–25 UEFA Nations League
Cristiano Ronaldo	Portugal	216	2024-10-15	Glasgow	Scotland	0–0	2024–25 UEFA Nations League
Cristiano Ronaldo	Portugal	217	2024-11-15	Porto	Poland	5–1	2024–25 UEFA Nations League
Cristiano Ronaldo	Portugal	218	2025-03-20	Copenhagen	Denmark	1–0	2024–25 UEFA Nations League
Cristiano Ronaldo	Portugal	219	2025-03-23	Lisbon	Denmark	5–2	2024–25 UEFA Nations League
Cristiano Ronaldo	Portugal	220	2025-06-04	Munich	Germany	1–2	2025 UEFA Nations League Finals
Cristiano Ronaldo	Portugal	221	2025-06-08	Munich	Spain	2–2	2025 UEFA Nations League Finals
Cristiano Ronaldo	Portugal	222	2025-09-06	Yerevan	Armenia	0–5	2026 FIFA World Cup qualification
Cristiano Ronaldo	Portugal	223	2025-09-09	Budapest	Hungary	2–3	2026 FIFA World Cup qualification
Cristiano Ronaldo	Portugal	224	11 October 2025	Lisbon	Republic of Ireland	1–0	2026 FIFA World Cup qualification
Cristiano Ronaldo	Portugal	225	14 October 2025	Lisbon	Hungary	2–2	2026 FIFA World Cup qualification
Cristiano Ronaldo	Portugal	226	13 November 2025	Dublin	Republic of Ireland	2–0	2026 FIFA World Cup qualification
Cristiano Ronaldo	Portugal	227	6 June 2026	Oeiras	Chile	2–1	
Cristiano Ronaldo	Portugal	228	10 June 2026	Leiria	Nigeria	2–1	
Cristiano Ronaldo	Portugal	229	17 June 2026	Houston	DR Congo	1–1	2026 FIFA World Cup
Cristiano Ronaldo	Portugal	230	23 June 2026	Houston	Uzbekistan	5–0	2026 FIFA World Cup
Cristiano Ronaldo	Portugal	231	27 June 2026	Miami Gardens	Colombia	0–0	2026 FIFA World Cup
Cristiano Ronaldo	Portugal	232	2 July 2026	Toronto	Croatia	2–1	2026 FIFA World Cup
Cristiano Ronaldo	Portugal	233	6 July 2026	Dallas	Spain	0–1	2026 FIFA World Cup
Cristiano Ronaldo	Portugal	234	24 September 2026	Lisbon	Wales	1–0	2026–27 UEFA Nations League

== See also ==
- Progression of association football caps record (world record)
- List of football (soccer) players with 100 or more caps
