= Progression of association football goalscoring European record =

This is a progressive list of men's association footballers who have held or co-held the European record for international goals since 1873. The progression up to 1956 is derivable from the world record progression because the world record holder was always European.

Cristiano Ronaldo became the first European and the second world international player to score 100 international goals. He scored his 100th goal for Portugal on 8 September 2020 against Sweden.

== Criteria ==
The criteria used by national FAs in considering a match as a full international were not historically fixed. Particularly for the early decades, and until more recently for FAs outside UEFA and CONMEBOL, counts of goals were often considered unreliable. RSSSF and IFFHS have spent much effort trying to produce definitive lists of full international matches, and corresponding data on players' international caps and goals. Using this data, the following records can be retrospectively produced. Note that, at the time, these records may not have been recognised.

One point of note is that early matches by the England Amateur side were played against the full national side of opponents. These matches are counted as full internationals by the IFFHS and the opposing FAs, though not by the (English) FA. This affects Vivian Woodward, who scored 29 full goals and 44 amateur goals; the IFFHS and RSSSF considers him as the record-holder from 1908.

== European record ==
Player	Country	Goal	Date	Venue	Opponent	Score	Notes
William Kenyon-Slaney	England	2	1873-03-08	Kennington Oval	Scotland	4–2	
Henry McNeil	Scotland	2	1876-03-04	Hamilton Crescent	England	3–0	
Henry McNeil	Scotland	3	1876-03-25	Hamilton Crescent	Wales	4–0	
John Ferguson	Scotland	3	1877-03-03	Kennington Oval	England	3–1	
Henry McNeil	Scotland	5	1878-03-02	Hampden Park	England	7–2	
John Ferguson	Scotland	5	1878-03-23	Hampden Park	Wales	9–0	
Billy MacKinnon	Scotland	5	1879-04-05	The Oval	England	4–5	
John Smith	Scotland	6	1881-03-12	The Oval	England	6–1	
George Ker	Scotland	7	1881-03-14	Racecourse Ground	Wales	5–1	
George Ker	Scotland	9	1882-03-11	Hampden Park	England	5–1	
George Ker	Scotland	10	1882-03-25	Hampden Park	Wales	5–0	
John Smith	Scotland	10	1884-03-15	1st Cathkin Park	England	1–0	
Charles Bambridge	England	10	1885-02-28		Ireland	4–0	
Charles Bambridge	England	11	1885-03-21		Scotland	1–1	
Tinsley Lindley	England	11	1888-04-07		Ireland	5–1	
Fred Dewhurst	England	11	1888-02-23		Wales	4–1	
Tinsley Lindley	England	12	1890-02-23		Wales	3–1	
Tinsley Lindley	England	14	1891-03-07		Ireland	6–1	
Steve Bloomer	England	15	1899-04-02		Scotland	3–1	
Steve Bloomer	England	17	1899-02-19		Ireland	13–2	
Steve Bloomer	England	19	1899-03-20		Wales	4–0	
Steve Bloomer	England	20	1900-04-07		Scotland	1–4	
Steve Bloomer	England	24	1901-03-18		Wales	6–0	
Steve Bloomer	England	25	1901-03-30		Scotland	2–2	
Steve Bloomer	England	26	1904-04-09		Scotland	1–0	
Steve Bloomer	England	27	1905-02-25		Ireland	1–1	
Steve Bloomer	England	28	1907-04-06		Scotland	1–1	
Vivian Woodward	England	31	1908-06-08		Austria	11–1	Woodward scored four times in this match to overtake Bloomer.
Vivian Woodward	England	32	1908-06-10		Hungary	7–0	
Vivian Woodward	England Amateurs	34	1908-10-20		Sweden	12–1	
Vivian Woodward	England Amateurs	35	1908-10-24		Denmark	2–0	
Vivian Woodward	England	37	1909-02-13		Ireland	4–0	Woodward scored twice in this match.
Vivian Woodward	England Amateurs	39	1909-04-17		Belgium	11–2	Woodward scored twice in this match.
Vivian Woodward	England Amateurs	43	1909-05-20		Switzerland	9–0	Woodward scored four times in this match.
Vivian Woodward	England Amateurs	44	1909-05-22		France	11–0	
Vivian Woodward	England	46	1909-05-29		Hungary	4–2	Woodward scored twice in this match.
Vivian Woodward	England	50	1909-05-31		Hungary	8–2	Woodward scored four times in this match.
Vivian Woodward	England	53	1909-06-01		Austria	8–1	Woodward scored three times in this match.
Vivian Woodward	England Amateurs	54	1909-11-06		Sweden	7–0	
Vivian Woodward	England Amateurs	60	1909-12-11		Netherlands	9–1	Woodward scored six times in this match.
Vivian Woodward	England Amateurs	61	1911-03-04		Belgium	4–0	
Vivian Woodward	England	63	1911-03-13		Wales	3–0	Woodward scored twice in this match.
Vivian Woodward	England Amateurs	64	1911-05-25		Switzerland	4–1	
Vivian Woodward	England Amateurs	65	1912-03-16		Netherlands	4–0	
Vivian Woodward	England Amateurs	66	1912-06-30		Hungary	7–0	
Vivian Woodward	England Amateurs	68	1912-11-09		Belgium	4–0	Woodward scored twice in this match.
Vivian Woodward	England Amateurs	69	1913-03-21		Germany	3–0	
Vivian Woodward	England Amateurs	70	1913-03-24		Netherlands	1–2	
Vivian Woodward	England Amateurs	71	1913-11-15		Netherlands	2–1	
Vivian Woodward	England Amateurs	72	1914-02-24		Belgium	8–1	
Vivian Woodward	England Amateurs	73	1914-06-10		Sweden	5–1	
Ferenc Puskás	Hungary	73	1955-05-19		Finland	9–1	
Ferenc Puskás	Hungary	75	1955-09-17		Switzerland	5–4	Puskás scored twice in this match.
Ferenc Puskás	Hungary	76	1955-09-25		Czechoslovakia	3–1	
Ferenc Puskás	Hungary	77	1955-10-16		Austria	6–1	
Ferenc Puskás	Hungary	78	1955-11-13		Sweden	4–2	
Ferenc Puskás	Hungary	79	1955-11-27		Italy	2–0	
Ferenc Puskás	Hungary	80	1956-02-19		Turkey	1–3	
Ferenc Puskás	Hungary	81	1956-02-29		Lebanon	4–1	
Ferenc Puskás	Hungary	82	1956-06-03		Belgium	4–5	
Ferenc Puskás	Hungary	83	1956-09-16		Yugoslavia	3–1	
Ferenc Puskás	Hungary	84	1956-10-14		Austria	2–0	
Cristiano Ronaldo	Portugal	84	2018-06-15	Fisht Olympic Stadium	Spain	3–3	Ronaldo scored three times in this match to equal Puskás.
Cristiano Ronaldo	Portugal	85	2018-06-20	Luzhniki Stadium	Morocco	1–0	
Cristiano Ronaldo	Portugal	88	2019-06-05	Estádio do Dragão	Switzerland	3–1	Ronaldo scored three times in this match.
Cristiano Ronaldo	Portugal	89	2019-09-07	Red Star Stadium	Serbia	4–2	
Cristiano Ronaldo	Portugal	93	2019-09-10	LFF Stadium	Lithuania	5–1	Ronaldo scored four times in this match.
Cristiano Ronaldo	Portugal	94	2019-10-11	Estádio José Alvalade	Luxembourg	3–0	
Cristiano Ronaldo	Portugal	95	2019-10-14	Olimpiyskiy National Sports Complex	Ukraine	1–2	Ronaldo scored three times in this match.
Cristiano Ronaldo	Portugal	98	2019-11-14	Estádio Algarve	Lithuania	6–0	
Cristiano Ronaldo	Portugal	99	2019-11-17	Stade Josy Barthel	Luxembourg	2–0	
Cristiano Ronaldo	Portugal	101	2020-09-08	Friends Arena	Sweden	2–0	Ronaldo scored twice in this match.
Cristiano Ronaldo	Portugal	102	2020-11-11	Estádio da Luz	Andorra	7–0	
Cristiano Ronaldo	Portugal	103	2021-03-30	Stade Josy Barthel	Luxembourg	3–1	
Cristiano Ronaldo	Portugal	104	2021-06-09	Estádio José Alvalade	Israel	4–0	
Cristiano Ronaldo	Portugal	106	2021-06-15	Puskás Aréna	Hungary	3–0	Ronaldo scored twice in this match.
Cristiano Ronaldo	Portugal	107	2021-06-19	Allianz Arena	Germany	2–4	
Cristiano Ronaldo	Portugal	109	2021-06-23	Puskás Aréna	France	2–2	Ronaldo scored twice in this match.
Cristiano Ronaldo	Portugal	111	2021-09-01	Estádio Algarve	Republic of Ireland	2–1	Ronaldo scored twice in this match.
Cristiano Ronaldo	Portugal	112	2021-10-09	Estádio Algarve	Qatar	1–0	
Cristiano Ronaldo	Portugal	115	2021-10-12	Estádio Algarve	Luxembourg	5–0	Ronaldo scored three times in this match.
Cristiano Ronaldo	Portugal	117	2022-06-05	Estádio José Alvalade	Switzerland	4–0	Ronaldo scored twice in this match.
Cristiano Ronaldo	Portugal	118	2022-11-25	Stadium 974	Ghana	3–2	
Cristiano Ronaldo	Portugal	120	2023-03-23	Estádio José Alvalade	Liechtenstein	4–0	Ronaldo scored twice in this match.
Cristiano Ronaldo	Portugal	122	2023-03-26	Stade de Luxembourg	Luxembourg	6–0	Ronaldo scored twice in this match.
Cristiano Ronaldo	Portugal	123	2023-06-20	Laugardalsvöllur	Iceland	0–1	
Cristiano Ronaldo	Portugal	125	2023-10-13	Estádio do Dragão	Slovakia	3–2	Ronaldo scored twice in this match.
Cristiano Ronaldo	Portugal	127	2023-10-16	Bilino Polje	Bosnia and Herzegovina	0–5	Ronaldo scored twice in this match.
Cristiano Ronaldo	Portugal	128	2023-11-16	Rheinpark Stadion	Liechtenstein	0–2	
Cristiano Ronaldo	Portugal	130	2024-06-11	Estádio Municipal de Aveiro	Republic of Ireland	3–0	Ronaldo scored twice in this match.
Cristiano Ronaldo	Portugal	131	2024-09-05	Estádio da Luz	Croatia	2–1	
Cristiano Ronaldo	Portugal	132	2024-09-08	Estádio da Luz	Scotland	2–1	
Cristiano Ronaldo	Portugal	133	2024-10-12	Stadion Narodowy	Poland	1–3	
Cristiano Ronaldo	Portugal	135	2024-11-15	Estádio do Dragão	Poland	5–1	Ronaldo scored twice in this match.
Cristiano Ronaldo	Portugal	136	2025-03-23	Estádio José Alvalade	Denmark	5–2	
Cristiano Ronaldo	Portugal	137	2025-06-04	Allianz Arena	Germany	1–2	
Cristiano Ronaldo	Portugal	138	2025-06-08	Allianz Arena	Spain	2–2	
Cristiano Ronaldo	Portugal	140	2025-09-06	Vazgen Sargsyan Republican Stadium	Armenia	0–5	Ronaldo scored twice in this match.
Cristiano Ronaldo	Portugal	141	2025-09-09	Puskás Aréna	Hungary	2–3	
Cristiano Ronaldo	Portugal	143	2025-10-14	Estádio José Alvalade	Hungary	2–2	Ronaldo scored twice in this match.
Cristiano Ronaldo	Portugal	145	2026-05-23	NRG Stadium	Uzbekistan	5–0	Ronaldo scored twice in this match.
Cristiano Ronaldo	Portugal	146	2026-07-02	BMO Field	Croatia	2–1	

== See also ==
- Progression of association football goalscoring record (world record)
- List of men's footballers with 50 or more international goals
