= Progression of association football caps Oceania record =

This is a progressive list of men's association footballers who have held or co-held the Oceania record for international caps since 1922.

== Criteria ==
The criteria used by national FAs in considering a match as a full international were not historically fixed. Particularly for the early decades, and until more recently for FAs outside UEFA and CONMEBOL, counts of caps were often considered unreliable. RSSSF have spent much effort trying to produce definitive lists of full international matches, and corresponding data on players' international caps and goals. Australia and New Zealand's FAs have their own official caps and goals database, however other OFC members' FA's do not have their own caps and goals database. Using the data by the FA, NZF, RSSSF, NFT, the following records can be retrospectively produced. Note that, at the time, these records may not have been recognised.

Although Australia played in the OFC, they were moved to the AFC confederation in 2006. This affects Mark Schwarzer, who made 36 caps during OFC affiliation and 73 caps during AFC affiliation totalling a seemed record of 109 international caps. Australia's player caps in the AFC years have been removed for consistency and only count their players' caps from 1922 to 2005.

== Oceania record ==
Player	Country	Cap	Date	Venue	Opponent	Score	Notes
George Cartwright	Australia	7	23-06-1924	Sydney	Canada	4–1	
George Cartwright	Australia	8	28-06-1924	Newcastle	Canada	0–0	
George Cartwright	Australia	9	12-07-1924	Adelaide	Canada	1–4	
George Cartwright	Australia	10	26-07-1924	Sydney	Canada	1–0	
Jack Evans	Australia	10	24-09-1938	Sydney	India	5–4	
Jimmy McNabb	Australia	10	24-09-1938	Sydney	India	5–4	
Jack Evans	Australia	11	01-10-1938	Melbourne	India	3–1	
Cec Drummond	Australia	11	24-06-1950	Durban	South Africa	2–3	
Cec Drummond	Australia	12	01-07-1950	Johannesburg	South Africa	1–2	
Cec Drummond	Australia	13	08-07-1950	Port Elizabeth	South Africa	2–1	
Cec Drummond	Australia	14	23-07-1950	Cape Town	South Africa	2–0	
Stan Ackerley	Australia	14	30-03-1968	Sydney	Japan	2–2	
Stan Ackerley	Australia	15	31-03-1968	Melbourne	Japan	3–1	
Stan Ackerley	Australia	16	04-04-1968	Adelaide	Japan	1–3	
Stan Ackerley	Australia	17	20-07-1969	Sydney	Greece	1–0	
Stan Ackerley	Australia	18	23-07-1969	Brisbane	Greece	2–2	
Stan Ackerley	Australia	19	26-07-1969	Melbourne	Greece	0–2	
Stan Ackerley	Australia	20	10-10-1969	Seoul	Japan	3–1	1970 FIFA World Cup qualification
Stan Ackerley	Australia	21	14-10-1969	Seoul	South Korea	2–1	1970 FIFA World Cup qualification
Stan Ackerley	Australia	22	16-10-1969	Seoul	Japan	1–1	1970 FIFA World Cup qualification
Stan Ackerley	Australia	23	20-10-1969	Seoul	South Korea	1–1	1970 FIFA World Cup qualification
Stan Ackerley	Australia	24	23-11-1969	Laurenco Marques	Rhodesia	1–1	1970 FIFA World Cup qualification
Stan Ackerley	Australia	25	27-11-1969	Laurenco Marques	Rhodesia	0–0	1970 FIFA World Cup qualification
Stan Ackerley	Australia	26	04-12-1969	Tel Aviv	Israel	0–1	1970 FIFA World Cup qualification
Stan Ackerley	Australia	27	14-12-1969	Sydney	Israel	1–1	1970 FIFA World Cup qualification
Manfred Schaefer	Australia	27	07-10-1972	Jakarta	Indonesia	4–1	
Manfred Schaefer	Australia	28	09-10-1972	Jakarta	New Zealand	3–1	
Manfred Schaefer	Australia	29	15-10-1972	Saigon	South Vietnam	1–0	
Manfred Schaefer	Australia	30	22-10-1972	Seoul	South Korea	1–1	
Manfred Schaefer	Australia	31	24-10-1972	Seoul	South Korea	2–0	
Manfred Schaefer	Australia	32	29-10-1972	Manila	Philippines	6–0	
Manfred Schaefer	Australia	33	14-02-1973	Sydney	Bulgaria	2–2	
Manfred Schaefer	Australia	34	16-02-1973	Adelaide	Bulgaria	1–3	
Manfred Schaefer	Australia	35	18-02-1973	Melbourne	Bulgaria	0–2	
Manfred Schaefer	Australia	36	04-03-1973	Auckland	New Zealand	1–1	1974 FIFA World Cup qualification
Manfred Schaefer	Australia	37	04-03-1973	Sydney	Iraq	3–1	1974 FIFA World Cup qualification
Manfred Schaefer	Australia	38	13-03-1973	Sydney	Indonesia	2–1	1974 FIFA World Cup qualification
Manfred Schaefer	Australia	39	16-03-1973	Sydney	New Zealand	3–3	1974 FIFA World Cup qualification
Manfred Schaefer	Australia	40	18-03-1973	Melbourne	Iraq	0–0	1974 FIFA World Cup qualification
Manfred Schaefer	Australia	41	24-03-1973	Sydney	Indonesia	6–0	1974 FIFA World Cup qualification
Manfred Schaefer	Australia	42	11-11-1973	Seoul	South Korea	2–2	1974 FIFA World Cup qualification
Manfred Schaefer	Australia	43	13-11-1973	Hong Kong	South Korea	1–0	1974 FIFA World Cup qualification
Manfred Schaefer	Australia	44	25-04-1974	Melbourne	Uruguay	0–0	
Manfred Schaefer	Australia	45	21-05-1974	Jakarta	Indonesia	2–1	
Manfred Schaefer	Australia	46	28-05-1974	Jaffa	Israel	1–2	
Manfred Schaefer	Australia	47	14-06-1974	Hamburg	East Germany	0–2	1974 FIFA World Cup
Manfred Schaefer	Australia	48	18-06-1974	Hamburg	West Germany	0–3	1974 FIFA World Cup
Manfred Schaefer	Australia	49	22-06-1974	Berlin	Chile	0–0	1974 FIFA World Cup
Peter Wilson	Australia	49	29-10-1976	Canton	China	2–0	
Peter Wilson	Australia	50	03-11-1976	Tel Aviv	Israel	1–1	
Peter Wilson	Australia	51	12-02-1977	Melbourne	Israel	1–1	
Peter Wilson	Australia	52	16-02-1977	Sydney	Israel	1–1	
Peter Wilson	Australia	53	13-03-1977	Suva	Chinese Taipei	3–0	1978 FIFA World Cup qualification
Peter Wilson	Australia	54	16-03-1977	Suva	Chinese Taipei	2–1	1978 FIFA World Cup qualification
Peter Wilson	Australia	55	19-03-1977	Suva	Fiji	0–1	
Peter Wilson	Australia	56	27-03-1977	Sydney	New Zealand	3–1	1978 FIFA World Cup qualification
Peter Wilson	Australia	57	30-03-1977	Auckland	New Zealand	1–1	1978 FIFA World Cup qualification
Peter Wilson	Australia	58	10-07-1977	Auckland	Hong Kong	3–0	1978 FIFA World Cup qualification
Peter Wilson	Australia	59	14-08-1977	Melbourne	Iran	0–1	1978 FIFA World Cup qualification
Peter Wilson	Australia	60	28-08-1977	Sydney	South Korea	2–1	1978 FIFA World Cup qualification
Peter Wilson	Australia	61	16-10-1977	Sydney	Kuwait	1–2	1978 FIFA World Cup qualification
Peter Wilson	Australia	62	23-10-1977	Seoul	South Korea	0–0	1978 FIFA World Cup qualification
Peter Wilson	Australia	63	30-10-1977	Hong Kong	Hong Kong	5–2	1978 FIFA World Cup qualification
Peter Wilson	Australia	64	25-11-1977	Tehran	Iran	0–1	1978 FIFA World Cup qualification
Peter Wilson	Australia	65	13-06-1979	Auckland	New Zealand	0–1	
Alex Tobin	Australia	65	25-01-1997	Sydney	Norway	1–0	
Alex Tobin	Australia	66	11-06-1997	Sydney	Solomon Islands	13–0	1998 FIFA World Cup qualification
Alex Tobin	Australia	67	17-06-1997	Sydney	Solomon Islands	6–2	1998 FIFA World Cup qualification
Alex Tobin	Australia	68	19-06-1997	Sydney	Tahiti	2–0	1998 FIFA World Cup qualification
Alex Tobin	Australia	69	28-06-1997	Auckland	New Zealand	3–0	1998 FIFA World Cup qualification
Alex Tobin	Australia	70	06-07-1997	Sydney	New Zealand	2–0	1998 FIFA World Cup qualification
Alex Tobin	Australia	71	01-10-1997	Tunis	Tunisia	3–0	
Alex Tobin	Australia	72	22-11-1997	Tehran	Iran	1–1	1998 FIFA World Cup qualification
Alex Tobin	Australia	73	29-11-1997	Melbourne	Iran	2–2	1998 FIFA World Cup qualification
Alex Tobin	Australia	74	12-12-1997	Riyadh	Mexico	3–1	1997 FIFA Confederations Cup
Alex Tobin	Australia	75	14-12-1997	Riyadh	Brazil	0–0	1997 FIFA Confederations Cup
Alex Tobin	Australia	76	16-12-1997	Riyadh	Saudi Arabia	0–1	1997 FIFA Confederations Cup
Alex Tobin	Australia	77	19-12-1997	Riyadh	Uruguay	1–0	1997 FIFA Confederations Cup
Alex Tobin	Australia	78	21-12-1997	Riyadh	Brazil	0–6	1997 FIFA Confederations Cup
Alex Tobin	Australia	79	07-02-1998	Melbourne	Chile	0–1	
Alex Tobin	Australia	80	11-02-1998	Sydney	South Korea	1–0	
Alex Tobin	Australia	81	15-02-1998	Adelaide	Japan	0–3	
Alex Tobin	Australia	82	06-06-1998	Zagreb	Croatia	0–7	
Alex Tobin	Australia	83	25-09-1998	Brisbane	Fiji	3–1	1998 OFC Nations Cup
Alex Tobin	Australia	84	28-09-1998	Brisbane	Cook Islands	16–0	1998 OFC Nations Cup
Alex Tobin	Australia	85	02-10-1998	Brisbane	Tahiti	4–1	1998 OFC Nations Cup
Alex Tobin	Australia	86	04-10-1998	Brisbane	New Zealand	0–1	1998 OFC Nations Cup
Alex Tobin	Australia	87	06-11-1998	San Jose	United States	0–0	
Ivan Vicelich	New Zealand	87	09-09-2013	Riyadh	United Arab Emirates	0–2	2013 OSN Cup
Ivan Vicelich	New Zealand	88	14-11-2013	Mexico City	Mexico	1–5	2014 FIFA World Cup qualification
Chris Wood	New Zealand	88	14-10-2025	Oslo	Norway	1–1	
Chris Wood	New Zealand	89	02-06-2026	Fort Lauderdale	Haiti	4–0	
Chris Wood	New Zealand	90	06-06-2026	Tampa	England	1–0	
Chris Wood	New Zealand	91	16-06-2026	Inglewood	Iran	2–2	2026 FIFA World Cup
Chris Wood	New Zealand	92	21-06-2026	Vancouver	Egypt	1–3	2026 FIFA World Cup
Chris Wood	New Zealand	93	27-06-2026	Vancouver	Belgium	1–5	2026 FIFA World Cup
Chris Wood	New Zealand	94	01-10-2026	Yokohama	Panama	1–1	Kirin Cup Soccer
Chris Wood	New Zealand	95	05-10-2026	Tokyo	Japan	2–1	Kirin Cup Soccer
Chris Wood	New Zealand	96	12-11-2026	Auckland	India	5–0	
Chris Wood	New Zealand	97	15-11-2026	Christchurch	India	3–0	

== See also ==
- Progression of association football caps record
- Progression of association football goalscoring Oceania record
- List of men's footballers with 100 or more international caps
