= Björn Nordqvist =

Swedish footballer

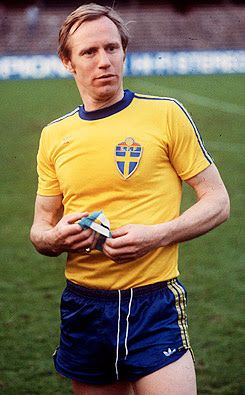
- Nordqvist in 1968

Personal information
- Birth name: Björn Axel Göte Nordqvist
- Date of birth: 6 October 1942 (age 84)
- Place of birth: Hallsberg, Sweden
- Position: Centre back

Youth career
- IFK Hallsberg

Senior career*
Years	Team	Apps	(Gls)
1961–1972	IFK Norrköping	245	(7)
1972–1975	PSV Eindhoven	101	(0)
1975–1978	IFK Göteborg	83	(2)
1979–1980	Minnesota Kicks	61	(1)
1979–1981	Minnesota Kicks (indoor)	28	(7)
1980–1983	Örgryte IS	72	(0)
1984	Landskrona BoIS	5	(0)
1988	Hovås IF		

International career
1960–1964	Sweden U23	11	(1)
1962–1963	Sweden B	4	(0)
1963–1978	Sweden	115	(0)
- * Club domestic league appearances and goals

Björn Axel Göte Nordqvist (born 6 October 1942) is a Swedish former professional footballer who played as a defender. A full international between 1963 and 1978, he won 115 caps for the Sweden national team and represented his country at the 1970, 1974, and 1978 FIFA World Cups. In 1968, he was awarded Guldbollen as Sweden's best footballer of the year.

== Career ==
During the 1960s and 1970s Nordqvist was captain of the Sweden national team. He played at the 1970, 1974 and 1978 FIFA World Cups and in total won 115 international caps, which was recognized a world record at the time. It was discovered only in 2021 that Soh Chin Ann of Malaysia surpassed Bobby Moore's then record in 1977 and eventually also concluded his career with 195 caps in 1984, thereby annulling the putative records of Nordqvist and his successors throughout the decades. Nordqvist was the most capped Swedish player until Thomas Ravelli overtook by playing his 116th game for Sweden at the semifinal of the 1994 FIFA World Cup.

At club level, Nordqvist won the Swedish Championship title with IFK Norrköping in 1962 and 1963 and also won Dutch league and cup winners medals with PSV Eindhoven. He was awarded the Guldbollen as Swedish footballer of the year in 1968 and was later inducted to the Hall of Fame of Swedish football.

Nordqvist also played ice hockey and bandy on a national level.

== Honours ==
Individual

- Årets ärkeängel: 1977
- Guldbollen: 1968

== See also ==
- List of footballers with 100 or more caps
