= Progression of association football caps South American record =

This is a progressive list of men's association footballers who have held or co-held the South American record for international caps since 1902.

== Criteria ==
The criteria used by national FAs in considering a match as a full international were not historically fixed. Particularly for the early decades, and until more recently for FAs outside UEFA and CONMEBOL, counts of caps were often considered unreliable. RSSSF and IFFHS have spent much effort trying to produce definitive lists of full international matches, and corresponding data on players' international caps and goals. Using this data, the following records can be retrospectively produced. Note that, at the time, these records may not have been recognised.

== South American record ==
Player	Country	Cap	Date	Venue	Opponent	Score	Notes
Jorge Brown	Argentina	6	1907-08-15	Buenos Aires	Uruguay	2–1	Copa Lipton
Jorge Brown	Argentina	7	1908-08-15	Montevideo	Uruguay	2–2	Copa Lipton
Jorge Brown	Argentina	8	1908-10-04	Buenos Aires	Uruguay	0–1	Copa Premier Honor Argentino
Jorge Brown	Argentina	9	1909-08-15	Buenos Aires	Uruguay	2–1	Copa Lipton
Jorge Brown	Argentina	10	1909-09-19	Montevideo	Uruguay	2–2	Copa Newton
Jorge Brown	Argentina	11	1909-10-10	Buenos Aires	Uruguay	3–1	Copa Premier Honor Argentino
Jorge Brown	Argentina	12	1910-06-05	Buenos Aires	Chile	5–1	
Jorge Brown	Argentina	13	1910-06-12	Buenos Aires	Uruguay	4–1	South America Cup
Jorge Brown	Argentina	14	1910-08-15	Buenos Aires	Uruguay	1–3	
Juan Domingo Brown	Argentina	14	1910-11-13	Buenos Aires	Uruguay	1–1	
Juan Domingo Brown	Argentina	15	1910-11-27	Buenos Aires	Uruguay	2–6	
Juan Domingo Brown	Argentina	16	1911-08-15	Buenos Aires	Uruguay	0–2	
Juan Domingo Brown	Argentina	17	1911-09-17	Montevideo	Uruguay	3–2	
Juan Domingo Brown	Argentina	18	1911-10-08	Montevideo	Uruguay	1–1	
Juan Domingo Brown	Argentina	19	1911-10-22	Buenos Aires	Uruguay	2–0	
Juan Domingo Brown	Argentina	20	1911-10-29	Montevideo	Uruguay	0–3	
Juan Domingo Brown	Argentina	21	1912-08-15	Montevideo	Uruguay	0–2	
Juan Domingo Brown	Argentina	22	1912-08-25	Montevideo	Uruguay	0–3	
Juan Domingo Brown	Argentina	23	1912-10-06	Avellaneda	Uruguay	3–3	
Juan Domingo Brown	Argentina	24	1912-12-01	Montevideo	Uruguay	3–1	
Juan Domingo Brown	Argentina	25	1913-06-15	Avellaneda	Uruguay	1–1	
Juan Domingo Brown	Argentina	26	1913-07-09	Avellaneda	Uruguay	2–1	
Juan Domingo Brown	Argentina	27	1913-08-15	Avellaneda	Uruguay	4–0	
Juan Domingo Brown	Argentina	28	1913-10-05	Montevideo	Uruguay	0–1	
Juan Domingo Brown	Argentina	29	1913-10-26	Montevideo	Uruguay	0–1	
Juan Domingo Brown	Argentina	30	1915-07-18	Montevideo	Uruguay	3–2	
Juan Domingo Brown	Argentina	31	1915-08-15	Buenos Aires	Uruguay	2–1	
Juan Domingo Brown	Argentina	32	1915-09-12	Montevideo	Uruguay	0–2	
Juan Domingo Brown	Argentina	33	1916-07-06	Buenos Aires	Chile	6–1	
Juan Domingo Brown	Argentina	34	1916-07-10	Buenos Aires	Brazil	1–1	
Juan Domingo Brown	Argentina	35	1916-08-15	Montevideo	Uruguay	2–1	
Juan Domingo Brown	Argentina	36	1916-10-01	Avellaneda	Uruguay	7–2	
Cayetano Saporiti	Uruguay	36	1916-10-29	Montevideo	Argentina	3–1	
Cayetano Saporiti	Uruguay	37	1917-07-18	Montevideo	Argentina	0–2	Copa Premier Honor Uruguayo
Cayetano Saporiti	Uruguay	38	1917-09-02	Montevideo	Argentina	1–0	Copa Newton
Cayetano Saporiti	Uruguay	39	1917-09-30	Montevideo	Chile	4–0	1917 South American Championship
Cayetano Saporiti	Uruguay	40	1917-10-07	Montevideo	Brazil	4–0	1917 South American Championship
Cayetano Saporiti	Uruguay	41	1917-10-14	Montevideo	Argentina	1–0	1917 South American Championship
Cayetano Saporiti	Uruguay	42	1918-07-18	Montevideo	Argentina	1–1	Copa Premier Honor Uruguayo
Cayetano Saporiti	Uruguay	43	1918-07-28	Montevideo	Argentina	3–1	Copa Premier Honor Uruguayo
Cayetano Saporiti	Uruguay	44	1918-08-15	Buenos Aires	Argentina	0–0	Copa Premier Honor Uruguayo
Cayetano Saporiti	Uruguay	45	1918-08-25	Buenos Aires	Argentina	1–2	Copa Premier Honor Uruguayo
Cayetano Saporiti	Uruguay	46	1918-08-25	Montevideo	Argentina	1–1	Copa Lipton
Cayetano Saporiti	Uruguay	47	1918-09-29	Buenos Aires	Argentina	0–2	Copa Newton
Cayetano Saporiti	Uruguay	48	1919-05-13	Rio de Janeiro	Argentina	3–2	1919 South American Championship
Cayetano Saporiti	Uruguay	49	1919-05-25	Rio de Janeiro	Brazil	2–2	1919 South American Championship
Cayetano Saporiti	Uruguay	50	1919-05-29	Rio de Janeiro	Brazil	0–1	1919 South American Championship
Ángel Romano	Uruguay	50	1922-10-12	Rio de Janeiro	Paraguay	0–1	1922 South American Championship
Ángel Romano	Uruguay	51	1922-11-12	Montevideo	Argentina	1–0	Copa Lipton
Ángel Romano	Uruguay	52	1923-06-24	Buenos Aires	Argentina	0–0	Copa Lipton
Ángel Romano	Uruguay	53	1923-07-15	Buenos Aires	Argentina	2–2	Copa Premier Honor Uruguayo
Ángel Romano	Uruguay	54	1923-07-22	Montevideo	Argentina	2–2	Copa Premier Honor Uruguayo
Ángel Romano	Uruguay	55	1923-09-30	Montevideo	Argentina	2–0	Copa Premier Honor Uruguayo
Ángel Romano	Uruguay	56	1924-05-26	Colombes	Yugoslavia	7–0	Summer Olympics
Ángel Romano	Uruguay	57	1924-05-29	Paris	United States	3–0	Summer Olympics
Ángel Romano	Uruguay	58	1924-06-01	Colombes	France	5–1	Summer Olympics
Ángel Romano	Uruguay	59	1924-06-01	Colombes	Netherlands	2–1	Summer Olympics
Ángel Romano	Uruguay	60	1924-06-09	Colombes	Switzerland	3–0	Summer Olympics
Ángel Romano	Uruguay	61	1924-09-21	Montevideo	Argentina	1–1	
Ángel Romano	Uruguay	62	1924-09-28	Buenos Aires	Argentina	0–0	
Ángel Romano	Uruguay	63	1924-10-02	Buenos Aires	Argentina	1–2	1924 South American Championship
Ángel Romano	Uruguay	64	1924-10-19	Montevideo	Chile	5–0	1924 South American Championship
Ángel Romano	Uruguay	65	1924-10-26	Montevideo	Paraguay	3–1	1924 South American Championship
Ángel Romano	Uruguay	66	1924-11-02	Montevideo	Argentina	0–0	1924 South American Championship
Ángel Romano	Uruguay	67	1926-10-28	Santiago	Bolivia	6–0	1926 South American Championship
Ángel Romano	Uruguay	68	1926-11-01	Santiago	Paraguay	6–1	1926 South American Championship
Ángel Romano	Uruguay	69	1927-07-14	Montevideo	Argentina	0–1	Copa Newton
Américo Gallego	Argentina	69	1982-05-12	Rosario	Romania	1–0	
Américo Gallego	Argentina	70	1982-06-13	Barcelona	Belgium	0–1	1982 FIFA World Cup
Américo Gallego	Argentina	71	1982-06-18	Alicante	Hungary	4–1	1982 FIFA World Cup
Américo Gallego	Argentina	72	1982-06-23	Alicante	El Salvador	2–0	1982 FIFA World Cup
Américo Gallego	Argentina	73	1982-06-29	Barcelona	Italy	1–2	1982 FIFA World Cup
Diego Simeone	Argentina	73	1998-06-30	Saint-Étienne	England	2–2	1998 FIFA World Cup
Diego Simeone	Argentina	74	1998-07-04	Marseille	Netherlands	1–2	1998 FIFA World Cup
Diego Simeone	Argentina	75	1999-06-09	Chicago	Mexico	2–2	
Diego Simeone	Argentina	76	1999-06-13	Washington, D.C.	United States	0–1	
Diego Simeone	Argentina	77	1999-06-26	Buenos Aires	Lithuania	0–0	
Diego Simeone	Argentina	78	1999-07-01	Luque	Ecuador	3–1	1999 Copa América
Diego Simeone	Argentina	79	1999-07-04	Luque	Colombia	0–3	1999 Copa América
Diego Simeone	Argentina	80	1999-07-07	Luque	Uruguay	2–0	1999 Copa América
Diego Simeone	Argentina	81	1999-07-11	Ciudad del Este	Brazil	1–2	1999 Copa América
Diego Simeone	Argentina	82	1999-09-04	Buenos Aires	Brazil	2–0	
Diego Simeone	Argentina	83	1999-09-07	Porto Alegre	Brazil	2–4	
Diego Simeone	Argentina	84	1999-10-13	Córdoba	Colombia	2–1	
Diego Simeone	Argentina	85	1999-11-17	Seville	Spain	2–0	
Diego Simeone	Argentina	86	2000-02-23	London	England	0–0	
Diego Simeone	Argentina	87	2000-03-29	Buenos Aires	Chile	4–1	2002 FIFA World Cup qualification
Diego Simeone	Argentina	88	2000-04-26	Maracaibo	Venezuela	4–0	2002 FIFA World Cup qualification
Diego Simeone	Argentina	89	2000-06-04	Buenos Aires	Bolivia	1–0	2002 FIFA World Cup qualification
Diego Simeone	Argentina	90	2000-06-29	Bogotá	Colombia	3–1	2002 FIFA World Cup qualification
Diego Simeone	Argentina	91	2000-07-19	Buenos Aires	Ecuador	2–0	2002 FIFA World Cup qualification
Diego Simeone	Argentina	92	2000-07-26	São Paulo	Brazil	1–3	2002 FIFA World Cup qualification
Diego Simeone	Argentina	93	2000-08-16	Buenos Aires	Paraguay	1–1	2002 FIFA World Cup qualification
Diego Simeone	Argentina	94	2000-09-03	Lima	Peru	2–1	2002 FIFA World Cup qualification
Diego Simeone	Argentina	95	2000-10-08	Buenos Aires	Uruguay	2–1	2002 FIFA World Cup qualification
Diego Simeone	Argentina	96	2000-12-20	Los Angeles	Mexico	2–0	
Diego Simeone	Argentina	97	2001-02-28	Rome	Italy	2–1	
Diego Simeone	Argentina	98	2001-03-28	Buenos Aires	Venezuela	5–0	2002 FIFA World Cup qualification
Diego Simeone	Argentina	99	2001-04-25	La Paz	Bolivia	3–3	2002 FIFA World Cup qualification
Diego Simeone	Argentina	100	2001-06-03	Buenos Aires	Colombia	3–0	2002 FIFA World Cup qualification
Diego Simeone	Argentina	101	2001-08-15	Quito	Ecuador	2–0	2002 FIFA World Cup qualification
Diego Simeone	Argentina	102	2001-09-05	Buenos Aires	Brazil	2–1	2002 FIFA World Cup qualification
Cafu	Brazil	102	2002-03-27	Fortaleza	Yugoslavia	1–0	
Cafu	Brazil	103	2002-04-17	Lisbon	Portugal	1–1	
Cafu	Brazil	104	2002-05-25	Kuala Lumpur	Malaysia	4–0	
Cafu	Brazil	105	2002-06-03	Ulsan	Turkey	2–1	2002 FIFA World Cup
Cafu	Brazil	106	2002-06-08	Seogwipo	China	4–0	2002 FIFA World Cup
Cafu	Brazil	107	2002-06-13	Suwon	Costa Rica	5–2	2002 FIFA World Cup
Cafu	Brazil	108	2002-06-17	Kobe	Belgium	2–0	2002 FIFA World Cup
Cafu	Brazil	109	2002-06-21	Shizuoka	England	2–1	2002 FIFA World Cup
Cafu	Brazil	110	2002-06-26	Saitama	Turkey	1–0	2002 FIFA World Cup
Cafu	Brazil	111	2002-06-30	Yokohama	Germany	2–0	2002 FIFA World Cup
Cafu	Brazil	112	2002-08-21	Fortaleza	Paraguay	0–1	
Cafu	Brazil	113	2002-11-20	Seoul	South Korea	3–2	
Cafu	Brazil	114	2003-02-12	Guangdong	China	0–0	
Cafu	Brazil	115	2003-03-29	Porto	Portugal	1–2	
Cafu	Brazil	116	2003-09-06	Barranquilla	Colombia	2–1	2006 FIFA World Cup qualification
Cafu	Brazil	117	2003-09-10	Manaus	Ecuador	1–0	2006 FIFA World Cup qualification
Cafu	Brazil	118	2003-10-12	Leicester	Jamaica	1–0	
Cafu	Brazil	119	2003-11-16	Lima	Peru	1–1	2006 FIFA World Cup qualification
Cafu	Brazil	120	2003-11-19	Curitiba	Uruguay	3–3	2006 FIFA World Cup qualification
Cafu	Brazil	121	2004-02-18	Dublin	Republic of Ireland	0–0	
Cafu	Brazil	122	2004-04-28	Asunción	Paraguay	0–0	2006 FIFA World Cup qualification
Cafu	Brazil	123	2004-04-28	Budapest	Hungary	4–1	
Cafu	Brazil	124	2004-05-20	Saint-Denis	France	0–0	
Cafu	Brazil	125	2004-06-02	Belo Horizonte	Argentina	3–1	2006 FIFA World Cup qualification
Cafu	Brazil	126	2004-06-06	Santiago	Chile	1–1	2006 FIFA World Cup qualification
Cafu	Brazil	127	2004-10-09	Maracaibo	Venezuela	5–2	2006 FIFA World Cup qualification
Cafu	Brazil	128	2004-10-13	Maceió	Colombia	0–0	2006 FIFA World Cup qualification
Cafu	Brazil	129	2004-11-17	Quito	Ecuador	0–1	2006 FIFA World Cup qualification
Cafu	Brazil	130	2005-02-09	Hong Kong	Hong Kong	7–1	Carlsberg Cup
Cafu	Brazil	131	2005-03-27	Goiânia	Peru	1–0	2006 FIFA World Cup qualification
Cafu	Brazil	132	2005-03-30	Montevideo	Uruguay	1–1	2006 FIFA World Cup qualification
Cafu	Brazil	133	2005-06-08	Buenos Aires	Argentina	1–3	2006 FIFA World Cup qualification
Cafu	Brazil	134	2005-08-17	Split	Croatia	1–1	
Cafu	Brazil	135	2005-09-04	Brasília	Chile	5–0	2006 FIFA World Cup qualification
Cafu	Brazil	136	2005-10-12	Belém	Venezuela	3–0	2006 FIFA World Cup qualification
Cafu	Brazil	137	2005-11-12	Abu Dhabi	United Arab Emirates	8–0	
Cafu	Brazil	138	2006-06-04	Geneva	New Zealand	4–0	
Cafu	Brazil	139	2006-06-13	Berlin	Croatia	1–0	2006 FIFA World Cup
Cafu	Brazil	140	2006-06-18	Munich	Australia	2–0	2006 FIFA World Cup
Cafu	Brazil	141	2006-06-27	Dortmund	Ghana	3–0	2006 FIFA World Cup
Cafu	Brazil	142	2006-07-01	Frankfurt	France	0–1	2006 FIFA World Cup
Iván Hurtado	Ecuador	142	2007-08-22	Quito	Bolivia	1–0	
Iván Hurtado	Ecuador	143	2007-09-08	Quito	El Salvador	5–1	
Iván Hurtado	Ecuador	144	2007-10-13	Quito	Venezuela	0–1	2010 FIFA World Cup qualification
Iván Hurtado	Ecuador	145	2007-10-17	Rio de Janeiro	Brazil	0–5	2010 FIFA World Cup qualification
Iván Hurtado	Ecuador	146	2007-11-21	Quito	Peru	5–1	2010 FIFA World Cup qualification
Iván Hurtado	Ecuador	147	2008-03-26	Latacunga	Haiti	3–1	
Iván Hurtado	Ecuador	148	2008-05-26	Grenoble	France	0–2	
Iván Hurtado	Ecuador	149	2008-06-15	Buenos Aires	Argentina	1–1	2010 FIFA World Cup qualification
Iván Hurtado	Ecuador	150	2008-06-18	Quito	Colombia	0–0	2010 FIFA World Cup qualification
Iván Hurtado	Ecuador	151	2008-08-20	East Rutherford	Colombia	1–0	
Iván Hurtado	Ecuador	152	2008-09-06	Quito	Bolivia	3–1	2010 FIFA World Cup qualification
Iván Hurtado	Ecuador	153	2008-09-10	Montevideo	Uruguay	0–0	2010 FIFA World Cup qualification
Iván Hurtado	Ecuador	154	2008-10-12	Quito	Chile	1–0	2010 FIFA World Cup qualification
Iván Hurtado	Ecuador	155	2008-10-15	Puerto la Cruz	Venezuela	1–3	2010 FIFA World Cup qualification
Iván Hurtado	Ecuador	156	2008-12-17	Muscat	Iran	1–0	
Iván Hurtado	Ecuador	157	2008-12-19	Muscat	Oman	0–2	
Iván Hurtado	Ecuador	158	2009-03-29	Quito	Brazil	1–1	2010 FIFA World Cup qualification
Iván Hurtado	Ecuador	159	2009-04-01	Quito	Paraguay	1–1	2010 FIFA World Cup qualification
Iván Hurtado	Ecuador	160	2009-06-10	Quito	Argentina	2–0	2010 FIFA World Cup qualification
Iván Hurtado	Ecuador	161	2009-08-12	East Rutherford	Jamaica	0–0	
Iván Hurtado	Ecuador	162	2009-09-05	Medellín	Colombia	0–2	2010 FIFA World Cup qualification
Iván Hurtado	Ecuador	163	2009-09-09	La Paz	Bolivia	3–1	2010 FIFA World Cup qualification
Iván Hurtado	Ecuador	164	2009-10-10	Quito	Uruguay	1–2	2010 FIFA World Cup qualification
Iván Hurtado	Ecuador	165	2009-10-14	Santiago	Chile	0–1	2010 FIFA World Cup qualification
Iván Hurtado	Ecuador	166	2010-05-07	East Rutherford	Mexico	0–0	
Iván Hurtado	Ecuador	167	2010-05-16	Seoul	South Korea	0–2	
Iván Hurtado	Ecuador	168	2014-10-14	Harrison	El Salvador	5–1	
Lionel Messi	Argentina	168	2022-11-30	Doha	Poland	0–2	2022 FIFA World Cup
Lionel Messi	Argentina	169	2022-12-03	Al Rayyan	Australia	2–1	2022 FIFA World Cup
Lionel Messi	Argentina	170	2022-12-09	Lusail	Netherlands	2–2	2022 FIFA World Cup
Lionel Messi	Argentina	171	2022-12-13	Lusail	Croatia	3–0	2022 FIFA World Cup
Lionel Messi	Argentina	172	2022-12-18	Lusail	France	3–3	2022 FIFA World Cup
Lionel Messi	Argentina	173	2023-03-23	Buenos Aires	Panama	2–0	
Lionel Messi	Argentina	174	2023-03-28	Santiago del Estero	Curaçao	7–0	
Lionel Messi	Argentina	175	2023-06-15	Beijing	Australia	2–0	
Lionel Messi	Argentina	176	2023-09-07	Buenos Aires	Ecuador	1–0	2026 FIFA World Cup qualification
Lionel Messi	Argentina	177	2023-10-12	Buenos Aires	Paraguay	1–0	2026 FIFA World Cup qualification
Lionel Messi	Argentina	178	2023-10-17	Lima	Peru	0–2	2026 FIFA World Cup qualification
Lionel Messi	Argentina	179	2023-11-16	Buenos Aires	Uruguay	0–2	2026 FIFA World Cup qualification
Lionel Messi	Argentina	180	2023-11-21	Rio de Janeiro	Brazil	0–1	2026 FIFA World Cup qualification
Lionel Messi	Argentina	181	2024-06-09	Chicago	Ecuador	1–0	
Lionel Messi	Argentina	182	2024-06-14	Landover	Guatemala	4–1	
Lionel Messi	Argentina	183	2024-06-20	Atlanta	Canada	2–0	2024 Copa América
Lionel Messi	Argentina	184	2024-06-25	East Rutherford	Chile	1–0	2024 Copa América
Lionel Messi	Argentina	185	2024-07-04	Houston	Ecuador	1–1	2024 Copa América
Lionel Messi	Argentina	186	2024-07-09	East Rutherford	Canada	2–0	2024 Copa América
Lionel Messi	Argentina	187	2024-07-14	Miami Gardens	Colombia	1–0	2024 Copa América
Lionel Messi	Argentina	188	2024-10-10	Maturín	Venezuela	1–1	2026 FIFA World Cup qualification
Lionel Messi	Argentina	189	2024-10-15	Buenos Aires	Bolivia	6–0	2026 FIFA World Cup qualification
Lionel Messi	Argentina	190	2024-11-15	Asunción	Paraguay	2–1	2026 FIFA World Cup qualification
Lionel Messi	Argentina	191	2024-11-19	Buenos Aires	Peru	1–0	2026 FIFA World Cup qualification
Lionel Messi	Argentina	192	2024-06-05	Santiago	Chile	0–1	2026 FIFA World Cup qualification
Lionel Messi	Argentina	193	2024-06-11	Buenos Aires	Colombia	1–1	2026 FIFA World Cup qualification
Lionel Messi	Argentina	194	2024-09-04	Buenos Aires	Venezuela	3–0	2026 FIFA World Cup qualification
Lionel Messi	Argentina	195	2024-10-14	Fort Lauderdale	Puerto Rico	0–6	
Lionel Messi	Argentina	196	2024-11-14	Luanda	Angola	0–2	
Lionel Messi	Argentina	197	2026-03-27	Buenos Aires	Mauritania	2–1	
Lionel Messi	Argentina	198	2026-03-31	Buenos Aires	Zambia	5–0	
Lionel Messi	Argentina	199	2026-06-09	Auburn	Iceland	3–0	
Lionel Messi	Argentina	200	2026-06-16	Kansas City	Algeria	3–0	2026 FIFA World Cup
Lionel Messi	Argentina	201	2026-06-22	Arlington	Austria	2–0	2026 FIFA World Cup
Lionel Messi	Argentina	202	2026-06-27	Arlington	Jordan	1–3	2026 FIFA World Cup
Lionel Messi	Argentina	203	2026-07-03	Miami Gardens	Cape Verde	3–2	2026 FIFA World Cup
Lionel Messi	Argentina	204	2026-07-07	Atlanta	Egypt	3–2	2026 FIFA World Cup
Lionel Messi	Argentina	205	2026-07-11	Kansas City	Switzerland	3–1	2026 FIFA World Cup
Lionel Messi	Argentina	206	2026-07-15	Atlanta	England	1–2	2026 FIFA World Cup
Lionel Messi	Argentina	207	2026-07-19	East Rutherford	Spain	1–0	2026 FIFA World Cup
Lionel Messi	Argentina	208	2026-10-06	Buenos Aires	Benin	3–0	

== See also ==
- Progression of association football caps record (world record)
- List of men's footballers with 100 or more international caps
