= Progression of association football caps record =

This is a progressive list of men's association footballers who have held or co-held the world record for international caps, beginning with Billy MacKinnon, the only man to play in all of Scotland's first seven internationals.

== Criteria ==
The criteria used by national FAs in considering a match as a full international were not historically fixed. Particularly for the early decades, and until more recently for FAs outside UEFA and CONMEBOL, counts of caps were often considered unreliable. RSSSF and IFFHS have spent much effort trying to produce definitive lists of full international matches, and corresponding data on players' international caps and goals. Using this data, the following records can be retrospectively produced. Note that, at the time, these records may not have been recognised.

One point of note is that early matches by the England Amateur side were played against the full national side of opponents. These matches are counted as full internationals by the IFFHS and the opposing FAs, though not by the (English) FA. This affects Vivian Woodward, who won 23 full caps and 30 amateur caps; the IFFHS considers him as the record-holder from 1909, when his total of 31 caps included 11 amateur matches.

Before 1977, the world record holder was always European, except when Ángel Romano narrowly overtook Imre Schlosser. After 1977, many sources, including FIFA and the Guinness Book of Records, reported later European cap records as world records. Subsequent validation of the caps claimed by Cha Bum-Kun, Hussein Saeed, Majed Abdullah, and Adnan Al Talyani has shown that, even stripping out ineligible matches, these players exceeded the contemporary European counts. Similarly, Hossam Hassan of Egypt was reported as having broken Lothar Matthäus' putative record of 150 caps in 2001.

In August 2021, four retired Malaysian internationals were retrospectively admitted to the FIFA Century Club, with Soh Chin Ann's 1984 appearance against North Yemen recognised as a record 195th cap, thereby annulling the putative record totals achieved in intervening decades by Cha, Saeed, Abdullah, Al Talyani, Claudio Suárez, Mohamed Al-Deayea, Ahmed Hassan, and Bader Al Mutawa.

On 14 June 2022, Bader Al-Mutawa surpassed Soh Chin Ann's record of 195 matches recognised by FIFA and he become the men's all-time record appearance holder with 196 caps.

On 10 December 2022, Cristiano Ronaldo equalled Al Mutawa's record of 196 matches recognised by FIFA in the 2022 FIFA World Cup quarter-finals against Morocco in Qatar.

On 23 March 2023, Cristiano Ronaldo surpassed Al Mutawa and become the men's all-time record appearance holder with 197 caps.

On 20 June 2023, he reached 200 matches and become the first male professional footballer to do it.

The women's international cap record is 354, held by Kristine Lilly of the United States, who exceeded Soh's total with her 196th cap against Norway in the 2000 Algarve Cup.

== World record ==
Player	Country	Cap	Date	Venue	Opponent	Score	Notes
Billy MacKinnon	Scotland	7	3 March 1877	Kennington Oval	England	3–1	
Billy MacKinnon	Scotland	8	2 March 1878	Hampden Park	England	7–2	
Billy MacKinnon	Scotland	9	5 April 1879	Kennington Oval	England	4–5	
Henry McNeil	Scotland	9	12 March 1881	Kennington Oval	England	6–1	
Henry McNeil	Scotland	10	14 March 1881	Acton Park, Wrexham	Wales	5–1	
John Price	Wales	10	25 March 1882	Glasgow	Scotland	0–5	
John Price	Wales	11	12 March 1883	Wrexham	Scotland	0–3	
John Price	Wales	12	17 March 1883	Belfast	Ireland	1–1	
Norman Bailey	England	12	17 March 1884	Racecourse Ground	Wales	4–0	1884 British Home Championship
Norman Bailey	England	13	28 February 1885	Whalley Range, Blackburn	Ireland	4–0	1885 British Home Championship
Norman Bailey	England	14	14 March 1885	Leamington Road	Wales	1–1	1885 British Home Championship
Norman Bailey	England	15	21 March 1885	Kennington Oval	Scotland	1–1	1885 British Home Championship
Norman Bailey	England	16	27 March 1886	Hampden Park	Scotland	1–1	1886 British Home Championship
Norman Bailey	England	17	29 March 1886	Racecourse Ground	Wales	3–1	1886 British Home Championship
Norman Bailey	England	18	26 February 1887	Kennington Oval	Wales	4–0	1887 British Home Championship
Norman Bailey	England	19	19 March 1887	Leamington Road	Scotland	2–3	1887 British Home Championship
Olphert Stanfield	Ireland	19	5 April 1893	Belfast	Wales	4–3	1893 British Home Championship
Olphert Stanfield	Ireland	20	24 February 1894	Swansea	Wales	1–4	1894 British Home Championship
Olphert Stanfield	Ireland	21	3 March 1894	Solitude	England	2–2	1894 British Home Championship
Olphert Stanfield	Ireland	22	31 March 1894	Belfast	Scotland	1–3	1894 British Home Championship
Olphert Stanfield	Ireland	23	9 March 1895	County Cricket Ground, Derby	England	0–9	1895 British Home Championship
Olphert Stanfield	Ireland	24	30 March 1895	Glasgow	Scotland	1–3	1895 British Home Championship
Olphert Stanfield	Ireland	26	7 March 1896	Solitude	England	0–2	1896 British Home Championship
Olphert Stanfield	Ireland	27	28 March 1896	Belfast	Scotland	3–3	1896 British Home Championship
Olphert Stanfield	Ireland	28	20 February 1897	Trent Bridge	England	0–6	1897 British Home Championship
Olphert Stanfield	Ireland	29	6 March 1897	Belfast	Wales	4–3	1897 British Home Championship
Olphert Stanfield	Ireland	30	27 March 1897	Glasgow	Scotland	1–5	1897 British Home Championship
Vivian Woodward	England	30	15 March 1909	Nottingham	Wales	2–0	1909 British Home Championship
Vivian Woodward	England	31	29 May 1909	Budapest	Hungary	4–2	
Vivian Woodward	England	32	31 May 1909	Budapest	Hungary	8–2	
Vivian Woodward	England	33	1 June 1909	Vienna	Austria	8–1	
Vivian Woodward	England Amateurs	34	6 November 1909	Hull	Sweden	7–0	
Vivian Woodward	England Amateurs	35	11 December 1909	London	Netherlands	9–1	
Vivian Woodward	England	36	12 February 1910	Belfast	Ireland	1–1	1910 British Home Championship
Billy Meredith	Wales	36	13 March 1911	London	England	0–3	1911 British Home Championship
Billy Meredith	Wales	37	2 March 1912	Edinburgh	Scotland	0–1	1912 British Home Championship
Billy Meredith	Wales	38	11 March 1912	Wrexham	England	0–2	1912 British Home Championship
Billy Meredith	Wales	39	13 April 1912	Cardiff	Ireland	2–3	1912 British Home Championship
Billy Meredith	Wales	40	18 January 1913	Belfast	Ireland	1–0	1912 British Home Championship
Billy Meredith	Wales	41	3 March 1913	Wrexham	Scotland	0–0	1913 British Home Championship
Billy Meredith	Wales	42	17 March 1913	Bristol	England	3–4	1913 British Home Championship
Billy Meredith	Wales	43	19 January 1914	Wrexham	Ireland	1–2	1914 British Home Championship
Billy Meredith	Wales	44	28 February 1914	Glasgow	Scotland	0–0	1914 British Home Championship
Billy Meredith	Wales	45	16 March 1914	Ninian Park	England	0–2	1914 British Home Championship
Imre Schlosser	Hungary	45	30 May 1915	Vienna	Austria	2–1	
Imre Schlosser	Hungary	46	3 October 1915	Vienna	Austria	2–4	
Imre Schlosser	Hungary	47	7 November 1915	Budapest	Austria	6–2	
Imre Schlosser	Hungary	48	4 June 1916	Budapest	Austria	2–1	
Imre Schlosser	Hungary	49	1 October 1916	Budapest	Austria	2–3	
Imre Schlosser	Hungary	50	5 November 1916	Vienna	Austria	3–3	
Imre Schlosser	Hungary	51	6 May 1917	Vienna	Austria	1–1	
Imre Schlosser	Hungary	52	3 June 1917	Budapest	Austria	6–2	
Imre Schlosser	Hungary	53	15 July 1917	Vienna	Austria	4–1	
Imre Schlosser	Hungary	54	7 October 1917	Budapest	Austria	2–1	
Imre Schlosser	Hungary	55	4 November 1917	Vienna	Austria	2–1	
Imre Schlosser	Hungary	56	14 April 1918	Budapest	Austria	2–0	
Imre Schlosser	Hungary	57	12 May 1918	Budapest	Switzerland	2–1	
Imre Schlosser	Hungary	58	2 June 1918	Vienna	Austria	2–0	
Imre Schlosser	Hungary	59	6 October 1918	Vienna	Austria	3–0	
Imre Schlosser	Hungary	60	9 November 1919	Budapest	Austria	3–2	
Imre Schlosser	Hungary	61	24 October 1920	Berlin	Germany	0–1	
Imre Schlosser	Hungary	62	24 April 1921	Vienna	Austria	1–4	
Imre Schlosser	Hungary	63	5 June 1921	Budapest	Germany	3–0	
Imre Schlosser	Hungary	64	6 November 1921	Budapest	Sweden	4–2	
Imre Schlosser	Hungary	65	18 December 1921	Budapest	Poland	1–0	
Ángel Romano	Uruguay	65	26 October 1924	Montevideo	Paraguay	3–1	1924 Copa América
Ángel Romano	Uruguay	66	2 November 1924	Montevideo	Argentina	0–0	1924 Copa América
Imre Schlosser	Hungary	66	6 June 1926	Budapest	Czechoslovakia	2–1	
Ángel Romano	Uruguay	67	28 October 1926	Santiago	Bolivia	6–0	1926 Copa América
Ángel Romano	Uruguay	68	1 November 1926	Santiago	Paraguay	6–1	1926 Copa América
Imre Schlosser	Hungary	68	10 April 1927	Vienna	Austria	0–6	
Ángel Romano	Uruguay	69	14 July 1927	Montevideo	Argentina	0–1	Copa Newton
Severino Minelli	Switzerland	69	12 November 1939	Zürich	Italy	3–1	
Severino Minelli	Switzerland	70	3 March 1940	Turin	Italy	1–1	
Severino Minelli	Switzerland	71	31 March 1940	Budapest	Hungary	0–3	
Severino Minelli	Switzerland	72	20 April 1941	Bern	Germany	2–1	
Severino Minelli	Switzerland	73	28 December 1941	Valencia	Spain	2–3	
Severino Minelli	Switzerland	74	1 January 1942	Lisbon	Portugal	0–3	
Severino Minelli	Switzerland	75	1 February 1942	Vienna	Germany	2–1	
Severino Minelli	Switzerland	76	8 March 1942	Marseille	France	2–0	
Severino Minelli	Switzerland	77	18 October 1942	Bern	Germany	3–5	
Severino Minelli	Switzerland	78	1 November 1942	Budapest	Hungary	0–3	
Severino Minelli	Switzerland	79	15 November 1942	Zürich	Sweden	3–1	
Severino Minelli	Switzerland	80	14 June 1943	Stockholm	Sweden	0–1	
Ferenc Puskás	Hungary	80	9 June 1956	Lisbon	Portugal	2–2	
Ferenc Puskás	Hungary	81	15 July 1956	Budapest	Poland	4–1	
Ferenc Puskás	Hungary	82	16 September 1956	Belgrade	Yugoslavia	3–1	Dr. Gerö Cup
Ferenc Puskás	Hungary	83	23 September 1956	Moscow	Soviet Union	1–0	
Ferenc Puskás	Hungary	84	7 October 1956	Paris	France	2–1	
Ferenc Puskás	Hungary	85	14 October 1956	Vienna	Austria	2–0	
Billy Wright	England	85	19 May 1957	Dublin	Republic of Ireland	1–1	1958 FIFA World Cup qualification
Billy Wright	England	86	19 October 1957	Cardiff	Wales	4–0	1957 British Home Championship
Billy Wright	England	87	6 November 1957	London	Northern Ireland	2–3	1957 British Home Championship
Billy Wright	England	88	27 November 1957	London	France	4–0	
Billy Wright	England	89	19 April 1958	Glasgow	Scotland	4–0	1958 British Home Championship
Billy Wright	England	90	7 May 1958	London	Portugal	2–1	
Billy Wright	England	91	11 May 1958	Belgrade	Yugoslavia	0–5	
Billy Wright	England	92	18 May 1958	Moscow	Soviet Union	1–1	
Billy Wright	England	93	8 June 1958	Gothenburg	Soviet Union	2–2	1958 FIFA World Cup
Billy Wright	England	94	11 June 1958	Gothenburg	Brazil	0–0	1958 FIFA World Cup
Billy Wright	England	95	15 June 1958	Borås	Austria	2–2	1958 FIFA World Cup
Billy Wright	England	96	17 June 1958	Gothenburg	Soviet Union	0–1	1958 FIFA World Cup
Billy Wright	England	97	4 October 1958	Belfast	Northern Ireland	3–3	1958 British Home Championship
Billy Wright	England	98	22 October 1958	London	Soviet Union	5–0	
Billy Wright	England	99	26 November 1958	Birmingham	Wales	2–2	1958 British Home Championship
Billy Wright	England	100	11 April 1959	London	Scotland	1–0	1959 British Home Championship
Billy Wright	England	101	6 May 1959	London	Italy	2–2	
Billy Wright	England	102	13 May 1959	Rio de Janeiro	Brazil	0–2	
Billy Wright	England	103	17 May 1959	Lima	Peru	1–4	
Billy Wright	England	104	24 May 1959	Mexico City	Mexico	1–2	
Billy Wright	England	105	28 May 1959	Los Angeles	United States	8–1	
Bobby Charlton	England	105	11 June 1970	Guadalajara	Czechoslovakia	1–0	1970 FIFA World Cup
Bobby Charlton	England	106	14 June 1970	León	West Germany	2–3	1970 FIFA World Cup
Bobby Moore	England	106	10 June 1973	Moscow	Soviet Union	2–1	
Bobby Moore	England	107	14 June 1973	Turin	Italy	0–2	
Bobby Moore	England	108	14 November 1973	London	Italy	0–1	
Soh Chin Ann	Malaysia	108	1 March 1977	Singapore	Thailand	6–4	1978 FIFA World Cup qualification
Soh Chin Ann	Malaysia	109	3 March 1977	Singapore	Indonesia	0–0	1978 FIFA World Cup qualification
Soh Chin Ann	Malaysia	110	6 March 1977	Singapore	Singapore	0–1	1978 FIFA World Cup qualification
Soh Chin Ann	Malaysia	111	8 March 1977	Singapore	Hong Kong	1–1	1978 FIFA World Cup qualification
Soh Chin Ann	Malaysia	112	16 July 1977	Kuala Lumpur	Burma	1–0	1977 Merdeka Tournament
Soh Chin Ann	Malaysia	113	18 July 1977	Kuala Lumpur	Thailand	3–0	1977 Merdeka Tournament
Soh Chin Ann	Malaysia	114	21 July 1977	Kuala Lumpur	Libya	1–1	1977 Merdeka Tournament
Soh Chin Ann	Malaysia	115	23 July 1977	Kuala Lumpur	Iraq	0–0	1977 Merdeka Tournament
Soh Chin Ann	Malaysia	116	26 July 1977	Kuala Lumpur	South Korea	1–1	1977 Merdeka Tournament
Soh Chin Ann	Malaysia	117	29 July 1977	Kuala Lumpur	Indonesia	5–1	1977 Merdeka Tournament
Soh Chin Ann	Malaysia	118	8 September 1977	Taegu	Bahrain	3–1	1977 President´s Cup
Soh Chin Ann	Malaysia	119	13 September 1977	Seoul	South Korea	0–3	1977 President´s Cup
Soh Chin Ann	Malaysia	120	15 September 1977	Seoul	Thailand	1–1	1977 President´s Cup
Soh Chin Ann	Malaysia	121	19 November 1977	Kuala Lumpur	Indonesia	1–2	1977 SEA Games
Soh Chin Ann	Malaysia	122	21 November 1977	Kuala Lumpur	Philippines	5–0	1977 SEA Games
Soh Chin Ann	Malaysia	123	25 November 1977	Kuala Lumpur	Burma	9–1	1977 SEA Games
Soh Chin Ann	Malaysia	124	26 November 1977	Kuala Lumpur	Thailand	2–0	1977 SEA Games
Soh Chin Ann	Malaysia	125	26 April 1978	Bangkok	Singapore	0–1	1978 King's Cup
Soh Chin Ann	Malaysia	126	5 May 1978	Bangkok	Singapore	3–2	1978 King's Cup
Soh Chin Ann	Malaysia	127	12 July 1978	Kuala Lumpur	South Korea	1–3	1978 Merdeka Tournament
Soh Chin Ann	Malaysia	128	14 July 1978	Kuala Lumpur	Singapore	6–0	1978 Merdeka Tournament
Soh Chin Ann	Malaysia	129	16 July 1978	Kuala Lumpur	Thailand	2–0	1978 Merdeka Tournament
Soh Chin Ann	Malaysia	130	19 July 1978	Kuala Lumpur	Indonesia	1–0	1978 Merdeka Tournament
Soh Chin Ann	Malaysia	131	21 July 1978	Kuala Lumpur	Japan	4–1	1978 Merdeka Tournament
Soh Chin Ann	Malaysia	132	23 July 1978	Kuala Lumpur	Syria	5–2	1978 Merdeka Tournament
Soh Chin Ann	Malaysia	133	26 July 1978	Kuala Lumpur	Iraq	1–2	1978 Merdeka Tournament
Soh Chin Ann	Malaysia	134	9 September 1978	Seoul	Bahrain	2–1	1978 President´s Cup
Soh Chin Ann	Malaysia	135	11 September 1978	Busan	South Korea	2–2	1978 President´s Cup
Soh Chin Ann	Malaysia	136	10 December 1978	Bangkok	India	1–0	8th Asian Games
Soh Chin Ann	Malaysia	137	12 December 1978	Bangkok	Bangladesh	1–0	8th Asian Games
Soh Chin Ann	Malaysia	138	17 December 1978	Bangkok	Thailand	1–2	8th Asian Games
Soh Chin Ann	Malaysia	139	18 December 1978	Bangkok	South Korea	0–1	8th Asian Games
Soh Chin Ann	Malaysia	140	19 December 1978	Bangkok	China	1–7	8th Asian Games
Soh Chin Ann	Malaysia	141	2 May 1979	Bangkok	Sri Lanka	3–1	1980 AFC Asian Cup qualification
Soh Chin Ann	Malaysia	142	5 May 1979	Bangkok	Indonesia	4–1	1980 AFC Asian Cup qualification
Soh Chin Ann	Malaysia	143	9 May 1979	Bangkok	North Korea	1–1	1980 AFC Asian Cup qualification
Soh Chin Ann	Malaysia	144	11 May 1979	Bangkok	Hong Kong	0–0	1980 AFC Asian Cup qualification
Soh Chin Ann	Malaysia	145	14 May 1979	Bangkok	North Korea	0–1	1980 AFC Asian Cup qualification
Soh Chin Ann	Malaysia	146	27 June 1979	Kuala Lumpur	Japan	1–1	1979 Merdeka Tournament
Soh Chin Ann	Malaysia	147	29 June 1979	Kuala Lumpur	Burma	4–1	1979 Merdeka Tournament
Soh Chin Ann	Malaysia	148	1 July 1979	Kuala Lumpur	Thailand	4–2	1979 Merdeka Tournament
Soh Chin Ann	Malaysia	149	4 July 1979	Kuala Lumpur	Indonesia	1–1	1979 Merdeka Tournament
Soh Chin Ann	Malaysia	150	9 July 1979	Kuala Lumpur	Singapore	3–0	1979 Merdeka Tournament
Soh Chin Ann	Malaysia	151	23 September 1979	Jakarta	Singapore	2–0	1979 SEA Games
Soh Chin Ann	Malaysia	152	25 September 1979	Jakarta	Burma	0–0	1979 SEA Games
Soh Chin Ann	Malaysia	153	26 September 1979	Jakarta	Indonesia	0–0	1979 SEA Games
Soh Chin Ann	Malaysia	154	28 September 1979	Jakarta	Thailand	1–0	1979 SEA Games
Soh Chin Ann	Malaysia	155	30 September 1979	Jakarta	Indonesia	1–0	1979 SEA Games
Soh Chin Ann	Malaysia	156	14 November 1979	Kuala Lumpur	Sweden	1–3	Friendly match
Soh Chin Ann	Malaysia	157	25 November 1979	Bangkok	Singapore	0–4	1979 King's Cup
Soh Chin Ann	Malaysia	158	12 March 1980	Kuala Lumpur	Saudi Arabia	3–0	Friendly match
Soh Chin Ann	Malaysia	159	16 March 1980	Kuala Lumpur	China	3–1	Friendly match
Soh Chin Ann	Malaysia	160	16 September 1980	Kuwait City	South Korea	1–1	1980 AFC Asian Cup
Soh Chin Ann	Malaysia	161	18 September 1980	Kuwait City	Kuwait	1–3	1980 AFC Asian Cup
Soh Chin Ann	Malaysia	162	20 September 1980	Kuwait City	United Arab Emirates	2–0	1980 AFC Asian Cup
Soh Chin Ann	Malaysia	163	22 September 1980	Kuwait City	Qatar	1–1	1980 AFC Asian Cup
Soh Chin Ann	Malaysia	164	15 October 1980	Kuala Lumpur	Morocco	2–0	1980 Merdeka Tournament
Soh Chin Ann	Malaysia	165	17 October 1980	Kuala Lumpur	Burma	3–2	1980 Merdeka Tournament
Soh Chin Ann	Malaysia	166	20 October 1980	Kuala Lumpur	Thailand	2–2	1980 Merdeka Tournament
Soh Chin Ann	Malaysia	167	23 October 1980	Kuala Lumpur	Indonesia	1–1	1980 Merdeka Tournament
Soh Chin Ann	Malaysia	168	27 October 1980	Kuala Lumpur	Kuwait	2–1	1980 Merdeka Tournament
Soh Chin Ann	Malaysia	169	30 October 1980	Kuala Lumpur	New Zealand	2–0	1980 Merdeka Tournament
Soh Chin Ann	Malaysia	170	2 November 1980	Kuala Lumpur	Morocco	1–2	1980 Merdeka Tournament
Soh Chin Ann	Malaysia	171	5 April 1981	Singapore	Singapore	1–1	1981 Ovaltine Cup
Soh Chin Ann	Malaysia	172	17 April 1981	Kuala Lumpur	Singapore	1–2	1981 Ovaltine Cup
Soh Chin Ann	Malaysia	173	21 April 1981	Kuwait City	South Korea	1–2	1982 FIFA World Cup qualification
Soh Chin Ann	Malaysia	174	25 April 1981	Kuwait City	Kuwait	0–4	1982 FIFA World Cup qualification
Soh Chin Ann	Malaysia	175	30 August 1981	Kuala Lumpur	Japan	0–2	1981 Merdeka Tournament
Soh Chin Ann	Malaysia	176	4 September 1981	Kuala Lumpur	New Zealand	0–1	1981 Merdeka Tournament
Soh Chin Ann	Malaysia	177	9 September 1981	Kuala Lumpur	Indonesia	2–0	1981 Merdeka Tournament
Soh Chin Ann	Malaysia	178	12 September 1981	Kuala Lumpur	United Arab Emirates	0–1	1981 Merdeka Tournament
Soh Chin Ann	Malaysia	179	28 May 1983	Singapore	Singapore	1–2	1983 SEA Games
Soh Chin Ann	Malaysia	180	30 May 1983	Singapore	Philippines	0–0	1983 SEA Games
Soh Chin Ann	Malaysia	181	5 June 1983	Singapore	Brunei	5–0	1983 SEA Games
Soh Chin Ann	Malaysia	182	19 September 1983	Kota Bharu	Nepal	7–0	1983 Merdeka Tournament
Soh Chin Ann	Malaysia	183	31 March 1984	Wellington	New Zealand	0–2	Friendly match
Soh Chin Ann	Malaysia	184	3 April 1984	Christchurch	New Zealand	1–6	Friendly match
Soh Chin Ann	Malaysia	185	8 April 1984	Auckland	New Zealand	0–0	Friendly match
Soh Chin Ann	Malaysia	186	12 August 1984	Kuala Lumpur	Singapore	1–0	1984 Ovaltine Cup
Soh Chin Ann	Malaysia	187	18 August 1984	Singapore	Singapore	1–1	1984 Ovaltine Cup
Soh Chin Ann	Malaysia	188	24 August 1984	Kuala Lumpur	Thailand	1–0	1984 Merdeka Tournament
Soh Chin Ann	Malaysia	189	26 August 1984	Kuala Lumpur	Indonesia	2–2	1984 Merdeka Tournament
Soh Chin Ann	Malaysia	190	29 August 1984	Kota Bharu	Liberia	3–1	1984 Merdeka Tournament
Soh Chin Ann	Malaysia	191	4 September 1984	Kuala Lumpur	Papua New Guinea	5–1	1984 Merdeka Tournament
Soh Chin Ann	Malaysia	192	11 October 1984	Calcutta	Pakistan	5–0	1984 AFC Asian Cup qualification
Soh Chin Ann	Malaysia	193	14 October 1984	Calcutta	India	1–2	1984 AFC Asian Cup qualification
Soh Chin Ann	Malaysia	194	16 October 1984	Calcutta	South Korea	0–0	1984 AFC Asian Cup qualification
Soh Chin Ann	Malaysia	195	18 October 1984	Calcutta	North Yemen	4–1	1984 AFC Asian Cup qualification
Bader Al-Mutawa	Kuwait	195	11 June 2022	Kuwait City	Nepal	4–1	2023 AFC Asian Cup qualification
Bader Al-Mutawa	Kuwait	196	14 June 2022	Kuwait City	Jordan	3–0	2023 AFC Asian Cup qualification
Cristiano Ronaldo	Portugal	196	10 December 2022	Doha	Morocco	1–0	2022 FIFA World Cup
Cristiano Ronaldo	Portugal	197	23 March 2023	Lisbon	Liechtenstein	4–0	UEFA Euro 2024 qualifying
Cristiano Ronaldo	Portugal	198	26 March 2023	Luxembourg	Luxembourg	6–0	UEFA Euro 2024 qualifying
Cristiano Ronaldo	Portugal	199	17 June 2023	Lisbon	Bosnia and Herzegovina	3–0	UEFA Euro 2024 qualifying
Cristiano Ronaldo	Portugal	200	20 June 2023	Reykjavík	Iceland	0–1	UEFA Euro 2024 qualifying
Cristiano Ronaldo	Portugal	201	8 September 2023	Trnava	Slovakia	0–1	UEFA Euro 2024 qualifying
Cristiano Ronaldo	Portugal	202	13 October 2023	Porto	Slovakia	3–2	UEFA Euro 2024 qualifying
Cristiano Ronaldo	Portugal	203	16 October 2023	Zenica	Bosnia and Herzegovina	0–5	UEFA Euro 2024 qualifying
Cristiano Ronaldo	Portugal	204	16 November 2023	Vaduz	Liechtenstein	0–2	UEFA Euro 2024 qualifying
Cristiano Ronaldo	Portugal	205	19 November 2023	Lisbon	Iceland	2–0	UEFA Euro 2024 qualifying
Cristiano Ronaldo	Portugal	206	26 March 2024	Ljubljana	Slovenia	2–0	Friendly match
Cristiano Ronaldo	Portugal	207	11 June 2024	Aveiro	Republic of Ireland	3–0	Friendly match
Cristiano Ronaldo	Portugal	208	18 June 2024	Leipzig	Czech Republic	2–1	UEFA Euro 2024
Cristiano Ronaldo	Portugal	209	22 June 2024	Dortmund	Turkey	3–0	UEFA Euro 2024
Cristiano Ronaldo	Portugal	210	26 June 2024	Gelsenkirchen	Georgia	2–0	UEFA Euro 2024
Cristiano Ronaldo	Portugal	211	1 July 2024	Frankfurt	Slovenia	0–0	UEFA Euro 2024
Cristiano Ronaldo	Portugal	212	5 July 2024	Hamburg	France	0–0	UEFA Euro 2024
Cristiano Ronaldo	Portugal	213	5 September 2024	Lisbon	Croatia	2–1	2024–25 UEFA Nations League
Cristiano Ronaldo	Portugal	214	8 September 2024	Lisbon	Scotland	2–1	2024–25 UEFA Nations League
Cristiano Ronaldo	Portugal	215	12 October 2024	Warsaw	Poland	1–3	2024–25 UEFA Nations League
Cristiano Ronaldo	Portugal	216	15 October 2024	Glasgow	Scotland	0–0	2024–25 UEFA Nations League
Cristiano Ronaldo	Portugal	217	15 November 2024	Porto	Poland	5–1	2024–25 UEFA Nations League
Cristiano Ronaldo	Portugal	218	20 March 2025	Copenhagen	Denmark	1–0	2024–25 UEFA Nations League
Cristiano Ronaldo	Portugal	219	23 March 2025	Lisbon	Denmark	5–2	2024–25 UEFA Nations League
Cristiano Ronaldo	Portugal	220	4 June 2025	Munich	Germany	1–2	2025 UEFA Nations League Finals
Cristiano Ronaldo	Portugal	221	8 June 2025	Munich	Spain	2–2	2025 UEFA Nations League Finals
Cristiano Ronaldo	Portugal	222	6 September 2025	Yerevan	Armenia	0–5	2026 FIFA World Cup qualification
Cristiano Ronaldo	Portugal	223	9 September 2025	Budapest	Hungary	2–3	2026 FIFA World Cup qualification
Cristiano Ronaldo	Portugal	224	11 October 2025	Lisbon	Republic of Ireland	1–0	2026 FIFA World Cup qualification
Cristiano Ronaldo	Portugal	225	14 October 2025	Lisbon	Hungary	2–2	2026 FIFA World Cup qualification
Cristiano Ronaldo	Portugal	226	13 November 2025	Dublin	Republic of Ireland	2–0	2026 FIFA World Cup qualification
Cristiano Ronaldo	Portugal	227	6 June 2026	Oeiras	Chile	2–1	Friendly match
Cristiano Ronaldo	Portugal	228	10 June 2026	Leiria	Nigeria	2–1	Friendly match
Cristiano Ronaldo	Portugal	229	17 June 2026	Houston	DR Congo	1–1	2026 FIFA World Cup
Cristiano Ronaldo	Portugal	230	23 June 2026	Houston	Uzbekistan	5–0	2026 FIFA World Cup
Cristiano Ronaldo	Portugal	231	27 June 2026	Miami Gardens	Colombia	0–0	2026 FIFA World Cup
Cristiano Ronaldo	Portugal	232	2 July 2026	Toronto	Croatia	2–1	2026 FIFA World Cup
Cristiano Ronaldo	Portugal	233	6 July 2026	Dallas	Spain	0–1	2026 FIFA World Cup
Cristiano Ronaldo	Portugal	234	24 September 2026	Lisbon	Wales	1–0	2026–27 UEFA Nations League

== See also ==
- Progression of association football caps South American record
- List of women's footballers with 100 or more international caps
- List of men's footballers with 100 or more international caps
- Progression of association football caps European record
- Progression of association football caps Oceania record
- List of world association football records
