= 1980 Merdeka Tournament =

Tournament details
- Host country: Malaysia
- Teams: 8 (from 2 confederations)
- Venue(s): 1 (in 1 host city)

Final positions
- Champions: Morocco (1st title)
- Runners-up: Malaysia
- Third place: South Korea
- Fourth place: Thailand

Tournament statistics
- Matches played: 29
- Goals scored: 73 (2.52 per match)

The 1980 Merdeka Tournament was held from 15 October to 2 November 1980 in Malaysia.

== Group stage ==
One Group Stage

| Team | Pld | W | D | L | GF | GA | GD | Pts |
|---|---|---|---|---|---|---|---|---|
| Malaysia | 7 | 4 | 3 | 0 | 13 | 7 | +6 | 11 |
| Morocco | 7 | 4 | 2 | 1 | 13 | 6 | +7 | 10 |
| South Korea | 7 | 2 | 4 | 1 | 8 | 5 | +3 | 8 |
| Thailand | 7 | 2 | 4 | 1 | 8 | 7 | +1 | 8 |
| New Zealand | 7 | 2 | 3 | 2 | 9 | 9 | 0 | 7 |
| (Myanmar) Burma | 7 | 1 | 3 | 3 | 9 | 12 | -3 | 5 |
| Indonesia | 7 | 1 | 3 | 3 | 4 | 7 | -3 | 5 |
| Kuwait | 7 | 1 | 0 | 6 | 6 | 17 | -11 | 2 |

15 October 1980

| Morocco | 2 – 2 | (Myanmar) Burma |

Merdeka Stadium, Kuala Lumpur

16 October 1980

| South Korea | 1 – 0 | Indonesia |

Merdeka Stadium, Kuala Lumpur
16 October 1980

| Kuwait | 0 – 1 | Thailand |

Merdeka Stadium, Kuala Lumpur
16 October 1980

| Kuwait | 1 – 5 | New Zealand |

Merdeka Stadium, Kuala Lumpur

17 October 1980

| Malaysia | 3 – 2 | (Myanmar) Burma |

Merdeka Stadium, Kuala Lumpur

18 October 1980

| South Korea | 3 – 0 | Kuwait |

Merdeka Stadium, Kuala Lumpur
18 October 1980

| Indonesia | 1 – 1 | Thailand |

Merdeka Stadium, Kuala Lumpur

19 October 1980

| South Korea | 1 – 2 | New Zealand |

Merdeka Stadium, Kuala Lumpur

20 October 1980

| Malaysia | 2 – 2 | Thailand |

Merdeka Stadium, Kuala Lumpur
20 October 1980

| South Korea | 1 – 1 | Morocco |

Merdeka Stadium, Kuala Lumpur

21 October 1980

| New Zealand | 0 – 0 | Indonesia |

Merdeka Stadium, Kuala Lumpur

22 October 1980

| Malaysia | 1 – 1 | South Korea |

Merdeka Stadium, Kuala Lumpur
22 October 1980

| Thailand | 1 – 2 | Morocco |

Merdeka Stadium, Kuala Lumpur

23 October 1980

| Kuwait | 3 – 1 | (Myanmar) Burma |

Merdeka Stadium, Kuala Lumpur

24 October 1980

| Burma (Myanmar) | 1 – 1 | New Zealand |

Merdeka Stadium, Kuala Lumpur
24 October 1980

| Malaysia | 2 – 0 | Morocco |

Merdeka Stadium, Kuala Lumpur
24 October 1980

| South Korea | 0 – 0 | Thailand |

Merdeka Stadium, Kuala Lumpur

25 October 1980

| Kuwait | 1 – 2 | Indonesia |

Merdeka Stadium, Kuala Lumpur

26 October 1980

| New Zealand | 0 – 3 | Morocco |

Merdeka Stadium, Kuala Lumpur

27 October 1980

| Malaysia | 1 – 1 | Indonesia |

Merdeka Stadium, Kuala Lumpur
27 October 1980

| Kuwait | 0 – 3 | Morocco |

Merdeka Stadium, Kuala Lumpur

28 October 1980

| New Zealand | 1 – 1 | Thailand |

Merdeka Stadium, Kuala Lumpur
28 October 1980

| Burma (Myanmar) | 1 – 2 | Thailand |

Merdeka Stadium, Kuala Lumpur

29 October 1980

| Malaysia | 2 – 1 | Kuwait |

Merdeka Stadium, Kuala Lumpur
29 October 1980

| Indonesia | 0 – 2 | Morocco |

Merdeka Stadium, Kuala Lumpur

30 October 1980

| Malaysia | 2 – 0 | New Zealand |

Merdeka Stadium, Kuala Lumpur
30 October 1980

| Burma (Myanmar) | 1 – 1 | South Korea |

Merdeka Stadium, Kuala Lumpur

31 October 1980

| Burma (Myanmar) | 1 – 0 | Indonesia |

Merdeka Stadium, Kuala Lumpur

=== Final match ===
2 November 1980

| Malaysia | 1 – 2 | Morocco |
|---|---|---|
| Soh Chin Aun | Report | Khourrag Hamid; Labid Khalifa |

Merdeka Stadium, Kuala Lumpur
