= List of association football rivalries =

This list of association football rivalries catalogues football rivalries around the world. This includes rivalries at the club and international level, including local derby and intercontinental competitions.

== International ==
This list uses the geographic confederation classifications issues by International Association Football Federation (FIFA): CAF (Africa), AFC (Asia and Australia), UEFA (Europe), CONCACAF (North & Central America and the Caribbean), OFC (Oceania) and CONMEBOL (South America).

=== Intercontinental ===
Country 1	Country 2	Article	World Cup games (as of 2026)	Ref
Argentina	England	Argentina–England	6 (2026)	
Argentina	Mexico	Argentina–Mexico	4 (2022)	
Argentina	Netherlands	Argentina–Netherlands	6 (2022)	
Australia	New Zealand	Australia–New Zealand	—	
Australia	Uruguay	Australia–Uruguay	—	
Brazil	Italy	Brazil–Italy	5 (1994)	
Japan (women)	United States (women)	Japan–United States	4 (2015)	

=== Asia and Australia (AFC) ===
Country 1	Country 2	Article	World Cup games (as of 2026)	Ref
Afghanistan	Pakistan	Afghanistan–Pakistan	—	
Australia	Indonesia	Australia–Indonesia	—	
Australia	Japan	Australia–Japan	1	
Australia	South Korea	Australia–South Korea	—	
China	Hong Kong	China–Hong Kong	—	
China	Japan	China–Japan	—	
China	South Korea	China–South Korea	—	
Hong Kong	Macau	Hong Kong–Macau	—	
India	Pakistan	India–Pakistan	—	
India	Bangladesh	South Asian Clásico	—	
Indonesia	Malaysia	Indonesia–Malaysia	—	
Indonesia	Singapore	Indonesia–Singapore	—	
Indonesia	Vietnam	Indonesia–Vietnam	—	
Iran	Iraq	Iran–Iraq	—	
Iran	Saudi Arabia	Iran–Saudi Arabia	—	
Iraq	Kuwait	Iraq–Kuwait	—	
Iraq	Saudi Arabia	Iraq–Saudi Arabia	—	
Japan	South Korea	Japan–South Korea	—	
North Korea	South Korea	North Korea–South Korea	—	
Qatar	United Arab Emirates	Qatar–UAE	—	
Thailand	Vietnam	Thailand–Vietnam	—	

=== Africa (CAF) ===
Country 1	Country 2	Article	World Cup games (as of 2026)	Source
Algeria	Egypt	Algeria–Egypt	—	
Algeria	Morocco	Algeria–Morocco	—	
Algeria	Tunisia	Algeria–Tunisia	—	
Egypt	Tunisia	Egypt–Tunisia	—	
Ghana	Nigeria	Ghana–Nigeria	—	

=== Europe (UEFA) ===
Country 1	Country 2	Article	World Cup games (as of 2026)	Ref
Albania	Kosovo	Albania–Kosovo	—	
Albania	Serbia	Albania–Serbia	—	
Austria	Hungary	Austria–Hungary	1	
Belgium	Netherlands	Belgium–Netherlands	2	
Croatia	Serbia	Croatia–Serbia	2	
Czech Republic	Slovakia	Czech Republic–Slovakia	—	
Denmark	Sweden	Denmark–Sweden	—	
England	Germany	England–Germany	5	
England	Republic of Ireland	England–Republic of Ireland	1	
England	Scotland	England–Scotland	—	
France	Germany	France–Germany	4	
France	Italy	France–Italy	5	
France	Spain	France–Spain	1	
Germany	Netherlands	Germany–Netherlands	4	
Germany	Italy	Germany–Italy	5	
Hungary	Romania	Hungary–Romania	—	
Hungary	Poland	Hungary–Poland	—	
Italy	Spain	Italy–Spain	3	
Northern Ireland	Republic of Ireland	Irish derby	—	
Poland	Russia	Poland–Russia	1	
Portugal	Spain	Portugal–Spain	2	

=== North & Central America and the Caribbean (CONCACAF) ===
Country 1	Country 2	Article	World Cup games (as of 2026)	Ref
Honduras	Costa Rica	Clásico centroamericano	—	
Honduras	El Salvador	El Salvador–Honduras	—	
United States	Mexico	Mexico–United States	1	
United States	Canada	Canada–United States	—	

=== South America (CONMEBOL) ===
Country 1	Country 2	Article	World Cup games (as of 2026)	Ref
Argentina	Brazil	Argentina–Brazil	4	
Argentina	Uruguay	Argentina–Uruguay	2	
Brazil	Uruguay	Brazil–Uruguay	2	
Chile	Peru	Chile–Peru	—	
Ecuador	Peru	Ecuador–Peru	—	

== See also ==
- List of association football competitions
- Association football culture
- List of sports rivalries
