= Australia–Japan football rivalry =

International football rivalry

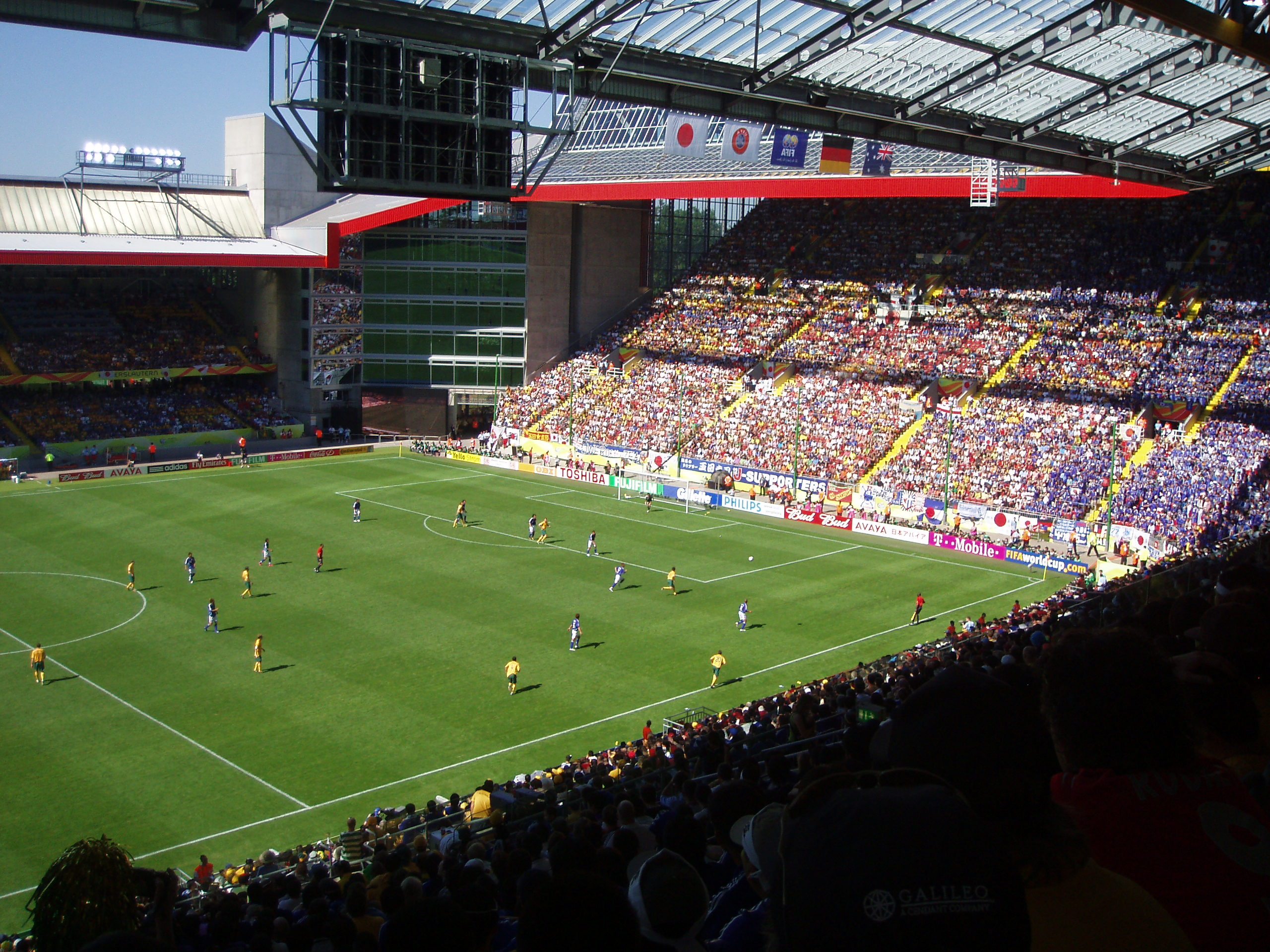
- Australia played against Japan at the 2006 FIFA World Cup
- Other names: Socceroos vs Samurai Blue
- Location: Asia (AFC)
- Teams: Australia; Japan
- First meeting: 27 November 1956; Summer Olympics; Australia 2–0 Japan
- Latest meeting: 5 June 2025; 2026 FIFA World Cup qualification Australia 1–0 Japan

Statistics
- Total meetings: 29
- Most wins: Japan (11)
- All-time series: Australia: 8 Drawn: 10; Japan: 11

The Australia–Japan football rivalry is a sports rivalry that exists between the national association football teams of each country, regarded as one of Asia's biggest football rivalries. The rivalry is a relatively recent one, born from several highly competitive matches between the two teams since Australia joined the Asian Football Confederation in 2006. The two teams have played each other in several significant matches, including a World Cup group stage match, the 2011 Asian Cup final and have been drawn in the same group in five consecutive World Cup qualification campaigns.

== Origins ==
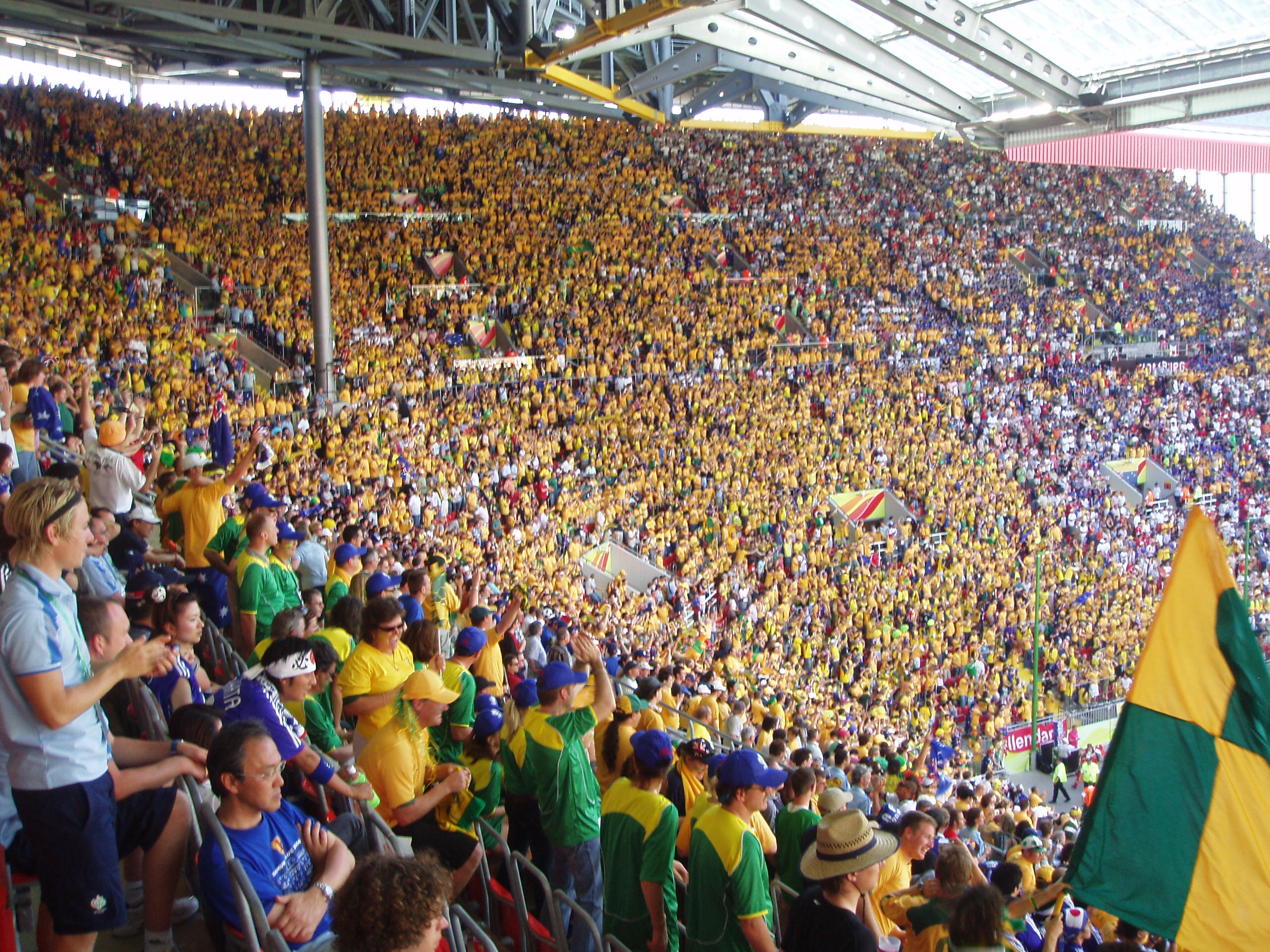
Socceroos supporters at a Japan match in Kaiserslautern

The first match between the two teams was played at the 1956 Olympics, ending in a 2–0 win for the Australians. Another dozen matches were played between Australia and Japan until a semi-final match at the 2001 Confederations Cup which ended in a 1–0 for Japan, but the match-up only emerged as a rivalry after 2006, when Australia joined the AFC, especially the FIFA World Cup qualification games. The first match between the two sides after this was during the 2006 FIFA World Cup, a group stage game where Australia was still technically competing as Oceania representatives. With just six minutes left, Japan led by a single goal, only for Australia to score thrice in succession to secure their first-ever win in a World Cup finals match in what is regarded as one of the greatest moments in Australian sporting history.

Several fierce qualifying matches over the next few years enhanced the rivalry, and Japan got revenge for their World Cup defeat by knocking the Socceroos out of the 2007 AFC Asian Cup at the quarter-finals on penalties. In 2011, Japan again beat the Socceroos in an Asian Cup, this time in the final with a solitary goal in extra time sealing the title.

== Men's matches ==
No.	Date	Competition	Home team	Score	Away team	Venue
1	27 November 1956	1956 Olympic Games	Australia	2–0	Japan	(Australia) Olympic Park, Melbourne
2	30 March 1968	International friendly	Australia	2–2	Japan	(Australia) Sydney Showground, Sydney
3	31 March 1968	International friendly	Australia	3–1	Japan	(Australia) Olympic Park, Melbourne
4	4 April 1968	International friendly	Australia	1–3	Japan	(Australia) Hindmarsh Stadium, Adelaide
5	10 October 1969	1970 World Cup qualification	Japan	1–3	Australia	(South Korea) Dongdaemun Stadium, Seoul
6	16 October 1969	1970 World Cup qualification	Japan	1–1	Australia	(South Korea) Dongdaemun Stadium, Seoul
7	22 May 1994	Kirin Cup	Japan	1–1	Australia	(Japan) Big Arch Stadium, Hiroshima
8	29 September 1994	International Friendly	Japan	0–0	Australia	(Japan) National Stadium, Tokyo
9	15 February 1995	International Friendly	Australia	2–1	Japan	(Australia) Sydney Football Stadium, Sydney
10	10 February 1996	International Friendly	Australia	1–4	Japan	(Australia) Brandon Park, Wollongong
11	14 February 1996	International Friendly	Australia	3–0	Japan	(Australia) Lakeside Stadium, Melbourne
12	15 February 1998	International Friendly	Australia	0–3	Japan	(Australia) Hindmarsh Stadium, Adelaide
13	8 June 2001	2001 Confederations Cup	Japan	1–0	Australia	(Japan) International Stadium, Yokohama
14	15 August 2001	2001 AFC–OFC Challenge Cup	Japan	3–0	Australia	(Japan) Shizuoka Stadium, Shizuoka
15	12 June 2006	2006 World Cup	Australia	3–1	Japan	(Germany) Fritz-Walter-Stadion, Kaiserslautern
16	21 July 2007	2007 Asian Cup	Japan	1–1 (a.e.t.) (4–3 p)	Australia	(Vietnam) Mỹ Đình National Stadium, Hanoi
17	11 February 2009	2010 World Cup qualification	Japan	0–0	Australia	(Japan) International Stadium, Yokohama
18	17 June 2009	2010 World Cup qualification	Australia	2–1	Japan	(Australia) Melbourne Cricket Ground, Melbourne
19	29 January 2011	2011 Asian Cup	Australia	0–1 (a.e.t.)	Japan	(Qatar) Khalifa International Stadium, Doha
20	12 June 2012	2014 World Cup qualification	Australia	1–1	Japan	(Australia) Brisbane Stadium, Brisbane
21	4 June 2013	2014 World Cup qualification	Japan	1–1	Australia	(Japan) Saitama Stadium 2002, Saitama
22	25 July 2013	2013 East Asian Cup	Japan	3–2	Australia	(South Korea) Hwaseong Stadium, Hwaseong
23	18 November 2014	International Friendly	Japan	2–1	Australia	(Japan) Nagai Stadium, Osaka
24	11 October 2016	2018 World Cup qualification	Australia	1–1	Japan	(Australia) Docklands Stadium, Melbourne
25	31 August 2017	2018 World Cup qualification	Japan	2–0	Australia	(Japan) Saitama Stadium 2002, Saitama
26	12 October 2021	2022 World Cup qualification	Japan	2–1	Australia	(Japan) Saitama Stadium 2002, Saitama
27	24 March 2022	2022 World Cup qualification	Australia	0–2	Japan	Stadium Australia, Sydney
28	15 October 2024	2026 World Cup qualification	Japan	1–1	Australia	(Japan) Saitama Stadium 2002, Saitama
29	5 June 2025	2026 World Cup qualification	Australia	1–0	Japan	(Australia) Perth Stadium, Perth

== Women's matches ==
Like their men's counterparts, the two nations also have a strong rivalry in the women's game, with both Australia and Japan among Asia's highest ranked nations. Although the first matches started in the 1980s, the two have met regularly in both friendly and competitive matches, in particular having competed often in the AFC Women's Asian Cup and having met in three Asian Cup finals.

Since Australia joined Asian Football Confederation in 2006, both Matildas and Nadeshiko became two of the only three Asian nations to finish in the top four of the FIFA Women's World Cup (Japan crowned champions in 2011 and runners-up in 2015 while Australia finish fourth in the 2023 edition).

No.	Date	Competition	Home team	Score	Away team	Venue
1	22 October 1984	Xi'an Women's Tournament	Australia	6–2	Japan	(China) Xi'an
2	8 December 1984	World Invitational	Australia	2–2	Japan	(Taiwan) Taipei
3	4 December 1989	Prima Cup	Japan	2–2	Australia	(Japan) Kanagawa
4	5 December 1989	Prima Cup	Japan	1–1	Australia	(Japan) Kanagawa
5	27 September 1994	Friendly	Japan	2–2	Australia	(Japan) Tokyo
6	9 July 1996	Friendly	Japan	2–2	Australia	(United States) Fort Lauderdale
7	31 May 2000	Pacific Cup	Australia	1–0	Japan	(Australia) Bruce Stadium, Canberra
8	6 April 2002	Tournoi International de France	Australia	1–1	Japan	(France) Stade Lebon, Angoulême
9	27 July 2003	Three Nations Tournament	Japan	0–0	Australia	(Japan) Yurtec Stadium Sendai, Sendai
10	26 March 2005	Two Match Friendly Series	Australia	0–2	Japan	(Australia) Sydney Olympic Stadium, Sydney
11	29 March 2005	Two Match Friendly Series	Australia	2–1	Japan	(Australia) Seymour Shaw Park, Sydney
12	23 July 2005	Friendly	Japan	4–2	Australia	(Japan) Tokyo
13	27 July 2006	2006 AFC Women's Asian Cup	Australia	2–0	Japan	(Australia) Hindmarsh Stadium, Adelaide
14	19 November 2006	Friendly	Japan	1–0	Australia	(Japan) Tokyo
15	2 June 2008	2008 AFC Women's Asian Cup	Australia	1–3	Japan	(Vietnam) Thống Nhất Stadium, Hồ Chí Minh City
16	8 June 2008	2008 AFC Women's Asian Cup	Australia	0–3	Japan	(Vietnam) Thống Nhất Stadium, Hồ Chí Minh City
17	24 July 2008	Friendly	Japan	3–0	Australia	(Japan) Kobe
18	27 May 2010	2010 AFC Women's Asian Cup	Japan	0–1	Australia	(China) Chengdu Sports Centre. Chengdu
19	5 September 2011	2012 Summer Olympics qualification	Japan	1–0	Australia	(China) Shandong Provincial Stadium, Jinan
20	11 July 2012	Friendly	Japan	3–0	Australia	(Japan) National Stadium (Tokyo), Tokyo
21	14 May 2014	2014 AFC Women's Asian Cup	Australia	2–2	Japan	(Vietnam) Thống Nhất Stadium, Hồ Chí Minh City
22	25 May 2014	2014 AFC Women's Asian Cup	Japan	1–0	Australia	(Vietnam) Thống Nhất Stadium, Hồ Chí Minh City
23	27 June 2015	2015 FIFA Women's World Cup	Australia	0–1	Japan	(Canada) Commonwealth Stadium, Edmonton
24	29 February 2016	2016 AFC Women's Olympic Qualifying Tournament	Australia	3–1	Japan	(Japan) Yodoko Sakura Stadium, Osaka
25	30 July 2017	2017 Tournament of Nations	Japan	2–4	Australia	(United States) San Diego Stadium, San Diego
26	13 April 2018	2018 AFC Women's Asian Cup	Japan	1–1	Australia	(Jordan) Amman International Stadium, Amman
27	20 April 2018	2018 AFC Women's Asian Cup	Japan	1–0	Australia	(Jordan) Amman International Stadium, Amman
28	2 August 2018	2018 Tournament of Nations	Australia	2–0	Japan	(United States) SeatGeek Stadium, Bridgeview
29	14 July 2021	Friendly	Japan	1–0	Australia	(Japan) Sanga Stadium by Kyocera, Kameoka
30	20 February 2025	SheBelieves Cup	Japan	4–0	Australia	(United States) Shell Energy Stadium, Houston
31	21 March 2026	2026 AFC Women's Asian Cup	Japan	1–0	Australia	Stadium Australia, Sydney

== Overall ==
=== Men ===
As of 5 June 2025

Team	GP	W	D	L	GF	GA	GD
Australia	29	8	10	11	34	40	–6
Japan	29	11	10	8	40	34	+6

=== Women ===
As of 21 March 2026

Team	GP	W	D	L	GF	GA	GD
Australia	31	8	9	14	37	48	–11
Japan	31	14	9	8	48	37	+11

== Top scorers ==
As of 5 June 2025

Players in bold are still available for selection.

Rank	Player	Goals
1	(Australia) Tim Cahill	5
2	(Japan) Kunishige Kamamoto	4
3	(Australia) Tommy McColl	3
6	(Australia) John Aloisi	2
6	(Australia) Ray Baartz	2
6	(Japan) Takashi Hirano	2
6	(Japan) Hidetoshi Nakata	2
6	(Japan) **Kaoru Mitoma**	2
6	(Japan) Takuya Takagi	2
6	(Japan) **Yuya Osako**	2

== See also ==
- Australia–New Zealand soccer rivalry
- Australia–South Korea football rivalry
- Australia–Uruguay football rivalry
- Japan–South Korea football rivalry
