= Australia–Uruguay football rivalry =

International football rivalry

Australia–Uruguay association football rivalry
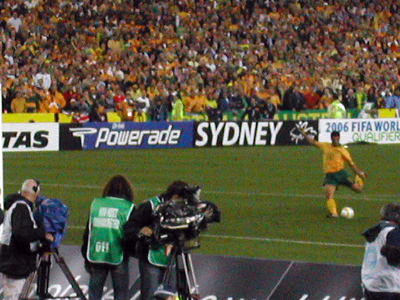
- John Aloisi taking the penalty that secured the victory over Uruguay and Australia's place in the 2006 World Cup
- Other names: Clásico del Repechaje Intercontinental (Intercontinental Play-Off Derby)
- Location: Australia (AFC); Uruguay (CONMEBOL)
- Teams: Australia men's Uruguay men's
- First meeting: Men: Australia 0-0 Uruguay (24 April 1974)
- Latest meeting: Men: Australia 1–2 Uruguay (1 June 2007)

Statistics
- Total meetings: Men: 9
- All-time series: Men: Australia: 4 Uruguay: 4 Draws: 1
- Largest victory: Men: Uruguay 3–0 Australia (25 November 2001)

The Australia–Uruguay association football rivalry is a historical rivalry between the Australian and Uruguayan national teams that dates back to 1974 when Uruguay travelled to Australia for a 2-game series before Australia departed for the 1974 FIFA World Cup. Despite Australia performing well in both matches, they were marred with foul play by the Uruguayans, which left Australian forward Ray Baartz suffering a stroke after having his carotid artery damaged following an incident with Luis Garisto. The incident caused Baartz to miss the World Cup and retire from the game for health concerns. Between 2001 and 2005 the rivalry would come to the forefront of Australian and Uruguayan relations as both nations played each other in consecutive FIFA World Cup play-off matches. Uruguay would win the 2001 play-offs for the 2002 FIFA World Cup, whilst Australia would win the 2005 play offs for the 2006 FIFA World Cup, which has been called the best moment in Australian sporting history as Australia qualified for the World Cup finals for the first time in 32 years. To date, the two nations' women's national teams are yet to play each other.

== History ==
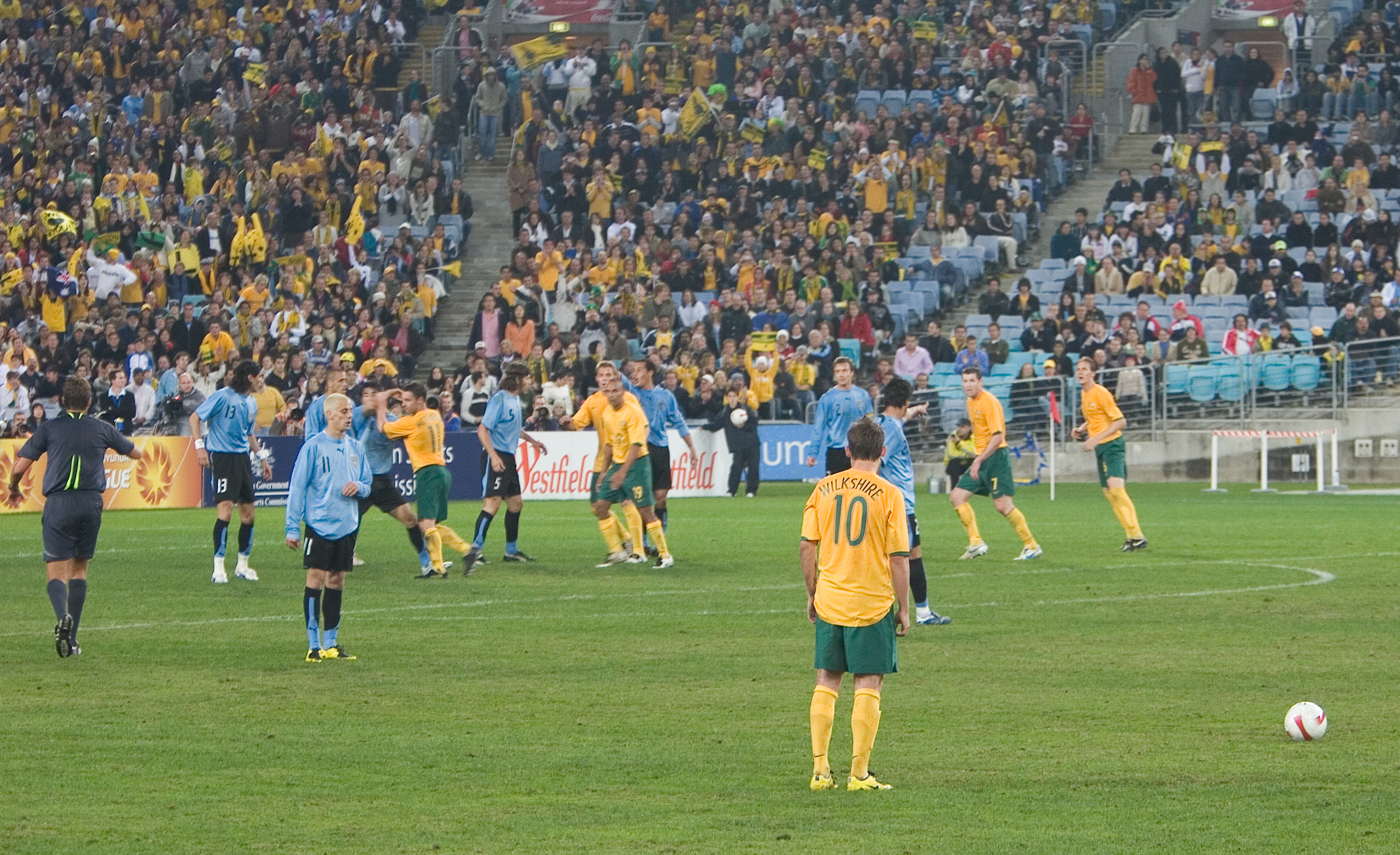
Luke Wilkshire preparing to take a free kick during the 2007 friendly

=== Men's ===
Both Australia and Uruguay had qualified for the 1974 FIFA World Cup in West Germany. For Australia, it would be their first ever qualification. Uruguay travelled to Australia for a pre-tournament 2-game series at Olympic Park in Melbourne and the Sydney Sports Ground in Sydney. The match in Melbourne ended in a 0–0 draw which was noted for the aggressively physical play by the Uruguayans with Australian manager Rale Rasic referring to the Uruguayans' antics as "dirty". The following match in Sydney in front of a crowd of 27,500 would be marred with physicality not experienced by Australian footballers to this point. During the first half of the game with the scores locked at 0–0 Uruguayan player Luis Garisto felled Australian striker Ray Baartz with what was described as a karate chop to Barrtz's neck which Garisto went unpunished for. Following a few minutes of treatment Baartz resumed play. After scoring the first and providing the assist for Australia's second goal, Uruguays play would become more violent and spiteful, culminating in Garisto punching Baartz in the jaw following some banter. To make it look like Baartz had attacked Garisto, a fellow Uruguayan player punched Garisto in the face which drew blood. The referee threatened to abandon the game, however Australia held on for a 2–0 victory. Following the match, Baartz started showing signs of a stroke following the attack to his neck and was rushed to Royal North Shore Hospital where doctors placed in him in intensive care having lost consciousness for two days. Whilst Baartz would survive the stroke and return to full health, due to the severe extend of his injuries he would retire from all forms of the game at just 27 years old following doctors advice that another severe blow to his neck may kill him.

It would be 18 years before the two nations would meet again when Australia played a 3-game 'goodwill tour' of South America. Uruguay would win 2–1 in front of 18,000 strong crowd in Montevideo

Australia and Uruguay would meet for a fourth time during the semi finals of the 1997 Confederations Cup in Saudi Arabia. With the scores locked at 0–0 at full time, the match went to golden goal. Two minutes into the golden goal period, young Australian striker Harry Kewell scored the winning goal with a shot from 25 meters, propelling Australia into the final against Brazil.

==== 2002 FIFA World Cup qualification (OFC–CONMEBOL play-off) ====
The 2002 FIFA World Cup OFC–CONMEBOL qualification play-off was a two-legged home-and-away tie between the winners of the Oceania qualifying tournament, Australia, and the fifth-placed team from the South American qualifying tournament, Uruguay. The games were played on 20 November and 25 November 2001 in Melbourne and Montevideo respectively. Australia was hoping to play in the FIFA World Cup for the first time since 1974 and Uruguay since 1990.

The first leg was held at the MCG in Melbourne and finished with Australia defeating Uruguay 1–0, courtesy of a second half penalty converted by Kevin Muscat.

The return leg in Uruguay was marred with controversy from the moment Australia landed in the country. A lynch mob which had been organized by a private citizens, confronted the Australian national team as they made their way from the airport terminal to their bus. The mob spat, assaulted, and abused the players and coaching staff with death threats resulting in the Australians being kept in their hotel rooms for the 3-days prior to the match. The antics which were believed to have unsettled Australia ahead of the game worked, as Australia crashed to a 3–0 defeat. Goals from Darío Silva, and a brace from Richard Morales sealed a 3–1 aggregate victory and ultimately qualification for the 2002 FIFA World Cup for the South Americans.

==== 2006 FIFA World Cup qualification (CONMEBOL–OFC play-off) ====
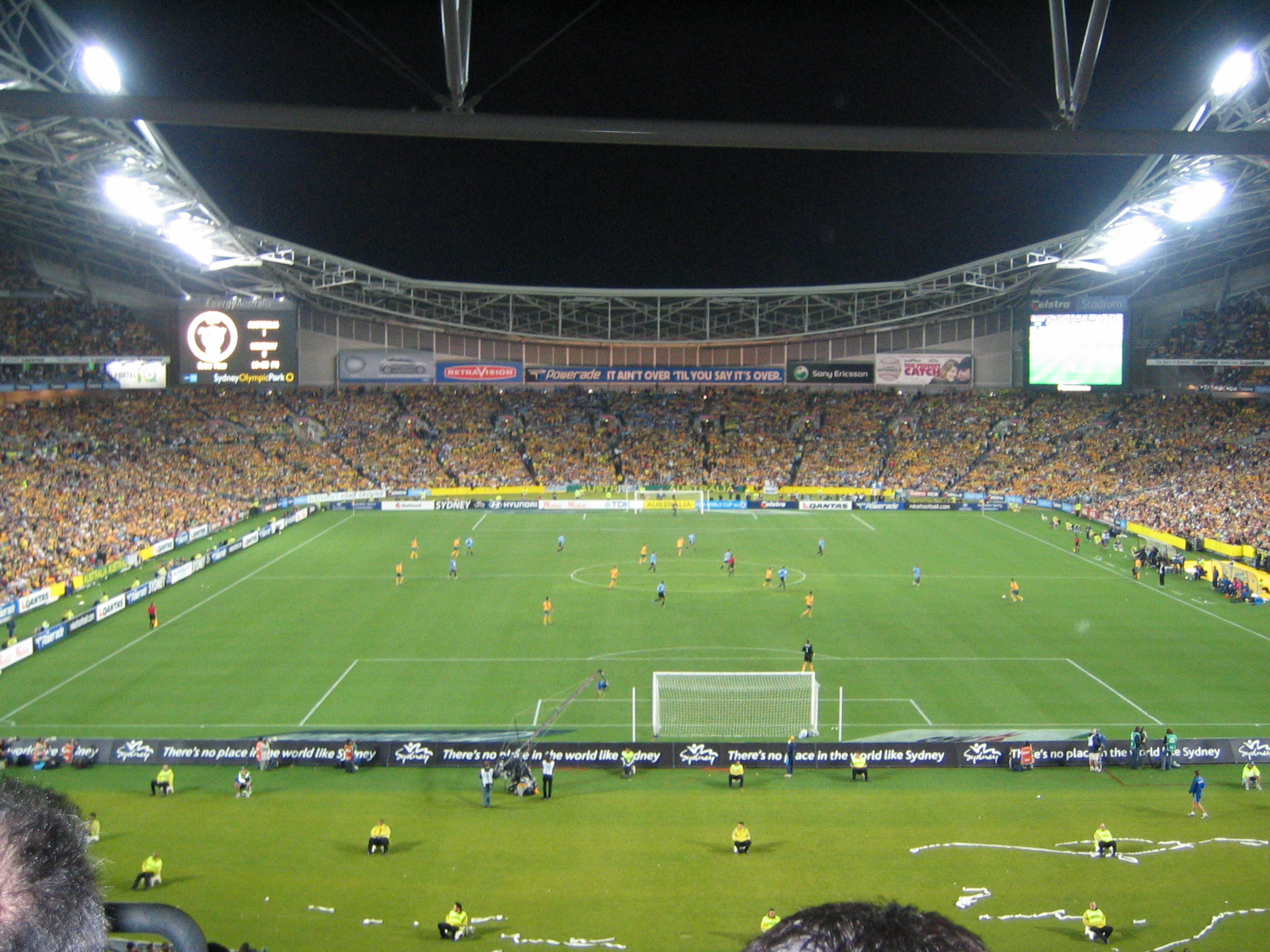
Australia v Uruguay 2005 World Cup qualifier at Stadium Australia

The two nations would meet again in consecutive World Cup Qualification play-offs in 2005 for the 2006 FIFA World Cup. The first leg was held in Montevideo with security bolstered for the Australian team following the incidents during the 2002 playoff. Uruguay won the first leg 1–0, courtesy of a goal from Darío Rodríguez in the 37th minute Australia, led by Dutch coach Guus Hiddink had learned their lesson from the previous World Cup cycle, not being baited even when Uruguayan legend Álvaro Recoba claimed Uruguay had a "divine right" to play in the World Cup. Following the loss, the Australian team flew to the second leg in Sydney on a chartered Qantas flight which had been modified so that the Australian players could recover from the first leg in-flight, whereas the Uruguay team were forced to endure a multi-leg commercial flights.

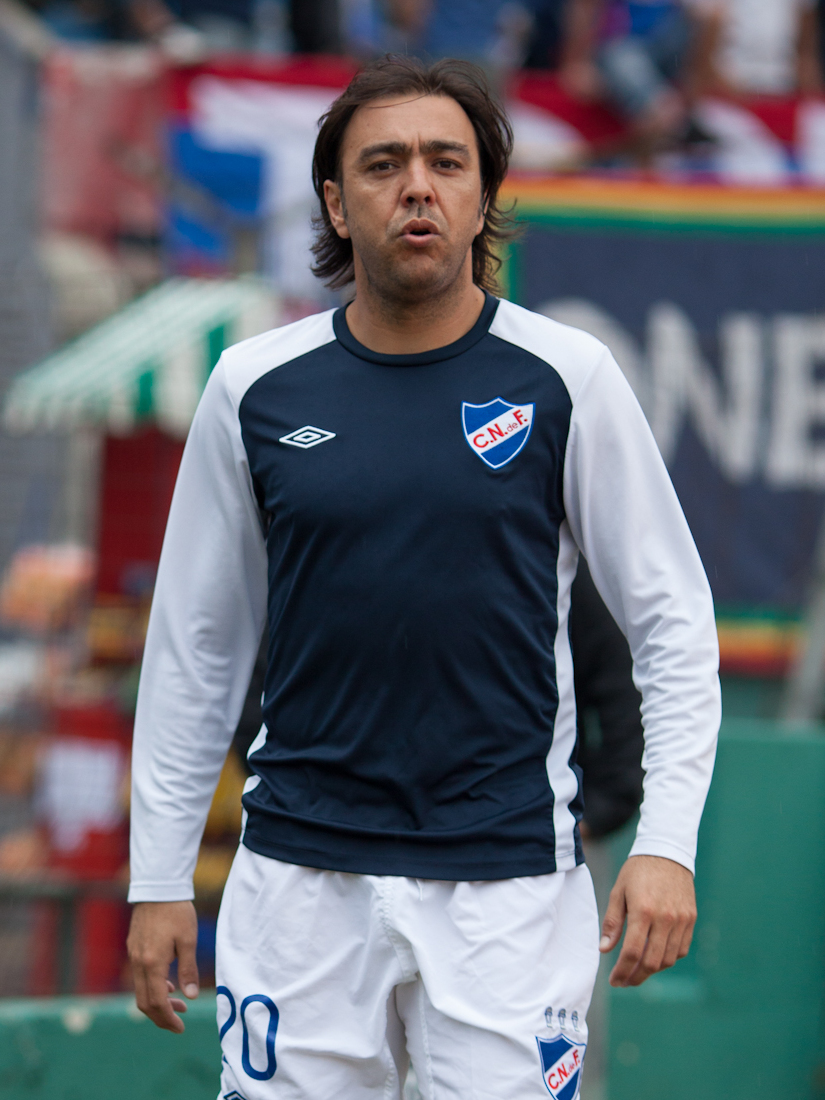
Recoba created controversy ahead of the World Cup qualifiers by saying Uruguay had a divine right to qualify

The second leg match at Stadium Australia in Sydney was a tight affair, with Mark Bresciano scoring the game's only goal after 90 minutes, sending the match into Extra Time with the scores locked at 1–1 on aggregate. The match would go to penalties, with Australian goalkeeper Mark Schwarzer saving two penalties. John Aloisi scored the winning penalty to send Australia through to the World Cup for the first time in 32 years.

In 2019, CONMEBOL invited Australia to compete in the 2020 Copa América. The Socceroos were drawn in the south zone of the tournament, and were to play Uruguay along with Chile, Argentina, Paraguay and Bolivia. The COVID-19 pandemic forced CONMEBOL to delay the tournament to 2021, with Australia withdrawing its wildcard berth due to scheduling conflicts with its 2022 World Cup qualification campaign.

== Men's Matches ==
As of 1 April 2024

Australia and Uruguay have played 9 official matches. Both nations have won 4 matches a piece, with one draw. Uruguay holds the record of the biggest win, during their 3–0 victory in 2001. Australia has scored 6 goals, whilst Uruguay have scored 8 goals.

Australia wins
Uruguay wins
Draws

Competition	Date	Home team	Result	Away team	Home scorers	Away scorers	Venue	Attendance
Friendly	24 April 1974	Australia	0–0	Uruguay			Olympic Park, Melbourne, Australia	20,283
Friendly	27 April 1974	Australia	2–0	Uruguay	Baartz 59' Ollerton 85'		Sydney Cricket Ground, Sydney, Australia	25,708
Friendly	21 June 1992	Uruguay	2–0	Australia	Martínez 63' Larrea 84'		Montevideo, Uruguay	18,000
1997 FIFA Confederations Cup	19 December 1997	Uruguay	0–1	Australia		Kewell 92'	King Fahd II Stadium, Riyadh	22,000
2002 FIFA World Cup qualification (OFC–CONMEBOL play-off)	20 November 2001	Australia	1–0	Uruguay	Muscat 79' (pen.)		MCG, Melbourne	84,656
2002 FIFA World Cup qualification (OFC–CONMEBOL play-off)	25 November 2001	Uruguay	3–0	Australia	Silva 14' Morales 70', 90'		Estadio Centenario, Montevideo	62,000
2006 FIFA World Cup qualification (CONMEBOL–OFC play-off)	12 November 2005	Uruguay	1–0	Australia	Rodríguez 37'		Estadio Centenario, Montevideo	55,000
2006 FIFA World Cup qualification (CONMEBOL–OFC play-off)	16 November 2005	Australia	1–0 (4–2 pens)	Uruguay	Bresciano 35'		Stadium Australia, Sydney	82,698
Friendly	1 June 2007	Australia	1–2	Uruguay	Sterjovski 6'	Forlán 40' Recoba 77'	Stadium Australia, Sydney	61,725
~~2020 Copa América~~	~~13 June 2020~~	~~Australia~~	cancelled	~~Uruguay~~			~~Estadio Mario Alberto Kempes, Córdoba~~	

== Overall summary ==
As of 1 April 2024

Men's Team	GP	W	D	L	GF	GA	GD
Australia	9	4	1	4	6	8	−2
Uruguay	9	4	1	4	8	6	+2

== Top scorers ==
As of 1 April 2024

Players in bold are still available for selection.

Rank	Player	Team	Goals
1	Richard Morales	Uruguay	2
2	6 goalscorers	Australia	1
	6 goalscorers	Uruguay	1

== See also ==
- Australia national soccer team
- Uruguay national football team
- Australia women's national soccer team
- Uruguay women's national football team
- Australia–Uruguay relations
- List of association football club rivalries in Asia and Oceania
- List of sports rivalries
- List of association football rivalries
- List of association football competitions
