= Egypt–Tunisia football rivalry =

International football rivalry

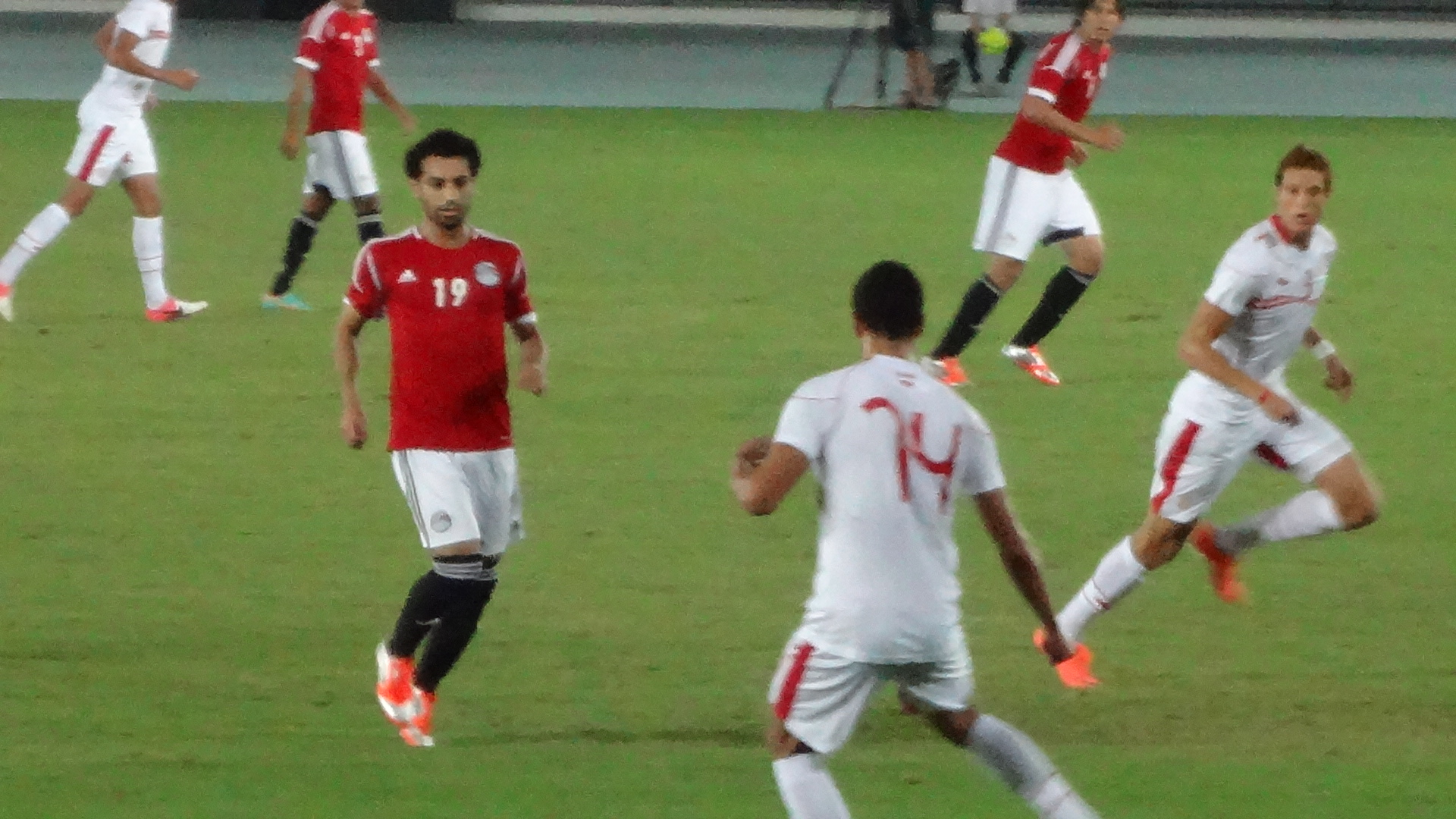
- Friendly match in 16 October 2012
- Location: CAF (Africa); UNAF (North Africa)
- Teams: Egypt; Tunisia
- First meeting: Egypt 2–1 Tunisia; Friendly; 8 December 1972
- Latest meeting: Egypt 1–3 Tunisia; Friendly; 12 September 2023

Statistics
- Most wins: Tunisia (16)
- All-time series: Matches: 35; Egypt wins: 11; Draw: 8 Tunisia wins: 16

The Egypt−Tunisia football rivalry is a football rivalry between the national football teams of Egypt and Tunisia, having achieved eight Africa Cup of Nations, one African Nations Championship and two FIFA Arab Cup between the two countries. The two nations have played 35 games against each other; Tunisia leads in wins with 16 to Egypts's 11, with the two sides drawing eight times.

== Background ==
Egypt is the first African and Arab country to participate in a FIFA World Cup in 1934, it also participated in the 1990, 2018 and 2026 editions. Tunisia has participated six times in the FIFA World Cup, the biggest men's football event in the world, in 1978, 1998, 2002, 2006, 2018, 2022 and 2026

Year	Egypt		Tunisia	
Year	Qualification	Round	Qualification	Round
(Italy) 1934	Qualified – Group 12 winner	First round	Part of France	—N/a
(Argentina) 1978	Did not qualify – Final round loser	—N/a	Qualified – Final round winner	Group stage
(Italy) 1990	Qualified – Final round winner	Group stage	Did not qualify – Final round loser	—N/a
(France) 1998	Did not qualify – Final round loser	—N/a	Qualified – Final round winner	Group stage
(South Korea) (Japan) 2002	Did not qualify – Second round winner	—N/a	Qualified – Second round winner	Group stage
(Germany) 2006	Did not qualify – Second round loser	—N/a	Qualified – Second round winner	Group stage
(Russia) 2018	Qualified – Third round winner	Group stage	Qualified – Third round winner	Group stage
(Qatar) 2022	Did not qualify – Third round loser	—N/a	Qualified – Third round winner	Group stage
(Canada) (Mexico) (United States) 2026	Qualified – CAF Group A winner	Round of 16	Qualified – CAF Group H winner	Group stage

== History ==
The matches between the Egyptian and the Tunisian teams are one of Africa's best and most exciting matches for their long continental history. The two teams have met 33 times in both official and friendly matches. Tunisian and Egyptian teams have collected 19 official matches and 14 friendly matches. The overall record is more favorable to the Tunisians as they won 15 matches and Egypt won 11 matches and ended 8 matches with a draw; however Egypt has achieved more successes in Africa than Tunisia.

The Eagles have scored 38 goals in the Pharaohs' goal, while Egypt have bundled 32 balls in Tunisia's net. The largest goal scoring match was on 11 December 1977 for the 1978 FIFA World Cup qualification after the great win of the Tunisians 4–1 which contributed in their qualification for the World Cup.

Tunisia have faced the Egyptian team 7 times in qualifying for either the World Cup or the African Nations Cup. The three World Cup qualifications were in 1974, 1978 and 1998 where Tunisia qualified in the last two editions against Egypt. The four qualifiers for the African Nations Cup were in 1978 (Tunisia won 3–2 after drawing 2–2), 1984 (0–0 draw in Tunis and the Pharaohs won in Cairo 1–0), 1992 (the teams drew 2–2 twice) and 2015 (Tunisia won 1–0 and 2–1 respectively), in addition to the current 2019 qualifiers for the fifth time, which Tunisia won the first game 1–0 in Radès and lost the second game in Alexandria 2–3.

The two teams met twice in the African Nations Cup finals in 2000 in Nigeria when Tunisia won 1–0 and in the next edition in 2002 in Mali when Egypt won with the same result. Hossam Hassan is the most of Egyptian players participating in the games of the Pharaohs against the Eagles of Carthage with 12 games, while Wahbi Khazri comes as the most of Tunisian players to participate in their matches against Egypt by 3 games.

Both Egypt and Tunisia also share a similar dubious record in the FIFA World Cup, with the Carthage Eagles being unable to progress beyond the group stage despite Tunisia qualifying for the World Cup seven times, while Egypt qualified only four times while making it to the knockout stages in 2026.

== List of matches ==
#	Date	Location	Home Team	Score	Away team	Competition	Ref
1	8 December 1972	Cairo, Egypt	Egypt	2−1	Tunisia	1974 FIFA World Cup qualification	
2	17 December 1972	Tunis, Tunisia	Tunisia	2−0	Egypt	1974 FIFA World Cup qualification	
3	15 August 1973	Tripoli, Libya	Tunisia	1−0	Egypt	Friendly	
4	27 September 1974	Damascus, Syria	Egypt	0−2	Tunisia	Friendly	
5	13 March 1977	Cairo, Egypt	Egypt	2−2	Tunisia	1978 African Cup of Nations qualification	
6	27 April 1977	Tunis, Tunisia	Tunisia	3−2	Egypt	1978 African Cup of Nations qualification	
7	25 November 1977	Cairo, Egypt	Egypt	3−2	Tunisia	1978 FIFA World Cup qualification	
8	11 December 1977	Tunis, Tunisia	Tunisia	4−1	Egypt	1978 FIFA World Cup qualification	
9	14 August 1983	Cairo, Egypt	Egypt	1−0	Tunisia	1984 African Cup of Nations qualification	
10	28 August 1983	Tunis, Tunisia	Tunisia	0−0	Egypt	1984 African Cup of Nations qualification	
11	13 July 1988	Amman, Jordan	Egypt	1−0	Tunisia	1988 Arab Cup	
12	15 March 1989	Tunis, Tunisia	Tunisia	0−0	Egypt	Friendly	
13	29 May 1989	Cairo, Egypt	Egypt	1−0	Tunisia	Friendly	
14	16 June 1989	Cairo, Egypt	Egypt	1−1	Tunisia	Friendly	
15	7 November 1989	Tunis, Tunisia	Tunisia	0−4	Egypt	Friendly	
16	14 April 1991	Tunis, Tunisia	Tunisia	2−2	Egypt	1992 African Cup of Nations qualification	
17	26 July 1991	Cairo, Egypt	Egypt	2−2	Tunisia	1992 African Cup of Nations qualification	
18	7 November 1993	Tunis, Tunisia	Tunisia	2−0	Egypt	Friendly	
19	2 January 1995	Sousse, Tunisia	Tunisia	2−0	Egypt	Friendly	
20	14 April 1995	Port Said, Egypt	Egypt	1−0	Tunisia	Friendly	
21	8 January 1996	Ismailia, Egypt	Egypt	2−1	Tunisia	Friendly	
22	12 January 1997	Tunis, Tunisia	Tunisia	1−0	Egypt	1998 FIFA World Cup qualification	
23	8 June 1997	Cairo, Egypt	Egypt	0−0	Tunisia	1998 FIFA World Cup qualification	
24	7 February 2000	Kano, Nigeria	Egypt	0−1	Tunisia	2000 African Cup of Nations	
25	25 January 2002	Bamako, Mali	Egypt	1−0	Tunisia	2002 African Cup of Nations	
26	20 November 2002	Radès, Tunisia	Tunisia	0−0	Egypt	Friendly	
27	16 November 2005	Cairo, Egypt	Egypt	1−2	Tunisia	Friendly	
28	16 October 2012	(United Arab Emirates) Abu Dhabi, UAE	Egypt	0−1	Tunisia	Friendly	
29	10 September 2014	Cairo, Egypt	Egypt	0−1	Tunisia	2015 Africa Cup of Nations qualification	
30	19 November 2014	Monastir, Tunisia	Tunisia	2−1	Egypt	2015 Africa Cup of Nations qualification	
31	8 January 2017	Cairo, Egypt	Egypt	1−0	Tunisia	Friendly	
32	11 June 2017	Radès, Tunisia	Tunisia	1−0	Egypt	2019 Africa Cup of Nations qualification	
33	16 November 2018	Alexandria, Egypt	Egypt	3−2	Tunisia	2019 Africa Cup of Nations qualification	
34	15 December 2021	Doha, Qatar	Tunisia	1−0	Egypt	2021 FIFA Arab Cup	
35	12 September 2023	Cairo, Egypt	Egypt	1−3	Tunisia	Friendly	

== Statistics ==
Summary of the confrontations between Egypt and Tunisia on 12 September 2023
Competition	Matches	Egypt Wins	Draws	Tunisia Wins	Egypt Goals	Tunisia Goals
Africa Cup of Nations	2	1	0	1	1	1
FIFA World Cup qualification	6	2	1	3	6	10
Africa Cup of Nations qualification	10	2	4	4	13	15
Arab Cup	2	1	0	1	1	1
Friendly Match	15	5	3	7	12	15
Total	35	11	8	16	33	42

== See also ==
- Egypt–Tunisia relations
