= Iran–Iraq football rivalry =

Football rivalry between Iran and Iraq

Iran–Iraq rivalry
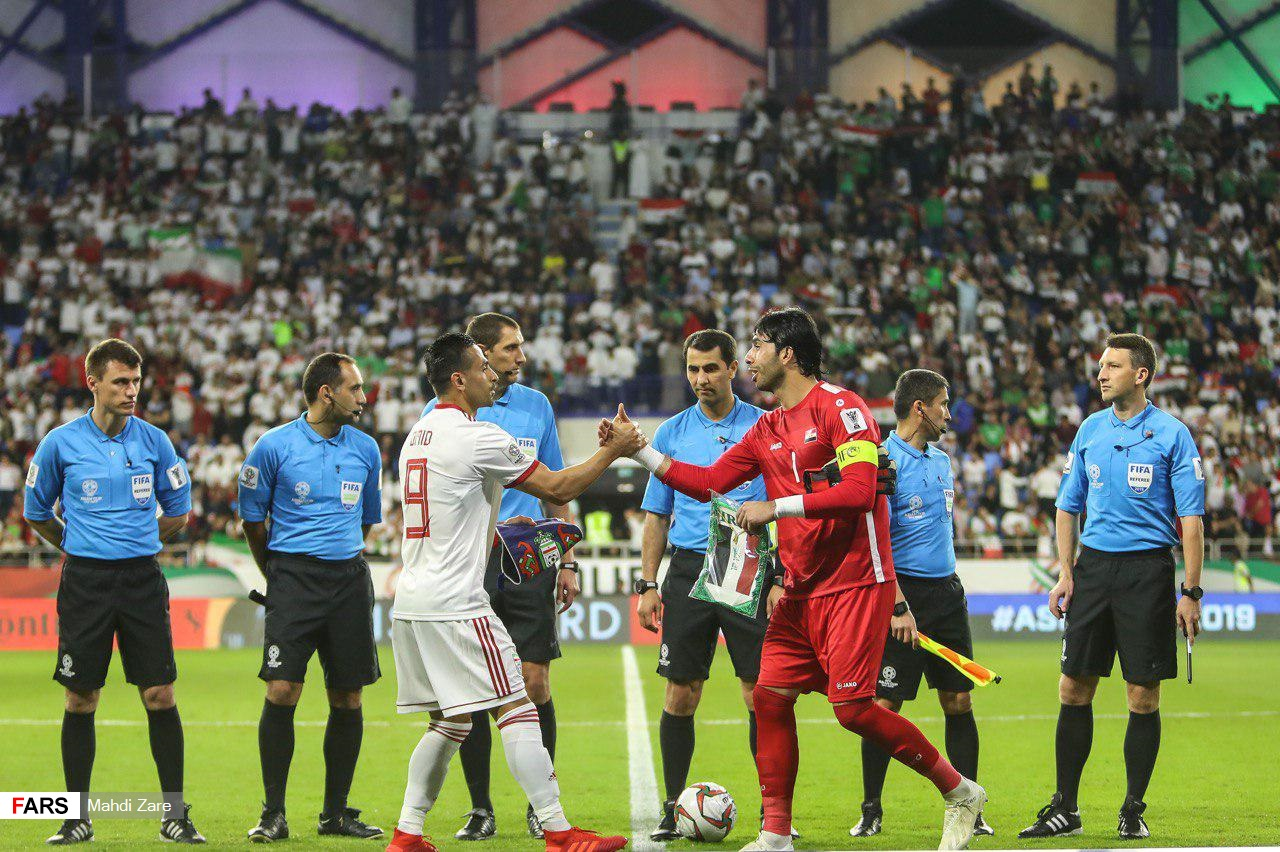
- Other names: Iran vs Iraq
- Location: Asia (AFC)
- Teams: Iran; Iraq
- First meeting: 31 May 1962 (64 years ago)
- Latest meeting: Iraq 1–1 Iran; 2026 Basra International Tournament (17 November 2026)

Statistics
- Total meetings: 32
- Most wins: Iran (18)
- Top scorer: (Iran) Ali Daei (4)
- Largest victory: Iran 4–0 Iraq; 1964 Olympic qualification (13 December 1963)

The Iran and Iraq national football teams are sporting rivals since 1962.

According to The Malay Mail, "Emotions are always high when Iran and Iraq meet on the football pitch".

The most recent match between the two teams was in the 2026 Basra International Tournament on 17 November 2026 hosted in Iraq, where the game ended in a 1–1 draw.

== Origins ==
The rivalry is not such a football-inspired ill-feeling between the two, but more of geography and history. Iran and Iraq are neighboring countries, that share a long history. In the contemporary era, especially during the reign of Saddam Hussein, the two countries reached the lowest of relations which led to a brutal, costly and devastating war between 1980 and 1988.

In 2001, an Iran-Iraq match was not held at a neutral venue for the first time in decades.

== Major tournament matches ==
1972 AFC Asian Cup

9 May 1972
Group stage

Iran	3–0	Iraq
Kalani 34', 70', 78'

National Stadium, Bangkok
Attendance: 5,000
Referee: Sivapalan Kathiravale (Malaysia)

1976 AFC Asian Cup

4 June 1976
Group stage

Iran	2–0	Iraq
Nouraei 45'; Roshan 58'

Azadi Stadium, Tehran
Attendance: 50,000
Referee: Marijan Raus (Yugoslavia)

1994 FIFA World Cup qualification

22 October 1993
Final round

Iraq	2–1	Iran
Radhi 20'; Kadhim 38'		Daei 21'

Khalifa International Stadium, Doha
Attendance: 30,000
Referee: Crăciunescu (Romania)

1996 AFC Asian Cup

5 December 1996
19:00
Group stage

Iran	1–2	Iraq
Daei 90' (pen.)	Report	Fawzi 37'; Sabbar 69'

Al-Maktoum Stadium, Dubai
Attendance: 15,000
Referee: Masayoshi Okada (Japan)

2000 AFC Asian Cup

18 October 2000
19:30
Group stage

Iran	1–0	Iraq
Daei 77'	Report

Saida Municipal Stadium, Sidon
Attendance: 8,582
Referee: Omer Al-Mehannah (Saudi Arabia)

2002 FIFA World Cup qualification

7 September 2001
20:00 UTC+04
Final round

Iraq	1–2	Iran
Mohammed 20'	Report	Karimi 30'; Daei 84'

Al-Shaab Stadium, Baghdad
Attendance: 40,000
Referee: Felipe Ramos Rizo (MEX)

2002 FIFA World Cup qualification

12 October 2001
16:00 UTC+04:30
Final round

Iran	2–1	Iraq
Mahdavikia 27'; Karimi 71'	Report	Chathir 52'

Azadi Stadium, Tehran
Attendance: 100,000
Referee: Kim Young-Joo (South Korea)

2011 AFC Asian Cup

11 January 2011
19:15
Group stage

Iraq	1–2	Iran
Mahmoud 13'		Rezaei 42'; Mobali 84'

Ahmed bin Ali Stadium, Al Rayyan
Attendance: 10,478
Referee: Ravshan Irmatov (Uzbekistan)

2015 AFC Asian Cup

23 January 2015
17:30 AEDT (UTC+11)
Quarterfinals

Iran	3–3 (a.e.t.)	Iraq
Azmoun 24'; Pouraliganji 103'; Ghoochannejhad 119'	Report	Yasin 56'; Mahmoud 93'; Ismail 116' (pen.)
Penalties
Hajsafi (penalty missed); Pouraliganji (penalty scored); Nekounam (penalty scored); Hosseini (penalty scored); Ghafouri (penalty scored); Jahanbakhsh (penalty scored); Teymourian (penalty scored); Amiri (penalty missed)	6–7	(penalty missed) Abdul-Amir; (penalty scored) Salem; (penalty scored) Ismail; (penalty scored) Adnan; (penalty scored) Mahmoud; (penalty scored) Kasim; (penalty scored) Hussein; (penalty scored) Shaker

Canberra Stadium, Canberra
Attendance: 18,921
Referee: Ben Williams (Australia)

2019 AFC Asian Cup

16 January 2019
20:00

Iran	0–0	Iraq
	Report

Al Maktoum Stadium, Dubai
Attendance: 15,038
Referee: Ravshan Irmatov (Uzbekistan)

2022 FIFA World Cup qualification

14 November 2019
16:00 UTC+2
Second Round

Iraq	2–1	Iran
M. Ali 11'; Abbas 90+2'	Report (FIFA); Report (AFC)	Nourollahi 25'

Amman International Stadium, Amman (Jordan)
Attendance: 13,752
Referee: Hettikamkanamge Perera (Sri Lanka)

2022 FIFA World Cup qualification

15 June 2021
19:30 UTC+3
Second Round

Iran	1–0	Iraq
Azmoun 35'

Al Muharraq Stadium, Arad
Attendance: 0
Referee: Ilgiz Tantashev (Uzbekistan)

2022 FIFA World Cup qualification

7 September 2021
21:00 UTC+3
Third Round

Iraq	0–3	Iran
		A. Jahanbakhsh 3'; M. Taremi 69'; A. Gholizadeh 90'

Khalifa International Stadium, Doha
Attendance: 0
Referee: Ma Ning (China PR)

2022 FIFA World Cup qualification

27 January 2022
18:00 UTC+03:30
Third Round

Iran	1–0	Iraq
Taremi 48'

Azadi Stadium, Tehran
Referee: Chris Beath (Australia)

== Matches ==
#	Date	Competition	Home team	Score	Away team	Goals (home)	Goals (away)	Venue
1	31 May 1962	Friendly	Iran	1–1	Iraq	Kouzehkanani 90'	Abbas 47' (pen.)	(Iran) Amjadieh Stadium, Tehran
2	2 June 1962	Friendly	Iran	1–2	Iraq	Kouzehkanani	Ismail 47'; Hameed 60'	(Iran) Amjadieh Stadium, Tehran
3	13 December 1963	1964 Olympic qualification (Note: Not a full FIFA international)	Iran	4–0	Iraq	Shirzadegan; Arab;		(Iran) Amjadieh Stadium, Tehran
4	2 January 1964	1964 Olympic qualification	Iraq	0–0	Iran			(Iraq) Al-Kashafa Stadium, Baghdad
5	7 March 1969	1969 Friendship Cup	Iran	2–1	Iraq	Ghelichkhani; Eftekhari	Dhiab 16'	(Iran) Amjadieh Stadium, Tehran
6	9 May 1972	1972 Asian Cup	Iran	3–0	Iraq	Kalani 34', 70', 78'		(Thailand) National Stadium, Bangkok
7	13 September 1974	1974 Asian Games	Iran	1–0	Iraq	Roshan 76'		(Iran) Aryamehr Stadium, Tehran
8	29 August 1975	1976 Olympic qualification	Iran	1–0	Iraq	Khorshidi 66'		(Iran) Aryamehr Stadium, Tehran
9	5 June 1976	1976 Asian Cup	Iran	2–0	Iraq	Nouraei 45'; Roshan 58'		(Iran) Aryamehr Stadium, Tehran
10	5 November 1989	1989 Peace and Friendship Cup	Iran	0–0	Iraq			Al-Sadaqua Walsalam Stadium, Kuwait City
11	22 October 1993	1994 World Cup qualification	Iran	1–2	Iraq	Daei 21'	Radhi 20'; Kadhim 37'	(Qatar) Khalifa Stadium, Doha
12	5 December 1996	1996 Asian Cup	Iran	1–2	Iraq	Daei 90' (pen.)	Fawzi 37'; Sabbar 67'	(United Arab Emirates) Al-Maktoum Stadium, Dubai
13	18 October 2000	2000 Asian Cup	Iran	1–0	Iraq	Daei 77'		(Lebanon) Saida Stadium, Sidon
14	7 September 2001	2002 World Cup qualification	Iraq	1–2	Iran	Emad Reza 20'	Karimi 29'; Daei 83'	(Iraq) Al-Shaab Stadium, Baghdad
15	12 October 2001	2002 World Cup qualification	Iran	2–1	Iraq	Mahdavikia 27'; Karimi 70'	Chathir 51'	(Iran) Azadi Stadium, Tehran
16	5 September 2002	2002 WAFF Championship	Iraq	0–0 (a.e.t.) (Note: Iraq won on penalties.)	Iran			(Syria) Abbasiyyin Stadium, Damascus
17	13 August 2003	2003 LG Cup	Iran	0–1	Iraq		Swadi 52'	(Iran) Azadi Stadium, Tehran
18	23 June 2004	2004 WAFF Championship	Iran	2–1	Iraq	Nekounam 4'; Borhani 54'	Mnajed 30'	(Iran) Azadi Stadium, Tehran
19	4 October 2006	Friendly	Iran	2–0	Iraq	Rezaei 25'; Rajabzadeh 70'		(Jordan) International Stadium, Amman
20	16 June 2007	2007 WAFF Championship (Note: Iran competed in the tournament with its B team squad.)	Iran	0–0	Iraq			(Jordan) International Stadium, Amman
21	24 June 2007	2007 WAFF Championship	Iran	2–1	Iraq	Badamaki 9'; Beikzadeh 21'	Sadir 86' (pen.)	(Jordan) International Stadium, Amman
22	1 October 2010	2010 WAFF Championship	Iran	2–1	Iraq	Hosseini 57'; Gholami 82'	Karim 69'	(Jordan) King Abdullah Stadium, Amman
23	11 January 2011	2011 Asian Cup	Iraq	1–2	Iran	Mahmoud 13'	Rezaei 42'; Mobali 84'	(Qatar) Ahmed Bin Ali Stadium, Doha
24	4 January 2015	Friendly	Iraq	0–1	Iran		Azmoun 57'	(Australia) Wollongong Showground, New South Wales
25	23 January 2015	2015 Asian Cup	Iran	3–3 (a.e.t.)	Iraq	Azmoun 24'; Pouraliganji 103'; Ghoochannejhad 119'	Yasin 56'; Mahmoud 93'; Ismail 116' (pen.)	(Australia) Canberra Stadium, Canberra
26	18 March 2017	Friendly (Note: Played behind closed-doors.)	Iran	0–1	Iraq		Abdul-Amir 72' (pen.)	(Iran) Azadi Stadium, Tehran
27	16 January 2019	2019 Asian Cup	Iran	0–0	Iraq			(United Arab Emirates) Al Maktoum Stadium, Dubai
28	14 November 2019	2022 World Cup qualification	Iraq	2–1	Iran	M. Ali 11'; Abbas 90+2'	Nourollahi 25'	(Jordan) Amman International Stadium, Amman
29	15 June 2021	2022 World Cup qualification	Iran	1–0	Iraq	Azmoun 35'		(Bahrain) Al Muharraq Stadium, Arad
30	7 September 2021	2022 World Cup qualification	Iraq	0–3	Iran	Jahanbakhsh 3'; Taremi 69'; Gholizadeh 90'		(Qatar) Khalifa International Stadium, Doha
31	27 January 2022	2022 World Cup qualification	Iran	1–0	Iraq	Taremi 48'		(Iran) Azadi Stadium, Tehran
32	17 November 2026	2026 Basra International Tournament	Iraq	1–1	Iran	Hazbavi 83'	H. Ali 1'	(Iraq) Basra International Stadium, Basra

== Statistics ==
=== Overall ===
Iran	18 wins
Iraq	6 wins
Draws	8 draws

== Top scorers ==
Rank	Player	Goals
1	(Iran) Ali Daei	4
2	(Iran) Hamid Shirzadegan	3
2	(Iran) Hossein Kalani	3
2	(Iran) Sardar Azmoun	3
3	Various players	2

== See also ==
- Iran–Saudi Arabia football rivalry
- Iraq–Saudi Arabia football rivalry
