= Iran–Saudi Arabia football rivalry =

Football sports rivalry between Iran and Saudi Arabia

Iran–Saudi Arabia rivalry (Asian El Clasico)
- Location: Asia (AFC); West Asia (WAFF); Central Asia (CAFA)
- Teams: Iran; Saudi Arabia
- First meeting: 24 August 1975 (51 years ago); Iran 3–0 Saudi Arabia; Olympics qualification
- Latest meeting: 9 December 2012; Saudi Arabia 0–0 Iran; WAFF Championship

Statistics
- Total meetings: 14
- Most wins: Iran (5)
- Top scorer: (Iran) Ali Daei (4)
- All-time record: Iran: 5 Draw: 5 Saudi Arabia: 4
- Largest victory: Iran 3–0 Saudi Arabia; Olympics qualification (24 August 1975); Saudi Arabia 0–3 Iran; World Cup qualification (7 January 1977)

The Iran and Saudi Arabia national football teams are sporting rivals who have played each other since 1975.

The game has been ranked 9th in Bleacher Report's "International Football's 10 Most Politically-Charged Football Rivalries" and 8th in Goal.com's "Football's 10 Greatest International Rivalries".

Iran and Saudi Arabia team have had 15 matches so far, all have been competitive, and they have never played a friendly match. The first match was played on 24 August 1975, with Iran defeating Saudi Arabia 3–0.

== Origins ==
The two have long battled for West Asian supremacy and their matches have been "always tight, tense and furiously competitive".

The countries also have had chronic political tensions in the last decades. (see Iran–Saudi Arabia relations)

The rivalry has been expanded into club matches as well. For example, after the Saudi Arabian national team's away win in March 2009, Saudi players sword-danced in front of 100,000 angry Iranian fans in Azadi Stadium. When Zob Ahan eliminated Al-Hilal in the 2010 AFC Champions League semi-final, Iranian players mocked the dance in front of Saudi fans. When Persepolis was scheduled to play away at Ittihad in the 2011 AFC Champions League, Saudi immigration authorities forced Iranian players to be fingerprinted and irises scanned upon their arrival at Jeddah airport. The Iranians refused to do so and were held at the airport for 8 hours.

Iranian football fans take most pleasure in defeating Saudi Arabia, alongside Bahrain, whose players used to wave Saudi Arabian flags when they defeated Iran 3–1 during their 2002 World Cup qualification. For several Iranian fans, regional political rivalries also affect who they support on the field, according to Aljazeera.

In 2016, clubs from Saudi Arabia refused to play in Iran during the 2016 AFC Champions League and vice versa. Consequently, the matches between the two countries were played in neutral venues for the next 7 years.

Following the improvement of diplomatic relations between the two countries, the Asian Football Confederation (AFC) announced on 4 September 2023 that matches between the national and club sides of the Saudi Arabian Football Federation (SAFF) and the Football Federation Islamic Republic of Iran (FFIRI) will take place on a home-and-away basis.

== Matches ==
#	Date	Competition	Home team	Score	Away team	Goals (home)	Goals (away)	Venue
— (Note: Not a full FIFA international)	24 August 1975	1976 Olympics qualification	Iran	3–0	Saudi Arabia	Mazloomi 12', 83'; Khorshidi 63'		(Iran) Amjadieh Stadium, Tehran
1	7 January 1977	1978 World Cup qualification	Saudi Arabia	0–3	Iran		Mazloomi 16', 78'; Roshan 62'	(Saudi Arabia) Prince Faisal bin Fahd Stadium, Riyadh
2 (Note: Iran played the match with reserve players.)	22 April 1977	1978 World Cup qualification	Iran	2–0	Saudi Arabia	Yousefi 10'; Sharifi 84'		(Iran) Hafezieh Stadium, Shiraz
3	13 December 1984	1984 Asian Cup	Saudi Arabia	1–1 (a.e.t.) (Note: Saudi Arabia won 5–4 on penalties.)	Iran	Shahin Bayani 88' (o.g.)	Shahrokh Bayani 43'	National Stadium, Singapore
4	15 December 1988	1988 Asian Cup	Saudi Arabia	1–0	Iran	Abdullah 16'		Qatar SC Stadium, Doha
5	28 October 1993	1994 World Cup qualification	Saudi Arabia	4–3	Iran	Al-Jaber 21'; Mehalel 27'; Al-Mousa; 47'; Falatah 74'	Fonounizadeh 43', 52'; Manafi 90'	(Qatar) Khalifa Stadium, Doha
6	11 December 1996	1996 Asian Cup	Saudi Arabia	0–3	Iran		Daei 12'; Bagheri 37'; Azizi 47'	(United Arab Emirates) Al-Maktoum Stadium, Dubai
7	18 December 1996	1996 Asian Cup	Iran	0–0 (a.e.t.) (Note: Saudi Arabia won 4–3 on penalties.)	Saudi Arabia			(United Arab Emirates) Sheikh Zayed Stadium, Abu Dhabi
8	19 September 1997	1998 World Cup qualification	Iran	1–1	Saudi Arabia	Bagheri 64'	Al-Shahrani 32'	(Iran) Azadi Stadium, Tehran
9	24 October 1997	1998 World Cup qualification	Saudi Arabia	1–0	Iran	Al-Muwalid 88'		(Saudi Arabia) King Fahd Stadium, Riyadh
10	24 August 2001	2002 World Cup qualification	Iran	2–0	Saudi Arabia	Daei 54' (pen.), 64'		(Iran) Azadi Stadium, Tehran
11	28 September 2001	2002 World Cup qualification	Saudi Arabia	2–2	Iran	Al-Waked 20'; Al-Yami 59'	Daei 42'; Dinmohammadi 84'	(Saudi Arabia) Prince Abdullah al-Faisal Stadium, Jeddah
12	6 September 2008	2010 World Cup qualification	Saudi Arabia	1–1	Iran	Harthi 29'	Nekounam 81'	(Saudi Arabia) King Fahd Stadium, Riyadh
13	28 March 2009	2010 World Cup qualification	Iran	1–2	Saudi Arabia	Shojaei 64'	Hazazi 79'; Al-Muwallad 87'	(Iran) Azadi Stadium, Tehran
14	12 December 2012	2012 WAFF Championship (Note: Both teams competed in the tournament with reserve players.)	Iran	0–0	Saudi Arabia			Al-Sadaqua Walsalam Stadium, Kuwait City

== Statistics ==
Team	Pld	W	D	L	GF	GA	GD	Best win
Iran	14	5	5	4	19	13	+6	3–0
Saudi Arabia	14	4	5	5	13	19	-6	4–3

Matches held in Iran	4
Matches held in neutral venue	8
Matches held in Saudi Arabia	4
Total matches	16

== Top scorers ==
Rank	Player	Goals
1	(Iran) Ali Daei	4
2	(Iran) Mehdi Fonounizadeh	2
2	(Iran) Karim Bagheri	2
2	(Iran) Gholamhossein Mazloomi	2
2	(Saudi Arabia) Majed Abdullah	2
6	Various players	1

== See also ==
- Iran–Iraq football rivalry
- Iran–Saudi Arabia relations
- Iraq–Saudi Arabia football rivalry
- Iranian Arabs
