= Poland–Russia football rivalry =

Association football rivalry

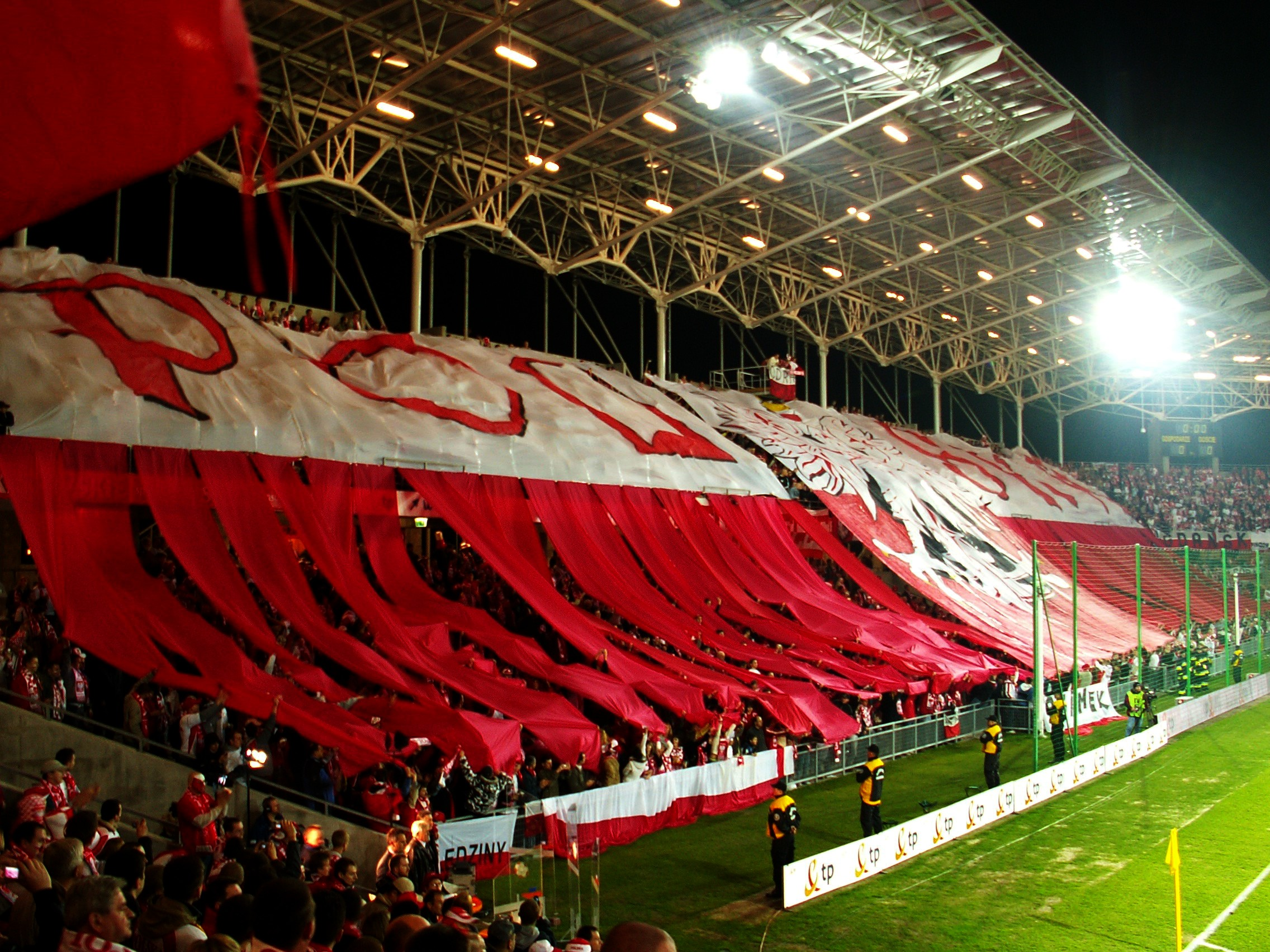
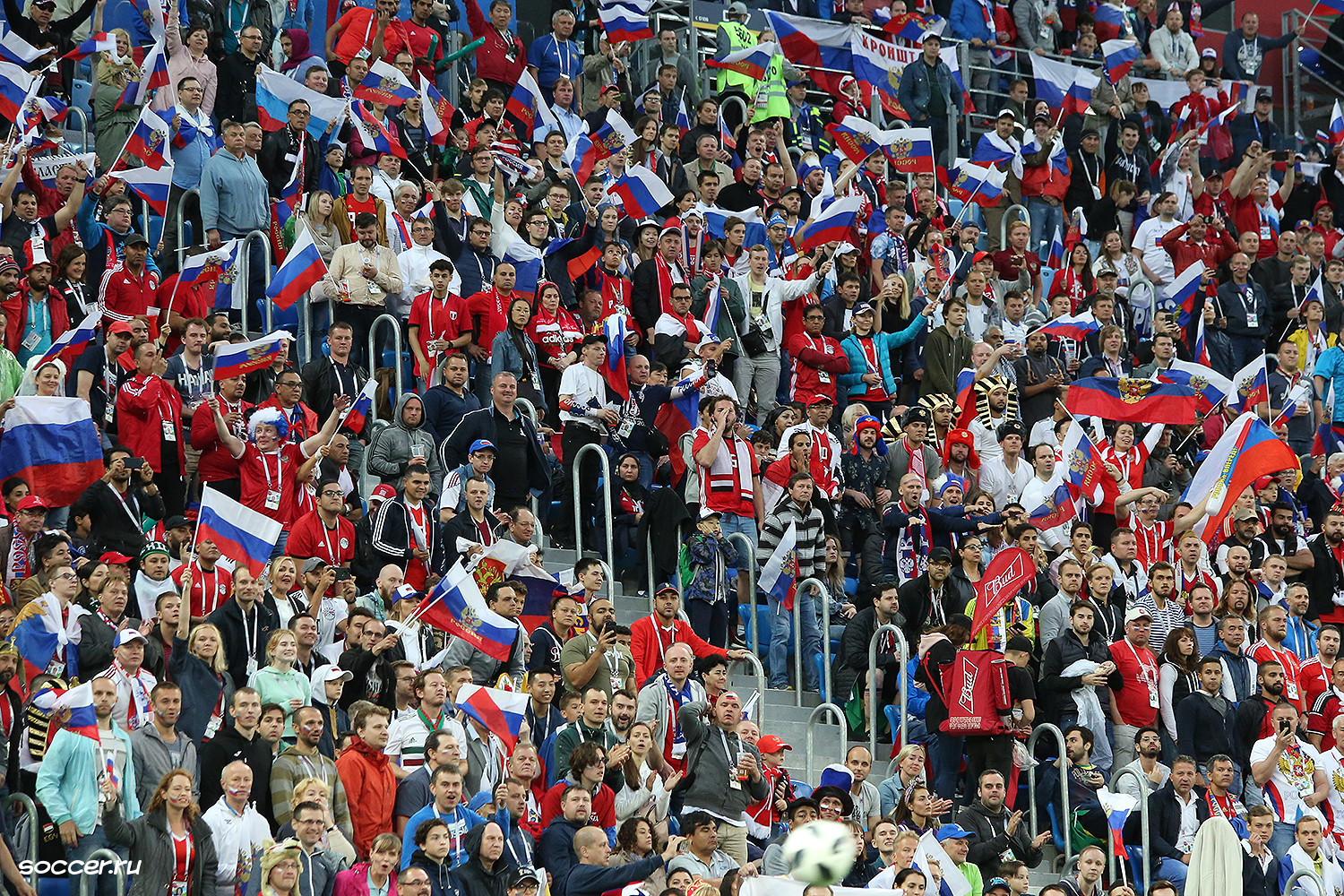
- Poland fans (top) and Russia fans (bottom)
- Location: Europe (UEFA)
- Teams: Poland; Russia
- First meeting: Soviet Union 3–0 Poland; 1958 FIFA World Cup qualification (UEFA); Moscow (23 Juny 1957)
- Latest meeting: Poland 1–1 Russia; Friendly; Wrocław (1 Juny 2021)

Statistics
- Total meetings: 19
- Most wins: Russia (9)
- Largest victory: Soviet Union 7–1 Poland; Friendly; Moscow (19 May 1960)

The Poland–Russia football rivalry is a competitive sports rivalry that exists between the national football teams of the two countries and their respective sets of fans.

The Polish and Russian teams have been rivals for a long time, were neighbors before World War II and during the Cold War. Have fought each other for centuries.

== Background ==
Poland

Russia

Both countries have conflicts with each other: Partitions of Poland, Russian Partition, Battle of Warsaw, World War II, Katyn Massacre, being under Soviet control.

== Incidents ==
The incidents took place on June 12, 2012, before and after the Poland-Russia match at EURO 2012.

== Matches ==
Poland played 19 matches against Soviet Union/Russia.

=== Poland v. Soviet Union ===
#	Date	Competition	Venue	Home team	Score	Away team
1	23 June 1957	1958 FIFA World Cup qualification	(Soviet Union) Lenin Central Stadium, Moscow	Union Soviet	3–0	Poland
2	20 October 1957	1958 FIFA World Cup qualification	(Poland) Silesia Stadium, Chorzów	Poland	2–1	Union Soviet
3	24 November 1957	1958 FIFA World Cup qualification	(East Germany) Zentralstadion, Leipzig	Union Soviet	2–0	Poland
4	19 May 1960	Friendly	(Soviet Union) Lenin Central Stadium, Moscow	Union Soviet	7–1	Poland
5	21 May 1961	Friendly	(Poland) 10th-Anniversary Stadium, Warsaw	Poland	1–0	Union Soviet
6	28 July 1967	1968 Summer Olympics qualification	(Poland) Olympic Stadium, Wrocław	Poland	0–1	Union Soviet
7	4 August 1967	1968 Summer Olympics qualification	(Soviet Union) Lenin Central Stadium, Moscow	Union Soviet	2–1	Poland
8	5 September 1972	1972 Summer Olympic	(West Germany) Rosenaustadion, Augsburg	Poland	2–1	Union Soviet
9	7 September 1977	Friendly	(Soviet Union) Central Stadium, Volgograd	Union Soviet	4–1	Poland
10	4 July 1982	1982 World Cup	(Spain) Camp Nou, Barcelona	Poland	0–0	Union Soviet
11	22 May 1983	UEFA Euro 1984 qualifying	(Poland) Silesia Stadium, Chorzów	Poland	1–1	Union Soviet
12	9 October 1983	UEFA Euro 1984 qualifying	(Soviet Union) Lenin Central Stadium, Moscow	Union Soviet	2–0	Poland
13	1 June 1988	Friendly	(Soviet Union) Lenin Central Stadium, Moscow	Union Soviet	2–1	Poland
14	23 August 1989	Friendly	(Poland) Lubin Stadium, Lubin	Poland	1–1	Union Soviet

=== Poland v. Russia ===
#	Date	Competition	Venue	Home team	Score	Away team
1	2 June 1996	Friendly	(Russia) VTB Arena,Moscow	Russia	2–0	Poland
2	27 May 1998	Friendly	(Poland) Silesian Stadium, Chorzów	Poland	3–1	Russia
3	22 August 2007	Friendly	(Russia) Central Stadium Lokomotiv, Moscow	Russia	2–2	Poland
4	12 June 2012	UEFA Euro 2012	(Poland) National Stadium, Warsaw	Poland	1–1	Russia
5	1 June 2021	Friendly	(Poland) Wrocław Stadium, Wrocław	Poland	1–1	Russia
—	24 March 2022	2022 FIFA World Cup qualification	(Russia) VTB Arena, Moscow	Russia	w/o	Poland

== Statistics ==
	Poland wins	Draws	Russia/Soviet Union wins
Soviet Union	3	3	8
Russia	1	3	1
Total	4	6	9

== See also ==
- Poland–Russia relations
- Poles in Russia
- Russians in Poland
