= Iraq–Saudi Arabia football rivalry =

Football rivalry between Iraq and Saudi Arabia

Iraq–Saudi Arabia rivalry
- Other names: Iraq vs Saudi Arabia
- Location: Asia (AFC); West Asia (WAFF)
- Teams: Iraq; Saudi Arabia
- First meeting: 22 August 1975 (51 years ago)
- Latest meeting: Saudi Arabia 2–0 Iraq; 27th Arabian Gulf Cup (29 September 2026)

Statistics
- Total meetings: 45
- Most wins: Iraq (18)
- Largest victory: Saudi Arabia 1–7 Iraq; 4th Arabian Gulf Cup (29 March 1976)

Although it has received less attention comparing to rivalry with Iran of both sides, it is one of the oldest rivalries in Asia. Emotions often run high when the two teams meet each other.

== Reason behind the rivalry ==
The main reasons for this rivalry are political differences, and historical grievances. During the Gulf War in the 1990s, Iraq invaded Kuwait, an ally of Saudi Arabia, and both fought a short but bloody war that would continue to have a major impact on their relations. Due to the Gulf War of 1991, Saudi Arabia and Iraq had no official diplomatic relations, resulting in the 2002 FIFA World Cup qualification matches between the two nations being held on neutral grounds of Bahrain and Jordan.

Recently, accusations from Iraq that Saudi Arabia is instigating terrorist groups, like ISIS and Al-Qaeda, further deepened enmity between the two nations.

== Major tournament matches ==
1976 AFC Asian Cup qualification

25 November 1975

Iraq	1–1	Saudi Arabia
Ahmed 86'		Al Mugnim 4'

Al-Shaab Stadium, Baghdad

1976 AFC Asian Cup qualification

2 December 1975

Iraq	2–1	Saudi Arabia
Subhi 13'; Hassan 41'		Bakhit 54'

Al-Shaab Stadium, Baghdad

1982 FIFA World Cup qualification

21 March 1981
First round

Saudi Arabia	1–0	Iraq
Mohammad 82'

Riyadh, Saudi Arabia
Referee: Rubio Vesquez (Mexico)

1994 FIFA World Cup qualification

24 October 1993
Final round

Iraq	1–1	Saudi Arabia
Radhi 1'		Owairan 36'

Khalifa International Stadium, Doha
Attendance: 20,000
Referee: Quiniou (France)

1996 AFC Asian Cup

8 December 1996
16:45
Group stage

Saudi Arabia	1–0	Iraq
Al-Mehallel 26'	Report

Al-Maktoum Stadium, Dubai
Attendance: 12,000
Referee: Ali Bujsaim (United Arab Emirates)

2002 FIFA World Cup qualification

31 August 2001
20:30 UTC+03
Final round

Saudi Arabia	1–0	Iraq
Al-Dosari 45'	Report

Bahrain National Stadium, Manama
Attendance: 10,000
Referee: Lu Jun (China)

2002 FIFA World Cup qualification

5 October 2001
18:00 UTC+03
Final round

Iraq	1–2	Saudi Arabia
Al-Hail 31'	Report	Shehan 1', 77'

Amman International Stadium, Amman (Jordan)
Attendance: 17,000
Referee: Óscar Ruiz (Colombia)

2004 AFC Asian Cup

26 July 2004
19:00
Group stage

Saudi Arabia	1–2	Iraq
Al-Montashari 57'	Report	Akram 51'; Mahmoud 86'

Sichuan Longquanyi Stadium, Chengdu
Attendance: 15,000
Referee: Kwon Jong-chul (South Korea)

2007 AFC Asian Cup

29 July 2007
19:30 UTC+7
Final

Iraq	1–0	Saudi Arabia
Mahmoud 72'	Report

Gelora Bung Karno Stadium, Jakarta
Attendance: 60,000
Referee: Mark Shield (Australia)

2015 AFC Asian Cup qualification

15 October 2013
19:30 UTC+3

Iraq	0–2	Saudi Arabia
	Report	Hawsawi 34'; Al-Shamrani 78'

Amman International Stadium, Amman (Jordan)
Attendance: 12,000
Referee: Abdullah Al Hilali (Oman)

2015 AFC Asian Cup qualification

15 November 2013
19:30 UTC+3

Saudi Arabia	2–1	Iraq
Al-Jassim 18'; Al-Shamrani 60'	Report	Mahmoud 45+1'

Prince Mohamed bin Fahd Stadium, Dammam
Attendance: 21,600
Referee: Masaaki Toma (Japan)

2018 FIFA World Cup qualification

6 September 2016
19:00 UTC+8

Iraq	1–2	Saudi Arabia
Abdul-Raheem 18'	Report	Al-Abed 81' (pen.), 88' (pen.)

Shah Alam Stadium, Shah Alam (Malaysia)
Attendance: 3,400
Referee: Khamis Al-Marri (Qatar)

2018 FIFA World Cup qualification

28 March 2017
20:30 UTC+3

Saudi Arabia	1–0	Iraq
Al-Shehri 53'

King Abdullah Sports City, Jeddah
Attendance: 60,153

2026 FIFA World Cup qualification

14 October 2025
21:00 UTC+3

Saudi Arabia	0–0	Iraq

King Abdullah Sports City, Jeddah

== Matches ==
#	Date	Competition	Home team	Score	Away team	Goals (home)	Goals (away)	Venue
1	22 August 1975	1976 Olympic qualification (Note: Not a full FIFA international)	Iraq	0–2	Saudi Arabia			(Iran) Tehran
2	25 November 1975	1976 AFC Asian Cup qualification	Iraq	1–1	Saudi Arabia	Ahmed 86'	Al-Mugnim 4'	(Iraq) Al-Shaab Stadium, Baghdad
3	2 December 1975	1976 AFC Asian Cup qualification	Iraq	2–1	Saudi Arabia	Subhi 13', Hassan 42'	Bakhit 54'	(Iraq) Al-Shaab Stadium, Baghdad
4	29 March 1976	4th Arabian Gulf Cup	Saudi Arabia	1–7	Iraq	Suroor 82'	Waal 3', Abdul-Jalil 6', Hassan 25', Kadhim 45', 60', 68'; Subhi 89'	(Qatar) Doha
5	5 September 1976	Friendly	Saudi Arabia	0–0	Iraq			(Saudi Arabia) Riyadh
6	14 December 1978	1978 Asian Games	Iraq	1–1	Saudi Arabia	Ali 40'		(Thailand) Bangkok
7	8 April 1979	5th Arabian Gulf Cup	Iraq	2–0	Saudi Arabia	Hassan 24', Farhan 36'		(Iraq) Al Shaab Stadium, Baghdad
8	21 March 1981	1982 FIFA World Cup qualification	Saudi Arabia	1–0	Iraq	Dabo 82'		(Saudi Arabia) Al Malaz Stadium, Riyadh
9	24 March 1982	6th Arabian Gulf Cup	Iraq	1–1	Saudi Arabia	Saeed 84'	Al-Saghir 14'	(United Arab Emirates)
10	1 December 1982	1982 Asian Games	Saudi Arabia	0–1	Iraq		H.Mohammed 17'	(India) Jawaharlal Nehru Stadium, New Delhi
11	17 March 1984	7th Arabian Gulf Cup	Iraq	4–0	Saudi Arabia	Shaker 25', Saeed 57', 70', 84'		Royal Oman Police Stadium, Muscat
12	10 July 1985	1985 Arab Cup	Iraq	3–2	Saudi Arabia	Abid 12', 18', Rashid 28'	Nu'eimeh 12' (pen.), Al-Jawad 88'	(Saudi Arabia) King Fahd Stadium, Taif
13	14 August 1985	1985 Arab Games (Note: Iraq competed in the tournament with its B team squad.)	Iraq	2–1	Saudi Arabia	Radhi	Abdullah 21' (pen.)	(Morocco) Stade Mohammed V, Casablanca
14	8 September 1985	Friendly	Saudi Arabia	3–1	Iraq		Saeed	(Saudi Arabia) King Fahd Stadium, Taif
15	10 September 1985	Friendly	Saudi Arabia	2–0	Iraq			(Saudi Arabia) Jeddah
16	30 March 1986	8th Arabian Gulf Cup	Iraq	1–2	Saudi Arabia	Saddam 75'		(Bahrain) Manama
17	1 October 1986	1986 Asian Games	Saudi Arabia	1–1 (a.e.t.) (Note: Saudi Arabia won on penalties.)	Iraq	Al-Shehrani 39'	H.Mohammed 51'	(South Korea) Seoul Olympic Stadium, Seoul
18	4 December 1987	1988 Olympic qualification	Saudi Arabia	0–0	Iraq			(Saudi Arabia) Riyadh
19	1 January 1988	1988 Olympic qualification	Iraq	1–1	Saudi Arabia	Shaker 51' (pen.)		(Oman) Muscat
20	16 March 1988	9th Arabian Gulf Cup	Iraq	2–0	Saudi Arabia	Radhi 59', Gorgis 72'		(Saudi Arabia) King Fahd International Stadium, Riyadh
21	15 July 1988	1988 Arab Cup	Iraq	2–0	Saudi Arabia	Radhi 13', 35'		(Jordan) Amman
22	24 October 1993	1994 FIFA World Cup qualification	Iraq	1–1	Saudi Arabia	Radhi 1'	Owairan 36'	(Qatar) Khalifa International Stadium, Doha
23	8 December 1996	1996 AFC Asian Cup	Saudi Arabia	1–0	Iraq	Al-Mehallel 26'		(United Arab Emirates) Al-Maktoum Stadium, Dubai
24	31 August 2001	2002 FIFA World Cup qualification	Saudi Arabia	1–0	Iraq	Al-Dosari 45'		Bahrain National Stadium, Manama
25	5 October 2001	2002 FIFA World Cup qualification	Iraq	1–2	Saudi Arabia	Abu Al-Hail 31'	Shehan 1', 77'	(Jordan) Amman International Stadium, Amman
26	26 July 2004	2004 AFC Asian Cup	Saudi Arabia	1–2	Iraq	Al-Montashari 57'	Akram 51', Mahmoud 86'	(China) Sichuan Longquanyi Stadium, Chengdu
27	5 December 2005	2005 West Asian Games	Iraq	5–1	Saudi Arabia	Abdul-Amir 8', E.Mohammed 19', Akram 30', Mahmoud 51', 78'	Al-Qadi 53'	(Qatar) Ahmed bin Ali Stadium, Al Rayyan
28	8 December 2005	2005 West Asian Games	Iraq	2–0	Saudi Arabia	Salah 33', Farhan 85'		(Qatar) Suheim bin Hamad Stadium, Doha
29	15 March 2006	Friendly	Saudi Arabia	2–2	Iraq	Temyat 18', Al-Jaber 59'	Shakroun 28', Abdul-Amir 90+4'	(Saudi Arabia) Prince Abdullah Al-Faisal Stadium, Jeddah
30	24 January 2007	18th Arabian Gulf Cup	Saudi Arabia	1–0	Iraq	Al-Qahtani 12' (pen.)		(United Arab Emirates) Al-Nahyan Stadium, Abu Dhabi
31	29 July 2007	2007 AFC Asian Cup	Iraq	1–0	Saudi Arabia	Mahmoud 72'		(Indonesia) Gelora Bung Karno Stadium, Jakarta
32	22 March 2009	Friendly	Saudi Arabia	0–0	Iraq			(Saudi Arabia) King Fahd International Stadium, Riyadh
33	28 December 2010	Friendly	Saudi Arabia	0–1	Iraq		Mahmoud 24'	(Saudi Arabia) Prince Mohamed bin Fahd Stadium, Dammam
34	5 July 2012	2012 Arab Cup	Saudi Arabia	0–1	Iraq		Abdul-Zahra 16'	(Saudi Arabia) Prince Abdullah Al Faisal Stadium, Jeddah
35	6 January 2013	21st Arabian Gulf Cup	Saudi Arabia	0–2	Iraq		Shaker 18', Hawsawi 72' (o.g.)	(Bahrain) Khalifa Sports City Stadium, Isa Town
36	15 October 2013	2015 AFC Asian Cup qualification	Iraq	0–2	Saudi Arabia		Hawsawi 34', Al-Shamrani 78'	(Jordan) Amman International Stadium, Amman
37	15 November 2013	2015 AFC Asian Cup qualification	Saudi Arabia	2–1	Iraq	Jassim 18', Al-Shamrani 60'	Mahmoud 45+1'	(Saudi Arabia) Prince Mohamed bin Fahd Stadium, Dammam
38	6 September 2016	2018 FIFA World Cup qualification	Iraq	1–2	Saudi Arabia	Abdul-Raheem 18'	Al-Abed 81' (pen.), 88' (pen.)	(Malaysia) Shah Alam Stadium, Shah Alam
39	28 March 2017	2018 FIFA World Cup qualification	Saudi Arabia	1–0	Iraq	Al-Shehri 53'		(Saudi Arabia) King Abdullah Sports City, Jeddah
40	28 February 2018	Friendly	Iraq	4–1	Saudi Arabia	Al-Robeai 21' (o.g.), Mohsin 47', Ali 51', 73'	Fallatah 57'	(Iraq) Basra International Stadium, Basra
41	15 October 2018	2018 Superclásico Championship	Saudi Arabia	1–1	Iraq	Al-Bishi 90+4'	Ali 71'	(Saudi Arabia) King Saud University Stadium, Riyadh
42	9 January 2023	25th Arabian Gulf Cup	Saudi Arabia	0–2	Iraq		Bayesh 30', Rostam 86'	(Iraq) Basra International Stadium, Basra
43	28 December 2024	26th Arabian Gulf Cup	Iraq	1–3	Saudi Arabia	Ali 64'	Al-Dawsari 57' (pen.), Al-Hamdan 81', 86'	Jaber Al-Ahmad International Stadium, Kuwait City
44	14 October 2025	2026 FIFA World Cup qualification	Saudi Arabia	0–0	Iraq			(Saudi Arabia) King Abdullah Sports City, Jeddah
45	29 September 2026	27th Arabian Gulf Cup	Saudi Arabia	2–0	Iraq	Al-Salem 54', Al-Hamdan 69'		(Saudi Arabia) King Abdullah Sports City, Jeddah

== Statistics ==
Matches held in Iraq	5
Matches held in neutral venue	24
Matches held in Saudi Arabia	16
Total matches	45
Matches won by Iraq	18
Matches won by Saudi Arabia	15

== See also ==
- Iran–Iraq football rivalry
- Iran–Saudi Arabia football rivalry
