= History of sport in Australia =

The history of sport in Australia dates back to the pre-colonial period of the country.

== Pre-1800s ==
Sport arrived in Australia with the First Fleet in 1788. None of the officers and convicts were familiar or comfortable with the sporting traditions of that era – horseracing, cricket, boxing, pedestrianism and sports involving animals, such as cockfighting. Although physical survival was more important than recreation in the first decades of European settlement, many of the new settlers brought their love of sport with them. Lieutenant George Johnston, the first European to set foot ashore at Sydney's Port Jackson, became a prominent breeder of racehorses; Captain Piper, who arrived in Sydney in 1792, was also involved in horseracing. Robert Knopwood, Tasmania's first chaplain, was part of the 'shooting and hunting set of the young Viscount Clermont' in England and lost none of his love of sport in the new colony.

Aboriginal sport, by contrast, did not exist as a separate compartment of life. The sports imported from Britain were based on notions of a division between work and leisure, something quite foreign to Aboriginal culture. Sport for Aboriginal peoples was inseparable from ritual and daily life; hunting and tracking were part of both work (acquiring food) and leisure. Aboriginal sporting traditions included wrestling, spear-throwing contests, sham fights, various types of football using possum-skin balls, spinning discs and stick games. Some sports were linked with tracking and hunting while many coast-dwelling Aboriginal peoples were adept at swimming, fishing and canoeing.

== 1800s ==
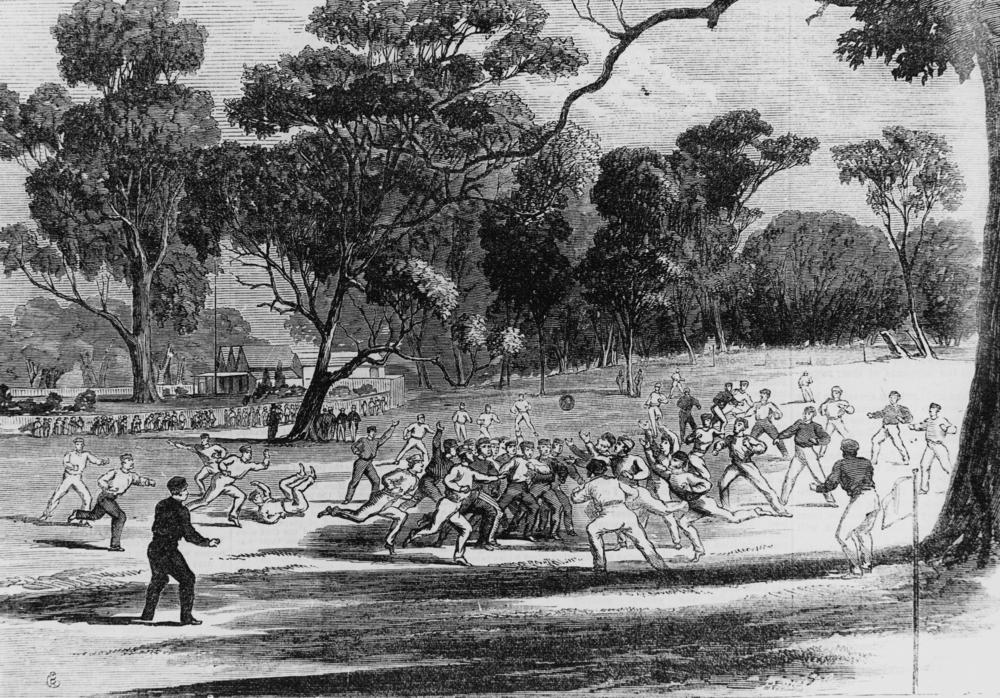
An 1860s game of Australian Rules football at the Richmond Paddock. A pavilion of the MCG is seen on the left in the background. (Wood engraving made by Robert Bruce in 1866.)

Sport came to Australia in 1810 when the first athletics tournament was held, and soon cricket, horse racing and sailing clubs and competitions started. Australia's lower classes played sports on public holidays, with the upper classes playing more regularly on Saturdays. Sydney was the early hub of sport in the colony. Early forms of football would be played there by 1829. In 1841 NSW Governor George Gipps threatened to ban football in Sydney if the playing of the game continued to flout Sunday observance standards.

Early sport in Australia was played along class lines. In 1835, the British Parliament banned blood sports except fox hunting in a law that was implemented in Australia; this was not taken well in the country as it was seen as an attack on the working classes. By the late 1830s, horse racing was established in New South Wales and other parts of the country, and enjoyed support across class lines. Gambling was part of sport from the time horse racing became an established sport in the colony. Horse racing was also happening in Melbourne at Batman's Hill in 1838, with the first race meeting in Victoria taking place in 1840. Cricket was also underway, with the Melbourne Cricket Club founded in 1838. Sport was used during the 1830s, 1840s and 1850s as a form of social integration across classes.

Regular sports competitions were organised in New South Wales by 1850 (an early form of rugby), with organised competition being played in Queensland (Rugby) and Victoria (Victorian rules football) soon after. Victorian rules football (later known as Australian rules football) was codified in 1859. Australian football clubs still around in the current Australian Football League were founded by 1858. The Melbourne Cricket Ground, Australia's largest sporting arena, opened in 1853.

The Melbourne Cup was first run in 1861. A rugby union team was established at the University of Sydney in 1864. Regular sport did not begin to be played in South Australia, Tasmania and Western Australia until the late 1860s and early 1870s. In the case of Western Australia, rugby union was initially the more popular sport; however, it was later replaced by Australian Rules football.

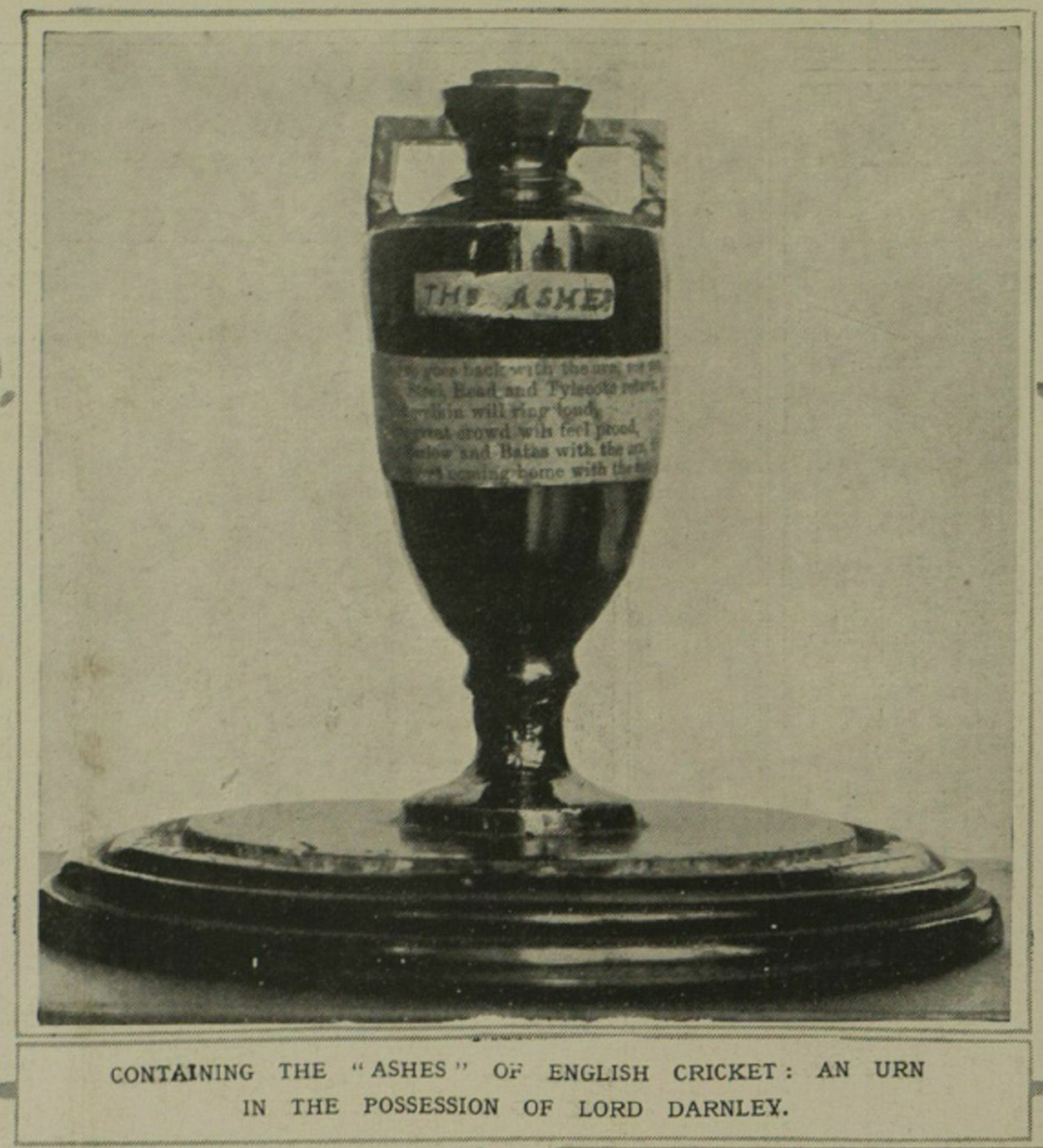
Early photo of the Ashes Urn, from the Illustrated London News, 1921

The first Australian cricket team to go on tour internationally did so in 1868. The Australian side was an all-Aboriginal one and toured England where they played 47 games; they won 14 games, drew 19 and lost 14.

Australia's adoption of sport as a national pastime was so comprehensive that Anthony Trollope remarked in his book, Australia, published in 1870, "The English passion for the amusements which are technically called 'sports', is not a national necessity with the Americans, whereas with the Australians it is almost as much so as at home."

Soccer was being played in Australia by the 1870s, with the first team formally being organised in Sydney in 1880 that was named the Wanderers. Sport was receiving coverage in Australian newspapers by 1876 when a sculling race in England was reported on in the Sydney Morning Herald.

In 1877 Australia played in the first Test Cricket match against England. In 1882, The Ashes were started following the victory of the Australia national cricket team over England. The Sheffield Shield cricket competition was first held in 1891 with New South Wales, Victoria and South Australia participating in the inaugural competition. The remaining states would not participate until much later, with Queensland first participating in 1926/1927, Western Australia in 1947/1948 and Tasmania in 1982/1983.

Field hockey teams for men and women were established by 1890.

In 1879, interstate matches in Australian rules football began with a match between representative teams from then-colonies Victoria and South Australia. Interstate matches were very important in Australian culture. With the lack of a national competition for most of the 20th century, interstate matches were given great importance as they showed which state produced the best players. Most players played in their state's league, competing to prove which league was the best. Every five years a national carnival was played, with the winners playing off in a final. Interstate matches ran from 1879 to 1999.

In 1897 the Victorian Football League, which later became the Australian Football League (AFL), was founded after breaking away from the Victorian Football Association.

== 1900s ==
Basketball was first played in Adelaide, South Australia in 1897.

The first badminton competition in Australia was played in 1900.

In 1905, the first tennis Australasian Championships was held in Melbourne at Albert Cricket Ground.

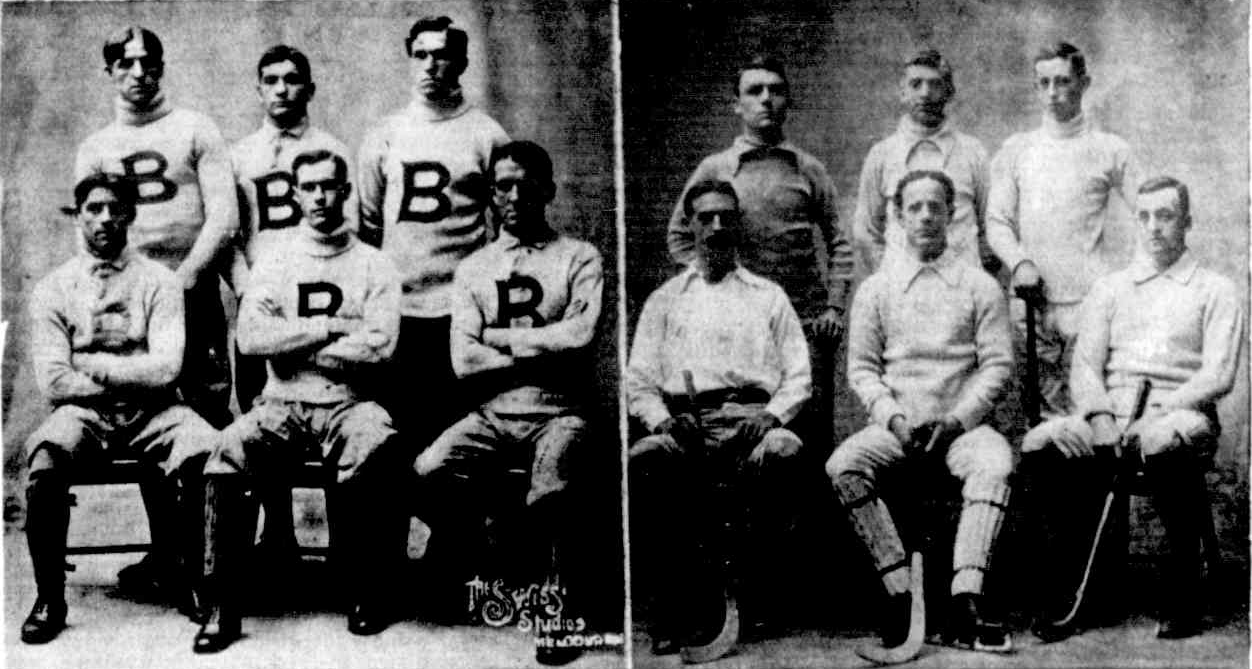
Both teams from the first ice hockey game in Australia, 17 July 1906. National Library of Australia.

Ice hockey

The first recorded game of ice hockey in Australia was held on July 17, 1906, played between a Victorian representative team and the American sailors from the visiting American warship the USS Baltimore. This game was held in the Melbourne Glaciarium. At 9:00 pm a whistle blew to clear the public skaters from the ice, so that it could be cleaned of the snowy covering generated by the public skating session before.

The American team was made up of warrant machinist F. G. Randell (team captain), Seaman F. Brooks, first class fireman T. H. Miller, seaman J. Benditti, first class fireman D. F. Kelly (goaltender) and third class gunner's mate J. T. Connolly.

The Australian team were dressed in all white. The team from the USS Baltimore wore white shirts with a large upper case black B on the front and centre of the chest and grey trousers with red socks.

The game was played in two 15-minute halves, using a red ball made from gutta-percha and curved heavy-headed sticks as used in English field hockey at the time. The skill level of the Australians was not seen to be up to the level of the Americans, but the game was hard-fought and the result of the game was a 1–1 tie. The USS Baltimore team were first to score when T.H. Miller scored a goal, but Dunbar Poole scored off a hard shot to tie up the game.

The first recorded game of ice hockey for female players in Australia was on the evening of 31 August 1908 in the Melbourne Glaciarium during Fleet Week when American sailors visited Melbourne. Though ladies' hockey matches were held previously during sports carnivals at the Melbourne Glaciarium from 1906 and the Sydney Glaciarium from 1907 during sports nights, the first game on record is from this evening.

The first Australian ice hockey association, Victorian Ice Hockey Association (VAIHA), was formed on 12 September 1908 after the close of the season in the Melbourne Glaciarium. It consisted of four ice hockey clubs:

- Beavers
- Brighton
- Glaciarium
- Melburnians

The first interstate ice hockey championship was held between a state representative team from Victoria and from New South Wales. This tournament was a best-of-3 format and saw Victoria win the series 2 games to 1. New South Wales was represented by a newly formed team in 1909 and traveled to Melbourne on 29 August 1909, which marked the first national interstate competition for senior men's hockey in Australia.

This was the year that 16-year-old John Edwin Goodall donated the J. E. Goodall Cup to the interstate series. The Victoria state team won the inaugural tournament to become the first Goodall Cup Champions, with Robert Jackson as the captain, who scored three goals in the second half of the final game. The Goodall Cup is the oldest ice hockey trophy outside of North America.

Rugby

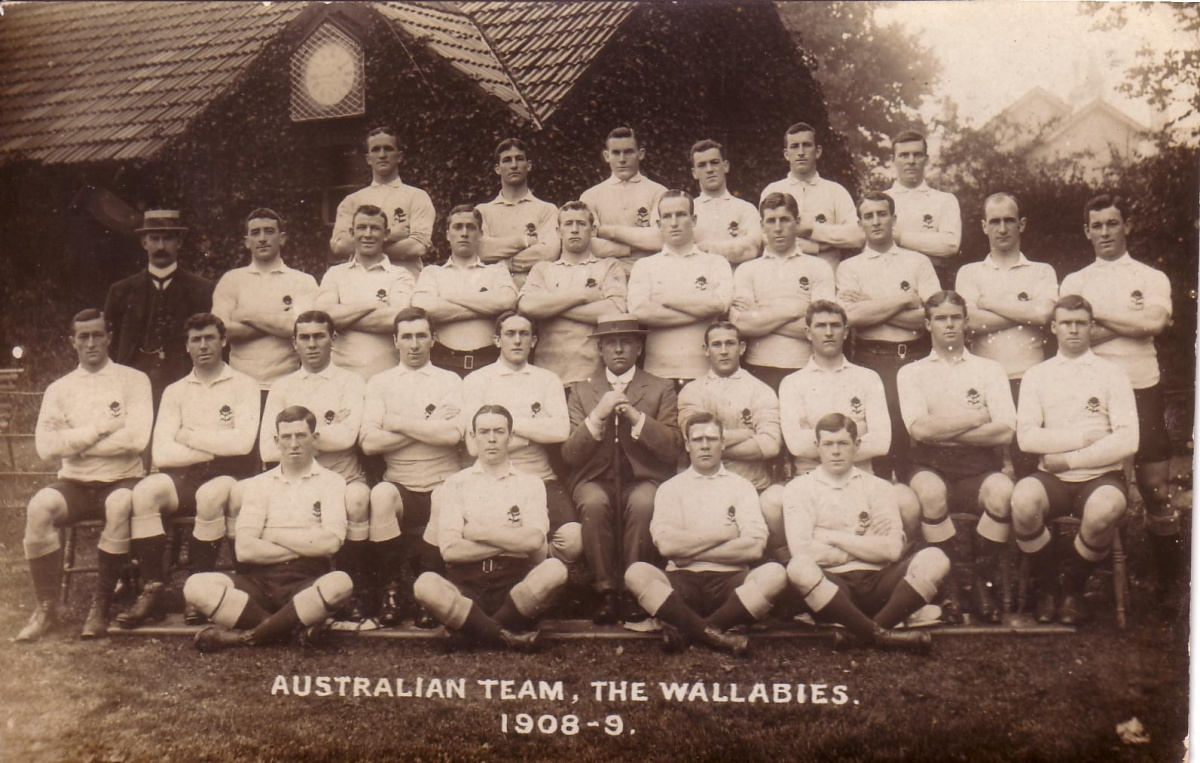
The 1908 Wallabies

The 1907–1908 New Zealand All Golds rugby tour of Australia and Great Britain saw the All Golds contest three matches against a New South Wales side under rugby union rules. Because the matches made a £600 profit, the New Zealand Rugby Union issued life bans to the All Gold players. This was a direct cause of the foundation of the New South Wales Rugby League in 1907 by JJ Giltinan and legendary cricketer Victor Trumper. Australian player Dally Messenger joined the remainder of the All Golds tour to Great Britain in 1907, where they were introduced to the new rules of rugby league by the English Rugby Football League. Players were discontented with the amateur New South Wales Rugby Union over the rejection of compensation payments for injuries and lost wages, and many players decided to join the new rugby league competition in 1908.

When Messenger and the All Golds returned from Great Britain in 1908, they helped the new clubs adapt to the rules of rugby league before the inaugural 1908 NSWRFL season. The Queensland Rugby Football League was also formed early in 1908 by seven rugby players who were dissatisfied with the administration of the Queensland Rugby Union. Queensland quickly formed a team to compete against the returning All Golds, before competing in the first interstate match against New South Wales as a selection trial for the national team, nicknamed the Kangaroos. Club rugby league began in Brisbane in 1909.

The Australia national rugby union team had their first international test against New Zealand in 1903, and first international tour in 1908, earning their nickname of the Wallabies after two British journalists used it to refer to the team. The team won gold at the 1908 London Olympics; however, the majority of the squad joined rugby league clubs upon returning to Australia.

== 1910s ==
In 1910, the Great Britain rugby league team went on their first tour of Australasia and defeated Australia to win the Ashes.

Women represented Australia for the first time at the Olympics in 1912.

Surfing came to Australia by 1915, with the first surf-life saving competition being held that year.

Les Darcy began his boxing career in 1915, with some of his later fights taking place at Sydney Stadium. The following year, an American promoter encouraged him to go to the United States at a time when Australia was actively recruiting young men for the armed services. Controversy resulted and Darcy died at the age of 21 in the US. When his body was returned to Australia, 100,000 people attended his Sydney funeral. Darcy would remain significant to Australians into the 2000s, when Kevin Rudd mentioned his story.

Australian sport during the First World War was heavily affected as many athletes joined the First Australian Imperial Force. The 1916 VFL season was contested by only four clubs. Patriotism ran so strongly that St Kilda changed their club colours because their traditional red, white and black colours were the same as those of the German Empire.

== 1920s ==
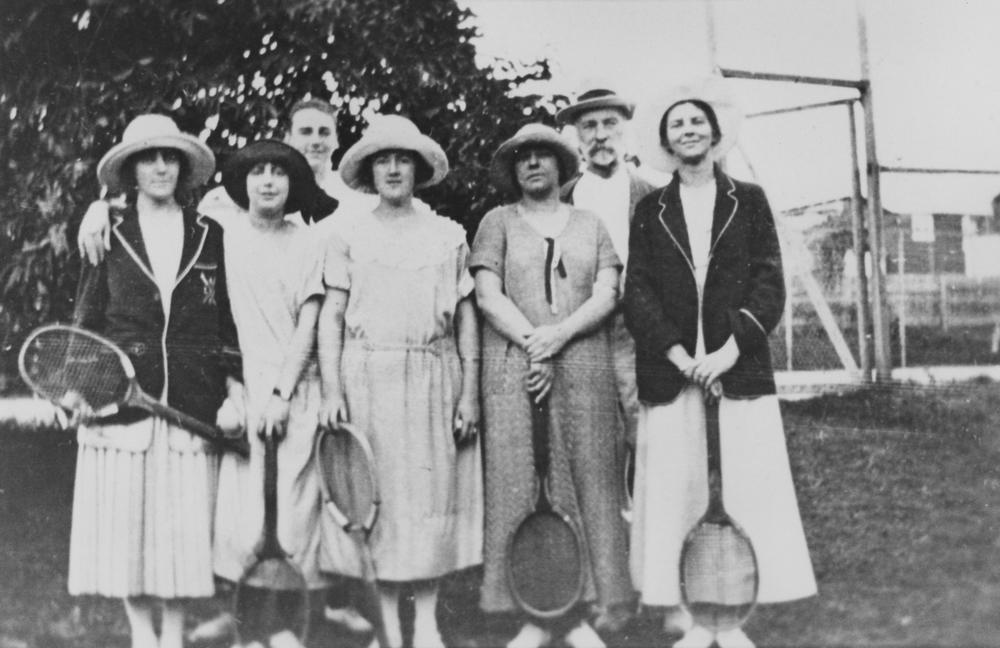
Group of tennis players, ca. 1922

In 1922, a committee in Australia investigated the benefits of physical education for girls. They came up with several recommendations regarding what sports were and were not appropriate for girls to play based on the level of fitness required. It was determined that for medical reasons, some girls should not be allowed to participate in tennis, netball, lacrosse, golf, hockey, and cricket. Football was determined to be completely medically inappropriate for girls to play. Appropriate sports for all girls, so long as they were not overly competitive, included swimming, rowing, cycling and horseback riding.

Dick Eve won Australia's first Olympic diving gold medal in 1924.

The first interstate women's ice hockey championship tournament was held in the first week of August 1922 between New South Wales and Victoria. New South Wales won the first game of the series 3-0. They were awarded the Gower Cup.

In 1924 the Australian Rugby League Board of Control, later to be known as the Australian Rugby League, was formed to administer the national team (the Kangaroos), and later as the national governing body for the sport of rugby league. In 1928 the team adopted the national colours of green and gold for the first time, having previously used blue and maroon, making the Kangaroos the third national sporting body to do so after cricket (from 1899) and the Australian Olympic team (from 1908).

In 1927, the tennis Australasian Championships was renamed as the Australian Championships and was held at Kooyong Stadium Melbourne.

Netball Australia was founded in 1927 as the All Australia Women's Basket Ball Association.

== 1930s ==
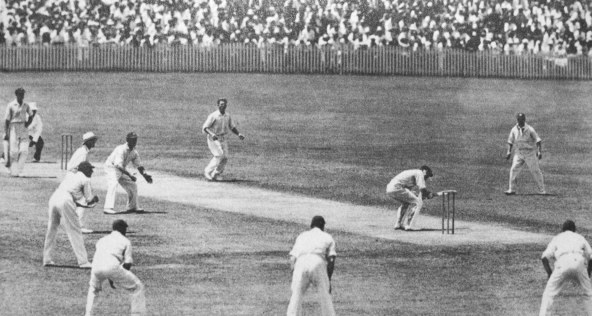
1932–33 Ashes: Bill Woodfull evades a bodyline ball at the Gabba.

During the 1930s, the playing of sport on Sunday was banned in most states outside South Australia.

During the 1930s, rugby league, which had gone professional, began to overtake rugby union in popularity in Queensland, with the league being the dominant spectator code by 1937.

The Bodyline cricket series between Australia and England took place in 1932–1933. The English side was determined to win, using physical intimidation against Australia to ensure it. The bowling style used by the team known as body-line bowling was devised by Douglas Jardine with advice from E.R. Foster in England ahead of the series to defeat Australian batter Donald Bradman. Going into the start of the series, Bill Voce told the media "If we don't beat you, we'll knock your bloody heads off." The style of play was such that the Australians contemplated cancelling the series after the Adelaide test.

== 1940s ==
Australian women's sports had an advantage over many other women's sports organisations around the world in the period after World War II. Women's sports organisations had largely remained intact and were holding competitions during the war period. This structure survived in the post-war period. Women's sports were not hurt by food rationing, petrol rationing, population disbursement, or other issues facing post-war Europe.

At noon on Boxing Day 1945, the inaugural Sydney to Hobart Yacht Race began, hosted by the Cruising Yacht Club of Australia. Rani won line honours from a fleet of nine yachts in a time of 6 days, 14 hours and 22 minutes.

In September 1949, Australian Canoeing was founded as the Australian Canoe Federation.

== 1950s ==
Australia won the Davis Cup eight times in the 1950s: 1950, 1951, 1952, 1953, 1955, 1956, 1957 and 1959. It was Australia's most successful decade at the Davis Cup.

In 1956, Melbourne hosted the Summer Olympics. The Melbourne Cricket Ground served as the Olympic stadium. Australia finished third on the medal tally, with 35 medals, and 13 gold. Betty Cuthbert won three track gold medals, the women's 100 metres, 200 metres and 4 × 100 m relay. Murray Rose won three gold medals in the pool, the men's 400m freestyle, 1500m freestyle and 4 × 200 m freestyle.

Between 1956 and 1966 the St. George Dragons set an Australian and world sporting record by winning eleven consecutive NSWRL premierships.

== 1960s ==
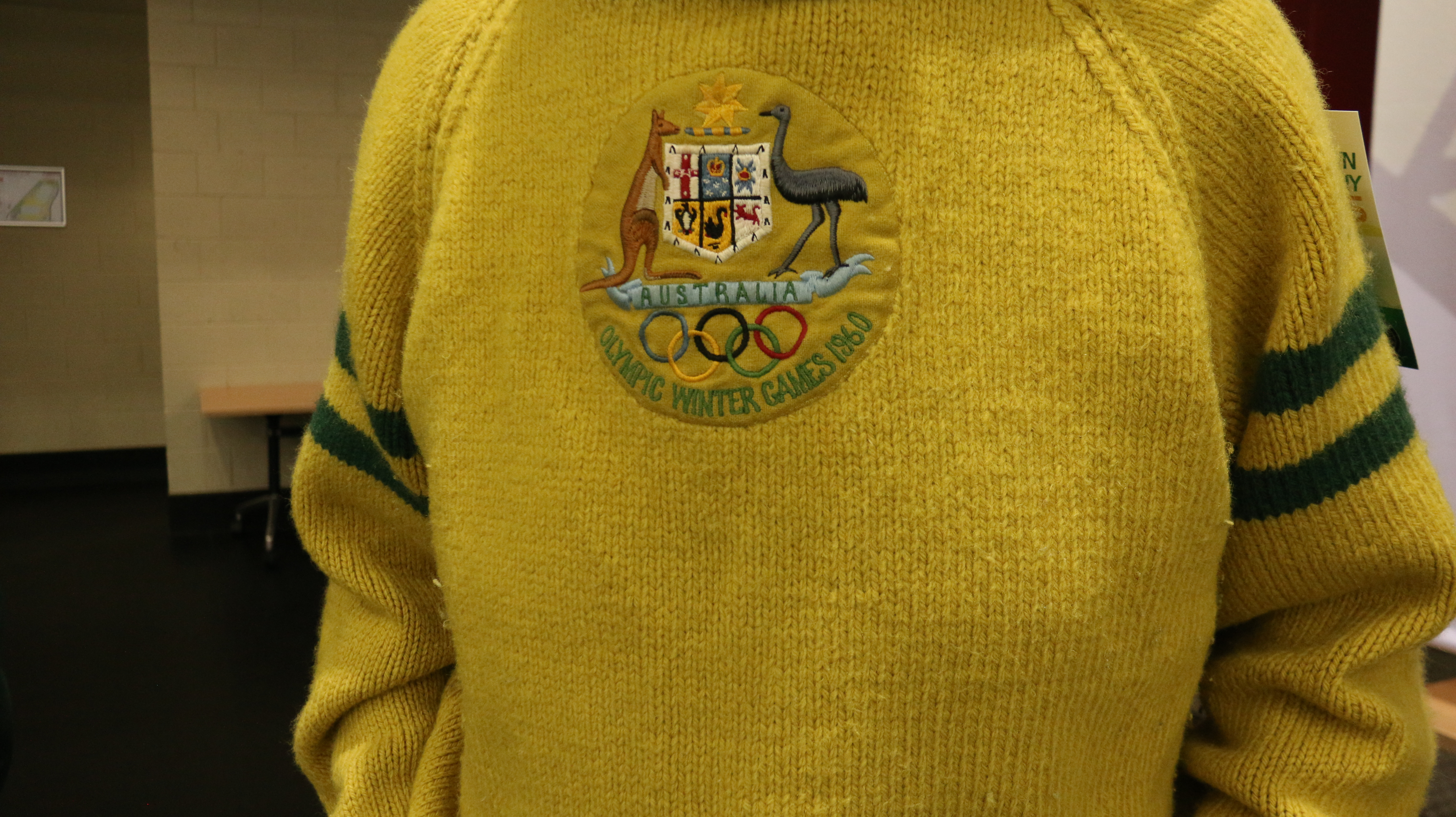
Original 1960 Australian Olympic ice hockey sweater worn by Vic Ekberg

Australia first entered an ice hockey team in the 1960 Winter Olympics held in Squaw Valley.

By the 1960s, Australia had an international identity as a sport-obsessed country, an identity which was embraced inside the country. In a 1962 edition of Sports Illustrated, Australia was named the most sports-obsessed country in the world.

In 1962 Rod Laver became only the second men's tennis player to complete the Grand Slam and repeated the feat in 1969 (the only player to do so), winning the Australian Open, French Open, Wimbledon and the US Open in a single calendar year. He also holds the record for the most number of singles titles won – between 1962 and 1976 he won 200 titles. The 1969 Australian Open was the first held under the name Australian Open.

In 1967, Australia hosted the second Netball World Championships in Perth. That same year, South Australia became the last state to lift its ban on the playing of sports on Sunday.

== 1970s ==
Starting in the early 1970s, Australian sport underwent a paradigm shift, with sponsorship becoming one of the fundamental drivers of earnings for Australian sport on amateur and professional levels. By the mid-1980s, the need for the ability to acquire sponsorship dollars in sports was so great that job applicants for sports administrator positions were expected to be able to demonstrate an ability to get it.

During the 1970s, Australia was routinely defeated in major international competitions as Eastern Bloc countries enjoyed strong government support for the sport. The Liberal governments at the time were opposed to similar intervention in Australia's sporting system as they felt it would be government intrusion into an important component of Australian life. In the 1974 elections, several Australian sporting competitors endorsed the Liberal Party in advertisements that ran on television. Competitors involved included Ron Barassi, NSWRL player Johnny Raper and horse trainer Tommie Smith. That year, the Australian team qualified for the 1974 FIFA World Cup, the first successful qualification to the FIFA World Cup in the country's history after failing to qualify to the 1966 and 1970 tournaments. The Australian squad included Harry Williams, the first Australian Aboriginal to play for the national soccer team. It would prove to be the only appearance for the Australian team for more than three decades.

In 1977 Australian rules football interstate matches adopted 'state of origin' selection rules, which meant players played in state matches for their state of origin. Sections for interstate matches since 1879 had previously been based on the state of residency.

In 1979, the National Basketball League was introduced.

== 1980s ==
The regional football code divide in Australia was still present in the 1980s, with rugby league being the dominant code in Queensland and New South Wales while Australian rules football dominated in the rest of the country. When codes went outside of their traditional geographic home, they had little success in gaining new fans and participants. The Australian Institute of Sport was founded in 1981.

In 1980, the annual three-match interstate rugby league series between New South Wales and Queensland adopted for the final match 'state of origin' selection rules. Selection for interstate matches since 1908 had previously been based on the state of residency. In 1982, origin selection rules were adopted for all interstate matches, beginning the annual rugby league State of Origin series.

In the lead-up to and during the 1982 Commonwealth Games, the police were called upon to stop protests by Aboriginal land rights activists who staged protests timed with the event to politicise the event.

Australia had competitors in the America's Cup yacht race for several years. Going into the 1983 race, the Australian media was not very interested in the race as they expected a similar result, and, in the media lead-up to the event, made it out to be a race for rich people. This lack of interest continued throughout the early races. Near the end, when Australia finally appeared poised to win, millions of Australians turned on their television to watch the Australia II win the competition. That year, the Liberals used Australian tennis star John Newcombe and race car drivers Peter Brock and Alan Jones in their political advertising. Athletes would again be used, this time by the Labor Party, in the 1989 elections.

During the 1980s, Australian soccer players began to start playing regularly in overseas professional leagues, with the most successful player of the decade being Craig Johnston, who scored a goal in the 1986 F.A. Cup Final for Liverpool.

During the 1980s, the federal government created several sports programs, including Aussie Sports and Active Australia.

The Australia women's national field hockey team began their run as one of the top teams in the world in 1985, a place they would hold until 2000.

In 1989, the Victorian Football League decided to rebrand themselves as a national league, renamed the Australian Football League. This followed the relocation of the South Melbourne Football Club to Sydney in 1982, and expansion in 1987 with the West Coast Eagles in Perth.

== 1990s ==
The major impact on Australian sports in the 1990s was the effect of media rights and in particular pay television on sports funding. It also saw a drawdown in funding from tobacco sponsorships.

During the 1990s, soccer in Australia faced a challenge in attracting youth players because of the ethnic nature of the sport at the highest levels of national competition. The sport's governing body made an effort to make the game less ethnically oriented. At the same time, rival football codes were intentionally trying to bring in ethnic participants to expand their youth playing base.

Doping became a concern during the 1980s and more active steps were taken to combat it in Australia in the early 1990s. In 1990, the Australian Sports Drug Agency Act 1990 was passed, which took control of the doping tests away from the Australian Sports Commission and put it into the hands of an independent doping control agency as of 17 February 1991.

Rugby league in the 90s was dominated by structural problems resulting in the Super League war. Following the success of interstate expansion clubs and the financial struggles of Sydney clubs in the 80s, the Bradley Report in 1992 outlined a reduction of Sydney clubs and restructure of the game as a 14-club "Super League", similar to the reforms in AFL. In 1995, the NSWRL was rebranded as the Australian Rugby League and expanded in North Queensland, South Queensland, Perth and Auckland, New Zealand. A media war between Channel 9 and News Limited over the pay TV rights for the game exposed deep structural problems and resulted in two competitions – the ARL and breakaway Super League. The two entities formed the National Rugby League in 1998, with News Limited and the ARL sharing joint ownership. Due to funding pressures, the NRL cut several clubs from the competition and tried to address the underlying problems of the code.

In 1995, rugby union became professional in Australia following an agreement between SANZAR countries and Rupert Murdoch regarding pay television rights for the game. Australia won two world cups in the 90s, defeating England in the final of the 1991 Rugby World Cup, and defeating France in the final of the 1999 Rugby World Cup.

In 1998, the National Basketball League announced that it was switching from winter to summer season for the 1998–99 season.

== 2000s ==
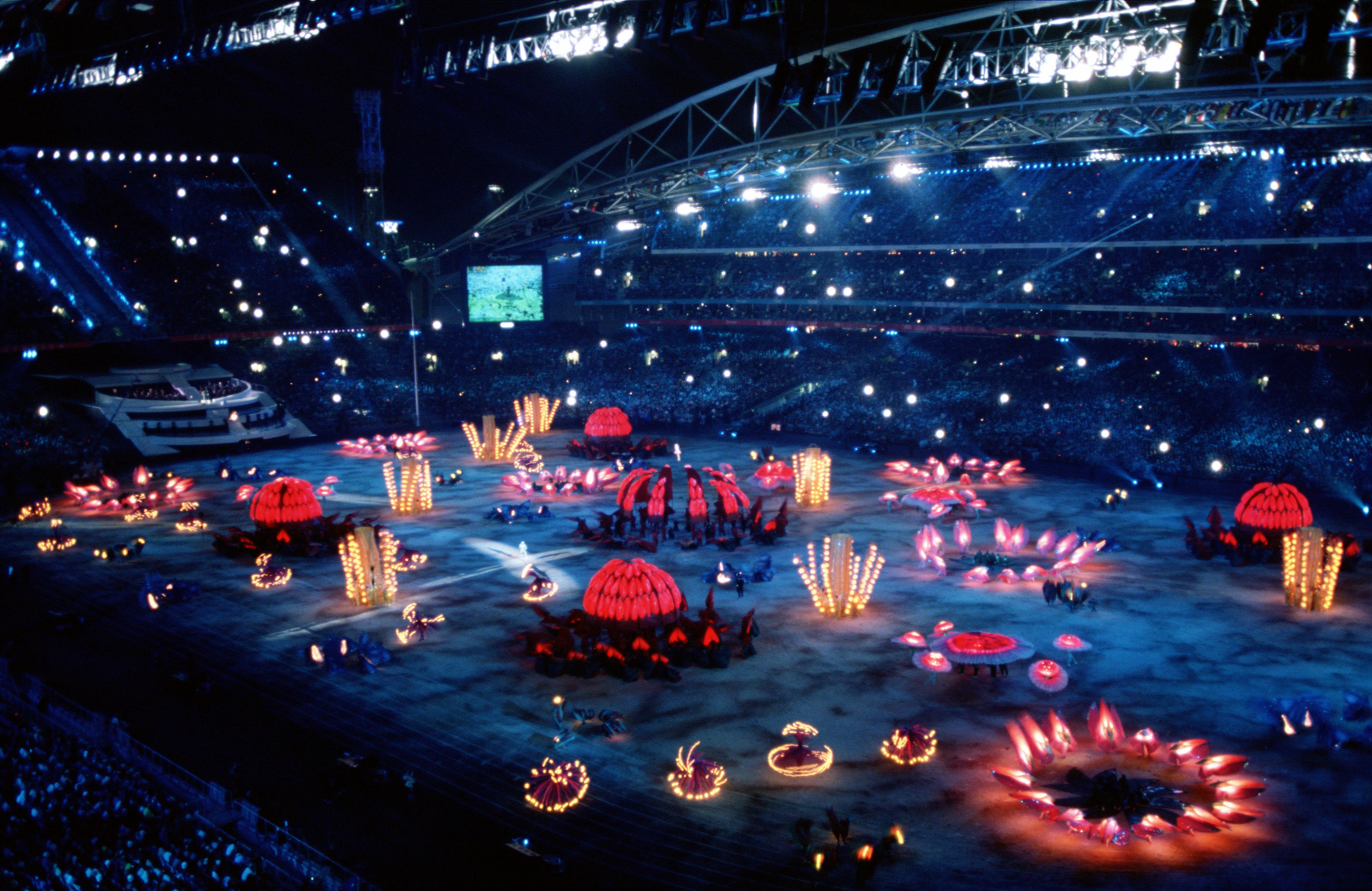
The 2000 Summer Olympics Opening Ceremony at Stadium Australia, on 15 September 2000

In 2000, Sydney hosted the Summer Olympic Games for $6.6 billion. Australia finished fourth on the medal tally with 58 medals, 26 of them gold.

In a moment of national pride, Cathy Freeman won the 400-metre final at the games. Her success at the 2000 Summer Olympics made her an unofficial spokesperson for Aboriginal sport in the country.

Also at the Olympics, Ian Thorpe won three gold medals in the 400 m freestyle, 4 × 100 m freestyle and 4 × 200 m freestyle, and two silver medals in the 200m freestyle and 4 × 100 m medley.

In 2000, Australia won the Rugby League World Cup for the sixth successive time.

In 2002, the Australian government again intervened in sports when Senator Rod Kemp, the Minister for Arts and Sport, announced that Soccer Australia was to be restructured by the Australian Sports Commission. At the time, the organisation had A$2.6 million in debt. National organisational problems were mirrored on the state level at the time of the takeover. The Australian Sports Commission delivered a report that recommended 53 changes to be made in four key areas. One suggestion involved separating the management of the national governing body from that of the national league. Former Australian Rugby Union CEO John O'Neil was brought in to make these changes. The organisation changed its name in 2005 to Football Federation Australia as part of an effort to reposition the sport in the country. The new national league, the A-League, had its inaugural season in 2004.

In 2003, Australia hosted the rugby union World Cup, and the Wallabies lost to England 17–20 in the final.

Wild Oats XI set a record by winning line honours in the Sydney to Hobart Yacht Race four years in a row, from 2005, 2006, 2007 and 2008. She also won the treble in 2005 and 2012.

In 2006, Melbourne hosted the 2006 Commonwealth Games. Later that year, the Australian team competed in the 2006 FIFA World Cup; their second FIFA World Cup appearance after 32 years of failing to qualify for the tournament.

In 2008, Australia hosted the 2008 Rugby League World Cup, and the Kangaroos lost to New Zealand 20–34 in the final at Suncorp Stadium in Brisbane.

== 2010s ==
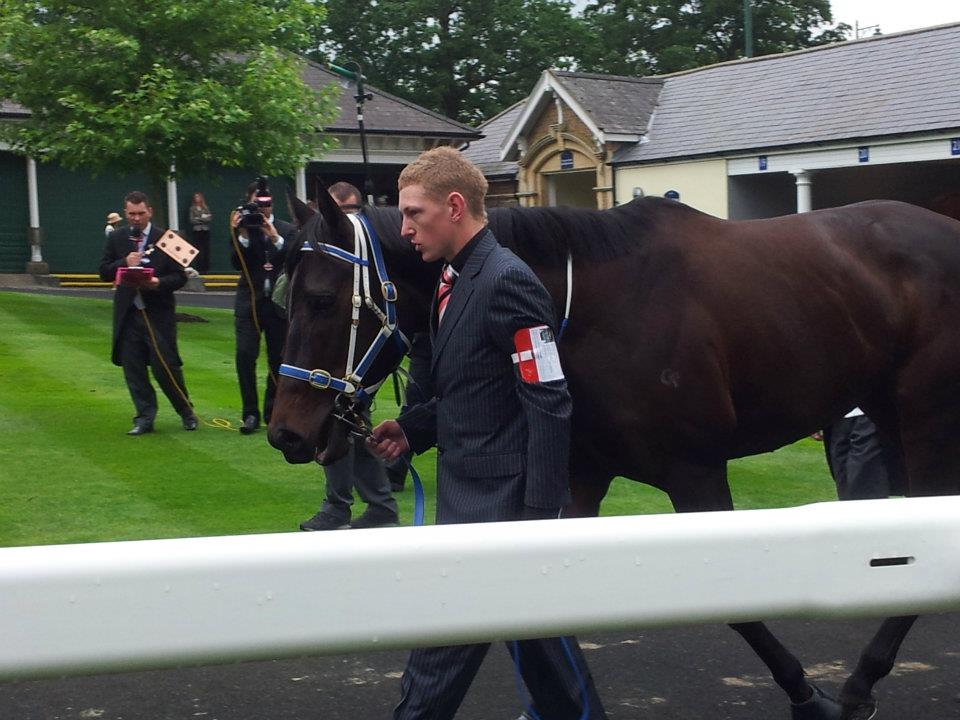
Black Caviar prior to the 2012 Diamond Jubilee Stakes at Royal Ascot

In 2009, the rugby league club Melbourne Storm were found to have been systematically breaching the NRL salary cap rules over five years. The club was fined a record Australian sporting fine of $1,689,000, stripped of two premierships and three minor premierships, and prevented from accumulating any premiership points in the 2010 NRL season.

Queensland Reds won their first Super Rugby title against the Canterbury Crusaders from New Zealand. Wallabies won the Rugby Championship and made the World Cup semi-final later that year.

The AFL became the first football code to establish two clubs in the five major metropolitan cities (Melbourne, Sydney, Brisbane, Perth and Adelaide) with expansion in 2011 Gold Coast Suns and in 2012 Greater Western Sydney Giants.

In 2012, the Australian Rugby League Commission was formed, bringing to an end the involvement of News Limited in the administration of rugby league and the media companies' conflict of interest in the sport, finally concluding the fallout from the Super League war in the 90s.

From 2008 until 2013, the Australian thoroughbred mare Black Caviar was undefeated in 25 races, a record not equalled in over 100 years. Notable wins included the 2012 Diamond Jubilee Stakes, as well as being named the top sprinter from 2010 to 2012 in the World Thoroughbred Racehorse Rankings and entering the Australian Racing Hall of Fame.

In 2014, the Socceroos competed in the 2014 FIFA World Cup. In 2015, Australia hosted the 2015 AFC Asian Cup, winning the tournament in a 2-1 victory over South Korea. Australia also won the 2015 Cricket World Cup, winning the tournament for a fifth time.

In 2015, the Wallabies (Australia national rugby union team) made the Rugby World Cup final, becoming the first team to do so four times.

In 2018, Gold Coast hosted the 2018 Commonwealth Games.

== 2020s ==
Over 20% of Australia's cricket players have South Asian heritage. Traditional Indian games such as kabaddi and kho kho also started to be played at a higher level by Australians, due to the desire to develop sporting ties with the subcontinent.

== Bibliography ==
- Adair, Daryl; Vamplew, Wray (1997). Sport in Australian history. Melbourne: Oxford University Press. ISBN 978-0-19-553590-7. OCLC 37217245.
- All England Netball Association (2009). Netball. A&C Black. ISBN 978-0-7136-7697-6.
- Andreff, Wladimir; Szymański, Stefan (2006). Handbook on the Economics of Sport. Edward Elgar Publishing. ISBN 978-1-84376-608-7.
- Andrews, Malcolm (1979). The Encyclopaedia of Australian sports. Sydney: Golden Press. ISBN 0-85558-849-7. OCLC 21526949.
- Bale, John (2003). Running Cultures: Racing in Time and Space. Taylor & Francis. ISBN 978-0-7146-5535-2.
- Bloomfield, John (2003). Australia's Sporting Success: The Inside Story. UNSW Press. ISBN 978-0-86840-582-7.
- Crego, Robert (2003). Sports and Games of the 18th and 19th Centuries. Greenwood Publishing Group. ISBN 978-0-313-31610-4.
- Crotty, Martin; Roberts, David (1 October 2008). Turning Points in Australian History. UNSW Press. ISBN 978-1-921410-56-7.
- Hess, Rob; Nicholson, Matthew; Stewart, Bob; de Moore, Gregory (2008). A national game : the history of Australian rules football. Camberwell, Victoria: Penguin. ISBN 978-0-670-07089-3. OCLC 247974138.
- Hoye, Russell; Nicholson, Matthew; Westerbeek, Hans; Smith, Aaron; Stewart, Bob (2012). Sport Management. Routledge. ISBN 978-0-7506-8755-3.
- McKay, Jim (1991). No pain, no gain? : sport and Australian culture. New York: Prentice Hall. ISBN 978-0-7248-1080-2. OCLC 24408455.
- Mojumdar, Ram Mohun (2009). History of Physical Education and Sports. Pinnacle Technology. ISBN 978-1-61820-459-2.
- Nauright, John; Parrish, Charles (2012). Sports Around the World: History, Culture, and Practice. ABC-CLIO. ISBN 978-1-59884-300-2.
- R.I.C. Publications (2008). Primary Australian History. R.I.C. Publications. ISBN 978-1-74126-684-9.
- Rolls, Eric C; Halligan, Marion; Mathews, Marlene; Cliff, Paul (1999). A sporting nation : celebrating Australia's sporting life. Canberra: National Library of Australia. ISBN 0-642-10704-1. OCLC 44839640.
- Shilbury, David; Deane, John (2001). Sport management in Australia : an organisational overview (Second ed.). Bentleigh East, Victoria: Strategic Sport Management. ISBN 978-0-9580170-0-8. OCLC 777321324.
- Smith, Holly (2011). Melbourne, Victoria and Tasmania. Hunter Publishing, Inc. ISBN 978-1-58843-779-2.
- Stell, Marion K. (1991). Half the Race, A history of Australian women in sport. North Ryde, Australia: HarperCollins. ISBN 0-207-16971-3.
- Stewart, Bob (2005). Australian Sport – Better by Design?: The Evolution of Australian Sport Policy. Taylor & Francis. ISBN 978-0-415-34046-5.
