= Australia women's national soccer team all-time record =

The list shown below shows the Australia women's national soccer team all-time international record against opposing nations. The stats are composed of FIFA Women's World Cup, OFC Women's Nations Cup, AFC Women's Asian Cup, and Summer Olympic Games matches, as well as numerous international friendly tournaments and matches.

== Head to head record ==
The following table shows Australia's all-time international record, correct as of 13 October 2026 (vs. Haiti). Only "A" internationals are included. Although there is some conjecture regarding the status of a number of games, the table includes all fixtures recognised by Football Australia as "A" internationals and as such is used to recognise caps, goal scorers, captaincy records, etc.

Key
Positive balance (more Wins)
Neutral balance (Wins = Losses)
Negative balance (more Losses)

Team	First	Last	GP	W	D	L	GF	GA	GD
American Samoa	1998		1	1	0	0	21	0	+21
Argentina	1995	2025	4	4	0	0	16	1	+15
Austria	2015		1	0	0	1	1	2	-1
Belgium	1997		1	0	0	1	0	1	-1
Brazil	1988	2024	23	11	2	10	37	35	+2
Canada	1987	2023	21	8	3	10	25	31	-6
Chile	2018	2019	4	3	0	1	10	4	+6
China	1988	2026	45	14	12	19	52	71	-19
Chinese Taipei	1984	2024	16	11	1	4	61	15	+46
Colombia	2025		1	0	0	1	1	2	-1
Cook Islands	2003		1	1	0	0	11	0	+11
Czech Republic	2000	2023	3	3	0	0	13	0	+13
Denmark	1995	2023	7	2	2	3	10	13	-3
England	2003	2025	8	2	1	5	6	12	-6
Equatorial Guinea	2011		1	1	0	0	3	2	+1
Estonia	1997		1	1	0	0	5	1	+4
Fiji	1983	2004	3	3	0	0	37	0	+37
Finland	1997	2015	2	1	0	1	3	2	+1
France	2001	2023	9	4	2	3	9	8	+1
Germany	2000	2026	8	2	1	5	10	20	-10
Ghana	1999	2007	3	1	1	1	6	4	+2
Great Britain	2021		1	1	0	0	4	3	+1
Greece	2004		1	1	0	0	1	0	+1
Haiti	2012	2026	2	2	0	0	11	1	+10
Hong Kong	1987	2012	4	4	0	0	33	1	+32
Hungary	1997		1	1	0	0	4	0	+4
Indonesia	2022		1	1	0	0	18	0	+18
Iran	2023	2026	2	2	0	0	6	0	+6
Republic of Ireland	2021	2023	2	1	0	1	3	3	0
Italy	1997	2019	9	3	2	4	14	16	-2
Jamaica	2019	2023	2	2	0	0	7	1	+6
Japan	1984	2026	31	8	9	14	37	48	-11
Jordan	2014		1	1	0	0	3	1	+2
Kenya	2026		1	1	0	0	2	0	+2
Malawi	2026		1	1	0	0	5	0	+5
Mexico	2003	2026	12	10	0	2	26	9	+17
Myanmar	2006	2008	3	3	0	0	9	1	+8
Netherlands	1997	2021	8	3	2	3	9	16	-7
New Caledonia	1983		1	1	0	0	5	0	+5
New Zealand	1979	2025	52	35	8	9	93	40	+53
Nigeria	2015	2023	2	1	0	1	4	3	+1
North Korea	1998	2026	16	5	5	6	14	20	-6
Norway	1988	2019	7	2	2	3	9	18	-9
Panama	2025		2	1	0	1	3	3	0
Papua New Guinea	1989	2004	8	8	0	0	68	0	+68
Philippines	2008	2026	4	4	0	0	20	0	+20
Portugal	1999	2022	4	0	3	1	2	3	-1
Russia	1994	2005	6	3	1	2	13	5	+8
Samoa	2003		1	1	0	0	19	0	+19
Scotland	1995	2023	5	1	2	2	4	6	-2
Singapore	2008		1	1	0	0	6	0	+6
Slovenia	2025		2	1	1	0	4	1	+3
South Africa	2022		1	1	0	0	4	1	+3
South Korea	1996	2026	23	15	4	4	37	16	+21
Spain	2022	2023	2	1	0	1	3	9	-6
Sweden	1995	2023	16	2	4	10	14	29	-15
Switzerland	2024		1	0	1	0	1	1	0
Thailand	1988	2022	9	8	1	0	32	4	+28
United States	1987	2025	35	1	5	29	33	107	-74
Uzbekistan	2007	2024	3	3	0	0	23	0	+23
Vietnam	2008	2020	9	9	0	0	44	1	+43
Wales	2025		1	1	0	0	2	1	+1
Zambia	2024		1	1	0	0	6	5	+1
Zimbabwe	2016		1	1	0	0	6	1	+5
Total			458	225	75	158	998	598	+400

== Best Results ==
The following table shows Australia's best results against opposition by confederation, Only "A" internationals are included.

=== UEFA ===
Team	Best result	Venue	Date
Austria	Austria 2–1 Australia	(Austria) Villach	7 April 2015
Belgium	Belgium 1–0 Australia	(Belgium) Brussels	20 August 1997
Czech Republic	Australia 6–0 Czech Republic	(Cyprus) Paralimni	11 March 2015
Denmark	Denmark 1–3 Australia; Australia 2–0 Denmark	(Denmark) Viborg (Australia) Sydney	11 October 2022; 7 August 2023
England	England 0–2 Australia	(Germany) Frankfurt (England) London	23 June 2011; 11 April 2023
Estonia	Estonia 1–5 Australia	(Estonia) Haapsalu	24 August 1997
Finland	Finland 0–3 Australia	(Cyprus) Larnaca	9 March 2015
France	France 0–2 Australia	(France) Angers	6 July 2013
Germany	Germany 0–1 Australia; Germany 1–2 Australia	(China) Quanzhou (Germany) Duisburg	28 January 2005; 28 October 2024
Great Britain	Great Britain 3–4 Australia	(Japan) Kashima	30 July 2021
Greece	Greece 0–1 Australia	(Greece) Heraklio	14 August 2004
Hungary	Hungary 0–4 Australia	(Hungary) Csakvar	11 August 1997
Republic of Ireland	Australia 1–0 Republic of Ireland	(Australia) Sydney	20 July 2023
Italy	Italy 0–3 Australia; Italy 2–5 Australia	(South Korea) Suwon (Cyprus) Paralimni	17 June 2008; 12 March 2014
Netherlands	Netherlands 0–1 Australia; Netherlands 0–1 Australia; Netherlands 2–3 Australia	(South Korea) Kimhae (Cyprus) Larnaca (Portugal) Vila Real de Santo Antonio	29 October 2006; 4 March 2015; 3 March 2017
Norway	Australia 2–1 Norway; Australia 4–3 Norway	(Germany) Leverkusen (Portugal) Albufeira	7 July 2011; 28 February 2018
Portugal	Portugal 0–0 Australia; Portugal 0–0 Australia; Portugal 1–1 Australia	(Portugal) Olhao (Portugal) Algarve (Portugal) Estoril	16 March 1999; 2 March 2018; 28 June 2022
Russia	Australia 5–0 Russia	(China) Quanzhou	2 February 2005
Scotland	Scotland 0–1 Australia	(Scotland) Livingston	6 September 2003
Slovenia	Australia 3–0 Slovenia	(Australia) Perth	26 June 2025
Spain	Australia 3–2 Spain	(Australia) Sydney	19 February 2023
Sweden	Australia 4–0 Sweden	(Australia) Melbourne	12 November 2022
Switzerland	Switzerland 1–1 Australia	(Switzerland) Zurich	25 October 2024
Wales	Wales 1–2 Australia	(Wales) Cardiff	25 October 2025

=== CONMEBOL ===
Team	Best result	Venue	Date
Argentina	Australia 7–0 Argentina	(Brazil) Uberlandia	10 April 1995
Brazil	Australia 6–1 Brazil	(United States) Carson	3 August 2017
Chile	Australia 5–0 Chile	(Australia) Newcastle	13 November 2018
Colombia	Australia 1–2 Colombia	(United States) San Diego	26 February 2025

=== CONCACAF ===
Team	Best result	Venue	Date
Canada	Australia 4–0 Canada	(Australia) Melbourne	31 July 2023
Haiti	Haiti 1–7 Australia	(France) Chambly	13 October 2026
Jamaica	Australia 4–1 Jamaica; Australia 3–0 Jamaica	(France) Grenoble (Australia) Newcastle	18 June 2019; 22 February 2023
Mexico	Australia 4–0 Mexico	(Australia) Melbourne	30 May 2006
Panama	Australia 3–2 Panama	(Australia) Perth	8 July 2025
United States	United States 0–1 Australia	(United States) Seattle	27 July 2017

=== CAF ===
Team	Best result	Venue	Date
Equatorial Guinea	Equatorial Guinea 2–3 Australia	(Germany) Bochum	3 July 2011
Ghana	Ghana 1–4 Australia	(China) Hangzhou	12 September 2007
Kenya	Kenya 0–2 Australia	(Kenya) Nairobi	15 April 2026
Malawi	Australia 5–0 Malawi	(Kenya) Nairobi	11 April 2026
Nigeria	Nigeria 0–2 Australia	(Canada) Winnipeg	12 June 2015
South Africa	Australia 4–1 South Africa	(England) London	8 October 2022
Zambia	Australia 6–5 Zambia	(France) Nice	28 July 2024
Zimbabwe	Zimbabwe 1–6 Australia	(Brazil) Salvador	9 August 2016

=== AFC ===
Team	Best result	Venue	Date
China	Australia 5–1 China	(Australia) Geelong	26 November 2017
Chinese Taipei	Chinese Taipei 0–10 Australia	(Taiwan) Kaohsiung	15 April 2007
Hong Kong	Australia 15–0 Hong Kong	(Australia) Coffs Harbour	7 April 2007
Indonesia	Australia 18–0 Indonesia	(India) Mumbai	21 January 2022
Iran	Australia 4–0 Iran	(Australia) Gold Coast	5 March 2026
Japan	Australia 6–2 Japan	(China) Xi'an	5 October 1984
Jordan	Australia 3–1 Jordan	(Vietnam) Ho Chi Minh City	16 May 2014
North Korea	North Korea 0–1 Australia; Australia 3–2 North Korea; Australia 2–1 North Korea; Australia 2–1 North Korea; Australia 2–1 North Korea	(North Korea) Pyongyang (Australia) Brisbane (New Zealand) Auckland (Japan) Osaka (Australia) Perth	4 September 1998; 6 March 2010; 10 February 2015; 7 March 2016; 13 March 2026
Myanmar	Australia 5–1 Myanmar	(Vietnam) Ho Chi Minh City	18 October 2008
Philippines	Australia 8–0 Philippines	(Australia) Perth	29 October 2023
Singapore	Australia 6–0 Singapore	(Vietnam) Ho Chi Minh City	13 October 2008
South Korea	Australia 4–0 South Korea	(Australia) Adelaide	16 July 2006
Thailand	Australia 6–0 Thailand	(Australia) Sydney	10 February 2020
Uzbekistan	Uzbekistan 0–10 Australia; Australia 10–0 Uzbekistan	(Taiwan) Kaohsiung (Australia) Melbourne	23 February 2007; 28 February 2024
Vietnam	Australia 11–0 Vietnam	(Australia) Sydney	21 May 2015

=== OFC ===
Team	Best result	Venue	Date
American Samoa	Australia 21–0 American Samoa	(New Zealand) Auckland	9 October 1998
Cook Islands	Australia 11–0 Cook Islands	(Australia) Canberra	7 April 2003
Fiji	Australia 17–0 Fiji	(New Zealand) Auckland	15 October 1998
New Caledonia	New Caledonia 0–5 Australia	(New Caledonia) Noumea	30 November 1983
New Zealand	Australia 5–0 New Zealand	(Australia) Gosford	28 November 2025
Papua New Guinea	Australia 13–0 Papua New Guinea	(Australia) Canberra	9 April 2003
Samoa	Australia 19–0 Samoa	(Australia) Canberra	5 April 2003

== FIFA world rankings ==
As of 11 December 2025

Best ranking Worst ranking Biggest climb Biggest fall

Australia's FIFA world rankings
Final Rank	Year	Best Rank	Worst Rank	Biggest Climb	Biggest Fall
15	2025	15	16	▲1	▼1
15	2024	12	15	Steady	▼3
12	2023	10	12	▲2	▼1
12	2022	12	13	▲1	▼1
11	2021	9	11	Steady	▼2
7	2020	7	7	Steady	Steady
7	2019	6	8	▲1	▼2
6	2018	6	8	▲2	▼2
4	2017	4	8	▲2	▼2
6	2016	5	7	▲1	▼4
9	2015	9	10	▲1	Steady
10	2014	9	11	▲2	▼2
9	2013	8	10	▲2	▼1
9	2012	9	10	▲1	Steady
10	2011	9	11	▲2	▼1
12	2010	11	14	▲3	▼1
14	2009	14	14	Steady	Steady
14	2008	12	14	▲2	Steady
12	2007	12	15	▲3	▼1
15	2006	15	15	Steady	Steady
15	2005	15	16	▲1	▼1
15	2004	15	16	▲1	Steady
16	2003	15	16	Steady	▼1

== Asian Cup ==
The Australia women's national soccer team has represented Australia at the AFC Women's Asian Cup on seven occasions in 2006, 2008, 2010, 2014, 2018, 2022 and 2026. Australia sent representatives teams to the 1975 and 1980 AFC Women's Championship however these are not considered to be full 'A' International squads and fixtures. Australia hosted the 2006 and 2026 editions and were champions in 2010.

=== Record ===
AFC Women's Asian Cup									Qualification					
Year	Result	Position	Pld	W	D	L	GF	GA	Pld	W	D	L	GF	GA
(British Hong Kong) 1975	Third place	3rd	4	2	0	2	12	6	No Qualification					
(Taiwan) 1977	Not an AFC member								No Qualification					
(India) 1980	Third place match	3rd/4th	6	2	0	4	4	10	No Qualification					
1981–2003	Not an AFC member								No Qualification					
(Australia) 2006	Runners-up	2nd	6	4	2	0	15	2	Qualified as host					
(Vietnam) 2008	Fourth place	4th	5	2	0	3	7	9	Directly Qualified					
(China) 2010	Champions	1st	5	4	0	1	7	3	Directly Qualified					
(Vietnam) 2014	Runners-up	2nd	5	3	1	1	9	5	Directly Qualified					
(Jordan) 2018	Runners-up	2nd	5	1	3	1	11	4	Directly Qualified					
(India) 2022	Quarter-finals	5th	4	3	0	1	24	2	Directly Qualified					
(Australia) 2026	Runners-up	2nd	6	4	1	1	12	6	Qualified as host					
(Uzbekistan) 2029	To be determined								0	0	0	0	0	0
Total:7/20	1 Title		46	25	7	14	101	47	0	0	0	0	0	0

=== Head-to-head record ===
Opponent	Pld	W	D	L	GF	GA	GD	Win %
China	3	1	1	1	4	4	+0	33.33
Chinese Taipei	1	1	0	0	4	0	+4	100.00
Indonesia	1	1	0	0	18	0	+18	100.00
Iran	1	1	0	0	4	0	+4	100.00
Japan	9	2	2	5	7	12	−5	22.22
Jordan	1	1	0	0	3	1	+2	100.00
Myanmar	1	1	0	0	2	0	+2	100.00
North Korea	4	1	2	1	3	5	−2	25.00
Philippines	2	2	0	0	5	0	+5	100.00
South Korea	7	4	2	1	14	6	+8	57.14
Thailand	3	2	1	0	9	3	+6	66.67
Vietnam	3	3	0	0	12	0	+12	100.00
Total	36	20	8	8	85	31	+54	55.56

=== 2006 AFC Women's Asian Cup ===
==== Group stage ====
Team	Pld	W	D	L	GF	GA	GD	Pts
North Korea	4	3	1	0	13	0	+13	10
Australia	4	3	1	0	11	0	+11	10
South Korea	4	2	0	2	14	6	+8	6
Thailand	4	1	0	3	2	26	−24	3
Myanmar	4	0	0	4	2	10	−8	0

Source: RSSSF
16 July 2006
14:30

Australia	4–0	South Korea
Shin Sun-nam 30' (o.g.); Walsh 66'; Munoz 75'; De Vanna 87'	Report

Hindmarsh Stadium, Adelaide
Attendance: 3,000
Referee: Bentla D'Coth (India)

18 July 2006
14:30

Myanmar	0–2	Australia
	Report	Shipard 31'; De Vanna 77'

Hindmarsh Stadium, Adelaide
Attendance: 2,000
Referee: Dongqing Zhang (China)

22 July 2006
19:00

Australia	0–0	North Korea
	Report

Hindmarsh Stadium, Adelaide
Attendance: 4,000
Referee: Mayumi Oiwa (Japan)

24 July 2006
14:30

Thailand	0–5	Australia
	Report	Ferguson 3'; Burgess 27'; Walsh 53'; Gill 62'; De Vanna 81'

Marden Sports Complex, Adelaide
Attendance: 400
Referee: Hong Eun-ah (South Korea)

==== Semi-final ====
27 July 2006
16:30

Australia	2–0	Japan
Munoz 10'; Peters 45'	Report

Hindmarsh Stadium, Adelaide
Attendance: 4,000
Referee: Jenny Palmqvist (Sweden)

==== Final ====
30 July 2006
15:30

Australia	2–2 (a.e.t.)	China
Munoz 29'; Peters 33'	Report	Han Duan 68'; Ma Xiaoxu 73'
Penalties
McCallum (penalty missed); Shipard (penalty scored); Peters (penalty missed); Ferguson (penalty scored)	2–4	(penalty scored) Ma Xiaoxu; (penalty scored) Bi Yan; (penalty scored) Li Jie; (penalty scored) Han Duan

Hindmarsh Stadium, Adelaide
Attendance: 5,168
Referee: Mayumi Oiwa (Japan)

=== 2008 AFC Women's Asian Cup ===
==== Group stage ====
Team	Pld	W	D	L	GF	GA	GD	Pts
Japan	3	2	0	1	15	4	+11	6
Australia	3	2	0	1	7	3	+4	6
South Korea	3	2	0	1	5	3	+2	6
Chinese Taipei	3	0	0	3	0	17	−17	0

Source: RSSSF
29 May 2008
17:00

Australia	4–0	Chinese Taipei
Garriock 19', 42'; Tristram 51'; De Vanna 82'	Report (AFC); Report

Thống Nhất Stadium, Ho Chi Minh City
Attendance: 600
Referee: Ri Hong-sil (North Korea)

31 May 2008
19:30

South Korea	0–2	Australia
	Report (AFC); Report	Perry 30'; De Vanna 69'

Thống Nhất Stadium, Ho Chi Minh City
Attendance: 300
Referee: Bentla D'Coth (India)

2 June 2008
17:00

Australia	1–3	Japan
Polkinghorne 70'	Report (AFC); Report	Ando 8'; Nagasato 33'; Miyama 50'

Thống Nhất Stadium, Ho Chi Minh City
Attendance: 300
Referee: Ri Hong-sil (North Korea)

==== Semi-final ====
5 June 2008
16:00

North Korea	3–0	Australia
Ri Kum-suk 2', 41', 60'	Report (AFC); Report

Thống Nhất Stadium, Ho Chi Minh City
Attendance: 2,700
Referee: Pannipar Kamnueng (Thailand)

==== Third place match ====
8 June 2008
16:00

Australia	0–3	Japan
	Report (AFC); Report	Nagasato 15'; Miyama 78'; Sawa 86'

Thống Nhất Stadium, Ho Chi Minh City
Attendance: 1,200
Referee: Hong Eun-ah (South Korea)

=== 2010 AFC Women's Asian Cup ===
==== Group stage ====
Team	Pld	W	D	L	GF	GA	GD	Pts
China (H)	3	2	1	0	6	0	+6	7
Australia	3	2	0	1	5	2	+3	6
South Korea	3	1	1	1	6	3	+3	4
Vietnam	3	0	0	3	0	12	−12	0

Source: RSSSF
(H) Hosts
19 May 2010
15:00 UTC+08:00

Australia	2–0	Vietnam
Khamis 29'; Ledbrook 51' (pen.)	Report (AFC)

Chengdu Sports Center Stadium, Chengdu
Attendance: 1,000
Referee: Ri Hyang-ok (North Korea)

21 May 2010
15:00 UTC+08:00

South Korea	1–3	Australia
Kang Sun-mi 71'	Report (AFC)	Carroll 52'; De Vanna 59'; Kerr 66'

Chengdu Sports Center Stadium, Chengdu
Attendance: 600
Referee: Sachiko Yamagishi (Japan)

23 May 2010
16:00 UTC+08:00

China	1–0	Australia
Zhang Rui 9'	Report (AFC)

Chengdu Sports Center Stadium, Chengdu
Attendance: 11,000
Referee: Sachiko Yamagishi (Japan)

==== Semi-final ====
27 May 2010
16:00 UTC+08:00

Japan	0–1	Australia
	Report (AFC)	Gill 45+1'

Chengdu Sports Center Stadium, Chengdu
Attendance: 1,200
Referee: Pannipar Kamnueng (Thailand)

==== Final ====
30 May 2010
19:30 UTC+08:00

Australia	1–1 (a.e.t.)	North Korea
Kerr 19'	Report (AFC)	Jo Yun-mi 73'
Penalties
Shipard (penalty scored); Ledbrook (penalty scored); Gill (penalty scored); Garriock (penalty scored); Simon (penalty scored)	5–4	(penalty scored) Jo Yun-mi; (penalty missed) Yun Song-mi; (penalty scored) Choe Yong-sim; (penalty scored) Yu Jong-hui; (penalty scored) Mun Chol-mi

Chengdu Sports Center Stadium, Chengdu
Attendance: 1,200
Referee: Sachiko Yamagichi (Japan)

=== 2014 AFC Women's Asian Cup ===
==== Group stage ====
Pos	Team	Pld	W	D	L	GF	GA	GD	Pts	Qualification
1	Japan	3	2	1	0	13	2	+11	7	Knockout stage and Women's World Cup
2	Australia	3	2	1	0	7	3	+4	7	Knockout stage and Women's World Cup
3	Vietnam (H)	3	1	0	2	3	7	−4	3	Repechage play-off
4	Jordan	3	0	0	3	2	13	−11	0	

Source: AFC Schedule & Results
(H) Hosts
14 May 2014
20:15

Australia	2–2	Japan
Foord 21'; De Vanna 64'	Report (AFC); Report	Polkinghorne 71' (o.g.); Ōgimi 84'

Thống Nhất Stadium, Ho Chi Minh City
Attendance: 2,000
Referee: Qin Liang (China)

16 May 2014
17:15

Jordan	1–3	Australia
Al-Naber 70'	Report (AFC); Report	Gill 35', 50'; Gorry 66'

Thống Nhất Stadium, Ho Chi Minh City
Attendance: 1,200
Referee: Ri Hyang-ok (North Korea)

18 May 2014
19:15

Vietnam	0–2	Australia
	Report (AFC); Report	Lê Thị Thương 42' (o.g.); Gorry 90'

Thống Nhất Stadium, Ho Chi Minh City
Attendance: 3,000
Referee: Pannipar Kamnueng (Thailand)

==== Semi-final ====
22 May 2014
20:45

South Korea	1–2	Australia
Park Eun-sun 53' (pen.)	Report (AFC); Report	Gorry 47'; Kellond-Knight 77'

Thống Nhất Stadium, Ho Chi Minh City
Attendance: 700
Referee: Rita Gani (Malaysia)

==== Final ====
25 May 2014
20:15

Japan	1–0	Australia
Iwashimizu 28'	Report (AFC); Report

Thống Nhất Stadium, Ho Chi Minh City
Attendance: 10,000
Referee: Qin Liang (China)

=== 2018 AFC Women's Asian Cup ===
==== Group stage ====
Pos	Team	Pld	W	D	L	GF	GA	GD	Pts	Qualification
1	Australia	3	1	2	0	9	1	+8	5 (Note: Head-to-head results: Australia 0–0 South Korea, South Korea 0–0 Japan, Japan 1–1 Australia. Head-to-head standings: Australia: 2 pts, 0 GD, 1 GF; Japan: 2 pts, 0 GD, 1 GF; South Korea: 2 pts, 0 GD, 0 GF; South Korea are ranked third on head-to-head goals scored. Australia and Japan are tied on their own head-to-head result, and are ranked on total goal difference.)	Knockout stage and 2019 FIFA Women's World Cup
2	Japan	3	1	2	0	5	1	+4	5	Knockout stage and 2019 FIFA Women's World Cup
3	South Korea	3	1	2	0	4	0	+4	5	2019 FIFA Women's World Cup playoff
4	Vietnam	3	0	0	3	0	16	−16	0	

Source: AFC
Rules for classification: Group stage tiebreakers
Notes:
7 April 2018
20:00

Australia	0–0	South Korea
	Report

King Abdullah II Stadium, Amman
Attendance: 230
Referee: Qin Liang (China)

10 April 2018
20:00

Vietnam	0–8	Australia
	Report	Simon 8'; Kennedy 18'; Logarzo 21'; Van Egmond 28'; Kerr 44', 51'; Nguyễn Thị Tuyết Dung 71' (o.g.); Raso 75'

Amman International Stadium, Amman
Attendance: 401
Referee: Edita Mirabidova (Uzbekistan)

13 April 2018
16:45

Japan	1–1	Australia
Mi. Sakaguchi 63'	Report	Kerr 86'

Amman International Stadium, Amman
Attendance: 446
Referee: Ri Hyang-ok (North Korea)

==== Semi-final ====
17 April 2018
16:45

Australia	2–2 (a.e.t.)	Thailand
Kanjanaporn 17' (o.g.); Kennedy 90+1'	Report	Kanjana 20'; Rattikan 63'
Penalties
Van Egmond (penalty missed); Kellond-Knight (penalty scored); De Vanna (penalty missed); Catley (penalty scored); Kerr (penalty scored)	3–1	(penalty scored) Ainon; (penalty missed) Sunisa; (penalty missed) Silawan; (penalty missed) Pitsamai

King Abdullah II Stadium, Amman
Attendance: 166
Referee: Edita Mirabidova (Uzbekistan)

==== Final ====
20 April 2018
20:00

Japan	1–0	Australia
Yokoyama 84'	Report

Amman International Stadium, Amman
Attendance: 3,065
Referee: Ri Hyang-ok (North Korea)

=== 2022 AFC Women's Asian Cup ===
==== Group stage ====
Pos	Team	Pld	W	D	L	GF	GA	GD	Pts	Qualification
1	Australia	3	3	0	0	24	1	+23	9	Knockout stage
2	Philippines	3	2	0	1	7	4	+3	6	Knockout stage
3	Thailand	3	1	0	2	5	3	+2	3	Knockout stage
4	Indonesia	3	0	0	3	0	28	−28	0	

Source: AFC
Rules for classification: Group stage tiebreakers
21 January 2022
15:30

Australia	18–0	Indonesia
Kerr 9', 11', 26' (pen.), 36', 54'; Foord 14'; Fowler 17'; Raso 24', 88'; Carpenter 34', 49'; Van Egmond 39' (pen.), 57', 69'; Yallop 59'; Simon 67', 71'; Luik 78'	Report (FIFA); Report (AFC)

Mumbai Football Arena, Mumbai
Attendance: 0
Referee: Mahsa Ghorbani (Iran)

24 January 2022
15:30

Philippines	0–4	Australia
	Report (FIFA); Report (AFC)	Kerr 51'; Randle 53' (o.g.); Van Egmond 67'; Fowler 87'

Mumbai Football Arena, Mumbai
Attendance: 0
Referee: Wang Chieh (Chinese Taipei)

27 January 2022
19:30

Australia	2–1	Thailand
Van Egmond 39'; Kerr 80'	Report (FIFA); Report (AFC)	Nipawan 90+3'

Mumbai Football Arena, Mumbai
Attendance: 0
Referee: Thein Thein Aye (Myanmar)

==== Quarter-final ====
30 January 2022
13:30

Australia	0–1	South Korea
	Report (FIFA); Report (AFC)	Ji So-yun 87'

Shiv Chhatrapati Sports Complex, Pune
Attendance: 0
Referee: Qin Liang (China PR)

=== 2026 AFC Women's Asian Cup ===
==== Group stage ====
Pos	Team	Pld	W	D	L	GF	GA	GD	Pts	Qualification
1	South Korea	3	2	1	0	9	3	+6	7	Advance to knockout stage
2	Australia (H)	3	2	1	0	8	3	+5	7	Advance to knockout stage
3	Philippines	3	1	0	2	2	4	−2	3	Advance to knockout stage
4	Iran	3	0	0	3	0	9	−9	0	

Source: AFC
(H) Hosts
1 March 2026
17:00 UTC+8

Australia	1–0	Philippines
Kerr 14'	Report (AFC); Report (FIFA)

Perth Stadium, Perth
Attendance: 44,379
Referee: Dong Fangyu (China)

5 March 2026
19:00 UTC+10

Iran	0–4	Australia
	Report (AFC); Report (FIFA)	Sayer 8'; Fowler 27'; Kennedy 35', 58'

Gold Coast Stadium, Gold Coast
Attendance: 22,398
Referee: Asaka Koizumi (Japan)

8 March 2026
20:00 UTC+11

Australia	3–3	South Korea
Kennedy 32', 90+8'; Kerr 45+6'	Report (AFC); Report (FIFA)	Mun Eun-ju 13'; Kim Shin-ji 53' (pen.); Kang Chae-rim 56'

Stadium Australia, Sydney
Attendance: 60,279
Referee: Yoshimi Yamashita (Japan)

==== Quarter-final ====
13 March 2026
18:00 UTC+8

Australia	2–1	North Korea
Kennedy 9'; Kerr 47'	Report (AFC); Report (FIFA)	Chae Un-yong 65'

Perth Rectangular Stadium, Perth
Attendance: 16,466
Referee: Veronika Bernatskaia (Kyrgyzstan)

==== Semi-final ====
17 March 2026
18:00 UTC+8

China	1–2	Australia
Zhang Linyan 26' (pen.)	Report (AFC); Report (FIFA)	Foord 17'; Kerr 58'

Perth Stadium, Perth
Attendance: 35,170
Referee: Supiree Testhomya (Thailand)

==== Final ====
21 March 2026
20:00 UTC+11

Japan	1–0	Australia
Hamano 17'	Report (AFC); Report (FIFA)

Stadium Australia, Sydney
Attendance: 74,397
Referee: Kim Yu-jeong (South Korea)

=== Goalscorers ===
Player	Goals	2006	2008	2010	2014	2018	2022	2026
Samantha Kerr	16			2		3	7	4
Lisa De Vanna	7	3	2	1	1			
Alanna Kennedy	7					2		5
Emily Van Egmond	6					1	5	
Own goal	5	1			1	2	1	
Kate Gill	4	1		1	2			
Caitlin Munoz	3	3						
Katrina Gorry	3				3			
Caitlin Foord	3				1		1	1
Hayley Raso	3					1	2	
Kyah Simon	3					1	2	
Mary Fowler	3						2	1
Joanne Peters	2	2						
Sarah Walsh	2	2						
Heather Garriock	2		2					
Ellie Carpenter	2						2	
Alicia Ferguson	1	1						
Joanne Burgess	1	1						
Sally Shipard	1	1						
Clare Polkinghorne	1		1					
Ellyse Perry	1		1					
Jenna Tristram	1		1					
Kim Carroll	1			1				
Kylie Ledbrook	1			1				
Leena Khamis	1			1				
Elise Kellond-Knight	1				1			
Chloe Logarzo	1					1		
Aivi Luik	1						1	
Tameka Yallop	1						1	
Amy Sayer	1							1
Total	85	15	7	7	9	11	24	12

== See also ==
- Australia men's national soccer team all-time record
- Australia at the FIFA Women's World Cup
