= Ultras Malaya =

Association Football Supporters

- Abbreviation: UM'07
- Nickname: Harimau Malaya
- Formation: 2007; 19 years ago
- Type: Association football culture, Ultras
- Headquarters: Bukit Jalil Stadium
- Location: Malaysia
- Members: More than 50,000
- Football Association: Malaysia
- Capo (Leader): (Malaysia) Mohd Ridzuan as "Lekir" Haji Ahmad
- Subsidiaries: North Borneo Ultras; Ultras Nogori 9; Ultras Panthers; Ultras Taming Sari; Ultras Tranung; Ultras Kedah; The Supporters; Gate H Boys; Kuala Lumpur Utras; UltraSel Curva; Elephant Army; Brigate Gialloblu Perlis
- Website: ultrasmalaya.com Facebook; Instagram; X

The Ultras Malaya are football supporters associated with Malaysia national team. The Ultras Malaya first appeared in 2007 during the campaign of 2007 AFC Asian Cup.

Ultras Malaya is the largest supporter club in Malaysia dedicated to the Malaysia national team. The Ultras Malaya has many members from different ethnic backgrounds, states, clubs and also consisting of 14 states and other subdivisions ultras in Malaysia.

Their main rivals are the fans of Indonesia, where this rival was called as Nusantara derby and there have been a number of violent clashes before, during and after the derby between the two nations.

== History ==
Ultras Malaya also known as UM'07 originally formed by a group of Malaysian supporters including (Freddy, Black and Sky—founding members) during the 14th edition of AFC Asian Cup in 2007. The idea of this establishment was sparked in their online discussion, harimaumalaydotcom after the poor performance shown by the national team.

The culmination of the establishment of this team was when the Malaysian football team won their first title of the SEA games against Vietnam, winning the game 1–0 and the 2010 AFF Suzuki Cup competition as they claimed a 4-2 aggregate win over fierce rivals Indonesia to be the winner for the first and only time so far.

The well known and popular chants among the supporters is Warisan sung by the singer Sudirman Arshad. It used to be sung by the supporter during the early game as the "word of spirits" for the players to play their full performance.

Criticism and tension occurred when Malaysia failed to qualify for the 2018 FIFA World Cup qualification at the Shah Alam Stadium in 2015. The Ultras Malaya had provoked FAM by burning flares and firecrackers were thrown onto the field, as Malaysia trailed 1-2 behind Saudi Arabian in the stadium and caused FAM to be subject to disciplinary action from FIFA.

Ultras Malaya supporters burned flares during the international friendly match between Malaysia and the Philippines at the Selayang Municipal Council Stadium in March 2014, causing the Asian Football Confederation (AFC) to fine the Football Association of Malaysia (FAM) US$10,000 for aspects of security negligence. Before that, FAM was fined as much as US$35,000 because of the supporters' problems during the first semi-final meeting of the 2014 AFF Suzuki Cup Football Championship between Malaysia and Vietnam at Bukit Jalil National Stadium, 7 Dec 2014.

== Ultras Members ==
Ultras Malaya members began to increase slowly from year to year until its peak in the AFF Suzuki Cup 2014, in which membership had reached tens of thousands. UM07 membership has grown over time with the establishment of subdivisions at state and club level. The main ultras and supporters by states including:

Clubs	Supporters Name	League	Date of Formation
Perak FC	Silver State Ultras / The Supporters	Dissolved	19 Apr 2009
Perak FA	Silver State Ultras / The Supporters	Malaysia A1 Semi-Pro League	19 Apr 2009
Kedah Darul Aman	Ultras Kedah 09	Malaysia A1 Semi-Pro League	29 Dec 2009
Sri Pahang	Elephant Army	Dissolved	3 Feb 2010
Selangor	UltraSel Curva	Malaysia Super League	17 Mar 2010
Negeri Sembilan	Ultras Nogori 9	Malaysia Super League	15 May 2010
Kelantan	Gate H Boys	Dissolved	14 Dec 2010
Kelantan Red Warrior	Gate H Boys	Malaysia A1 Semi-Pro League	14 Dec 2010
(Malacca) Melaka United	Ultras Taming Sari	Dissolved	11 Jan 2011
Terengganu	Ultras Tranung	Malaysia Super League	16 Jan 2011
Perlis FA	Brigate Gialloblu Perlis	Dissolved	2 Feb 2011
Perlis GSA	Brigate Gialloblu Perlis	Malaysia A1 Semi-Pro League	2 Feb 2011
Kuala Lumpur City	Kuala Lumpur Ultras / Cityboys	Malaysia Super League	28 Feb 2011
Sabah	North Borneo Ultras	Malaysia Super League	5 Apr 2011
Penang	Ultras Panthers	Malaysia Super League	1 Dec 2011

In terms of the Ultras Malaya supporters, Capo was a leader to lead the chanting inside the stadium. The well-known former Capo of Ultras Malaya is Mohd Ridzuan Ahmad (also known as Lekir Haji Ahmad).

== See also ==
- Ultras
- List of hooligan firms
- List of football clubs in Malaysia
- Malaysia national football team
- Football Association of Malaysia
- AFF Championship
- AFC Asian Cup
- Indonesia–Malaysia football rivalry
