= Indonesia–Malaysia football rivalry =

Asian association football rivalry

- Locations of Indonesia (green) and Malaysia (orange) on the world map.
- Other names: Nusantara derby
- Location: Southeast Asia
- Teams: Indonesia; Malaysia
- First meeting: 7 September 1957; Merdeka Tournament; Malaya 2–4 Indonesia
- Latest meeting: 28 September 2026; FIFA ASEAN Cup; Malaysia 0–0 Indonesia

Statistics
- Total meetings: 79
- Most wins: Indonesia (36)
- Most player appearances: (Malaysia) Soh Chin Ann (26)
- Top scorer: (Indonesia) Abdul Kadir (16)
- All-time series: Indonesia: 36; Drawn: 19; Malaysia: 24
- Largest victory: Malaysia 7–1 Indonesia (14 August 1976); Indonesia 6–0 Malaysia (6 August 1999)

The Indonesia–Malaysia football rivalry is a sports rivalry primarily between the men's national association football teams of the two countries. It is one of Asia's best known football rivalries. The heated political conflict between the two countries in the 1960s transmitted disease to the football field. The infamous "Ganyang Malaysia!" chant put forward by Indonesia's "Father of the Nation" and first president Sukarno in a 1963 political speech in Jakarta is considered an encouragement for the Indonesian team before matches against Malaysia. Matches involving the two countries, whether in Jakarta or Kuala Lumpur, are always crowded with spectators. When the match takes place, there are often controversial incidents, like when two fans died in a stampede during the 2011 Southeast Asian Games final between the under-23 teams of Indonesia and Malaysia in Jakarta.

The two teams most recently met in the 2026 FIFA ASEAN Cup, with the match ended 0–0.

== Men's football records ==
=== Matches ===
Only matches from senior teams are included.

#	Date	Team 1	Result	Team 2	Location	Tournament
1	7 September 1957	Malaya	2–4	Indonesia	Kuala Lumpur	1957 Merdeka Tournament
2	3 July 1958	Malaya	2–4	Indonesia	Singapore	Friendly
3	30 August 1958	Malaya	3–2	Indonesia	Kuala Lumpur	1958 Merdeka Tournament
4	20 April 1960	Indonesia	5–0	Malaya	Surakarta	Friendly
5	13 August 1961	Malaya	1–2	Indonesia	Kuala Lumpur	1961 Merdeka Tournament
6	23 October 1961	Malaya	3–1	Indonesia	Saigon	1961 South Vietnam Independence Cup
7	28 August 1962	Indonesia	2–3	Malaya	Jakarta	1962 Asian Games
8	28 October 1962	Indonesia	2–1	Malaya	Saigon	1962 South Vietnam Independence Cup
9	21 November 1968	Indonesia	1–0	Malaysia	Bangkok	1968 King's Cup
10	28 November 1968	Indonesia	6–1	Malaysia	Bangkok	1968 King's Cup
11	1969	Malaysia	1–3	Indonesia	Kuala Lumpur	1969 Merdeka Tournament
12	9 November 1969	Malaysia	2–3	Indonesia	Kuala Lumpur	1969 Merdeka Tournament
13	15 August 1970	Malaysia	4–0	Indonesia	Kuala Lumpur	1970 Merdeka Tournament
14	1 November 1970	Malaysia	3–1	Indonesia	Saigon	1970 South Vietnam Independence Cup
15	13 November 1970	Indonesia	3–0	Malaysia	Bangkok	1970 King's Cup
16	20 November 1970	Indonesia	0–3	Malaysia	Bangkok	1970 King's Cup
17	13 May 1971	Indonesia	4–2	Malaysia	Seoul	1971 President's Cup
18	1 June 1971	Indonesia	0–3	Malaysia	Bangkok	1972 AFC Asian Cup qualification
19	14 June 1971	Indonesia	2–1	Malaysia	Jakarta	1971 Jakarta Anniversary Tournament
20	10 November 1971	Indonesia	2–0	Malaysia	Bangkok	1971 King's Cup
21	13 June 1972	Indonesia	3–0	Malaysia	Jakarta	1972 Jakarta Anniversary Tournament
22	27 September 1972	Indonesia	3–1	Malaysia	South Korea	1972 President's Cup
23	14 June 1973	Indonesia	2–0	Malaysia	Jakarta	1973 Jakarta Anniversary Tournament
24	7 June 1974	Indonesia	4–3	Malaysia	Jakarta	1974 Jakarta Anniversary Tournament
25	20 March 1975	Indonesia	0–0	Malaysia	Bangkok	1976 AFC Asian Cup qualification
26	14 June 1975	Indonesia	3–1	Malaysia	Jakarta	1975 Jakarta Anniversary Tournament
27	14 August 1975	Malaysia	2–1	Indonesia	Kuala Lumpur	1975 Merdeka Tournament
28	24 February 1976	Indonesia	2–1	Malaysia	Jakarta	1976 Summer Olympics qualification
29	1 June 1976	Indonesia	1–2	Malaysia	Jakarta	1976 Jakarta Anniversary Tournament
30	14 August 1976	Malaysia	7–1	Indonesia	Kuala Lumpur	1976 Merdeka Tournament
31	3 March 1977	Indonesia	0–0	Malaysia	Singapore	1978 FIFA World Cup qualification
32	19 November 1977	Malaysia	1–2	Indonesia	Kuala Lumpur	1977 Southeast Asian Games
33	13 June 1978	Indonesia	3–0	Malaysia	Jakarta	1978 Jakarta Anniversary Tournament
34	19 July 1978	Malaysia	1–0	Indonesia	Kuala Lumpur	1978 Merdeka Tournament
35	5 May 1979	Indonesia	1–4	Malaysia	Bangkok	1980 AFC Asian Cup qualification
36	2 July 1979	Malaysia	1–1	Indonesia	Kuala Lumpur	1979 Merdeka Tournament
37	26 September 1979	Indonesia	0–0	Malaysia	Jakarta	1979 Southeast Asian Games
38	30 September 1979	Indonesia	0–1	Malaysia	Jakarta	1979 Southeast Asian Games
39	21 March 1980	Malaysia	6–1	Indonesia	Kuala Lumpur	1980 Summer Olympics qualification
40	31 August 1980	Indonesia	1–1	Malaysia	Busan	1980 President's Cup
41	27 October 1980	Malaysia	1–1	Indonesia	Kuala Lumpur	1980 Merdeka Tournament
42	9 September 1981	Indonesia	0–2	Malaysia	Kuala Lumpur	1981 Merdeka Tournament
43	17 November 1981	Indonesia	0–0	Malaysia	Bangkok	1981 King's Cup
44	5 August 1982	Malaysia	0–2	Indonesia	Kuala Lumpur	1982 Merdeka Tournament
45	17 October 1982	Indonesia	0–0 (4–3 p)	Malaysia	Singapore	1982 Merlion Cup
46	16 October 1983	Indonesia	1–1	Malaysia	Singapore	1984 Summer Olympics qualification
47	28 October 1983	Malaysia	2–0	Indonesia	Kuala Lumpur	1984 Summer Olympics qualification
48	26 August 1984	Malaysia	2–2	Indonesia	Kuala Lumpur	1984 Merdeka Tournament
49	16 December 1985	Indonesia	0–1	Malaysia	Bangkok	1985 Southeast Asian Games
50	27 September 1986	Indonesia	1–0	Malaysia	Seoul	1986 Asian Games
51	20 September 1987	Indonesia	1–0	Malaysia	Jakarta	1987 Southeast Asian Games
52	8 December 1988	Indonesia	0–0	Malaysia	Kuala Lumpur	1988 Merdeka Tournament
53	5 February 1989	Malaysia	3–1	Indonesia	Bangkok	1989 King's Cup
54	6 February 1991	Malaysia	1–2	Indonesia	Kuala Lumpur	1991 Merdeka Tournament
55	26 November 1991	Indonesia	2–0	Malaysia	Manila	1991 Southeast Asian Games
56	8 August 1992	Indonesia	1–1	Malaysia	Jakarta	1992 Indonesia Independence Cup
57	24 April 1992	Indonesia	1–1	Malaysia	Singapore	1992 AFC Asian Cup qualification
58	8 December 1995	Indonesia	3–0	Malaysia	Bangkok	1995 Southeast Asian Games
59	2 March 1996	Malaysia	0–0	Indonesia	Kuala Lumpur	1996 AFC Asian Cup qualification
60	13 September 1996	Indonesia	1–3	Malaysia	Singapore	1996 AFF Championship
61	9 October 1997	Indonesia	4–0	Malaysia	Jakarta	1997 Southeast Asian Games
62	2 August 1999	Indonesia	6–0	Malaysia	Bandar Seri Begawan	1999 Southeast Asian Games
63	27 December 2002	Malaysia	0–1	Indonesia	Jakarta	2002 AFF Championship
64	26 August 2003	Malaysia	1–1	Indonesia	Kuala Lumpur	Friendly
65	17 March 2004	Malaysia	0–0	Indonesia	Johor Bahru	Friendly
66	28 December 2004	Indonesia	1–2	Malaysia	Jakarta	2004 AFF Championship
67	3 January 2005	Malaysia	1–4	Indonesia	Kuala Lumpur	2004 AFF Championship
68	23 August 2006	Malaysia	1–1	Indonesia	Kuala Lumpur	2006 Merdeka Tournament
69	6 June 2008	Indonesia	1–1	Malaysia	Surabaya	Friendly
70	1 December 2010	Indonesia	5–1	Malaysia	Jakarta	2010 AFF Championship
71	26 December 2010	Malaysia	3–0	Indonesia	Kuala Lumpur	2010 AFF Championship
72	29 December 2010	Indonesia	2–1	Malaysia	Jakarta	2010 AFF Championship
73	1 December 2012	Malaysia	2–0	Indonesia	Kuala Lumpur	2012 AFF Championship
74	14 September 2014	Indonesia	2–0	Malaysia	Sidoarjo	Friendly
75	6 September 2016	Indonesia	3–0	Malaysia	Surakarta	Friendly
76	5 September 2019	Indonesia	2–3	Malaysia	Jakarta	2022 FIFA World Cup qualification
77	19 November 2019	Malaysia	2–0	Indonesia	Kuala Lumpur	2022 FIFA World Cup qualification
78	19 December 2021	Malaysia	1–4	Indonesia	Singapore	2020 AFF Championship
79	28 September 2026	Malaysia	0–0	Indonesia	Jakarta	2026 FIFA ASEAN Cup

=== Overall record ===
Indonesia wins	36
Draws	19
Malaysia wins	24
Indonesia goals	132
Malaysia goals	102
Total matches	79

=== Honours ===
Indonesia	Competition	Malaysia
1	FIFA ASEAN Cup	—
—	AFF Championship	1
2	SEA Games (until 1999)	4
—	AFC Asian Cup	—
—	Asian Games (until 1998)	—
—	FIFA World Cup	—
—	Summer Olympics (until 1988)	—
3	Total	5

== Women's football records ==
#	Date	Team 1	Result	Team 2	Location	Tournament
1	23 March 1982	Indonesia	3–2	Malaysia	Bangkok, Thailand	1982 ASEAN Women's Championship
2	11 February 1985	Indonesia	3–0	Malaysia	Kuala Lumpur, Malaysia	1985 ASEAN Women's Championship
3	1997	Indonesia	1–1	Malaysia	Jakarta, Indonesia	1997 SEA Games
4	2 November 2003	Malaysia	3–1	Indonesia	Kuala Lumpur, Malaysia	2003 Women Four Nations Tournament
5	6 December 2003	Indonesia	2–2	Malaysia	Hải Phòng, Vietnam	2003 SEA Games
6	7 September 2007	Malaysia	2–0	Indonesia	Yangon, Myanmar	2007 AFF Women's Championship
7	16 October 2008	Indonesia	3–0	Malaysia	Hồ Chí Minh City, Vietnam	2008 AFF Women's Championship
8	6 July 2022	Indonesia	1–1	Malaysia	Biñan, Philippines	2022 AFF Women's Championship
9	26 November 2024	Malaysia	0–1	Indonesia	Vientiane, Laos	2024 ASEAN Women's Cup

=== Overall record ===
Indonesia wins	4
Draws	3
Malaysia wins	2
Indonesia goals	15
Malaysia goals	11
Total matches	9

=== Honours ===
Indonesia	Competition	Malaysia
—	ASEAN Women's Championship	—
2	AFF Women's Cup	—
—	SEA Games	—
—	AFC Women's Asian Cup	—
—	Asian Games	—
—	FIFA Women's World Cup	—
—	Summer Olympics	—
2	Total	0

== See also ==
- Indonesia–Malaysia relations
- Australia–Indonesia football rivalry
- Indonesia–Singapore football rivalry
- Indonesia–Vietnam football rivalry
