= Australia–South Korea football rivalry =

International football rivalry

- Other names: Socceroos vs Taegeuk Warriors
- Location: Asia (AFC)
- Teams: Australia; South Korea
- First meeting: 14 November 1967; South Vietnam Independence Cup; South Korea 2–3 Australia
- Latest meeting: 2 February 2024; AFC Asian Cup; Australia 1–2 South Korea

Statistics
- Total meetings: 29
- Top scorer: Ray Baartz (3)
- All-time series: Australia: 9 South Korea: 9 Draw: 11

The Australia–South Korea football rivalry is a sports rivalry that exists between the national association football teams of both Australia and South Korea. The rivalry is one of the most followed competitive rivalries in Asian football.

== Historical origin ==
South Korea first faced Australia in 1967 during a tour to South Vietnam playing a game in the 1967 South Vietnam Independence Cup. In this encounter, Australia beat South Korea 3–2 before eventually winning the friendly tournament. It was this friendly competition that the nickname of the Australian side, "Socceroos", was born.

Just two years later they met in the first round of qualification for the 1970 FIFA World Cup in a group that included Japan. All the games were played in South Korea and Australia topped the group progressing to the next round before losing to Israel.

The two teams were to meet again in the final round of the 1974 World Cup qualifiers in late 1973 and on this occasion, the winner would progress to the 1974 FIFA World Cup. The teams first met in Sydney on 28 October 1973 and played out a nil-all draw. The second leg was in Seoul on 10 November 1973. South Korea scored early in the 15th minute and then again in the 27th minute. However, Australia were to quickly reply with a goal by Branko Buljevic just two minutes later. Shortly after half time, Ray Baartz equalised. The score remained two-all at full time. As this was prior to the introduction of the away goals rule a third match was hastily arranged and, just three days later they met in Hong Kong. Jimmy Mackay scored the only goal of the match resulting in Australia qualifying for their first World Cup Finals.

In 1977 they were to meet again in a five team group for qualification to the 1978 FIFA World Cup. Australia won one and drew one, although neither were to proceed.

When South Korea won a penalty shoot-out on 21 June 1987 in the President's Cup it was the first time that the Koreans had defeated Australia although it wasn't until 6 September 1990 in a friendly in Seoul that South Korea had won during regulation time. It was the 14th meeting between the two countries.

During the 1990s they played a number of friendly matches and then met in the 2001 FIFA Confederations Cup which was hosted in Korea. South Korea won the match 1–0 which gave them their first competitive victory over Australia although South Korea would not qualify to the knockout stage whereas Australia would. After Australia entered the Asian Football Confederation in 2006 the two teams had to wait until the 2011 AFC Asian Cup before they met again in a competitive fixture. On this occasion the match finished 1–1 in the group stage in Qatar.

They were to be drawn again in the same group when Australia hosted the 2015 AFC Asian Cup with Korea inflicting Australia's only defeat in the tournament, 1–0 in Brisbane, which was also South Korea's first ever win against Australia in Australia. However, Australia won a dramatic final in extra time in Sydney in front of a crowd of 76,385. Massimo Luongo scored just prior to half time. In second half injury time Son Heung-min equalised for the Koreans taking the match into extra time. James Troisi then scored the winner for Australia to claim their first Asian Cup.

Australia and South Korea are two of only five Asian national teams to have reached the knockout stage of the FIFA World Cup. Likewise, they are also two countries to have won the AFC Asian Cup. Both Australia and South Korea are also successful in other major competitions: Australia was one of only three AFC teams to have reached the final of a senior FIFA competition, in 1997 FIFA Confederations Cup; while Australia and South Korea's youth teams were also finalists in FIFA U-17 World Cup and FIFA U-20 World Cup.

== Matches ==
#	Date	Competition	Home team	Score	Away team	Home scorers	Away scorers	Venue
1	14 November 1967	1967 South Vietnam Independence Cup	Australia	3–2	South Korea	Billy Vojtek 26'; Attila Abonyi 52'; Johnny Warren 84'	See Young-keun 1'; Huh Yoon-jung 85'	(South Vietnam) Cong Hoa Stadium, Saigon
2	14 October 1969	1970 FIFA World Cup qualification	South Korea	1–2	Australia	Lee Yi-woo 44'	Johnny Watkiss 37'; Tommy McColl 78'	(South Korea) Dongdaemun Stadium, Seoul
3	20 October 1969	1970 FIFA World Cup qualification	South Korea	1–1	Australia	Park So-il 29'	Ray Baartz 59'	(South Korea) Dongdaemun Stadium, Seoul
4	22 October 1972	International friendly	South Korea	1–1	Australia	Lee Cha-man 65'	Max Tolson 12'	(South Korea) Dongdaemun Stadium, Seoul
5	24 October 1972	International friendly	South Korea	0–2	Australia		Ray Baartz 12'; Jim Armstrong 42'	(South Korea) Dongdaemun Stadium, Seoul
6	28 October 1973	1974 FIFA World Cup qualification	Australia	0–0	South Korea			(Australia) Sydney Sports Ground, Sydney
7	11 November 1973	1974 FIFA World Cup qualification	South Korea	2–2	Australia	Kim Jae-han 15'; Ko Jae-wook 27'	Branko Buljevic 29'; Ray Baartz 48'	(South Korea) Dongdaemun Stadium, Seoul
8	13 November 1973	1974 FIFA World Cup qualification	Australia	1–0	South Korea	Jimmy Mackay 70'		Hong Kong Stadium, Hong Kong
9	28 August 1977	1978 FIFA World Cup qualification	Australia	2–1	South Korea	John Kosmina 63', 75'	Cha Bum-kun 23'	(Australia) Sydney Sports Ground, Sydney
10	23 October 1977	1978 FIFA World Cup qualification	South Korea	0–0	Australia			(South Korea) Dongdaemun Stadium, Seoul
11	21 June 1987	1987 Korea Cup	South Korea	1–1 (a.e.t.) (5–4 p)	Australia	Kim Pan-keun 72'	Graham Arnold 83'	(South Korea) Seoul Olympic Stadium, Seoul
12	6 September 1990	International friendly	South Korea	1–0	Australia	Byun Byung-joo 70'		(South Korea) Dongdaemun Stadium, Seoul
13	9 September 1990	International friendly	South Korea	1–0	Australia	Seo Jung-won 70'		(South Korea) Kudok Stadium, Busan
14	14 June 1991	1991 Korea Cup	South Korea	0–0 (a.e.t.) (4–3 p)	Australia			(South Korea) Dongdaemun Stadium, Seoul
15	24 September 1993	International friendly	South Korea	1–1	Australia	Seo Jung-won 38'	Damian Mori 80'	(South Korea) Dongdaemun Stadium, Seoul
16	26 September 1993	International friendly	South Korea	1–0	Australia	Lee Ki-bum 76'		(South Korea) Dongdaemun Stadium, Seoul
17	22 January 1997	International friendly	Australia	2–1	South Korea	Matthew Bingley 37'; Alistair Edwards 72'	Ha Seok-ju 76'	(Australia) Suncorp Stadium, Brisbane
18	11 February 1998	International friendly	Australia	1–0	South Korea	Ernie Tapai 39'		(Australia) Sydney Football Stadium, Sydney
19	7 October 2000	2000 LG Cup	South Korea	4–2	Australia	Sim Jae-won 44'; Noh Jung-yoon 48'; Seol Ki-hyeon 65'; Lee Dong-gook 90+2' (pen.)	Paul Agostino 30', 35'	(United Arab Emirates) National Stadium, Dubai
20	6 June 2001	2001 FIFA Confederations Cup	South Korea	1–0	Australia	Hwang Sun-hong 24'		(South Korea) Suwon World Cup Stadium, Suwon
21	5 September 2009	International friendly	South Korea	3–1	Australia	Park Chu-young 5'; Lee Jung-soo 21'; Seol Ki-hyeon 87'	Patrick Kisnorbo 33'	(South Korea) Seoul World Cup Stadium, Seoul
22	14 January 2011	2011 AFC Asian Cup	Australia	1–1	South Korea	Mile Jedinak 62'	Koo Ja-cheol 24'	(Qatar) Al Gharafa Stadium, Doha
23	14 November 2012	International friendly	South Korea	1–2	Australia	Lee Dong-gook 11'	Nikita Rukavytsya 43'; Robert Cornthwaite 87'	(South Korea) Hwaseong Stadium, Hwaseong
24	20 July 2013	2013 EAFF Championship	South Korea	0–0	Australia			(South Korea) Seoul World Cup Stadium, Seoul
25	17 January 2015	2015 AFC Asian Cup	Australia	0–1	South Korea		Lee Jeong-hyeop 33'	(Australia) Suncorp Stadium, Brisbane
26	31 January 2015	2015 AFC Asian Cup	Australia	2–1 (a.e.t.)	South Korea	Massimo Luongo 45'; James Troisi 105'	Son Heung-min 90+1'	Stadium Australia, Sydney
27	17 November 2018	International friendly	Australia	1–1	South Korea	Massimo Luongo 90+4'	Hwang Ui-jo 22'	(Australia) Suncorp Stadium, Brisbane
28	7 June 2019	International friendly	South Korea	1–0	Australia	Hwang Ui-jo 76'		(South Korea) Busan Asiad Main Stadium, Busan
29	2 February 2024	2023 AFC Asian Cup	Australia	1–2 (a.e.t.)	South Korea	Craig Goodwin 42'	Hwang Hee-chan 90+6' (pen.); Son Heung-min 104'	(Qatar) Al Janoub Stadium, Al Wakrah

The following fixtures are considered 'A' Internationals by Football Australia only and are included in Australia's official statistics with regard to matches played, caps, records etc.

Date	Competition	Home team	Score	Away team	Home scorers	Away scorers	Venue
17 October 1982	1982 Merlion Cup	Australia	3–2	South Korea B	Phil O'Connor 10'; Dave Mitchell 31'; George Christopoulos 61'	Oh Suk-tae 59'; Park Chang-sun 83'	Singapore
15 December 1983	1983 Merlion Cup	Australia	3–1	South Korea B	John Kosmina 17'; Phil O'Connor 58'; Jimmy Cant 74'	Lee Hyun-chul 37'	Singapore

== Statistics ==
=== Head-to-head record ===
As of 2 February 2024

Venue	Australia wins	South Korea wins	Draws	Australia goals	South Korea goals
At Australia home	4	1	2	8	5
At South Korea home	3	6	8	13	16
At neutral venue	2	2	1	8	9
Total	9	9	11	29	30

=== Top goalscorers ===
As of 2 February 2024

Rank	Player	Goals
1	(Australia) Ray Baartz	3
2	(Australia) Paul Agostino	2
2	(South Korea) Hwang Ui-jo	2
2	(Australia) John Kosmina	2
2	(South Korea) Lee Dong-gook	2
2	(Australia) Massimo Luongo	2
2	(South Korea) Seo Jung-won	2
2	(South Korea) Seol Ki-hyeon	2
2	(South Korea) Son Heung-min	2

== See also ==
- Australia men's national soccer team all-time record
- South Korea national football team records and statistics
- Australia–South Korea relations
