= Australia men's national soccer team all-time record =

The lists shown below shows the Australia men's national soccer team all-time record against opposing nations. The statistics are composed of FIFA World Cup, FIFA Confederations Cup, OFC Nations Cup, AFC Asian Cup and Summer Olympics matches, as well as numerous international friendly tournaments and matches.

Only "A" internationals are included. Although there is some conjecture regarding the status of a number of games, the table includes all fixtures recognised by Football Australia as "A" internationals and as such is used to recognise caps, goal scorers, captaincy records, etc.

== Head-to-head record ==
Last match updated on 17 November 2026 vs. Jordan

Key
Positive balance (more Wins)
Neutral balance (Wins = Losses)
Negative balance (more Losses)

Opponent	Confederation	P	W	D	L	GF	GA	Win %	First match	Last match
American Samoa	OFC	1	1	0	0	31	0	100.00	11 April 2001	
Argentina	CONMEBOL	9	1	1	7	8	16	11.11	14 July 1988	15 June 2023
Bahrain	AFC	8	6	1	1	13	4	75.00	22 February 2006	19 November 2024
Bangladesh	AFC	4	4	0	0	18	0	100.00	3 September 2015	6 June 2024
Belgium	UEFA	1	0	0	1	0	2	0.00	4 September 2014	
Brazil	CONMEBOL	11	1	2	8	4	29	9.09	7 July 1988	29 September 2026
Bulgaria	UEFA	4	0	2	2	4	8	0.00	14 February 1973	15 February 2000
Cambodia	AFC	1	0	1	0	0	0	0.00	26 November 1965	
Cameroon	CAF	2	1	1	0	2	1	50.00	22 June 2017	27 March 2026
Canada	CONCACAF	10	6	1	3	16	11	60.00	7 June 1924	10 October 2025
Chile	CONMEBOL	6	0	2	4	3	10	0.00	22 June 1974	25 June 2017
China	AFC	15	9	2	4	27	12	60.00	6 August 1975	25 March 2025
Chinese Taipei	AFC	15	14	1	0	60	8	93.33	3 December 1965	7 June 2021
Colombia	CONMEBOL	5	0	2	3	2	7	0.00	8 February 1995	18 November 2025
Cook Islands	OFC	2	2	0	0	33	0	100.00	28 September 1998	19 June 2000
Costa Rica	CONCACAF	1	1	0	0	1	0	100.00	19 November 2013	
Croatia	UEFA	6	2	2	2	6	11	33.33	5 July 1992	6 June 2014
Curaçao	CONCACAF	1	1	0	0	5	1	100.00	31 March 2026	
Czech Republic^{1}	UEFA	10	1	2	7	8	22	10.00	27 January 1980	1 June 2018
Denmark	UEFA	5	2	1	2	4	6	40.00	6 February 2007	30 November 2022
East Germany	UEFA	1	0	0	1	0	2	0.00	14 June 1974	
Ecuador	CONMEBOL	3	1	0	2	7	7	33.33	5 March 2014	28 March 2023
Egypt	CAF	3	0	2	1	1	5	0.00	19 June 1987	3 July 2026
England	UEFA	8	1	2	5	6	9	12.50	31 May 1980	13 October 2023
Fiji	OFC	9	7	0	2	38	6	77.78	19 March 1977	2 June 2004
France	UEFA	6	1	1	4	4	14	16.67	26 May 1994	22 November 2022
Germany^{2}	UEFA	6	1	1	4	9	17	16.67	18 June 1974	19 June 2017
Ghana	CAF	7	4	2	1	8	4	57.14	18 June 1995	19 June 2010
Greece	UEFA	11	4	3	4	14	14	36.36	20 July 1969	7 June 2016
Guam	AFC	1	1	0	0	9	0	100.00	7 December 2012	
Honduras	CONCACAF	2	1	1	0	3	1	50.00	10 November 2017	15 November 2017
Hong Kong	AFC	8	5	0	3	13	5	62.50	29 November 1965	9 December 2012
Hungary	UEFA	3	3	0	0	8	2	100.00	2 April 1997	9 June 2018
India	AFC	9	5	1	3	27	27	55.56	3 September 1938	13 January 2024
Indonesia	AFC	18	13	4	1	41	7	72.22	17 November 1967	20 March 2025
Iran (Note: On 4 November 1970, Iran played against Australia in a friendly, which Australia won 2–1 in Tehran. However, accounts of the match differ between Iran and Australia. Iran considered it an unofficial friendly between Persepolis against Australia, whereas Australia considered it an A level friendly match. With regard to the article's position, the match was considered official in Australia.)	AFC	7	2	2	3	8	8	28.57	4 November 1970	29 November 1997
Iraq	AFC	11	7	2	2	14	8	63.64	11 March 1973	23 March 2017
Israel	UEFA	17	5	9	3	18	16	29.41	4 December 1969	16 April 1989
Italy	UEFA	1	0	0	1	0	1	0.00	26 June 2006	
Jamaica	CONCACAF	2	2	0	0	7	1	100.00	7 September 2003	9 October 2005
Japan	AFC	29	8	10	11	34	40	27.59	27 November 1956	5 June 2025
Jordan	AFC	9	5	0	4	14	9	55.56	11 September 2012	17 November 2026
Kenya	CAF	1	1	0	0	4	0	100.00	21 September 1996	
Kuwait	AFC	14	7	2	5	22	12	50.00	16 October 1977	3 June 2021
Kyrgyzstan	AFC	2	2	0	0	5	1	100.00	16 June 2015	12 November 2015
Lebanon	AFC	4	4	0	0	13	0	100.00	6 September 2012	26 March 2024
Liechtenstein	UEFA	1	1	0	0	3	1	100.00	7 June 2006	
Malaysia	AFC	7	6	0	1	19	1	85.71	7 December 1965	7 October 2011
Mexico	CONCACAF	7	2	3	2	10	10	28.57	1 December 1970	30 May 2026
Morocco	CAF	1	1	0	0	1	0	100.00	9 June 1987	
Nepal	AFC	2	2	0	0	8	0	100.00	10 October 2019	11 June 2021
Netherlands	UEFA	4	1	2	1	5	5	25.00	4 June 2006	18 June 2014
New Caledonia	OFC	1	1	0	0	11	0	100.00	8 July 2002	
New Zealand	OFC	69	45	11	13	164	71	65.22	17 June 1922	9 September 2025
Nigeria	CAF	2	2	0	0	2	0	100.00	22 September 1988	17 November 2007
North Korea	AFC	3	0	1	2	3	10	0.00	21 November 1965	5 December 2012
North Macedonia	UEFA	2	1	1	0	1	0	50.00	12 March 1997	30 March 2015
Northern Ireland	UEFA	3	0	1	2	3	5	0.00	11 June 1980	18 June 1980
Norway	UEFA	3	1	1	1	4	6	33.33	25 January 1997	23 March 2018
Oman	AFC	11	6	4	1	23	8	54.55	8 July 2007	1 February 2022
Palestine	AFC	3	3	0	0	9	0	100.00	11 January 2019	11 June 2024
Papua New Guinea	OFC	1	1	0	0	11	2	100.00	26 February 1980	
Paraguay	CONMEBOL	6	2	4	0	4	2	33.33	9 June 2000	25 June 2026
Peru	CONMEBOL	2	0	1	1	0	2	0.00	26 June 2018	13 June 2022
Philippines	AFC	1	1	0	0	6	0	100.00	29 October 1972	
Poland	UEFA	1	1	0	0	2	1	100.00	7 September 2008	
Qatar	AFC	6	4	1	1	13	2	66.67	6 February 2008	13 November 2026
Republic of Ireland	UEFA	2	1	0	1	4	2	50.00	19 August 2003	12 August 2009
Romania	UEFA	1	0	0	1	2	3	0.00	6 February 2013	
Russia^{3}	UEFA	7	0	3	4	4	12	0.00	16 November 1975	25 September 1988
Samoa	OFC	1	1	0	0	11	0	100.00	16 April 2001	
Saudi Arabia	AFC	12	6	4	2	20	12	50.00	9 July 1988	10 June 2025
Scotland	UEFA	8	1	1	6	4	11	12.50	28 May 1967	15 August 2012
Serbia^{4}	UEFA	3	2	1	0	3	1	66.67	18 September 1988	7 June 2011
Singapore	AFC	7	6	1	0	21	4	85.71	11 November 1967	22 March 2008
Slovakia	UEFA	1	0	1	0	0	0	0.00	12 February 2000	
Slovenia	UEFA	1	0	0	1	0	2	0.00	11 August 2010	
Solomon Islands	OFC	10	9	1	0	55	8	90.00	4 September 1992	6 September 2005
South Africa	CAF	21	6	4	11	27	47	28.57	10 May 1947	26 May 2014
South Korea	AFC	31	11	11	9	35	33	35.48	14 November 1967	2 February 2024
Spain	UEFA	1	0	0	1	0	3	0.00	23 June 2014	
Sweden	UEFA	5	2	2	1	2	2	40.00	26 January 1992	28 February 1996
Switzerland	UEFA	2	0	2	0	1	1	0.00	3 September 2010	6 June 2026
Syria	AFC	4	3	1	0	7	4	75.00	5 October 2017	18 January 2024
Tahiti	OFC	9	9	0	0	38	2	100.00	11 September 1992	31 May 2004
Tajikistan	AFC	2	2	0	0	10	0	100.00	8 September 2015	24 March 2016
Thailand	AFC	7	6	1	0	17	4	85.71	6 October 1982	5 September 2017
Tonga	OFC	1	1	0	0	22	0	100.00	9 April 2001	
Tunisia	CAF	3	2	0	1	4	2	66.67	1 October 1997	26 November 2022
Turkey	UEFA	3	1	0	2	3	4	33.33	21 May 2004	13 June 2026
United Arab Emirates	AFC	7	4	2	1	7	2	57.14	5 January 2011	7 June 2022
United States	CONCACAF	5	1	1	3	3	7	20.00	13 June 1992	19 June 2026
Uruguay	CONMEBOL	9	4	1	4	6	8	44.44	25 April 1974	2 June 2007
Uzbekistan	AFC	5	3	2	0	10	1	60.00	10 September 2008	23 January 2024
Vanuatu	OFC	3	3	0	0	6	0	100.00	25 June 2000	4 June 2004
Venezuela	CONMEBOL	2	0	1	1	1	2	0.00	18 February 2004	14 November 2025
Vietnam^{5}	AFC	4	4	0	0	7	0	100.00	7 November 1967	27 January 2022
Wales	UEFA	1	1	0	0	2	1	100.00	10 August 2011	
Zimbabwe^{6}	CAF	5	3	2	0	13	3	60.00	14 August 1950	29 November 1969
Total (98)		628	315	135	178	1219	670	50%	17 June 1922	17 November 2026

- Australia–Indonesia football rivalry
- Australia–Japan football rivalry
- Australia–South Korea football rivalry
- Australia–New Zealand soccer rivalry

Notes:

^{1} includes Czechoslovakia
^{2} includes West Germany
^{3} includes Soviet Union
^{4} includes Yugoslavia
^{5} includes South Vietnam
^{6} includes Southern Rhodesia & Rhodesia

== Performances ==
=== Performance by competition ===
For performances by major tournaments refer to Competitive record

== Best results ==
The following table shows Australia's best results against opposition by confederation, Only "A" internationals are included.

=== AFC ===
Team	Best result	Venue	Date
Bahrain	Bahrain 1–3 Australia; Australia 2–0 Bahrain; Australia 2–0 Bahrain; Bahrain 0–2 Australia	(Bahrain) Manama (Australia) Sydney (Australia) Sydney (United Arab Emirates) Abu Dhabi	22 February 2006; 11 October 2006; 10 June 2009; 6 January 2024
Bangladesh	Australia 7–0 Bangladesh	(Australia) Melbourne	16 November 2023
Cambodia	Cambodia 0–0 Australia	(Cambodia) Phnom Penh	26 November 1965
China	Australia 3–0 China	(Australia) Brisbane (Qatar) Doha	27 September 1985; 2 September 2021
Chinese Taipei	Australia 8–0 Chinese Taipei	(Australia) Sydney; Hong Kong	27 October 1985; 9 December 2012
Guam	Guam 0–9 Australia	Hong Kong	7 December 2012
Hong Kong	Australia 3–0 Hong Kong; Hong Kong 2–5 Australia	(Australia) Adelaide; Hong Kong	10 July 1977; 30 October 1977
India	India 0–4 Australia	(Qatar) Doha	10 January 2011
Indonesia	Australia 6–0 Indonesia	(Australia) Sydney	24 March 1973
Iran	Australia 3–0 Iran	(Australia) Sydney	18 August 1973
Iraq	Australia 3–1 Iraq; Australia 2–0 Iraq	(Australia) Sydney (Australia) Perth	11 March 1973; 1 September 2016
Japan	Australia 3–0 Japan	(Australia) Melbourne	14 February 1996
Jordan	Australia 4–0 Jordan; Australia 5–1 Jordan	(Australia) Melbourne (Australia) Sydney	11 June 2013; 29 March 2016
Kuwait	Kuwait 0–4 Australia	Kuwait City	15 October 2018
Kyrgyzstan	Australia 3–0 Kyrgyzstan	(Australia) Canberra	12 November 2015
Lebanon	Australia 5–0 Lebanon	(Australia) Canberra	26 March 2024
Malaysia	Malaysia 0–5 Australia; Australia 5–0 Malaysia	Singapore (Australia) Canberra	15 October 1982; 7 October 2011
Nepal	Australia 5–0 Nepal	(Australia) Canberra	10 October 2019
North Korea	North Korea 1–1 Australia	Hong Kong	5 December 2012
Oman	Australia 5–0 Oman	(United Arab Emirates) Dubai	30 December 2018
Palestine	Australia 5–0 Palestine	(Australia) Perth	11 June 2024
Philippines	Philippines 0–6 Australia	(Philippines) Manila	29 October 1972
Qatar	Australia 4–0 Qatar	(Australia) Brisbane	15 October 2008
Saudi Arabia	Australia 3–0 Saudi Arabia	(Australia) Sydney	9 July 1988
Singapore	Singapore 1–6 Australia	Singapore	21 November 1967
South Korea	South Korea 0–2 Australia; South Korea 1–3 Australia	(South Korea) Seoul; Singapore	24 October 1972; 15 December 1983
Syria	Australia 2–1 Syria; Australia 3–2 Syria; Syria 0–1 Australia	(Australia) Sydney (United Arab Emirates) Al Ain (Qatar) Doha	10 October 2017; 15 January 2019; 18 January 2024
Tajikistan	Australia 7–0 Tajikistan	(Australia) Adelaide	24 March 2016
Thailand	Thailand 0–4 Australia	Singapore (Thailand) Bangkok	10 October 1982; 16 July 2007
United Arab Emirates	Australia 2–0 United Arab Emirates	(Australia) Newcastle (Australia) Sydney	27 January 2015; 28 March 2017
Uzbekistan	Uzbekistan 0–6 Australia	(Qatar) Doha	25 January 2011
Vietnam^{1}	Australia 4–0 Vietnam	(Australia) Melbourne	27 January 2022

Notes:

^{1} includes South Vietnam

=== CAF ===
Team	Best result	Venue	Date
Cameroon	Australia 1–0 Cameroon	(Australia) Sydney	27 March 2026
Egypt	Egypt 0–0 Australia; Australia 1–1 Egypt	(South Korea) Seoul (United States) Arlington	19 June 1987; 3 July 2026
Ghana	Ghana 0–2 Australia	(South Africa) Durban	14 September 1996
Kenya	Kenya 0–4 Australia	(South Africa) Pretoria	21 September 1996
Morocco	Morocco 0–1 Australia	(South Korea) Kangnung	9 June 1987
Nigeria	Nigeria 0–1 Australia; Australia 1–0 Nigeria	(South Korea) Seoul (England) London	22 September 1988; 17 November 2007
South Africa	Australia 5–1 South Africa	(Australia) Newcastle	7 June 1947
Tunisia	Tunisia 0–3 Australia	(Tunisia) Tunis	1 October 1997
Zimbabwe^{1}	Southern Rhodesia 0–5 Australia	(Southern Rhodesia) Salisbury	14 June 1950

Notes:

^{1} includes Southern Rhodesia and Rhodesia

=== CONCACAF ===
Team	Best result	Venue	Date
Canada	Australia 4–1 Canada; Australia 3–0 Canada	(Australia) Sydney (England) London	23 June 1924; 16 October 2013
Costa Rica	Australia 1–0 Costa Rica	(Australia) Sydney	19 November 2013
Curaçao	Australia 5–1 Curaçao	(Australia) Melbourne	31 March 2026
Honduras	Australia 3–1 Honduras	(Australia) Sydney	15 November 2017
Jamaica	Australia 5–0 Jamaica	(England) London	9 October 2005
Mexico	Australia 3–1 Mexico; Australia 2–0 Mexico	(Saudi Arabia) Riyadh (South Korea) Suwon	12 December 1997; 30 May 2001
United States	United States 0–1 Australia	(United States) Orlando	13 June 1992

=== CONMEBOL ===
Team	Best result	Venue	Date
Argentina	Australia 4–1 Argentina	(Australia) Sydney	14 July 1988
Brazil	Australia 1–0 Brazil	(South Korea) Ulsan	11 June 2001
Chile	Chile 0–0 Australia; Chile 1–1 Australia	(West Germany) Berlin (Russia) Moscow	22 June 1974; 25 June 2017
Colombia	Australia 0–0 Colombia; Colombia 0–0 Australia	(Australia) Brisbane (England) London	8 February 1995; 27 March 2018
Ecuador	Australia 3–1 Ecuador	(Australia) Sydney	24 March 2023
Paraguay	Australia 2–1 Paraguay; Australia 1–0 Paraguay	(Australia) Melbourne (Australia) Sydney	15 June 2000; 9 October 2010
Peru	Australia 0–0 Peru	(Qatar) Al Rayyan	13 June 2022
Uruguay	Australia 2–0 Uruguay	(Australia) Sydney	27 April 1974
Venezuela	Venezuela 1–1 Australia	(Venezuela) Caracas	18 February 2004

=== OFC ===
Team	Best result	Venue	Date
American Samoa	Australia 31–0 American Samoa	(Australia) Coffs Harbour	11 April 2001
Cook Islands	Australia 17–0 Cook Islands	(French Polynesia) Papeete	19 June 2000
Fiji	Australia 10–0 Fiji	(Australia) Melbourne	14 August 1981
New Caledonia	Australia 11–0 New Caledonia	(New Zealand) Auckland	8 July 2002
New Zealand	New Zealand 0–10 Australia	(New Zealand) Wellington	11 July 1936
Papua New Guinea	Australia 11–2 Papua New Guinea	(New Caledonia) Nouméa	26 February 1980
Samoa	Australia 11–0 Samoa	(Australia) Coffs Harbour	16 April 2001
Solomon Islands	Australia 13–0 Solomon Islands	(Australia) Sydney	11 June 1997
Tahiti	Australia 9–0 Tahiti	(Australia) Adelaide	31 May 2004
Tonga	Australia 22–0 Tonga	(Australia) Coffs Harbour	9 April 2001
Vanuatu	Australia 3–0 Vanuatu	(Australia) Adelaide	4 June 2004

=== UEFA ===
Team	Best result	Venue	Date
Belgium	Belgium 2–0 Australia	(Belgium) Liège	4 September 2014
Bulgaria	Australia 2–2 Bulgaria; Australia 1–1 Bulgaria	(Australia) Sydney (Chile) Valparaíso	14 February 1973; 15 February 2000
Croatia	Australia 3–1 Croatia	(Australia) Adelaide	8 July 1992
Czech Republic^{1}	Australia 4–0 Czech Republic	(Austria) Sankt Pölten	1 June 2018
Denmark	Australia 1–0 Denmark	(South Africa) Roodepoort (Qatar) Al Wakrah	1 June 2010; 30 November 2022
East Germany	East Germany 2–0 Australia	(West Germany) Hamburg	14 June 1974
England	England 1–3 Australia	(England) London	12 February 2003
France	Australia 1–0 France	(South Korea) Daegu	1 June 2001
Germany^{2}	Germany 1–2 Australia	(Germany) Mönchengladbach	29 March 2011
Greece	Greece 1–3 Australia	(Greece) Athens	17 November 1970
Hungary	Hungary 0–3 Australia	(Hungary) Budapest	23 February 2000
Ireland	Ireland 0–3 Australia	(Republic of Ireland) Limerick	12 August 2009
Israel	Australia 2–0 Israel	(Australia) Melbourne	6 March 1988
Italy	Italy 1–0 Australia	(Germany) Kaiserslautern	26 June 2006
Liechtenstein	Liechtenstein 1–3 Australia	(Germany) Ulm	7 June 2006
North Macedonia ^{3}	Macedonia 0–1 Australia	(North Macedonia) Skopje	12 March 1997
Netherlands	Netherlands 1–2 Australia	(Netherlands) Eindhoven	6 September 2008
Northern Ireland	Australia 1–1 Northern Ireland	(Australia) Melbourne	15 June 1980
Norway	Australia 1–0 Norway	(Australia) Sydney	25 January 1997
Poland	Poland 1–2 Australia	(Poland) Kraków	7 September 2010
Romania	Romania 3–2 Australia	(Spain) Málaga	6 February 2013
Russia^{4}	Australia 0–0 Soviet Union; Australia 0–0 Soviet Union; Australia 1–1 Soviet Union	(Australia) Perth (Australia) Brisbane (Australia) Newcastle	16 November 1975; 26 November 1975; 3 December 1975
Scotland	Scotland 0–2 Australia	(Scotland) Glasgow	15 November 2000
Serbia^{5}	Australia 1–0 Yugoslavia; Australia 2–1 Serbia	(South Korea) Kwangju (South Africa) Nelspruit	18 September 1988; 23 June 2010
Slovakia	Australia 0–0 Slovakia	(Chile) Valparaíso	12 February 2000
Slovenia	Slovenia 2–0 Australia	(Slovenia) Ljubljana	11 August 2010
Spain	Australia 0–3 Spain	(Brazil) Curitiba	23 June 2014
Sweden	Australia 1–0 Sweden	(Australia) Adelaide (Australia) Melbourne	29 January 1992; 2 February 1992
Switzerland	Switzerland 0–0 Australia; Switzerland 1–1 Australia	(Switzerland) St. Gallen (United States) San Diego	3 September 2010; 6 June 2026
Turkey	Australia 2–0 Turkey	(Canada) Vancouver	13 June 2026
Wales	Wales 1–2 Australia	(Wales) Cardiff	10 August 2011

Notes:

^{1} includes Czechoslovakia
^{2} includes West Germany
^{3} includes Macedonia
^{4} includes Soviet Union
^{5} includes Yugoslavia

== Penalty shoot-out record ==
Team	Match score (PSO score)	Status	Venue
Egypt	0–0 (4–3)	Presidents Cup	(South Korea) Olympic Stadium, 19 June 1987
South Korea	1–1 (4–5)	Presidents Cup	(South Korea) Olympic Stadium, 21 June 1987
South Korea	0–0 (3–4)	Presidents Cup	(South Korea) Dongdaemun Stadium, 14 June 1991
Canada	2–1 (4–1)	1994 FIFA World Cup qualification	(Australia) Sydney Football Stadium, 15 August 1993
Uruguay	1–0 (4–2)	2006 FIFA World Cup qualification	Stadium Australia, 16 November 2005
Japan	1–1 (3–4)	2007 AFC Asian Cup	(Vietnam) Mỹ Đình National Stadium, 21 July 2007
Uzbekistan	0–0 (4–2)	2019 AFC Asian Cup	(United Arab Emirates) Khalifa bin Zayed Stadium, 21 January 2019
Peru	0–0 (5–4)	2022 FIFA World Cup qualification	(Qatar) Ahmad bin Ali Stadium, 13 June 2022
Egypt	1–1 (2–4)	2026 FIFA World Cup	(United States) AT&T Stadium, 3 July 2026

== Best / Worst ==
=== Best Results ===
Rank	Score	Opponent	Date
1	31-0	American Samoa	11 April 2001
2	22-0	Tonga	9 April 2001
3	17-0	Cook Islands	19 June 2000
4	16-0	Cook Islands	28 September 1998
5	13-0	Solomon Islands	11 June 1997
6	11-0	Samoa	16 April 2001
6	11-0	New Caledonia	8 July 2002
8	10-0	New Zealand	11 July 1936
8	10-0	Fiji	14 August 1981
10	11-2	Papua New Guinea	26 February 1980
10	9-0	Tahiti	31 May 2004
10	9-0	Guam	7 December 2012

=== Worst Results ===
Rank	Score	Opponent	Date
1	8-0	South Africa	17 September 1955
2	7-0	Croatia	6 June 1998
3	6-0	South Africa	24 September 1955
3	7-1	India	12 December 1956
3	6-0	Brazil	21 December 1997
3	6-0	Brazil	7 September 2013
3	6-0	France	11 October 2013
8	6-1	North Korea	21 November 1965
8	5-0	Czechoslovakia	3 February 1980
10	4-0	Czechoslovakia	27 January 1980
10	4-0	Germany	15 June 2005
10	4-0	Brazil	13 June 2017
