= Australia–Indonesia football rivalry =

Asian association football rivalry

- Locations of Australia (green) and Indonesia (orange) on the world map.
- Location: Asia and Oceania
- Teams: Australia; Indonesia
- First meeting: 17 November 1967; Friendly; Indonesia 0–2 Australia
- Latest meeting: 20 March 2025; FIFA World Cup qualification Australia 5–1 Indonesia

Statistics
- Total meetings: 16
- Most wins: Australia (16)
- All-time series: Australia: 16; Draws: 4 Indonesia: 1
- Largest victory: Australia 6–0 Indonesia (24 March 1973)

The Australia–Indonesia football rivalry refers to the association football rivalry between the men's national football teams of Australia and Indonesia. The matchup represents a notable cross-confederation geopolitical fixture within the Asian Football Confederation (AFC) landscape. The rivalry between the two national teams is also marked by the sometimes tense relations between the two countries' governments and pride in their national identities.

== History ==
The footballing relationship between Australia and Indonesia dates back to the mid-20th century. The first official senior international encounter occurred in November 1967, when Australia defeated Indonesia 2–0 in an international friendly fixture held in Jakarta. For several decades, the two nations competed primarily within different geographic regions, with Australia operating under the Oceania Football Confederation (OFC) and Indonesia under the ASEAN Football Federation (AFF) subsystem of the Asian Football Confederation (AFC).

A defining historical moment for Indonesia occurred on 30 August 1981 during the 1982 FIFA World Cup qualifiers. Playing in Jakarta, Indonesia achieved a historic 1–0 victory over Australia courtesy of a lone goal from striker Risdianto, registering what remains their only senior international victory against Australia.

Following Australia's formal transition into the AFC in 2006, competitive encounters grew in significance. The rivalry intensified in the 2020s as both teams frequently met in high-stakes continental matches. In the 2023 AFC Asian Cup Round of 16, Australia recorded a resounding 4–0 victory over a developing Indonesian squad. Later, during the 2026 FIFA World Cup third-round qualifiers, the two nations faced each other home-and-away. Indonesia managed to hold Australia to a historic 0–0 draw at a packed Gelora Bung Karno Stadium in September 2024, showcasing their tactical evolution, before Australia reclaimed dominance with a 5–1 win in Sydney in March 2025.

== Statistics ==
As of 20 March 2025

Tournament	Matches	Wins		Draws	Goals	
Tournament	Matches	Australia	Indonesia	Draws	Australia	Indonesia
FIFA World Cup qualification	6	4	1	1	13	3
AFC Asian Cup	1	1	0	0	4	0
AFC Asian Cup qualification	2	1	0	1	1	0
Other tournaments/international friendly	12	10	0	2	24	5
Total	21	16	1	4	42	8

== Results ==
Australia win Draw Indonesia win

Competition	Date	Home team	Score	Away team	Venue	Location	Ref.
International friendly	17 November 1967	Indonesia	0–2	Australia	Senayan Main Stadium	Jakarta, Indonesia	11v11
International friendly	20 November 1967	Indonesia	1–3	Australia	Senayan Main Stadium	Jakarta, Indonesia	11v11
International friendly	7 October 1972	Indonesia	1–4	Australia	Senayan Main Stadium	Jakarta, Indonesia	11v11
1974 FIFA World Cup qualification	13 March 1973	Australia	2–1	Indonesia	Sydney Sports Ground	Sydney, Australia	11v11
1974 FIFA World Cup qualification	24 March 1973	Australia	6–0	Indonesia	Sydney Sports Ground	Sydney, Australia	11v11
International friendly	21 May 1974	Indonesia	1–2	Australia	Senayan Main Stadium	Jakarta, Indonesia	11v11
International friendly	20 October 1976	Indonesia	1–1	Australia	Senayan Main Stadium	Jakarta, Indonesia	11v11
International friendly	7 December 1980	Indonesia	1–1	Australia	Senayan Main Stadium	Jakarta, Indonesia	11v11
1982 FIFA World Cup qualification	20 May 1981	Australia	2–0	Indonesia	Olympic Park Stadium	Melbourne, Australia	11v11
1982 FIFA World Cup qualification	30 August 1981	Indonesia	1–0	Australia	Gelora 10 November Stadium	Surabaya, Indonesia	11v11
1982 Merlion Cup	11 October 1982	Indonesia	0–2	Australia	National Stadium	Kallang, Singapore	11v11
1984 Merlion Cup	14 October 1984	Australia	2–1	Indonesia	National Stadium	Kallang, Singapore	11v11
1988 Jakarta Anniversary Tournament	13 August 1988	Indonesia	0–1	Australia	Senayan Main Stadium	Jakarta, Indonesia	11v11
1990 Indonesia Independence Cup	25 August 1990	Indonesia	0–3	Australia	Senayan Main Stadium	Jakarta, Indonesia	11v11
1992 Indonesia Independence Cup	14 August 1992	Indonesia	0–3	Australia	Senayan Main Stadium	Jakarta, Indonesia	11v11
International friendly	29 March 2005	Australia	3–0	Indonesia	Subiaco Oval	Perth, Australia	11v11
2011 AFC Asian Cup qualification	28 January 2009	Indonesia	0–0	Australia	Gelora Bung Karno Stadium	Jakarta, Indonesia	11v11
2011 AFC Asian Cup qualification	3 March 2010	Australia	1–0	Indonesia	Suncorp Stadium	Brisbane, Australia	11v11
2023 AFC Asian Cup	28 January 2024	Australia	4–0	Indonesia	Jassim bin Hamad Stadium	Al Rayyan, Qatar	11v11
2026 FIFA World Cup qualification	10 September 2024	Indonesia	0–0	Australia	Gelora Bung Karno Stadium	Jakarta, Indonesia	11v11
2026 FIFA World Cup qualification	20 March 2025	Australia	5–1	Indonesia	Allianz Stadium	Sydney, Australia	11v11

== See also ==
- Australia–Indonesia relations
- Australia men's national soccer team all-time record
- Indonesia national football team records and statistics
