= Chambly =

Chambly may refer to:

== Places ==
- Chambly, Quebec, a city in Quebec, Canada
- Chambly (federal electoral district), a defunct federal electoral district in Quebec, Canada, replaced by Chambly-Borduas
- Chambly—Borduas, a defunct federal electoral district in Quebec, Canada
- Chambly (provincial electoral district), a provincial electoral district in Quebec
- Chambly, Oise, a commune in France
- Bassin-de-Chambly (English: Chambly Basin), a waterbody formed by an enlargement of the Richelieu River in Montérégie, Quebec, Canada

== Schools ==
- Chambly Academy, a former high school in Saint-Lambert, Quebec
- Chambly County High School, a former high school in Saint-Lambert, Quebec
